= Jan Hendrych =

Czech painter, sculptor and university educator (born 1936)

Professor Jan Hendrych
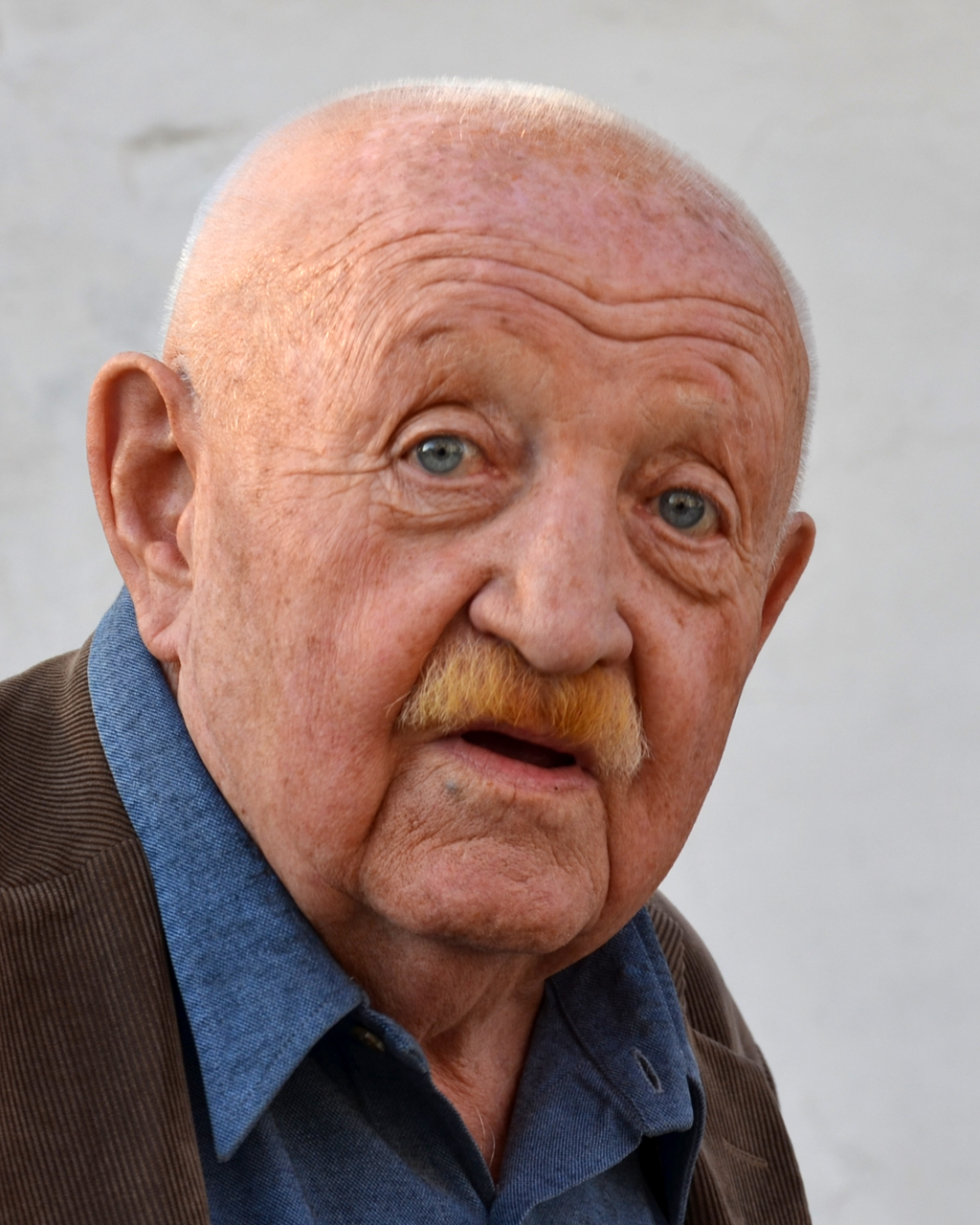
- Jan Hendrych (2016)
- Born: 28 November 1936 (age 89); Prague, Czechoslovakia
- Education: Academy of Fine Arts, Prague
- Known for: painter, sculptor, pedagogue
- Awards: Prize of the Ministry of Culture of the Italian Republic, Biennale Dantesca, Ravenna (1996)

Jan Hendrych (born 28 November 1936) is a Czech sculptor, painter, restorer, curator and professor emeritus at the Academy of Fine Arts in Prague.

== Life ==
Jan Hendrych was born in Prague-Střešovice in the family of the lawyer Jaroslav Hendrych (1908–1992) and the sculptor Olga Hendrychová, née Tobolková (1910-1986), a pupil of Prof. Otakar Španiel.

In 1951–1955 he graduated from the Secondary Industrial School of Interior Design (Prof. Václav Markup). He studied at the Academy of Arts and Crafts in Prague (1955–1961) in the sculpture studios of Prof. Josef Wagner and Prof. Jan Kavan and attended seminars in general aesthetics led by Dr. Dušan Šindelář. In 1963–1966 he was a postgraduate at the Academy of Fine Arts under Prof. Karel Hladík and Prof. Karel Lidický. Among his classmates and generational peers were several avant-garde artists who dealt with structural abstraction: Antonín Tomalík, Pavel Nešleha, Aleš Veselý, Zdeněk Beran, Antonín Málek, Jan Koblasa.

He first presented himself as a sculptor at the exhibition Socha 1964 Liberec and exhibited with members of the Index group at the Gallery of Modern Art in Roudnice (1966) and at the Vincenc Kramář Gallery (1968). He had his first solo exhibitions in 1966 at the Young Gallery in Mánes and in 1967 at the Summer Palace in Ostrov. Participated in nine FIDEM (International Art Medal Federation) shows.

After the Warsaw Pact invasion of Czechoslovakia in 1968 he lost the opportunity to exhibit and made a living restoring sculptures. The most significant from this period is his reconstruction of two sculptures of Theodor Friedl on the attic of the theatre in Karlovy Vary (with J. Laštovičková). It was not until 1988 that Jan Hendrych was able to exhibit his free work at the Prague City Gallery (Old Town Hall).

In 1990 he was appointed head of the Studio of Figurative Sculpture at the Academy of Fine Arts in Prague and a year later he was appointed professor there. At the same time he worked as an external professor at the Academy of Arts in Banská Bystrica and since 2000 as the head of the sculpture studio there.

In 1993 he became a member of the renewed Umělecká beseda, and in 1995 a member of the State Commission for Metallic Currency of the Czech National Bank. In 1993-95 he was the vice-rector of the Academy of Fine Arts in Prague. In 1997 and 1999 he led two semesters of figure modelling at the Academy of Fine Arts in Helsinki.

=== Awards ===
- 1990 First Prize, Sculpture Triennial, Sopot
- 1992 Gold and bronze medals, Biennale Dantesca, Ravenna
- 1996 MK Prize of the Italian Republic, Biennale Dantesca, Ravenna

=== Graduates of Hendrych's studio (selection) ===
- 1996 J. Švaříček RASVA, Marie Šeborová, Jaroslav Valečka, 1998 Jiří Fiala, 2007 Bohumil Eliáš jr., Barbora Maštrlová, Barbora Hapalová, 2008 Josefína Dušková, 2011 Kryštof Hošek

== Work ==
=== Sculptural work ===
Jan Hendrych devoted himself to portraiture during his studies in Wagner's studio, but was also influenced by the expressiveness and emotional involvement of the Czech Baroque. Through Prof. Kaplický, he became acquainted with the work of Marino Marini and learned from the expressive cubist modelling of Otto Gutfreund (Sitting in a Café, 1957) the plastic construction of Henry Moore's sculptures, and the possibility of smooth transitions between figuration and abstraction. Jan Hendrych is himself very musical and has been influenced by listening to Baroque music throughout his life. His sculptural work also gradually evolved towards a kind of Baroque mannerism.

He was an accomplished portraitist, but like many of his generational comrades, he too was affected by a wave of structural abstraction and experimentation with new materials (Figure with Raster, polyester, 1960). In the 1960s he produced a series of abstract stelae (The Pianist, 1964), figurative abstractions (Leaning Figure, 1965–66) and expressive busts combining plaster with plastic and polychrome (Sitting with Thought, 1969) or with industrial elements. With his own conception of abstraction, Jan Hendrych profiled himself as a distinctive individual with an authentic sculptural sensibility since the early 1960s.

In the late 1960s he returned to figuration with his distinctive response to the impulses of American Pop art and French New Realism with the sculptures The Reader and Sitting with Beer (1968). His works are also associated with the contemporary "new figuration", marked by the return of existentialism. Several busts of Secretaries (Secretary the Great, 1968–1969) are a reaction to the Warsaw Pact invasion of Czechoslovakia. In 1969 he participated in the Artchemo sculpture symposium of plastic materials in Pardubice (constructivist torso of combined materials Lying, 1969) and the historically significant New Figuration exhibitions in Prague and Brno. His reflection on the programme of New Sensibility and rational constructivism is one of the best examples of the liberating actuality of technical motifs in Czech art at that time.

==== Portraits and Heads ====
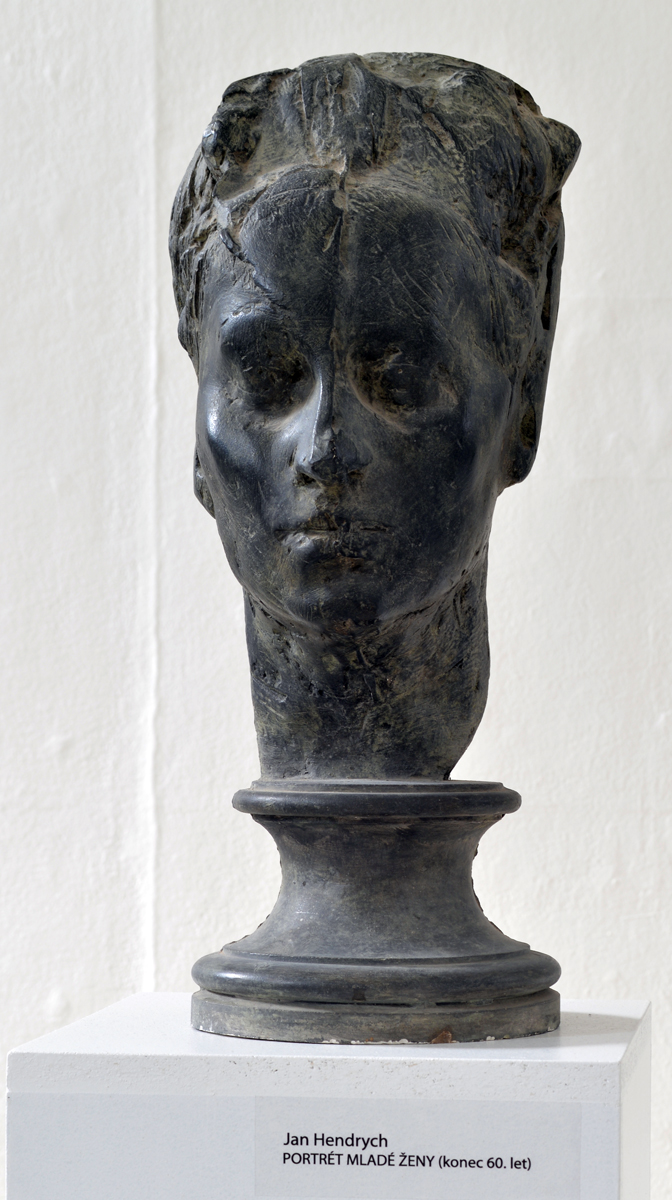
Portrait of a young woman (late 1960s)

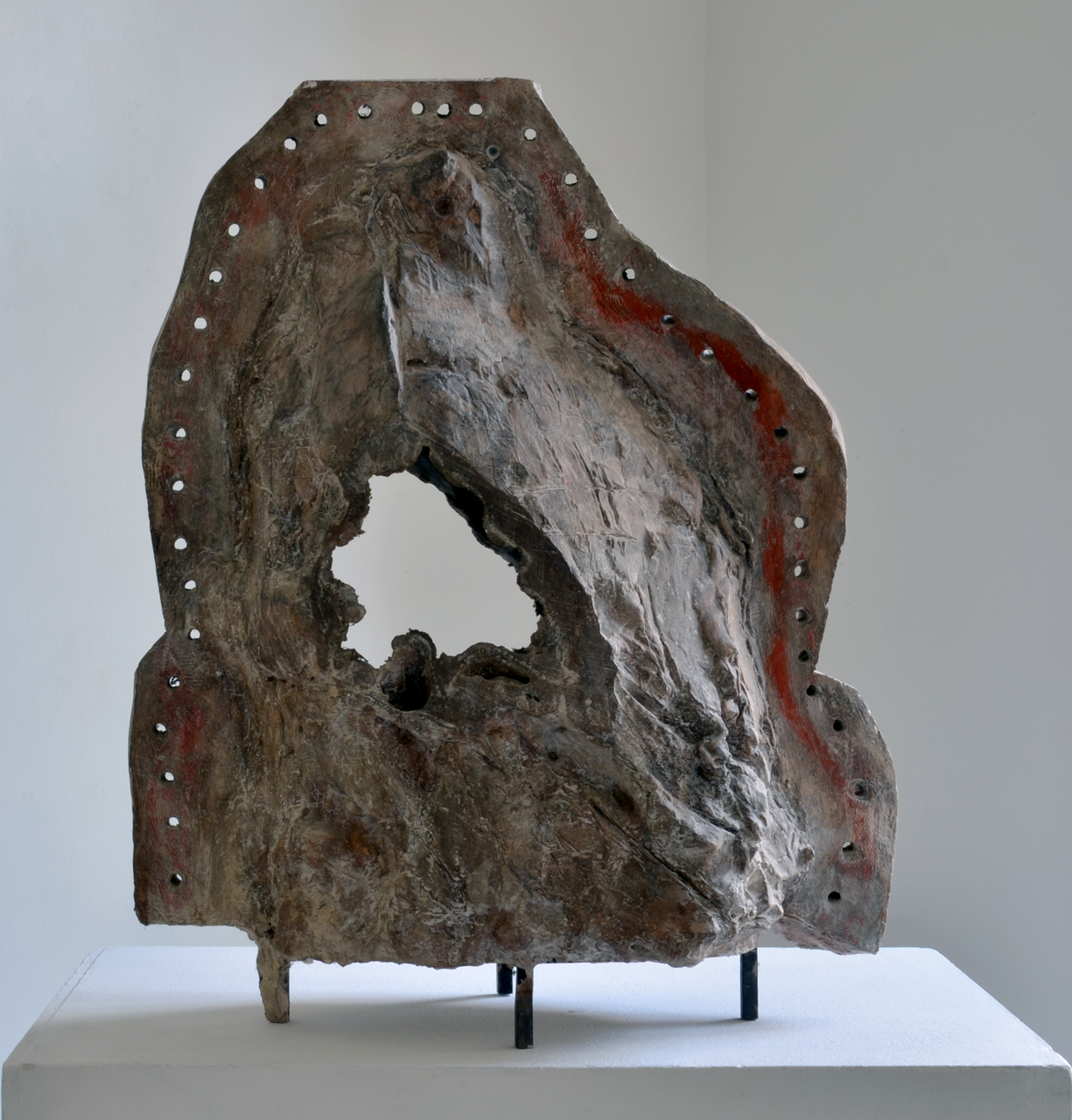
Grand Secretary (1968–1969)

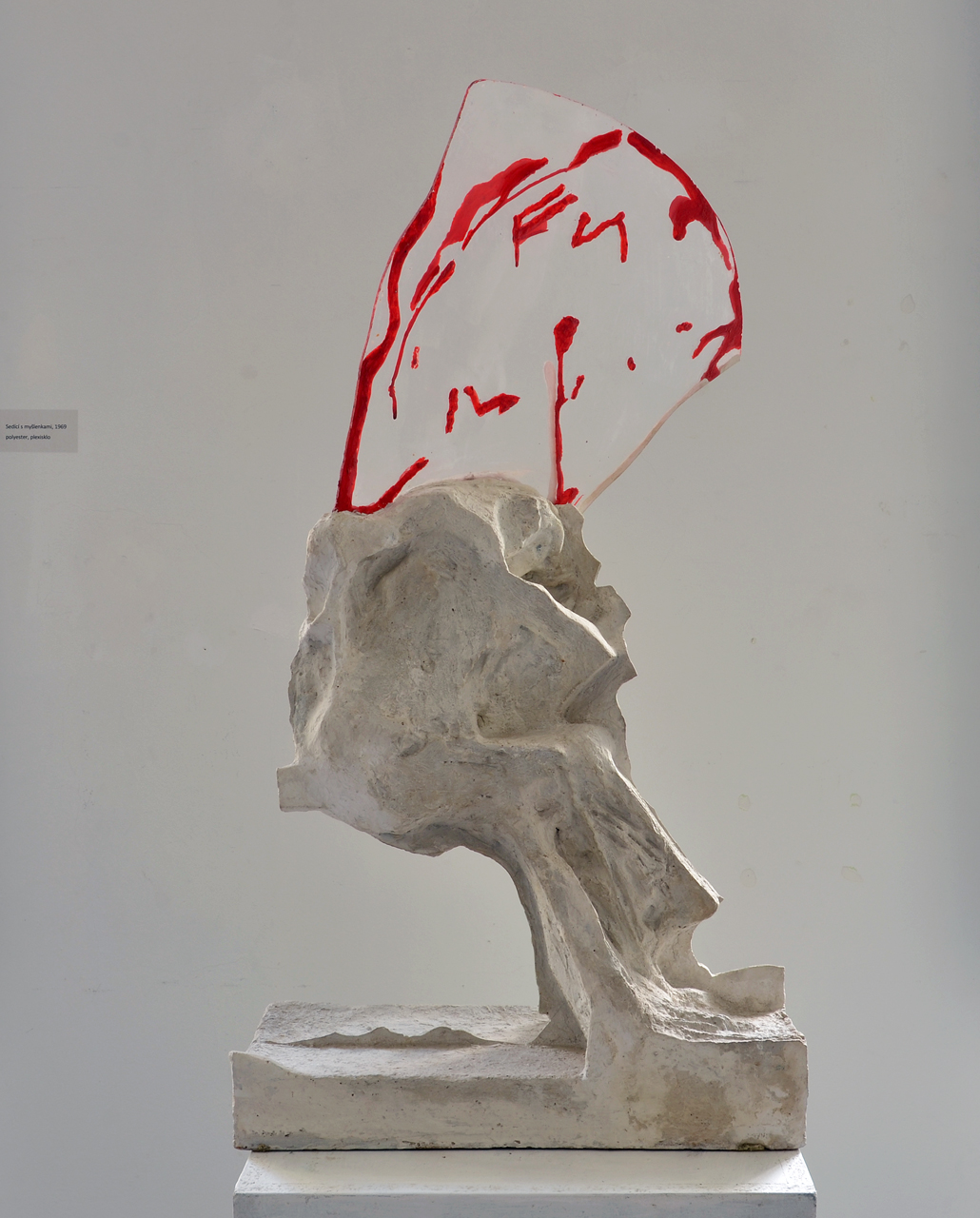
Sitting with Thoughts (1969)

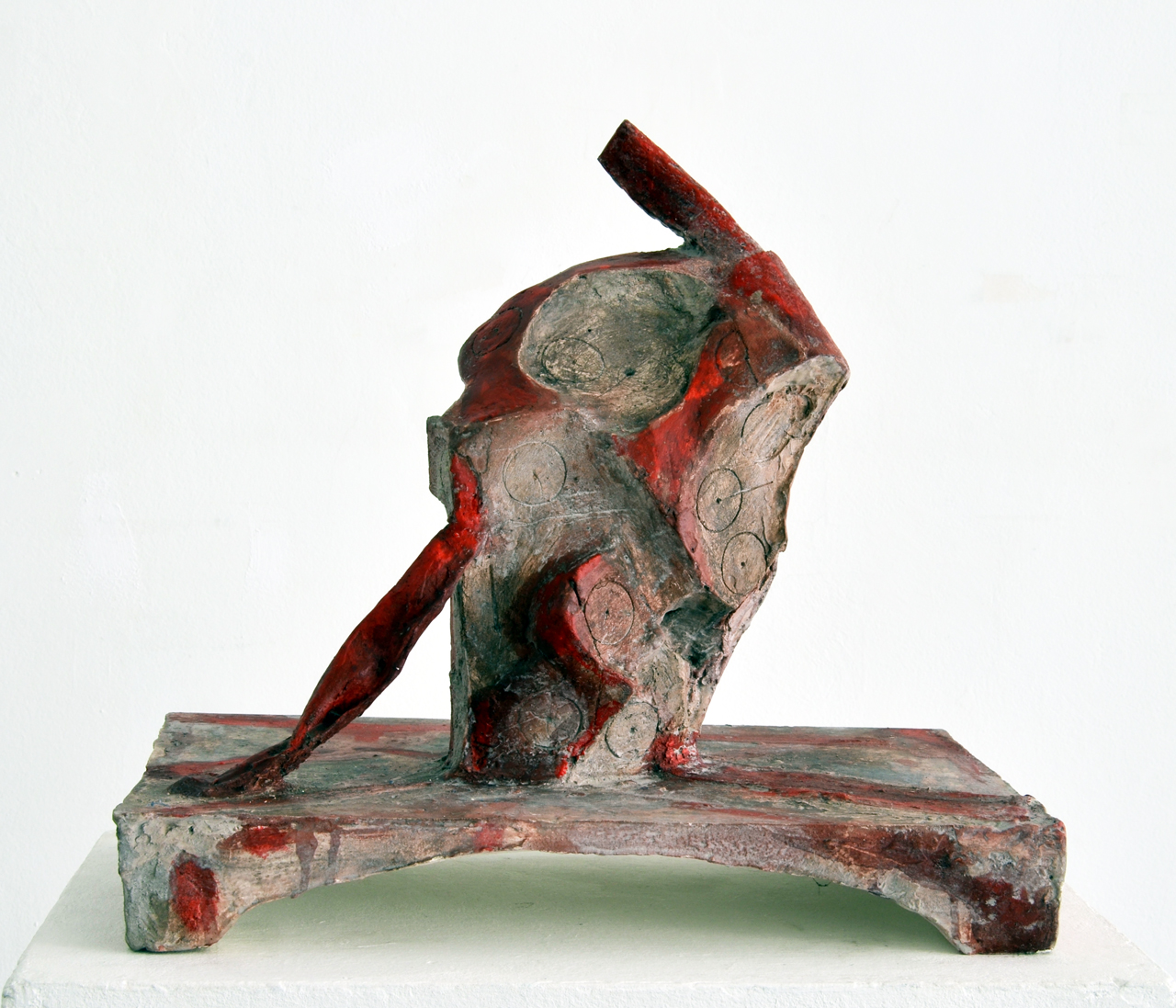
The Bridge – The Jester (1975)

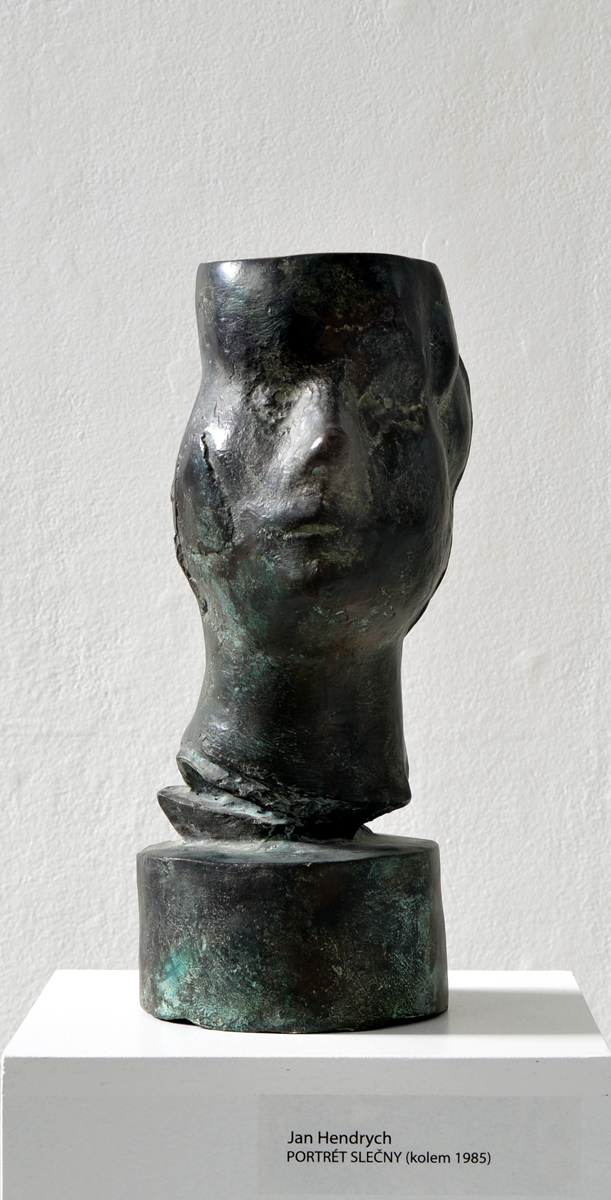
Portrait of a Miss (around 1985)

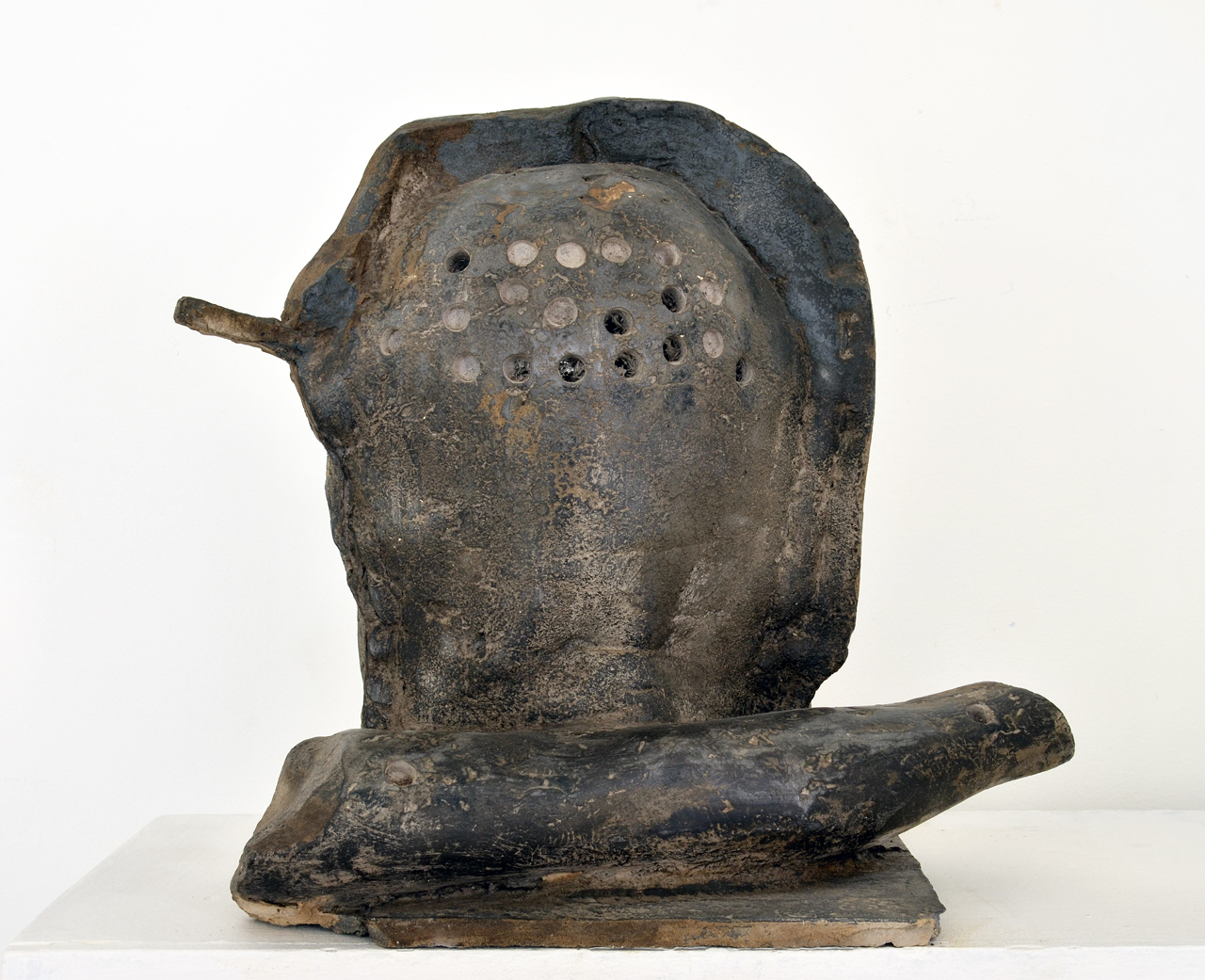
Head with Raster (2005)

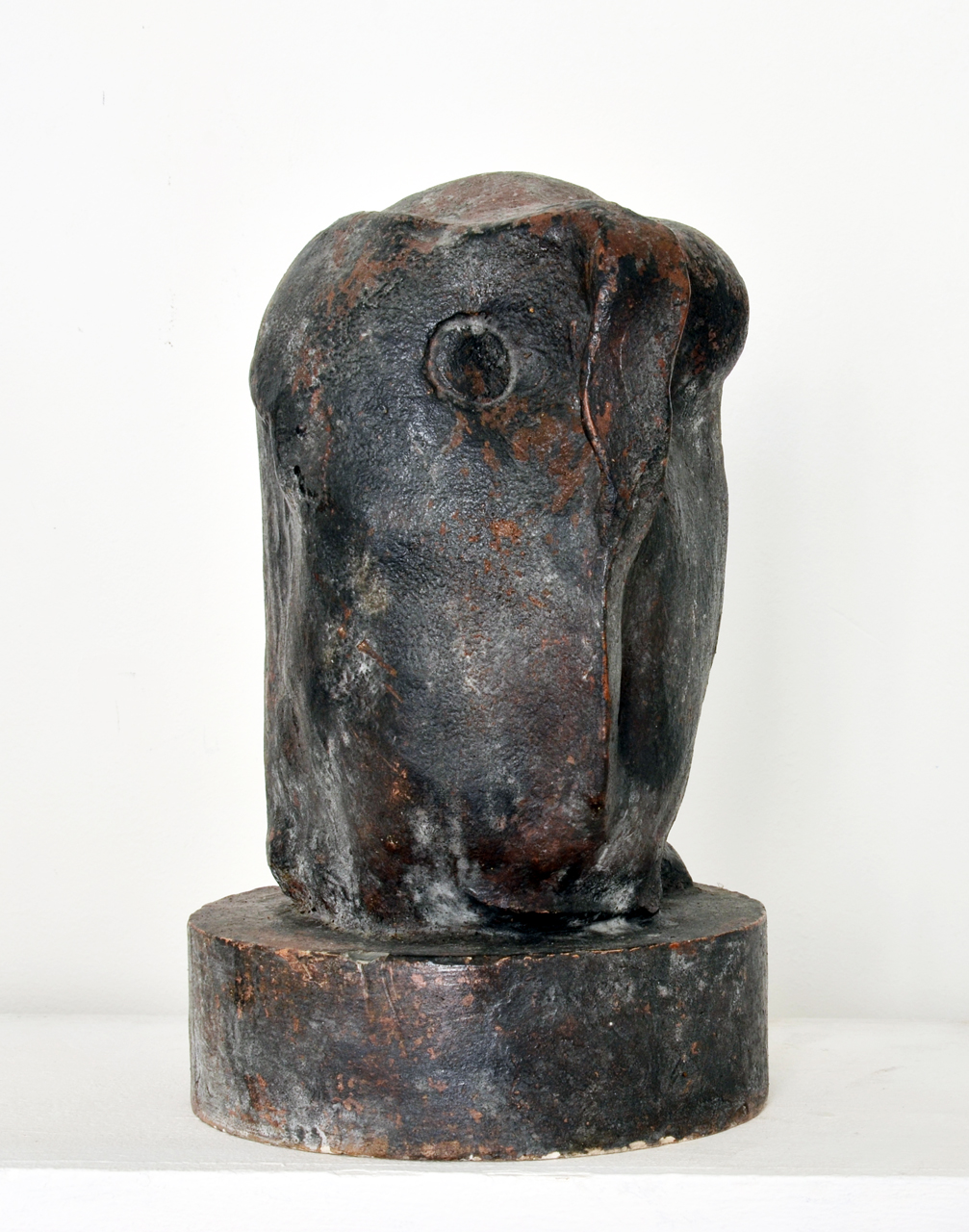
Head (2010)

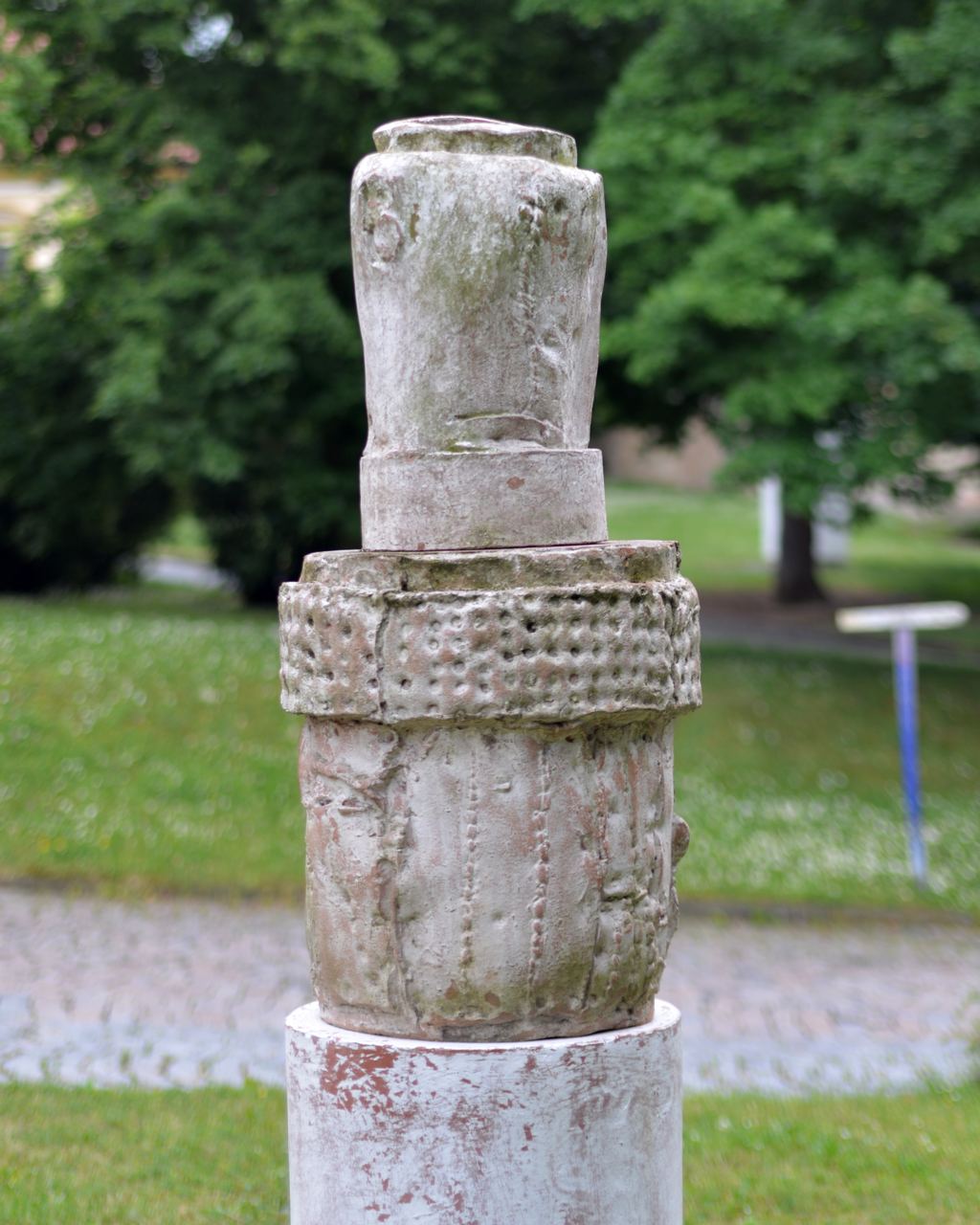
Head (2015)

During the Soviet occupation of Czechoslovakia he lost the opportunity to exhibit and from the 1970s worked as a restorer in South Bohemia. He was able to return to real creative work only after the fall of the communist regime in 1989. His encounters with historic bridges in small villages and the ubiquitous statues of John of Nepomuk were the inspiration for the following large-scale series of chamber sculptures of bridges with the figure, which continued until 2000. The bridges are an existential metaphor for a fateful journey, a risk, a turning point, or a record of a dramatic event in conjunction with a human story. A comprehensive set of these sculptures was exhibited in 1997 by the Ztichlá klika Gallery (South Bohemian Bridge with a Figure, bronze, 1976, Blacksmith's Bridge, tin, iron, 1986, St. John's Bridge, tin, 1991, South Bridge, cement, 1996, Chinese Bridge, bronze, polychrome, 2000). The bridges are also monuments to life's dramas and fatal tragedies, symbolizing the futility of every effort and glory.

Sculptures and relief plaques with the theme of gates have a similar symbolism (Theatrical Entrance, 1991, The Gate of Dantescus, bronze, 1994, Lot's Woman, plastic, 1994).

Several variants of carousels from the 1990s are a distinctive commentary on the social upheavals of the time, showing defeated, expressively modelled figures helplessly adrift on a rotating platform (The Great Carousel, 1994, Carousel, 1996–1997). From the same period comes the series of sculptures Wardrobe (1996–1999), which are conceived as existential situations and seem to still partly preserve the volume of the disappeared bodies that clothed them. Hendrych portrays them with an irony that is at the same time a pathetic celebration of critical consciousness.

Jan Hendrych is a baroquely dramatic and emotionally oriented sculptor and his works are part of a kind of theatre stage, telling a story in accordance with the baroque image of the world. His dominant theme since the 1980s has been the female nude. The figures are based on a tradition represented by the sculptures of Pomons by Marini or Maillol (Little Pomona, 1992). By sensitively modelling the monumental volume and balancing the proportions in relation to the base, the sculptor creates a female type to which he gives a completely contemporary expression but does not primarily seek to convey female beauty. In Study of a Girl from 1980, the torso has a modelled head with a calm, almost challenging facial expression. Girl with a Ball (1980–1990) is reminiscent of Bohumil Zemánek's figures in its grotesqueness. The suggestive effect of Hendrych's sculptures lies in the combination of the pathetic naturalism of some figures with lightening and grotesque details, as in the case of the sculpture Piercing (1998).

Hendrych is concerned with addressing the overall proportions and posture of the figure and consciously refrains from modelling parts he does not consider important - mostly the hands and face. He deliberately accentuates some of the practices associated with the expressive tendencies of New Figuration - for example, he leaves the figures with traces of the mould after casting (Torso with Bra, 1982) and gives the impression that the life-size sculpture has been assembled from individual parts (Study of the Nude without Hands, 2006–2007) or dresses it in loosely stitched pieces of clothing (Angel in Warm Underwear, 2007). Even more brutal is the marking of seams and perforations, which are related to the use of foam in the modelling. The naked figure evokes the chilling sense that the body has been sewn together after dissection or previous dismantling into parts (Late Afternoon, 2008). Resting Wrestler (2006–2007), created using a similar technique, is more reminiscent of a soldier training dummy.

When depicting a literary subject, Hendrych returns to abstraction and concentrates on relief modelling of the surface (Kafka's Stories I-IV, 1998). Contour sculptures intended for the frontal view are rather an exception in his work (Clown Heads, concrete, 1984–1992), as are sculptures composed of surface elements and an empty interior space (Bust with Three Ties, 1978–1999).

The figures in plaster are usually polychromed in neutral tones reminiscent of clay. Colour polychromy is used for non-figurative subjects (House in the Garden, 2003–2004) or to increase the expressive effect (Bridge of the Jester, 1975, Lady Goose, 2005).

==== Statues ====
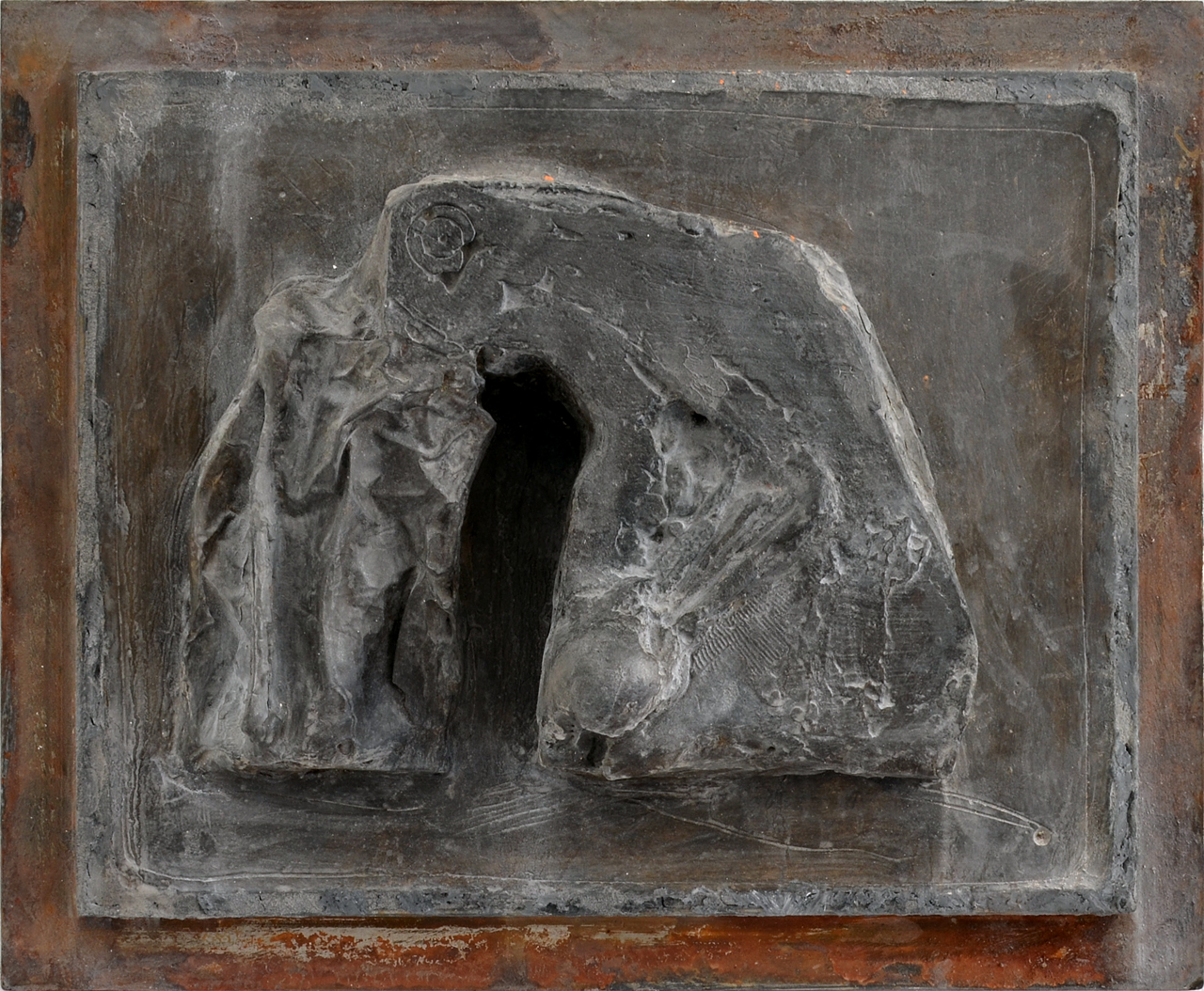
Kneeling, patinated plaster (1963)

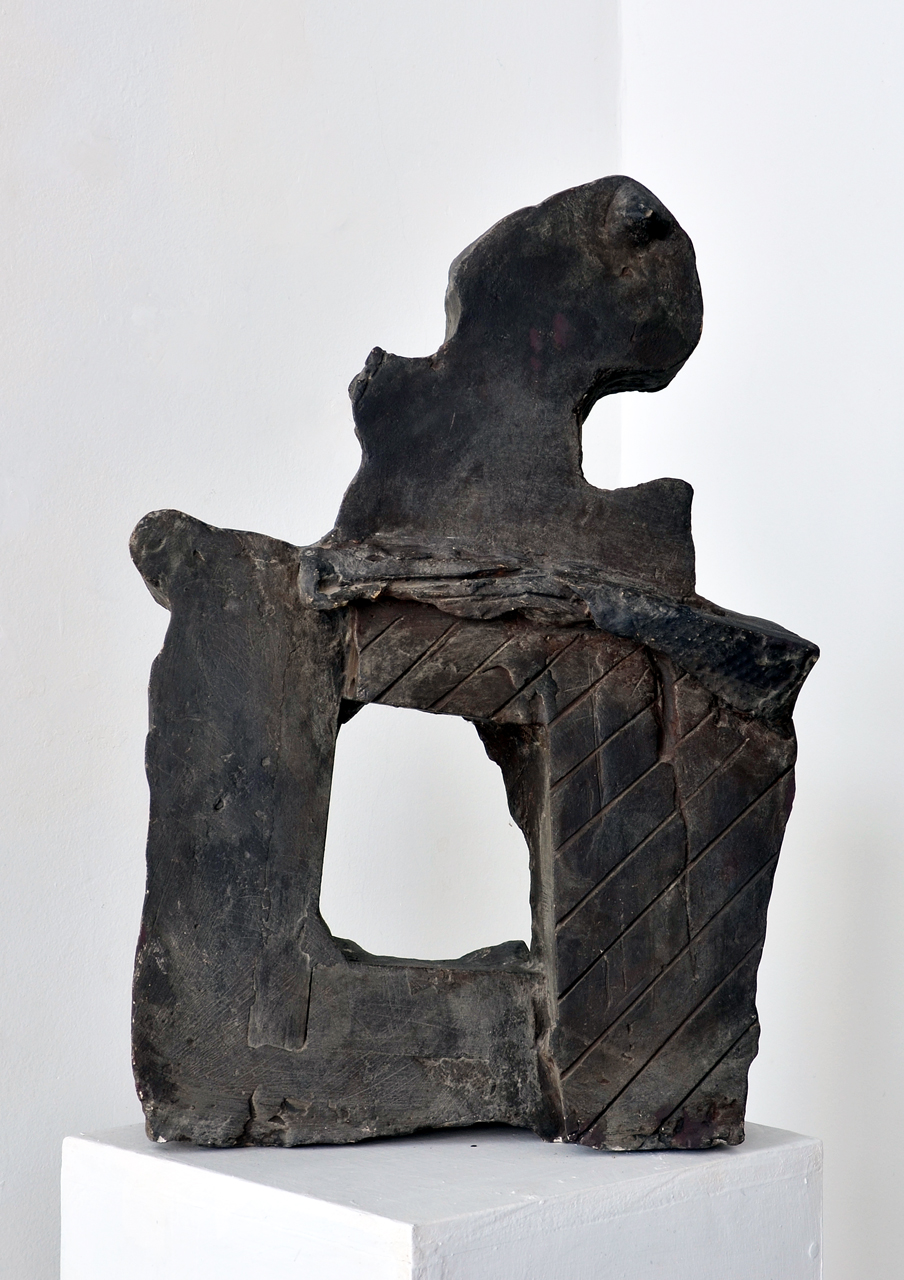
Sitting (1971), National Gallery in Prague

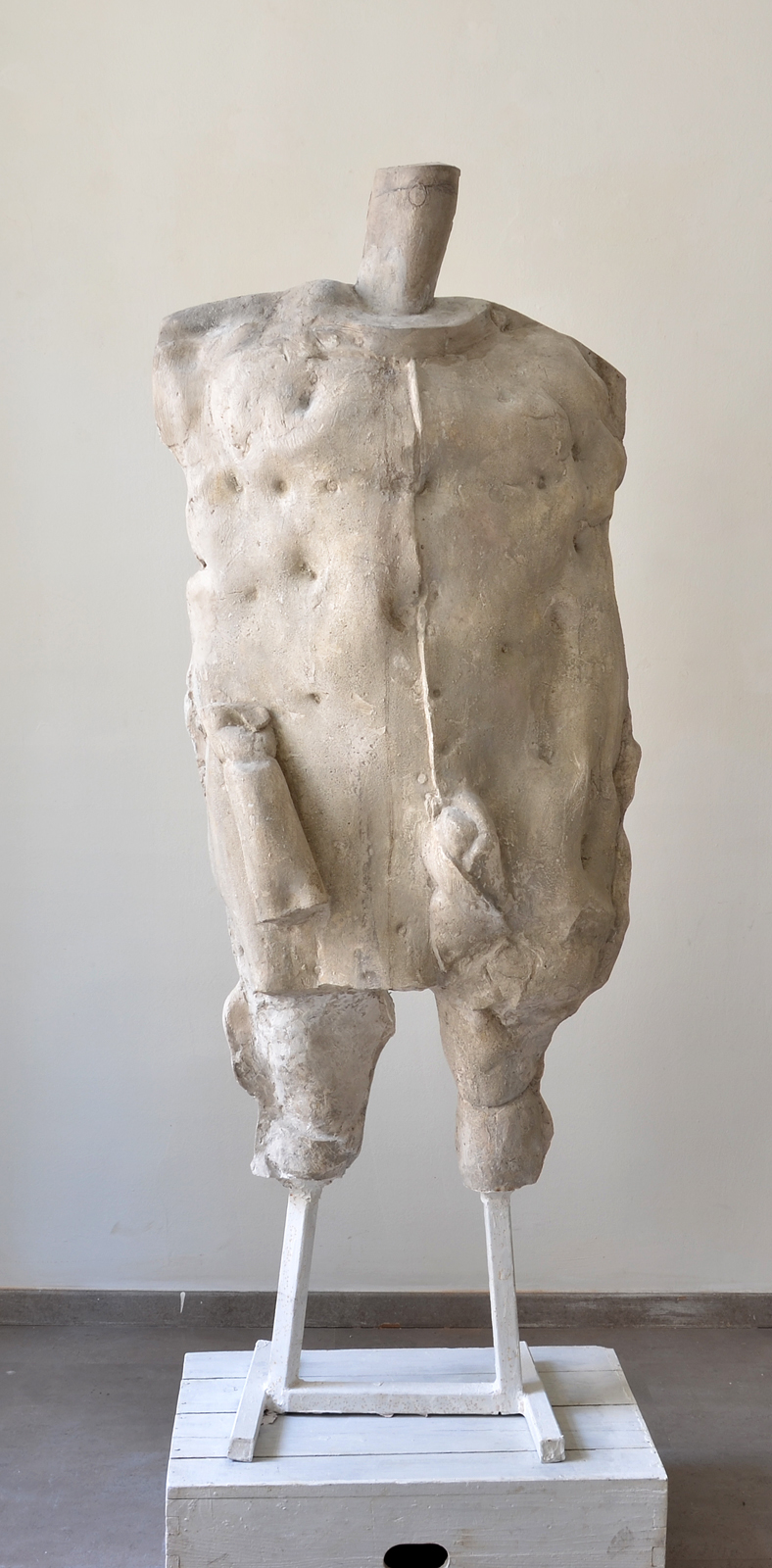
Bird Woman (1985)

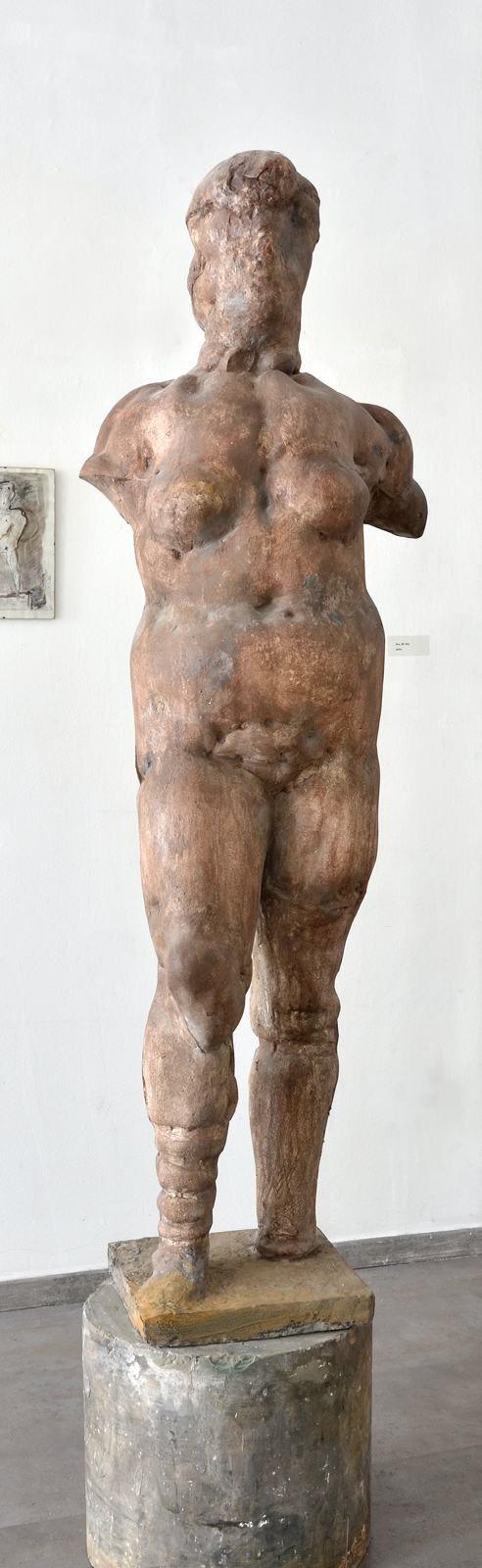
Night (1980s)

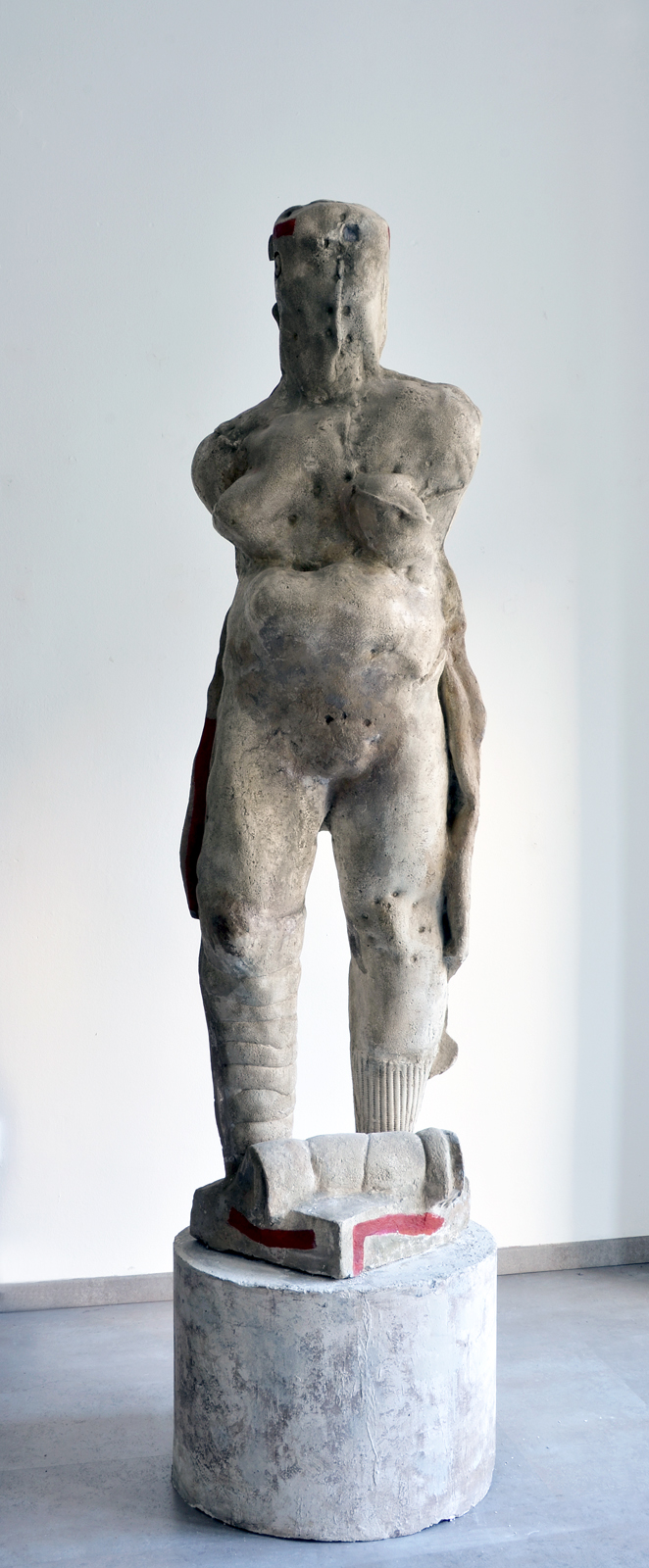
Mannerist Figure (2004)

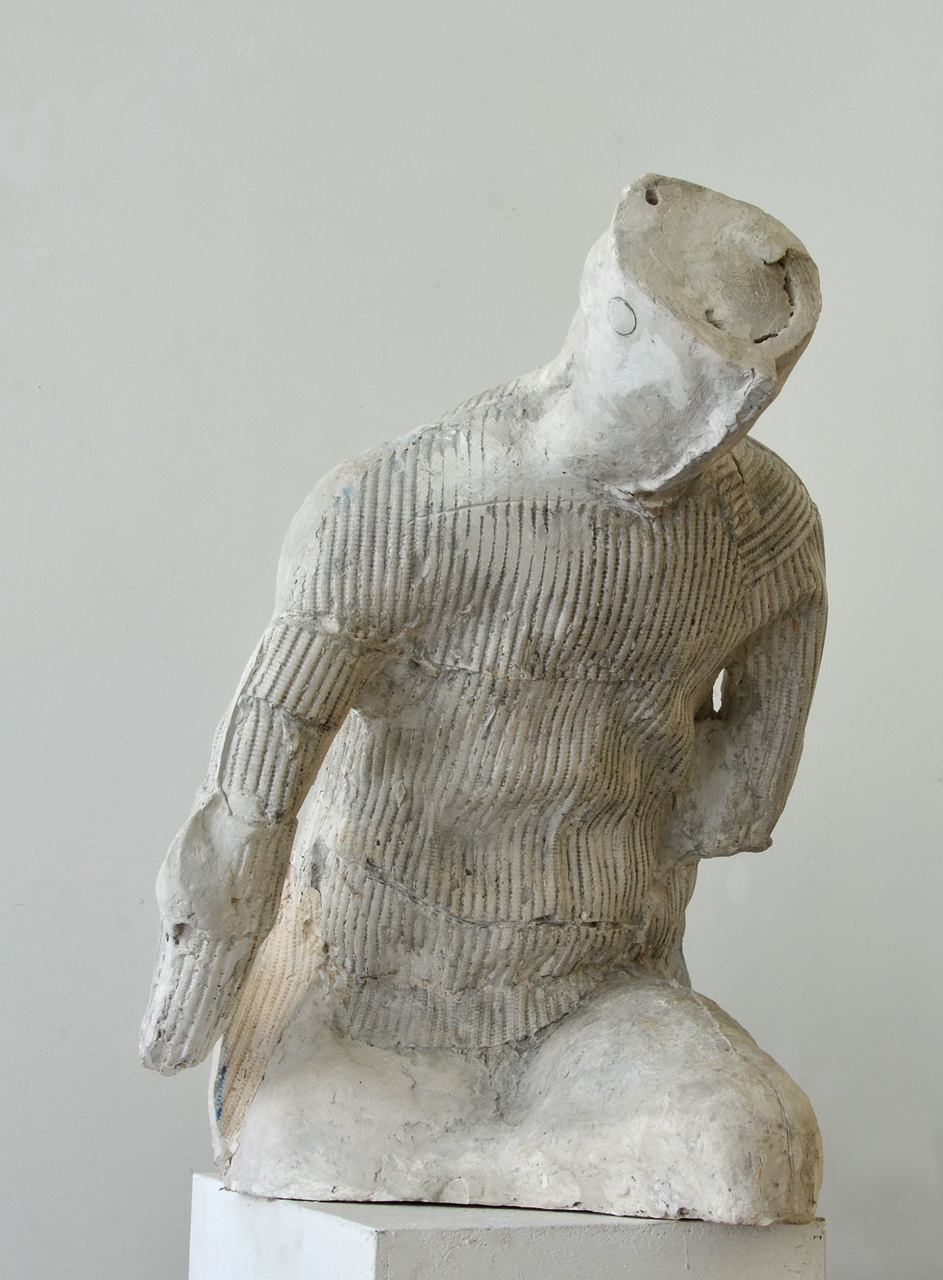
Atlant I (2005)

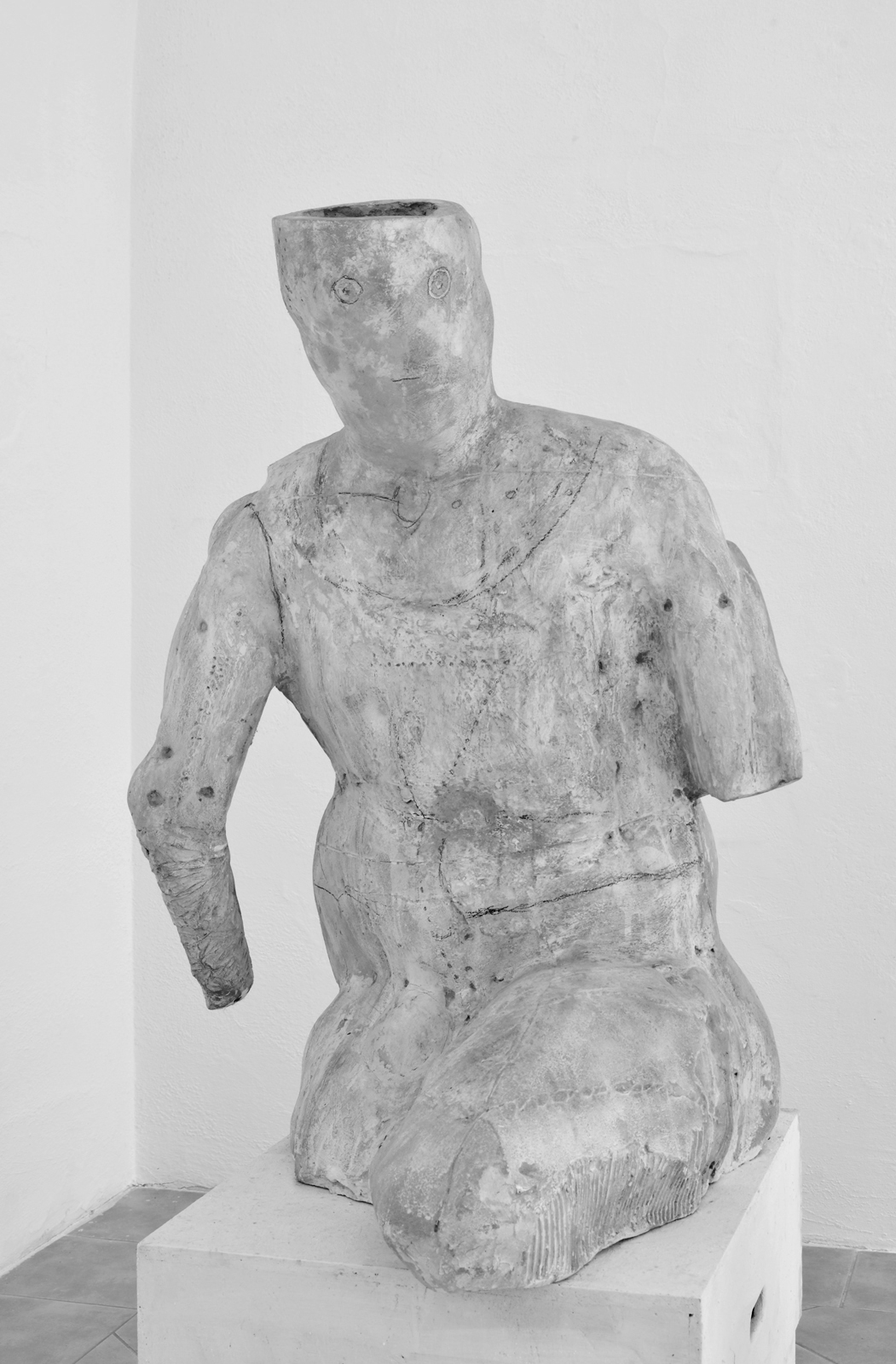
Atlant II (2005)

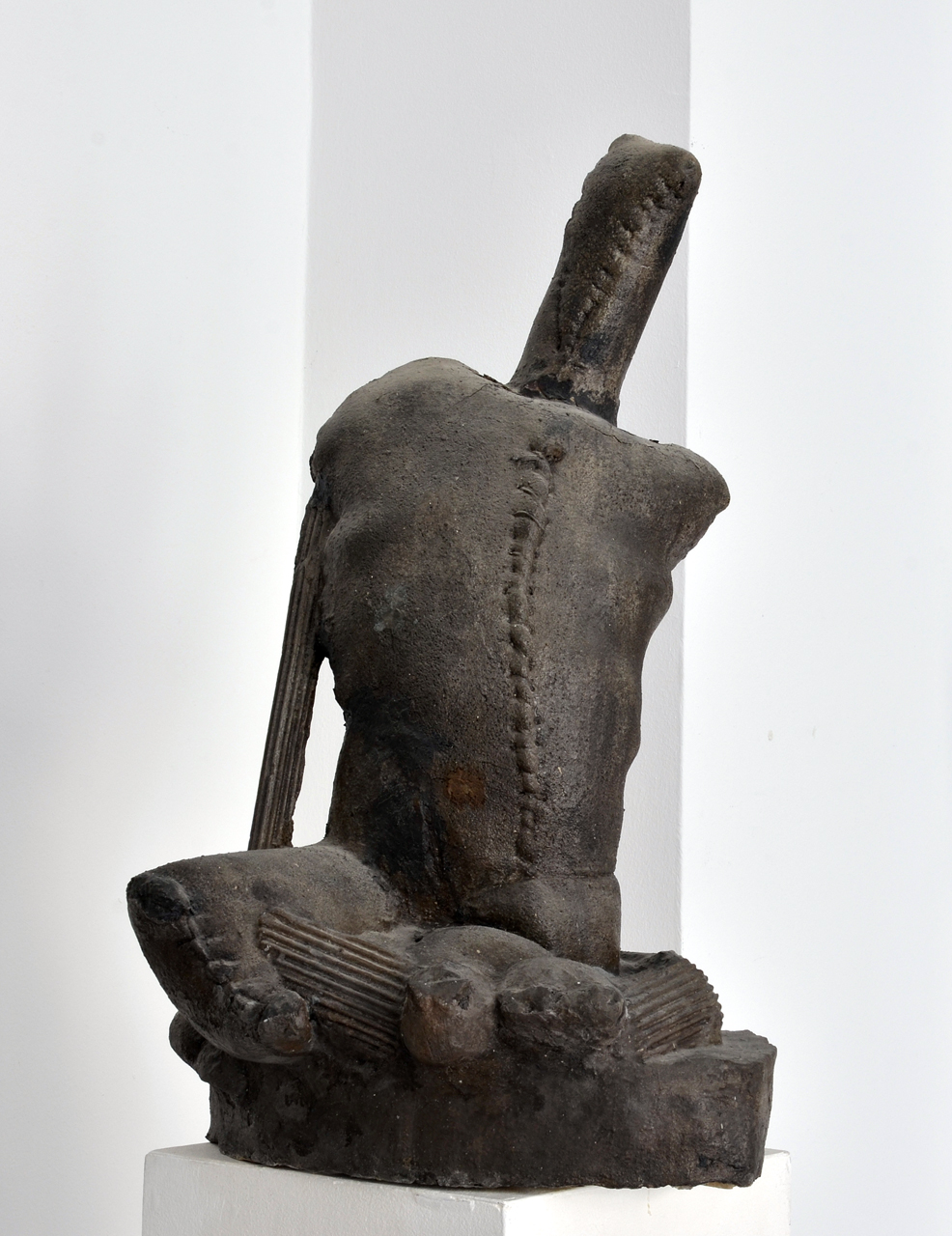
Resting Wrestler (2006–2007)

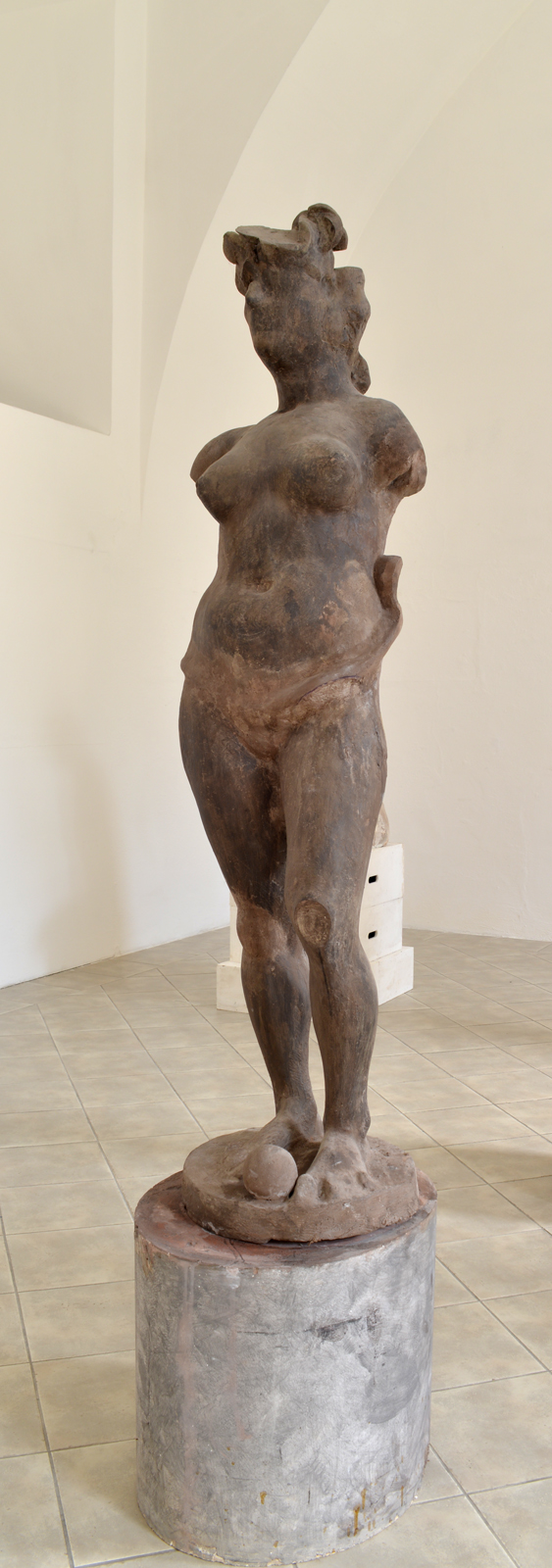
Reminiscences on a Baroque Figure (2007–2008)

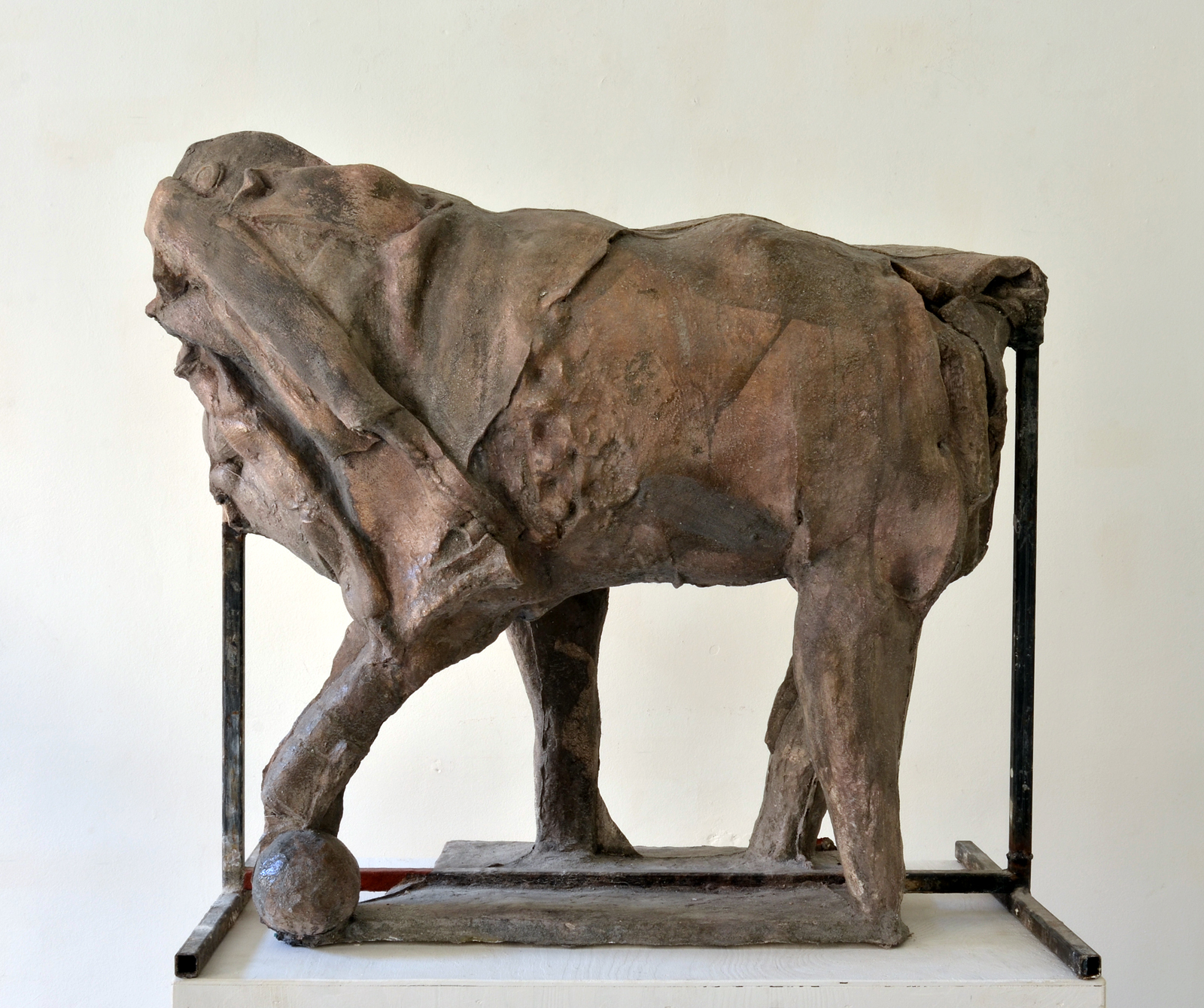
Kerberos (2015)

=== Drawings and prints ===
Jan Hendrych created an extensive set of preparatory drawings and graphic sheets (drypoint, etching) as studies for sculptures. The drawings are spontaneous, sovereign and experiment with matter and space in a limited two-dimensional format. Only a fraction of the recorded ideas can be realized in material. Many of the drawings are not directly related to his sculpture and form an integral part of his painting. (Sonata, gouache, 1986, The Dogman, 2000).

==== Drawings from the sketchbook (2014–2015) ====
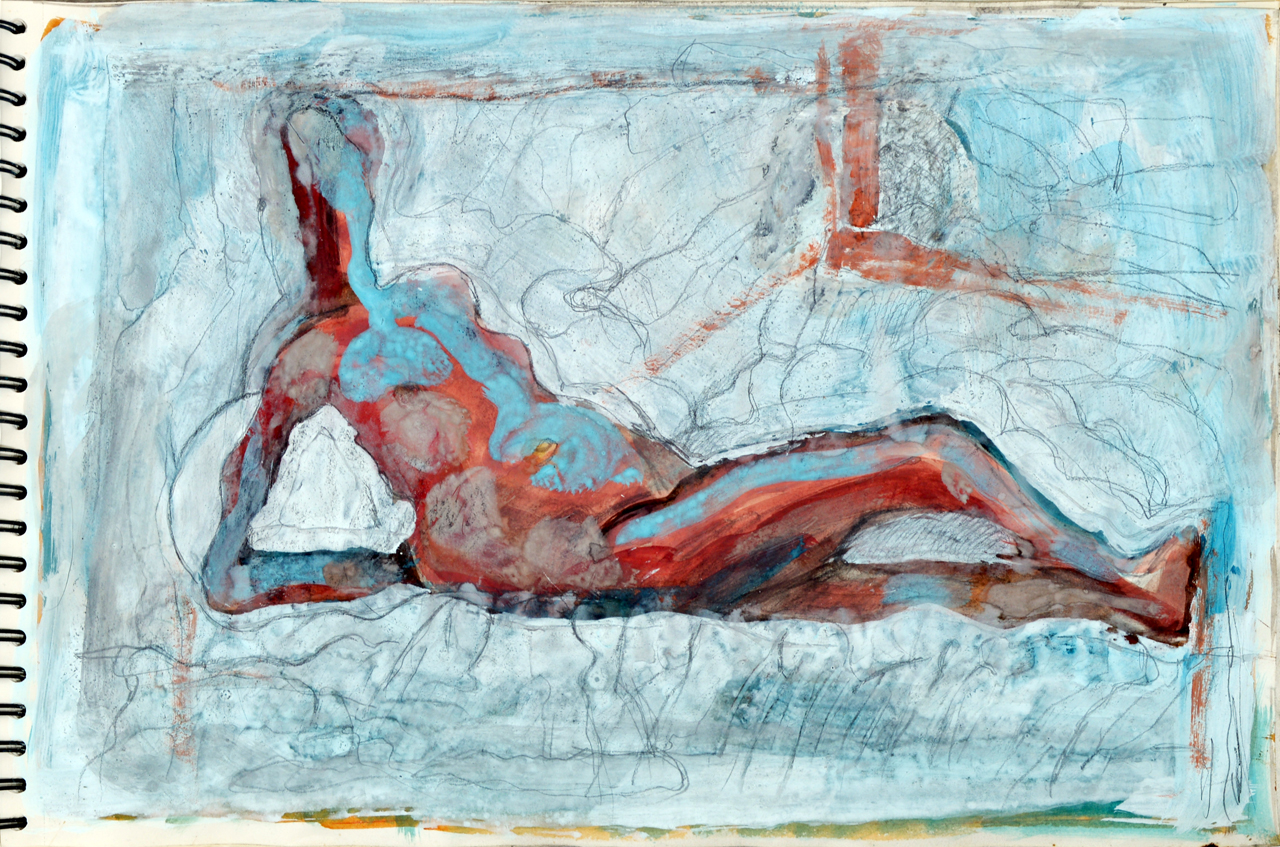
Reclining

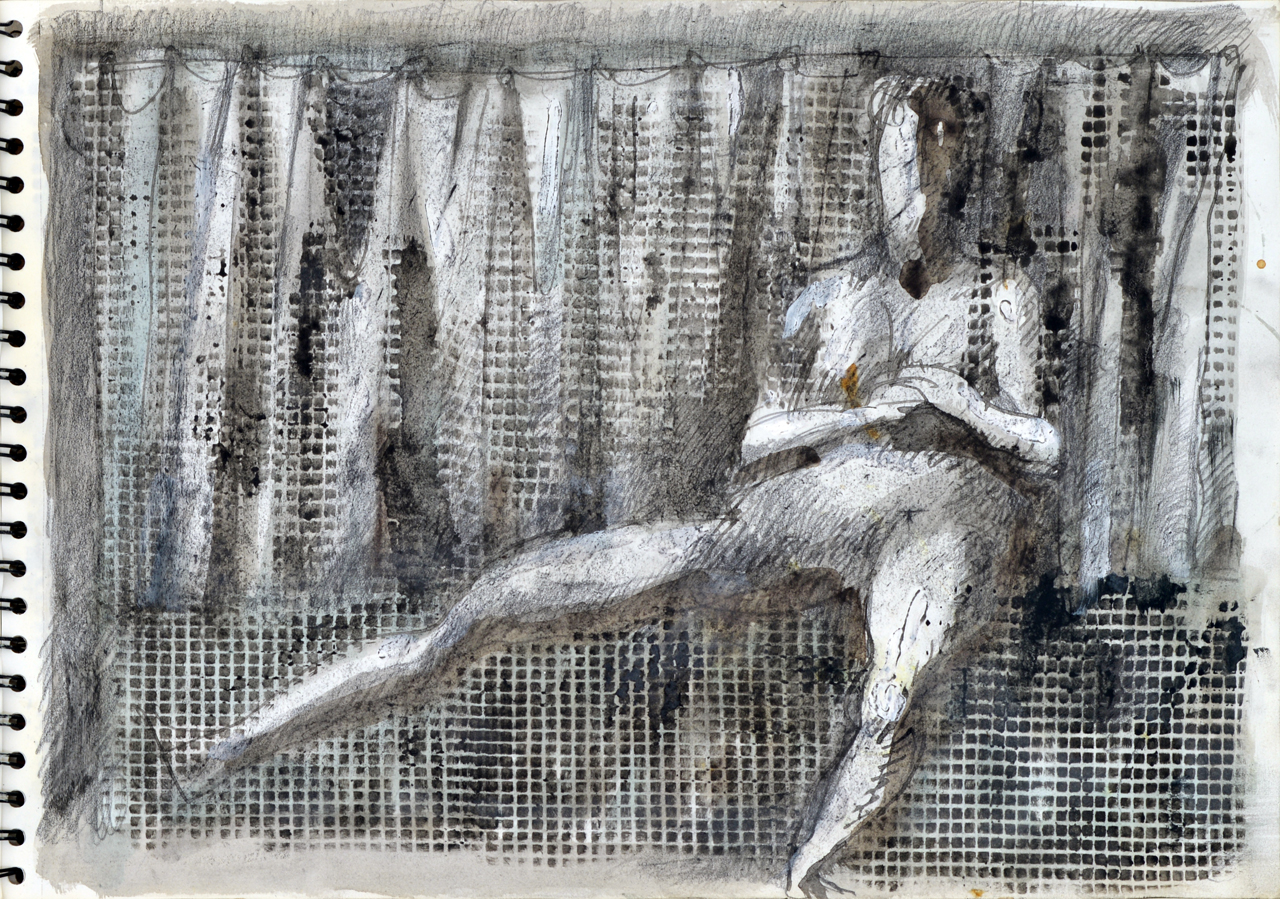
In the sauna

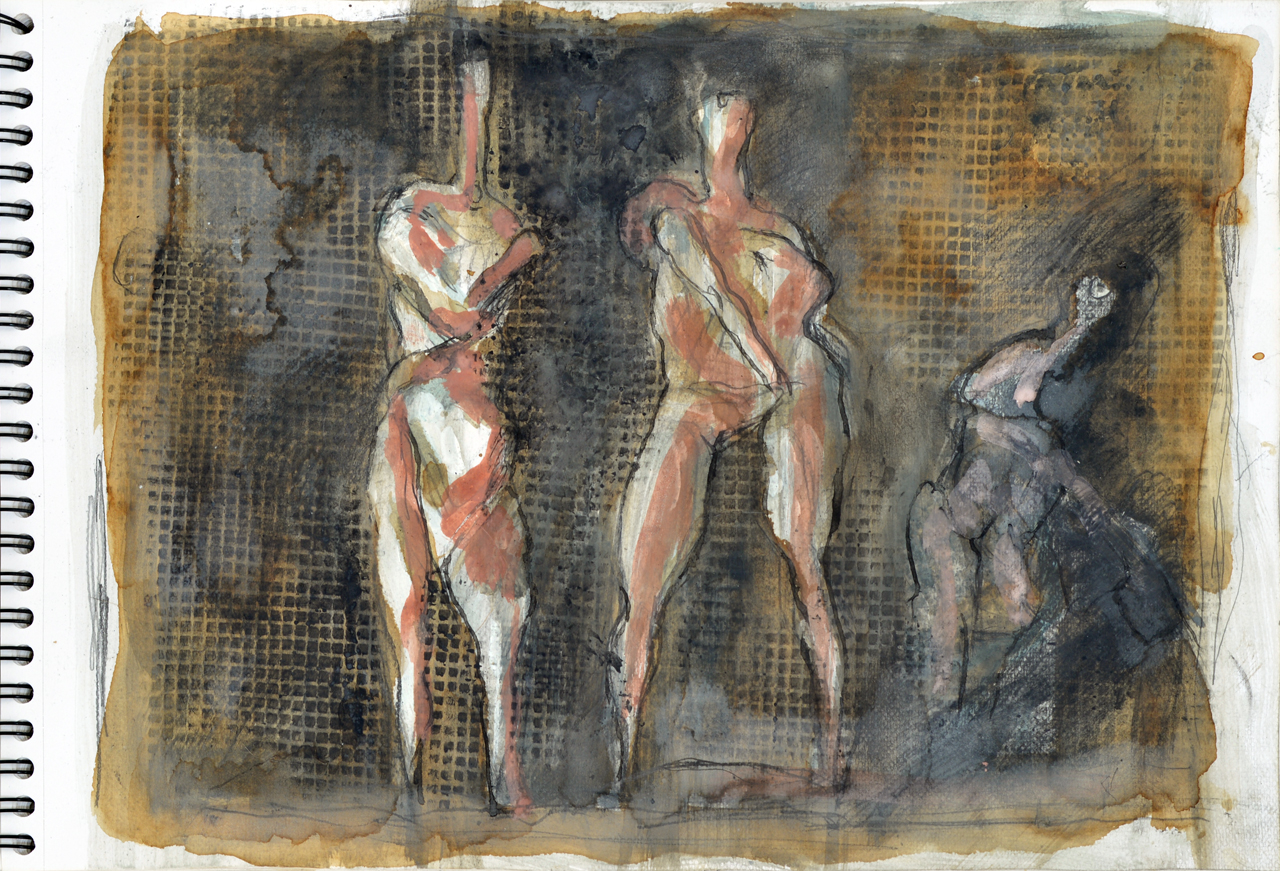
Theatre

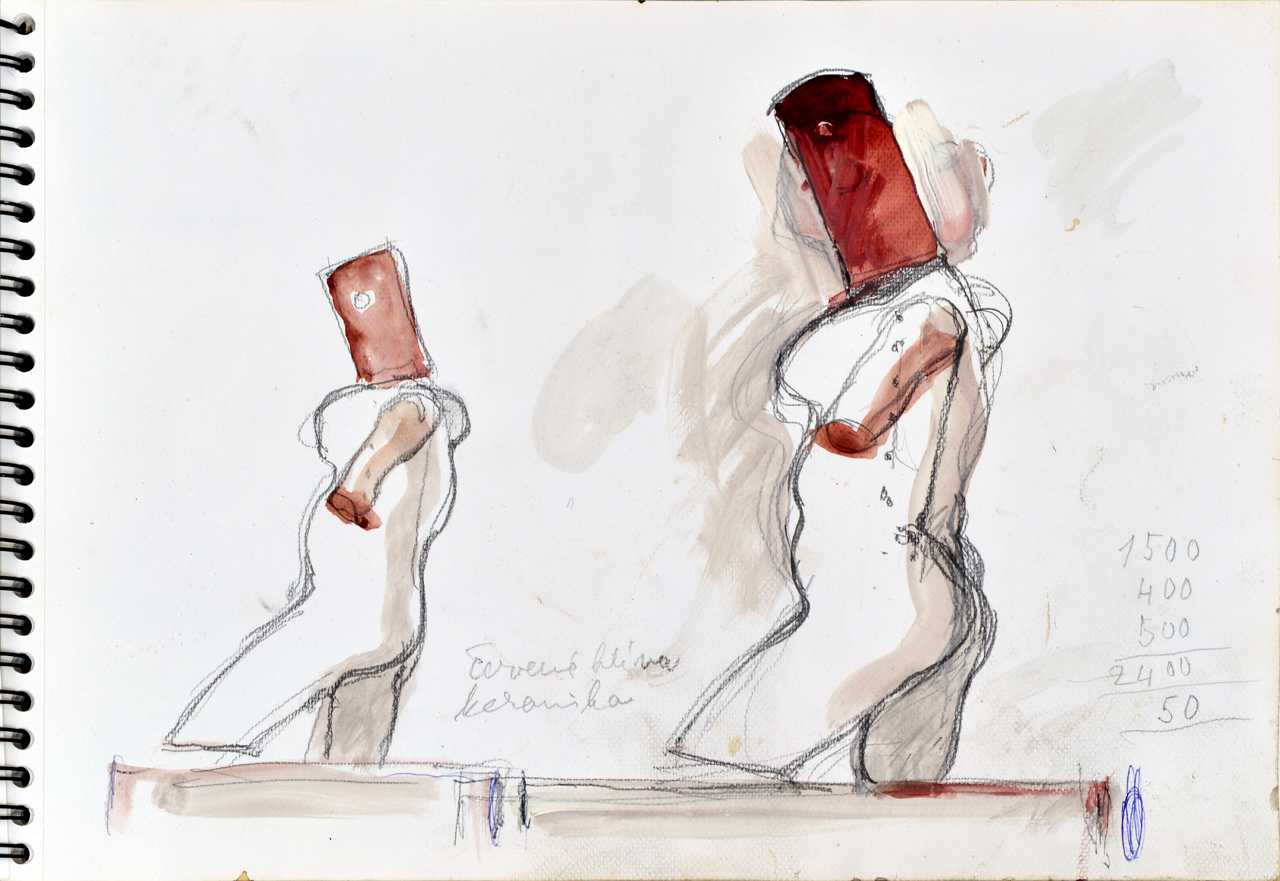
Sketch for sculptures

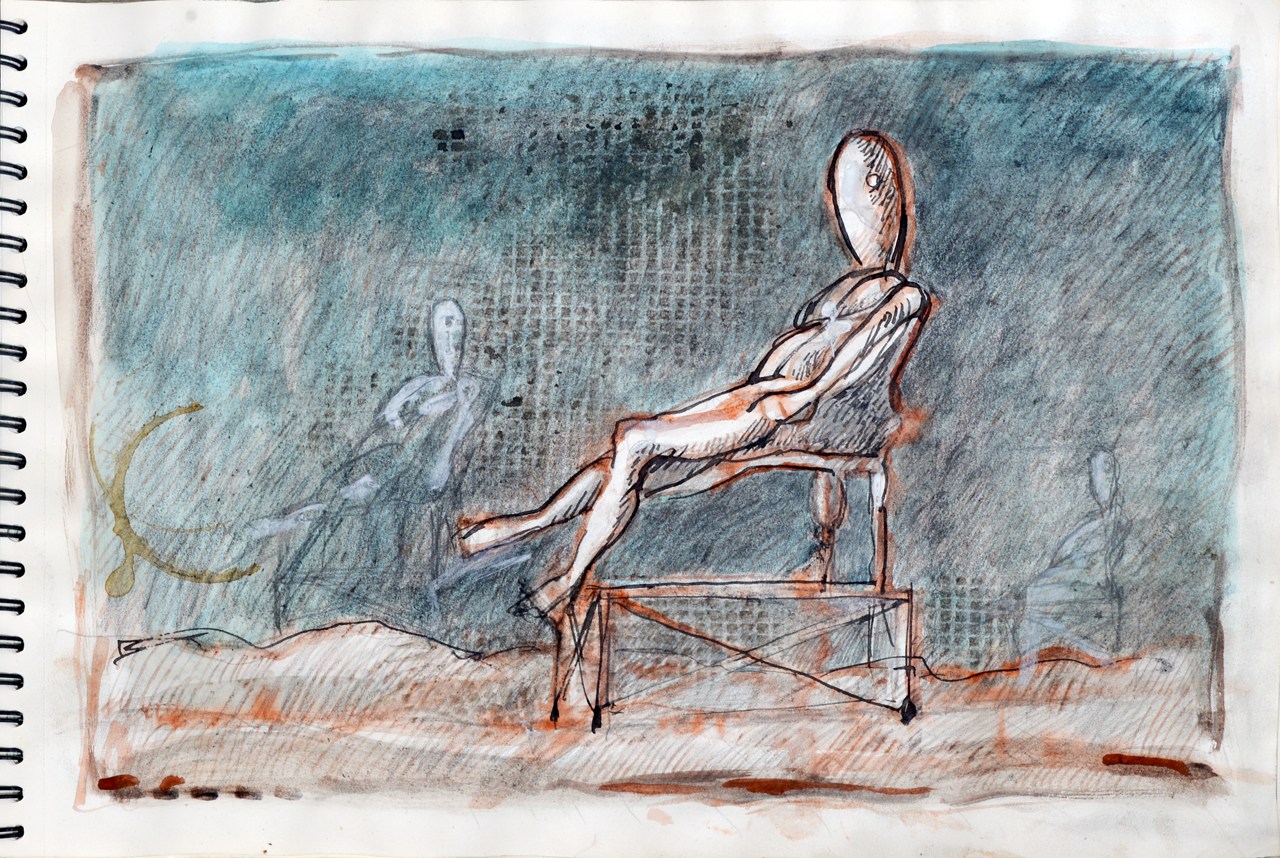
On the Moon

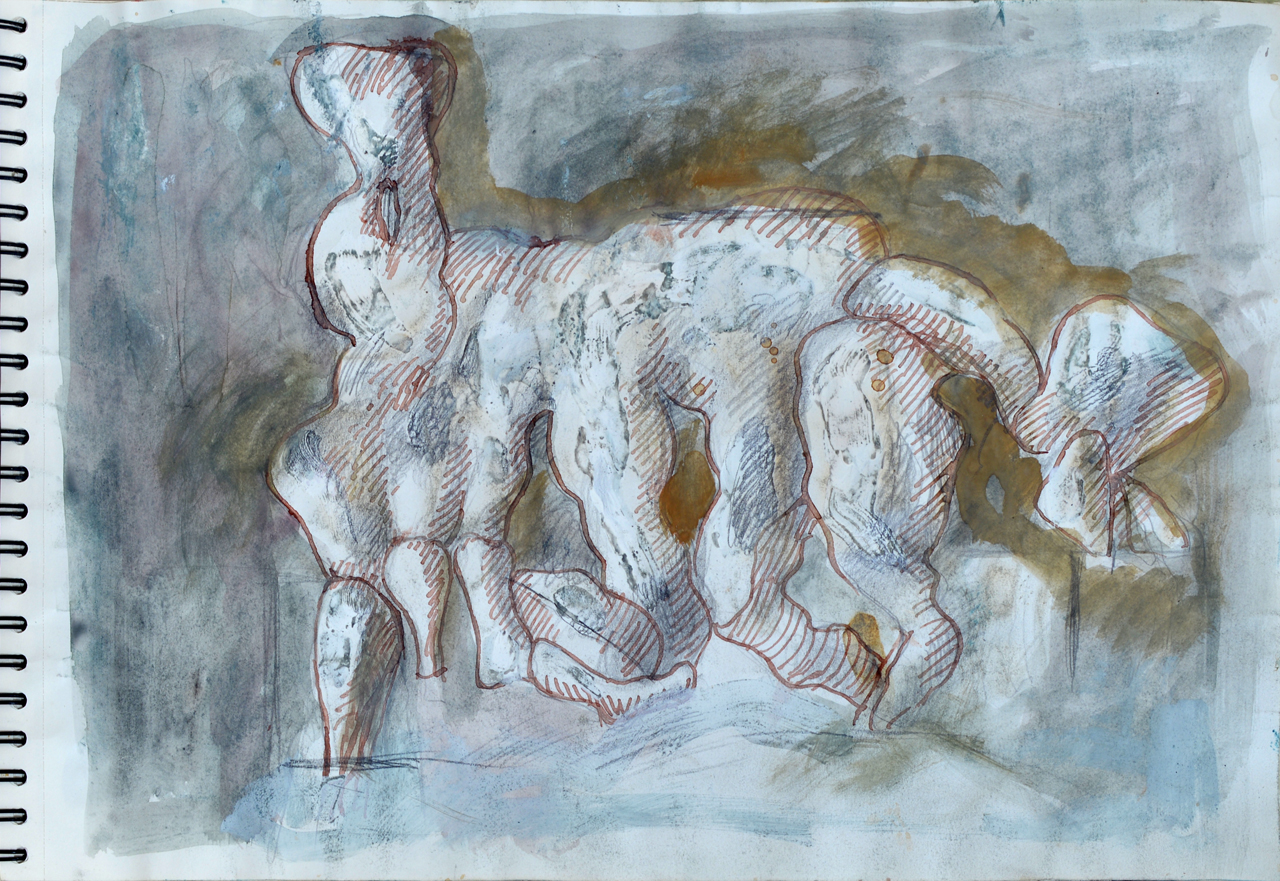
Untitled

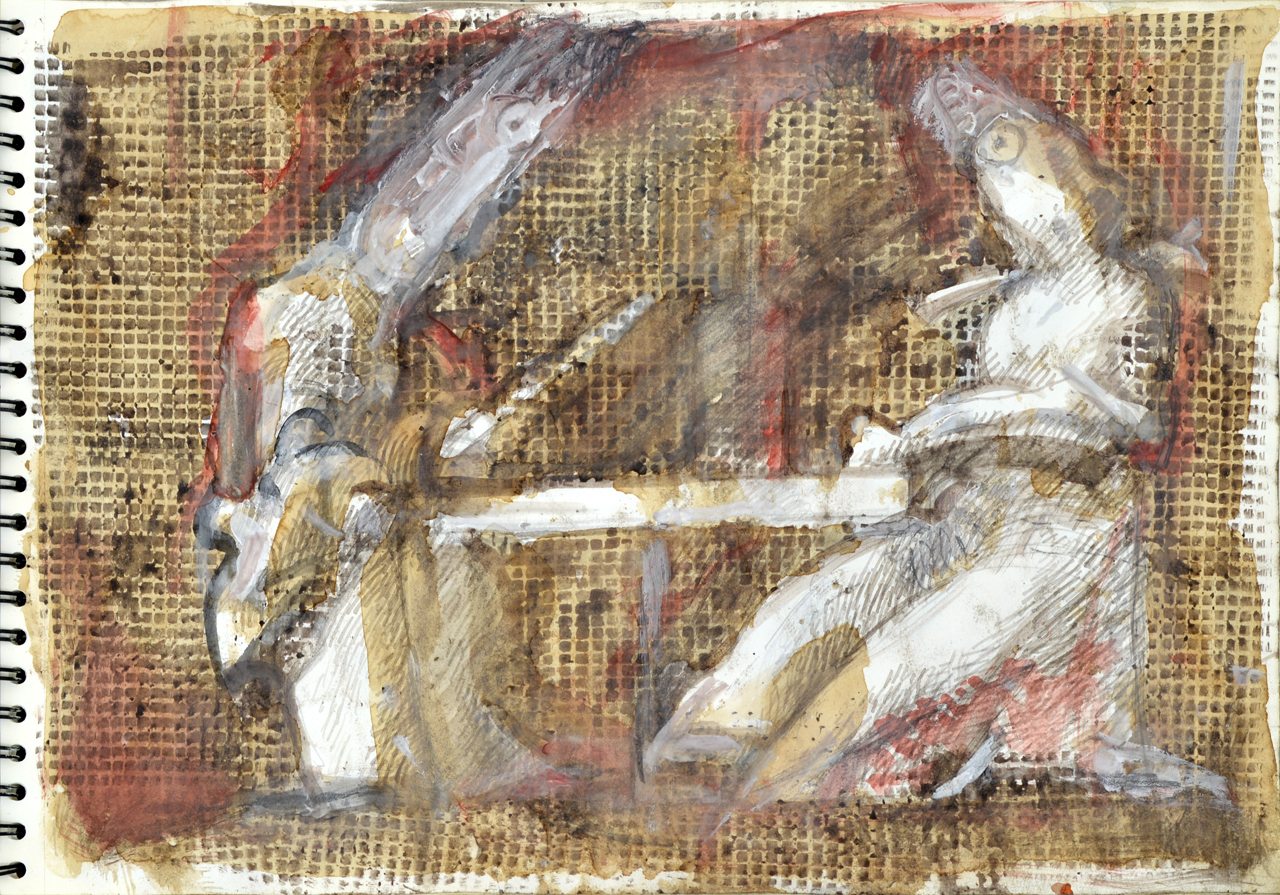
At the table

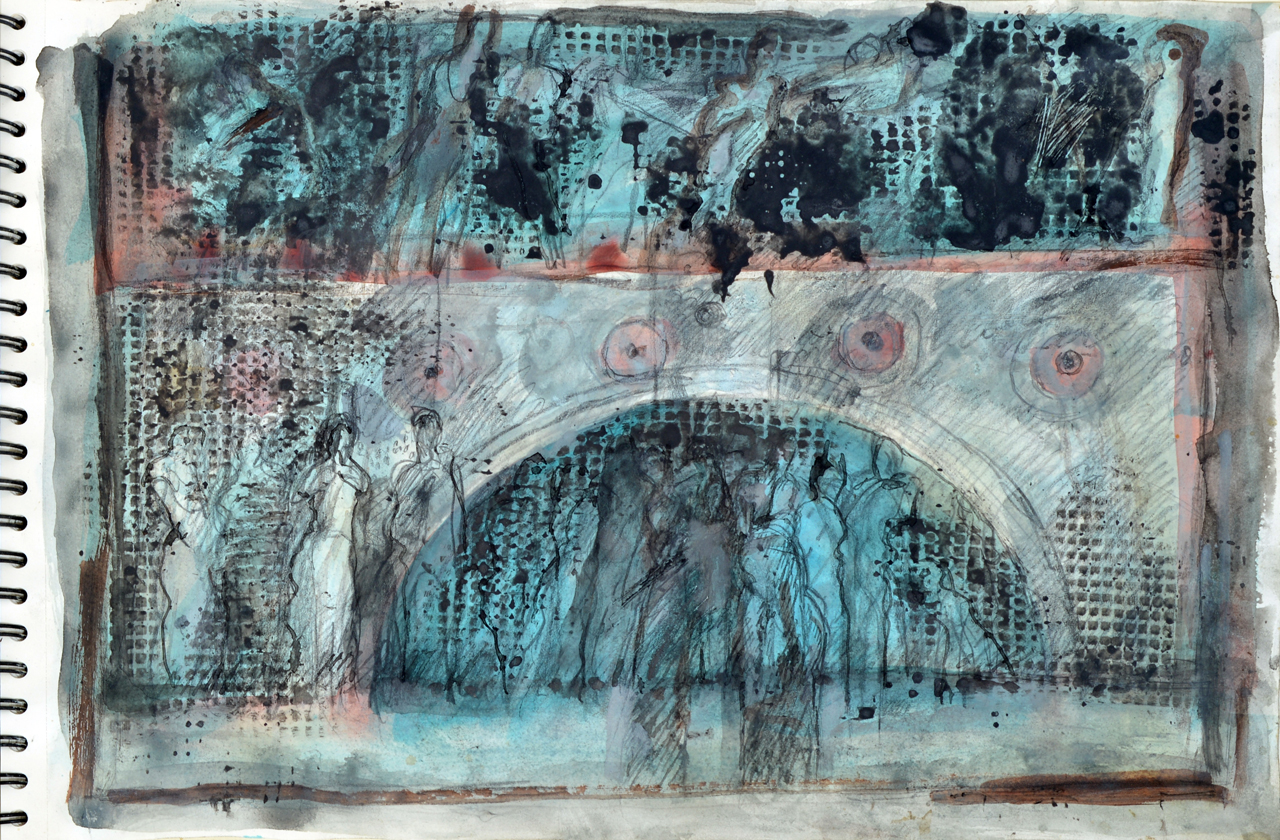
Bridge in Carrara

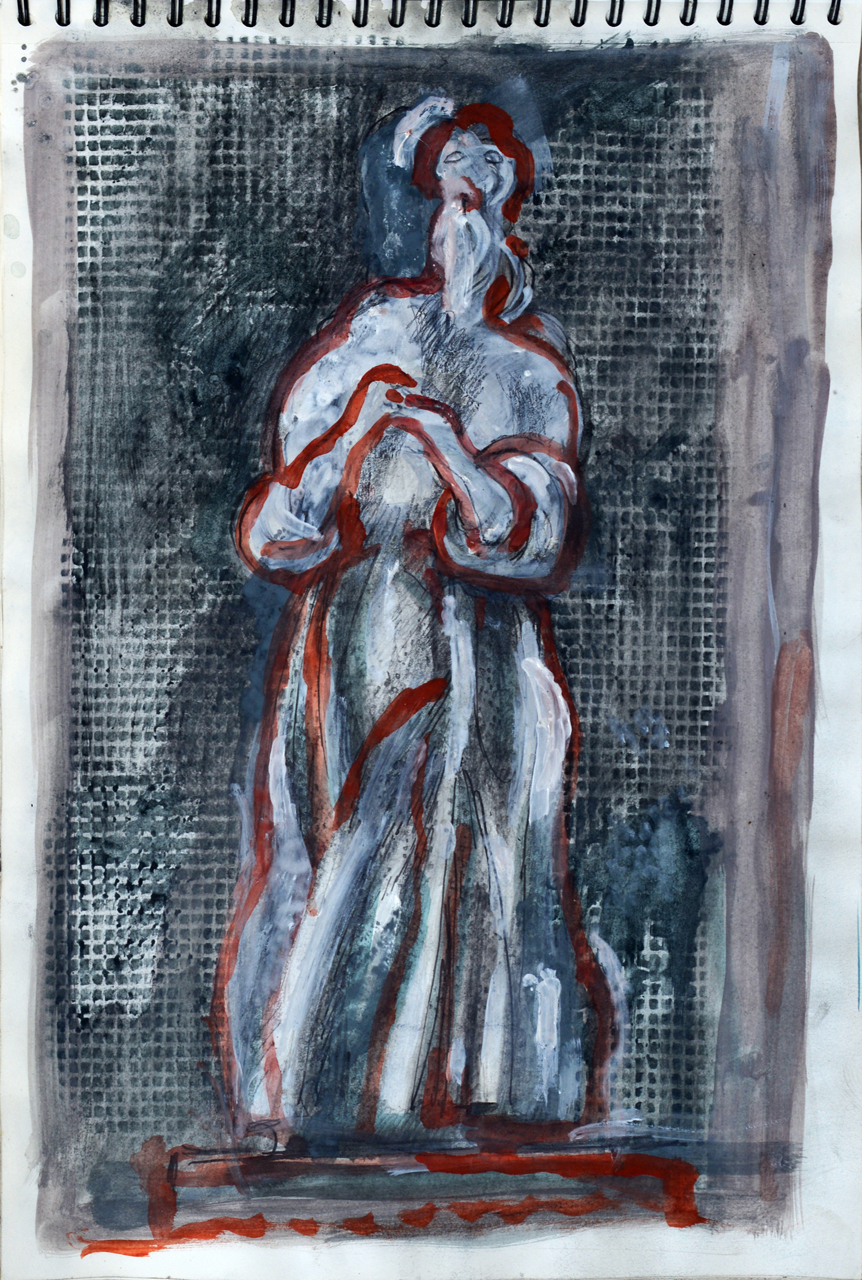
Saint

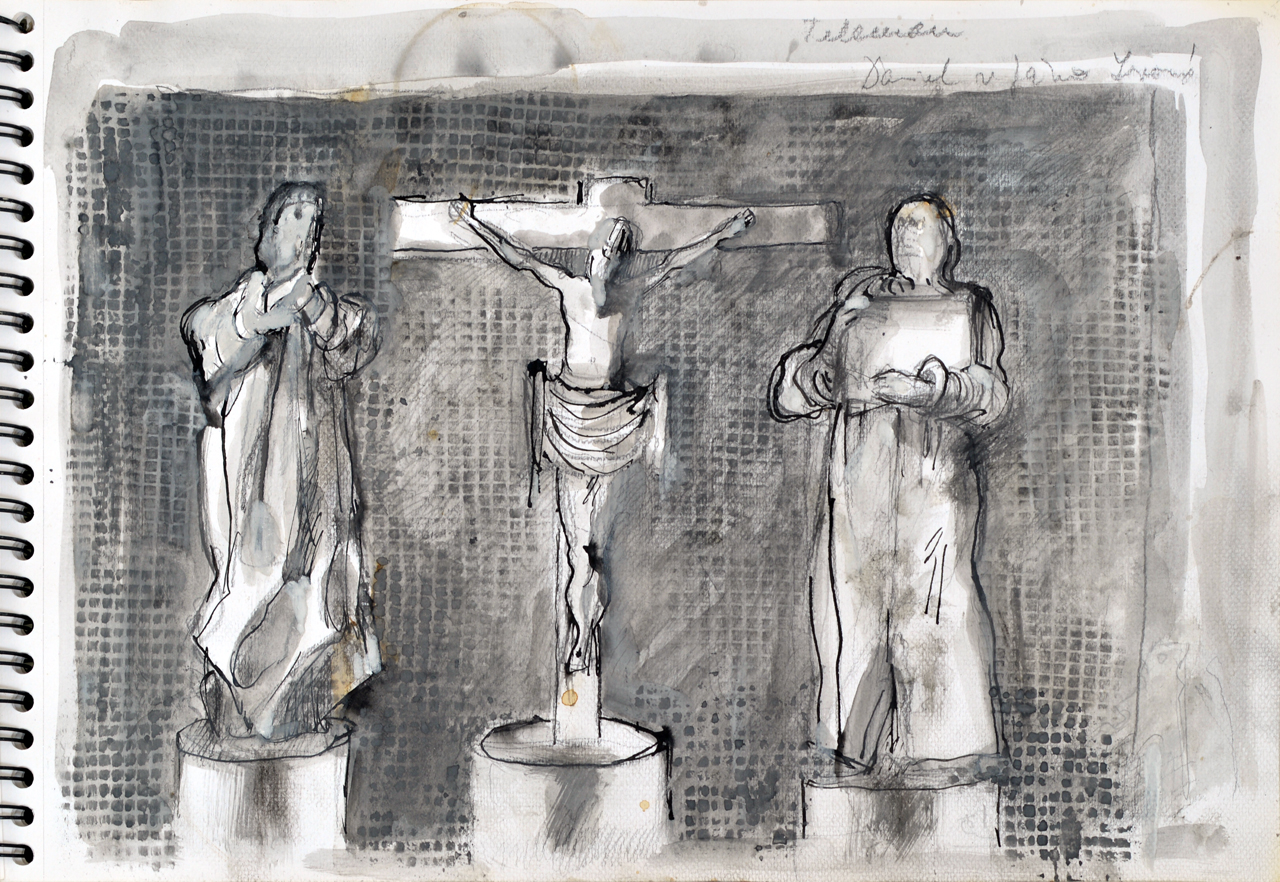
Calvary

=== Representation in collections ===
- National Gallery in Prague
- Gallery of the Central Bohemian Region in Kutná Hora
- Gallery of Modern Art in Hradec Králové
- Gallery of Modern Art in Roudnice nad Labem
- North Bohemian Gallery of Fine Arts in Litoměřice
- Gallery of Fine Arts, Cheb
- East Bohemian Gallery in Pardubice
- Gallery of Fine Arts Jičín
- Horácká Gallery of Fine Arts, Nové Město na Moravě
- Regional Gallery of Fine Arts in Zlín
- Museum of Art Olomouc
- District Museum of Local History, Jindřichův Hradec
- Orlická Gallery, Rychnov nad Kněžnou
- East Slovak Gallery, Košice
- Golden Goose Gallery, Prague
- Collection of the Paris Coin Mint, Paris

=== Exhibitions ===
==== Author´s ====
- 1966 Jan Hendrych, Young Gallery, Mánes, Prague
- 1967 Jan Hendrych: Sculptures, Gallery of Art, Ostrov
- 1988 Jan Hendrych: Sculptures, Old Town Hall, Cross Corridor, Prague
- 1999 Jan Hendrych: Sculptures, Nový Svět Gallery, Prague
- 1999 Jan Hendrych: Sculptures, Synagogue Exhibition Hall, Hranice
- 2001Jan Hendrych, Ztichlá klika Gallery, Prague
- 2001/2 Jan Hendrych: The Sixties, Ztichlá klika Gallery, Prague
- 2002 Jan Hendrych: Sculptures and Drawings, Magna Gallery, Ostrava
- 2005 Jan Hendrych: Sculptures, Drawings, Prints, Czech Museum of Fine Arts, Prague
- 2005 Jan Hendrych: Sculptures, Drawings, Prints, Wortner House of the Alš South Bohemian Gallery, České Budějovice
- 2005 Jan Hendrych: Sculptures, Drawings, Prints, Regional Gallery of Highlands in Jihlava
- 2009 Jan Hendrych, Benedikt Rejt Gallery, Louny
- 2011/12 Jan Hendrych: Hell's 75, Litera Gallery, Prague
- 2012 Jan Hendrych, Regional Gallery of Highlands in Jihlava
- 2016 Jan Hendrych / Rastislav Jacko / Teacher and Pupil II, Gallery of Modern Art in Roudnice nad Labem
- 2017 Jan Hendrych, Topič Salon and Club, Prague
- 2020 Jan Hendrych, Gallery MY - House of J. and J.V. Scheybal, Jablonec nad Nisou

==== Collective (selection) ====
- 1965 1. biennale form przestrzennych Elblag, Galeria El, Elbląg, Poland
- 1965 Małarstwo a rzeźba z Pragi, Kraków, Poland
- 1969/1970 Czech and Slovak Medals 1508–1968, Slovak National Gallery, Bratislava
- 1970 Prager Künstler. Gemälde, Graphik, Plastik, Haus am Kleistpark, Berlin
- 1970 Tschechische Skulptur des 20. Jahrhunderts: Von Myslbek bis zur Gegenwart, Schloß Charlottenburg - Orangerie, Berlin
- 1970 Sodobna češkoslovaška umetnost, Mestna galerija Ljubljana, Piran, Zagreb
- 1973/1974 La médaille Tchécoslovaque à la monnaie de Paris, Musée de la Monnaie, Paris
- 1980 Tshekkoslovakialaisia kuvia / Tjeckoslovakiska bilder, Helsingin Taidehalli / Helsingfors Konsthall, Helsinki, Wäinä Aaltosen museo, Turku
- 1985 A mai csehszlovák szobrászat, Műcsarnok, Kunsthalle Budapest)
- 1987 Salon de Tokyo. International member's exhibition, Roma Gallery, Tokyo
- 1988 Rzeźba czeska i słowacka 1948–1988, Galeria Związku Artystów Rzeźbiarzy, Varšava (Warszawa)
- 1988/12 Prague - Paris: Art and Artists on Czechoslovak and French Medals of the 20th Century, Wallenstein Riding Hall, Prague
- 1989 Salon de Tokyo. International culture exchange exhibition, Ota-Kumin Plaza Art Hall, Tokyo
- 1990 Salon de Tokyo. International member's exhibition, Togen Gallery, Hamamatsu (Shizuoka)
- 1992 Minisalon, Prague, Mons, Hollywood, Cincinnati, New York, Indianapolis, Rapids, Albuquerque, Chicago, Columbia, Nord Dartmouth, Saint Petersburg, Fort Myers, Brussels, Jakarta, Ubud, Surabaya, Paris
- 1993/1994 New Figuration, North Bohemian Gallery of Fine Arts in Litoměřice, East Bohemian Gallery, Pardubice, Moravian Gallery in Brno, House of Art, Opava, Regional Gallery of Highlands in Jihlava
- 1993 Exhibition of Contemporary Czech Sculpture, Mánes, Prague
- 1994 Focal Points of Rebirth, Prague Municipal Gallery
- 1995 Artchemo 1968/1969, East Bohemian Gallery in Pardubice, Regional Gallery of Highlands in Jihlava, House of Art, Zlín, Gallery Médium, Bratislava, Old Town Hall, Prague
- 1998 Announcement of Icarus' Flight: the Olomouc Sixties, Museum of Art Olomouc - Museum of Modern Art, Olomouc
- 1999/2000 The Art of Accelerated Time. Czech Art Scene 1958–1968, Prague, Gallery of Fine Arts, Cheb
- 2000 Die Botschaft der Apokalypse, Domschatz - und Diözesanmuseum, Eichstätt
- 2007/2008 Czech Art of the 20th Century: 1970–2007, Aleš South Bohemian Gallery in Hluboká nad Vltavou
- 2009 Figurama 09, Tomas Bata University in Zlín, Poznania Zamek Centre of Culture, Poznan, Golden House of European Culture, České Budějovice, Berlaymont building, Brussels, Old Town Hall, Prague
- 2017 Intersalon - Continuatio Quadrati, 21st International Exhibition of Contemporary Art, Mariánská Gallery, České Budějovice
- 2018 Anatomie skoku do prázdna: Rok 1968 a výtvarné umění v Československu / The Anatomy of a Leap into the Void: The Year 1968 and Art in Czechoslovakia, Exhibition Hall Masné krámy, Plzeň

=== Permanent exhibitions ===
- 2013 Století relativity: Stálá expozice výtvarného umění 20. století / Century of Relativity: Permanent exposition of fine arts of the 20th century, Museum of Modern Art, Olomouc
- 2014–2017 States of Mind / Behind the Image, Gallery of the Central Bohemian Region (GASK), Kutná Hora
- 2017 - 2025 States of Mind / Behind the Image: Variations and Interventions, Gallery of the Central Bohemian Region (GASK), Kutná Hora
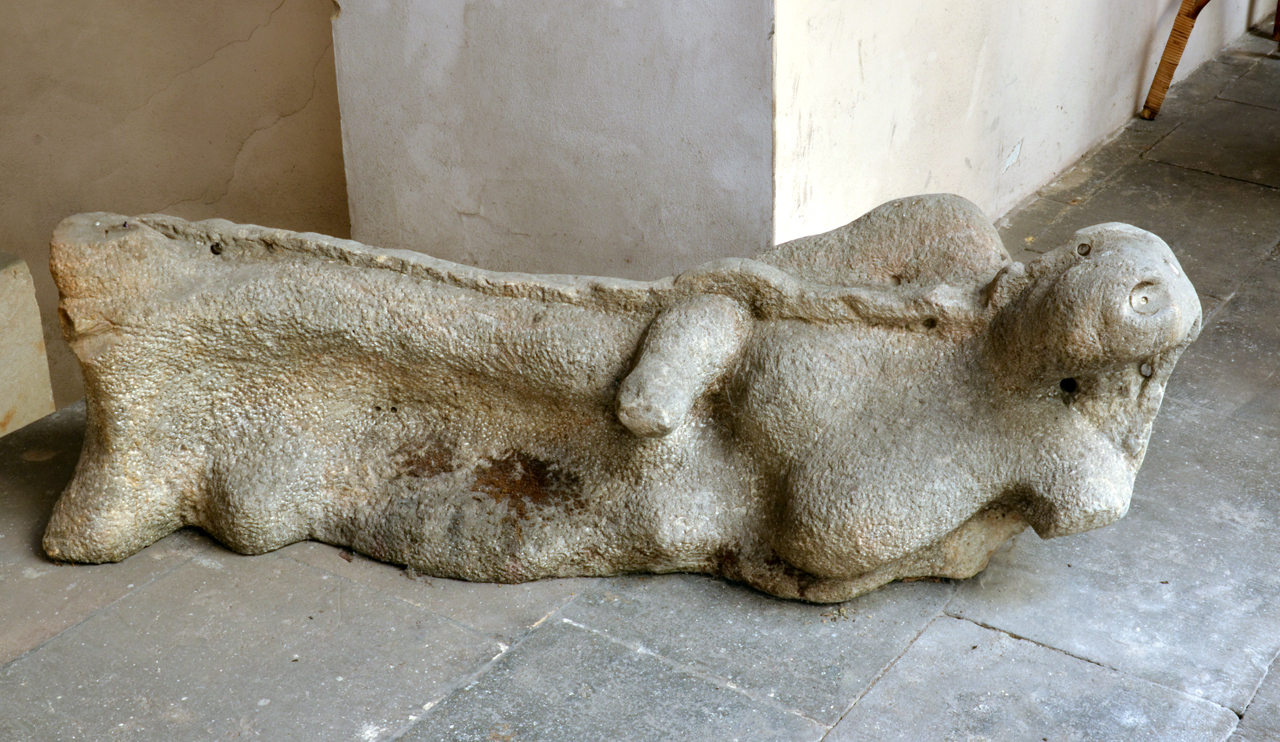
Lying (small), sandstone, SGVU Litoměřice

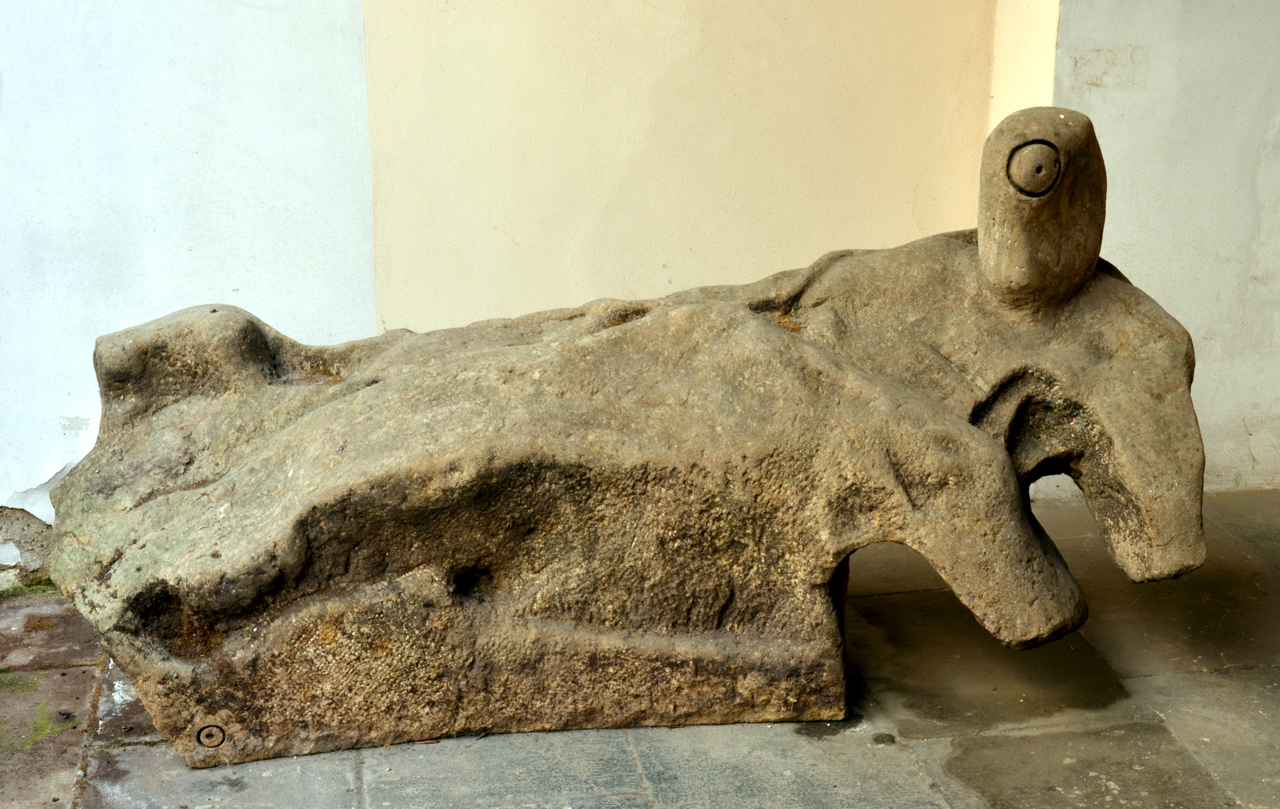
Lying, sandstone, SGVU Litoměřice

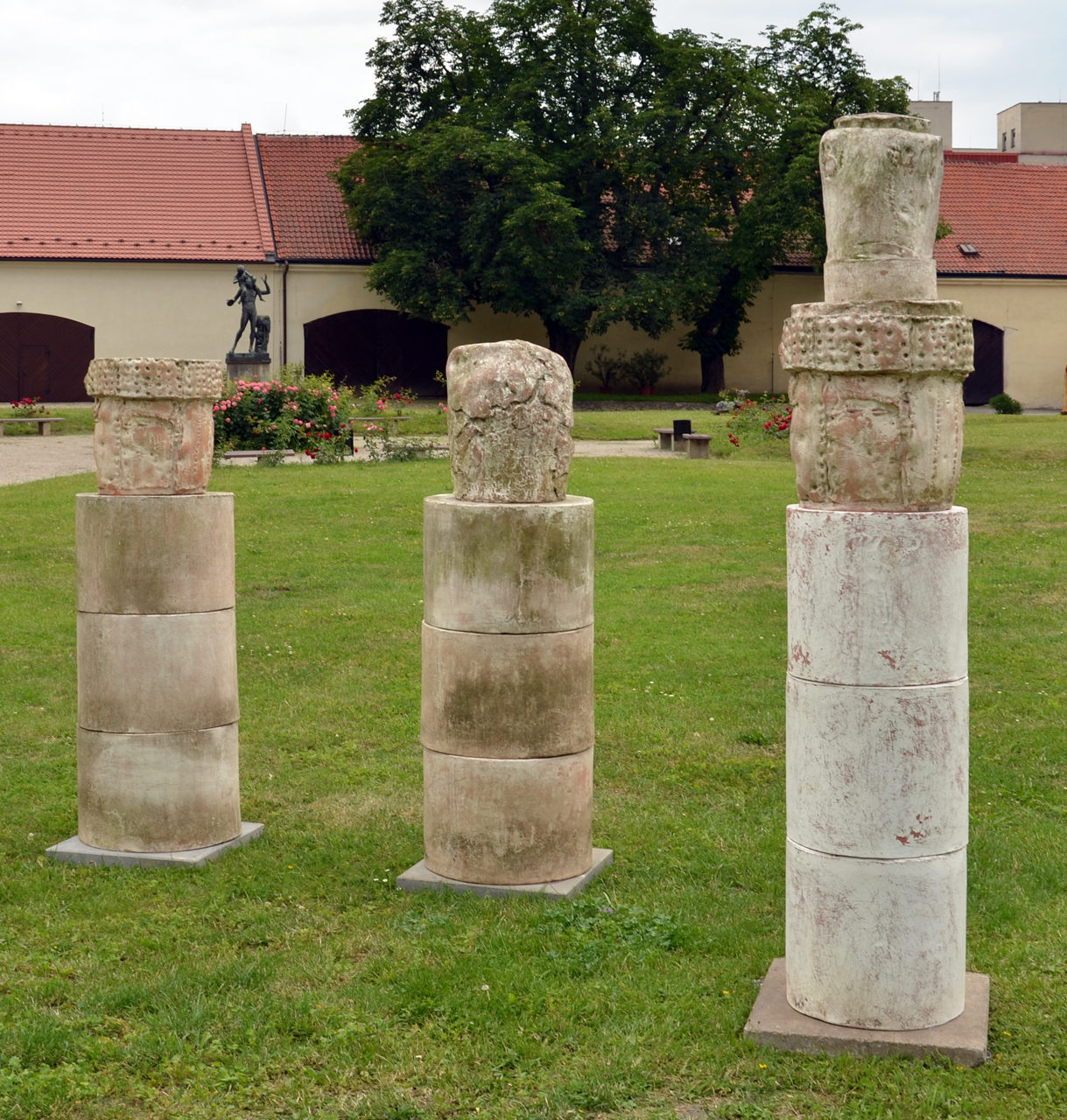
Columns with heads, Summer ceramic sculpture, Roztoky 2015

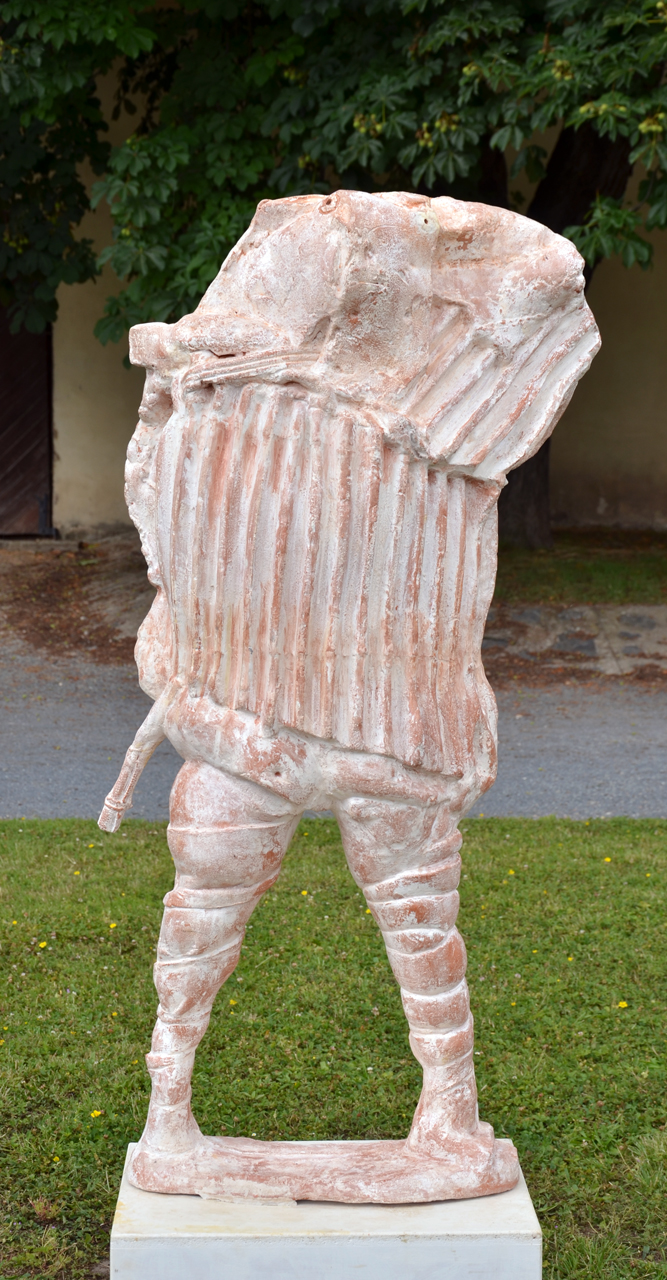
Guard I, Summer ceramic sculpture, Roztoky 2016

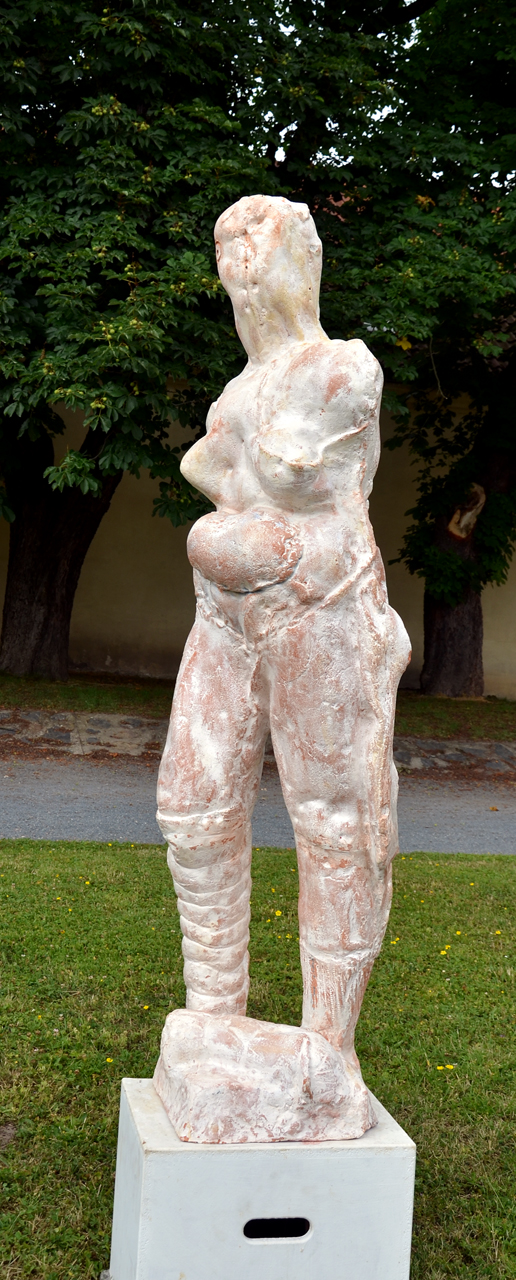
Guard II, Summer ceramic sculpture, Roztoky 2016

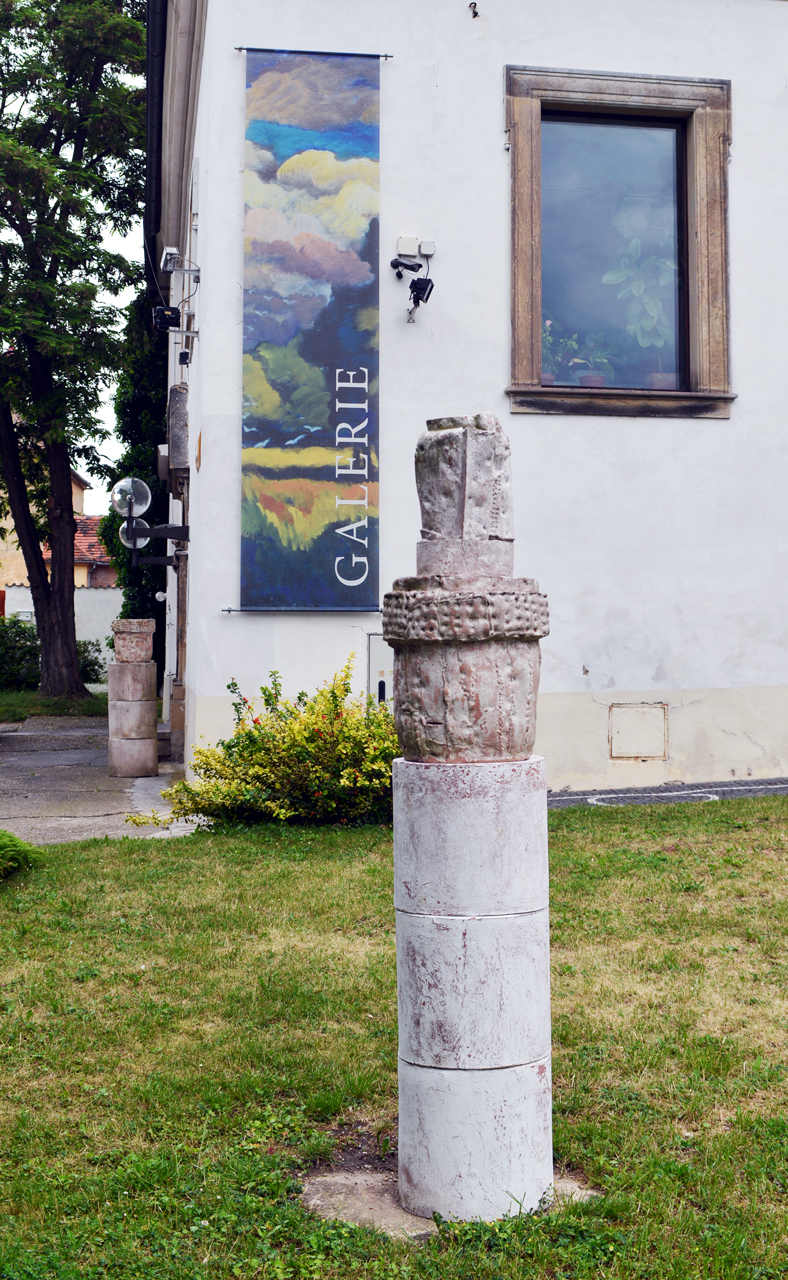
Head I (2015), Gallery of Modern Art, Roudnice

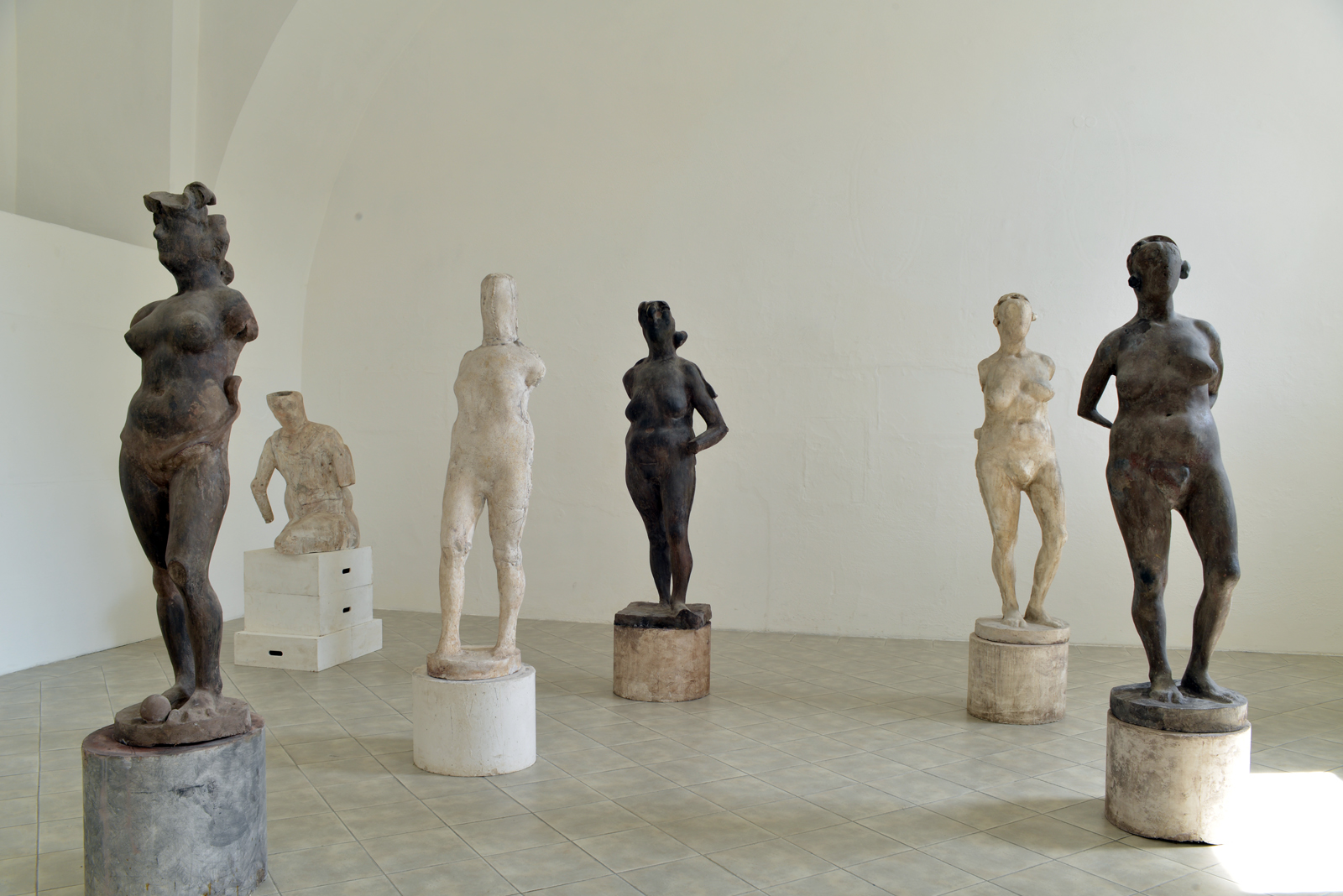
Exhibition, Gallery of Modern Art, Roudnice (2015–2016)

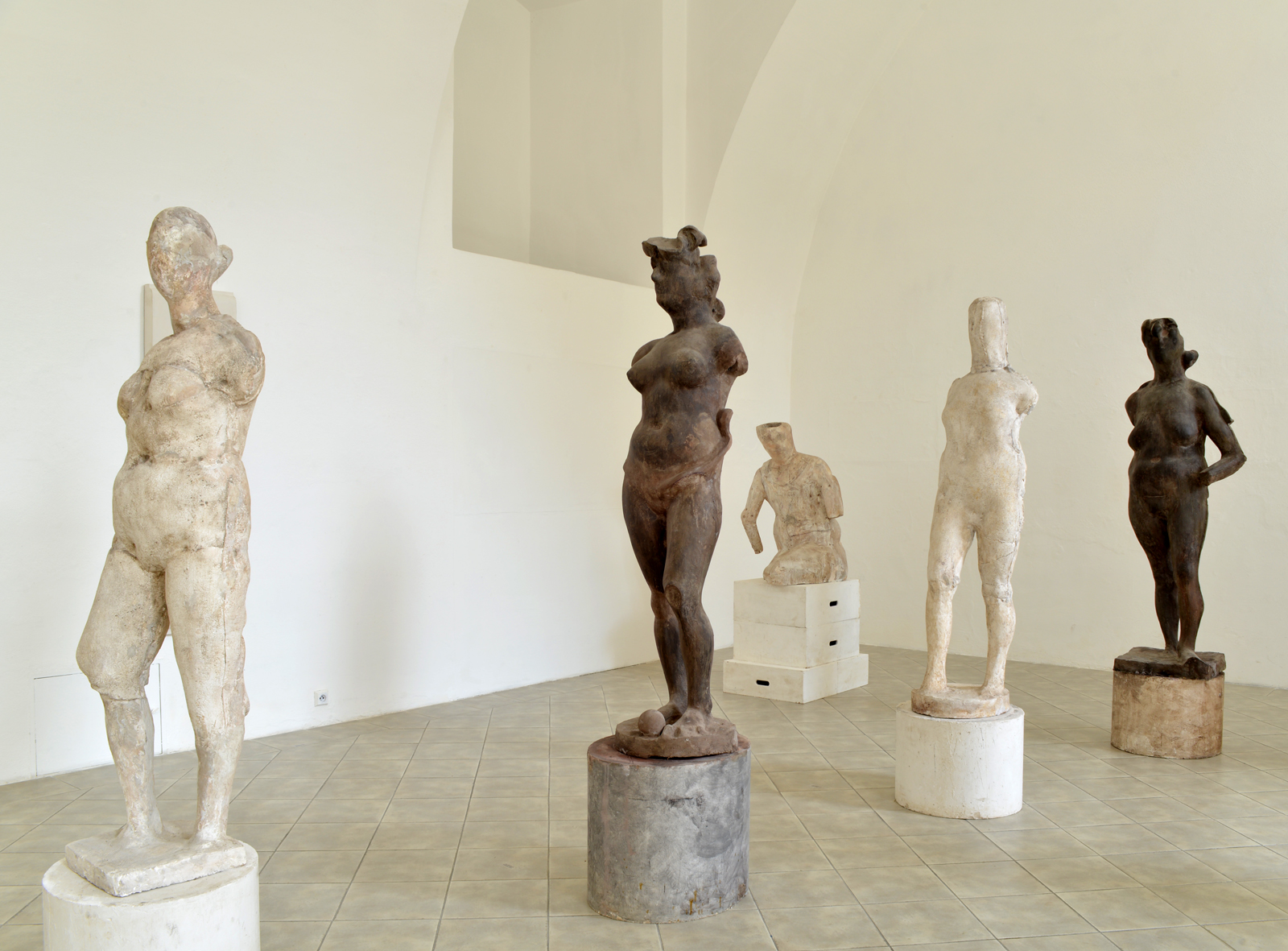
Exhibition, Gallery of Modern Art, Roudnice (2015–2016)

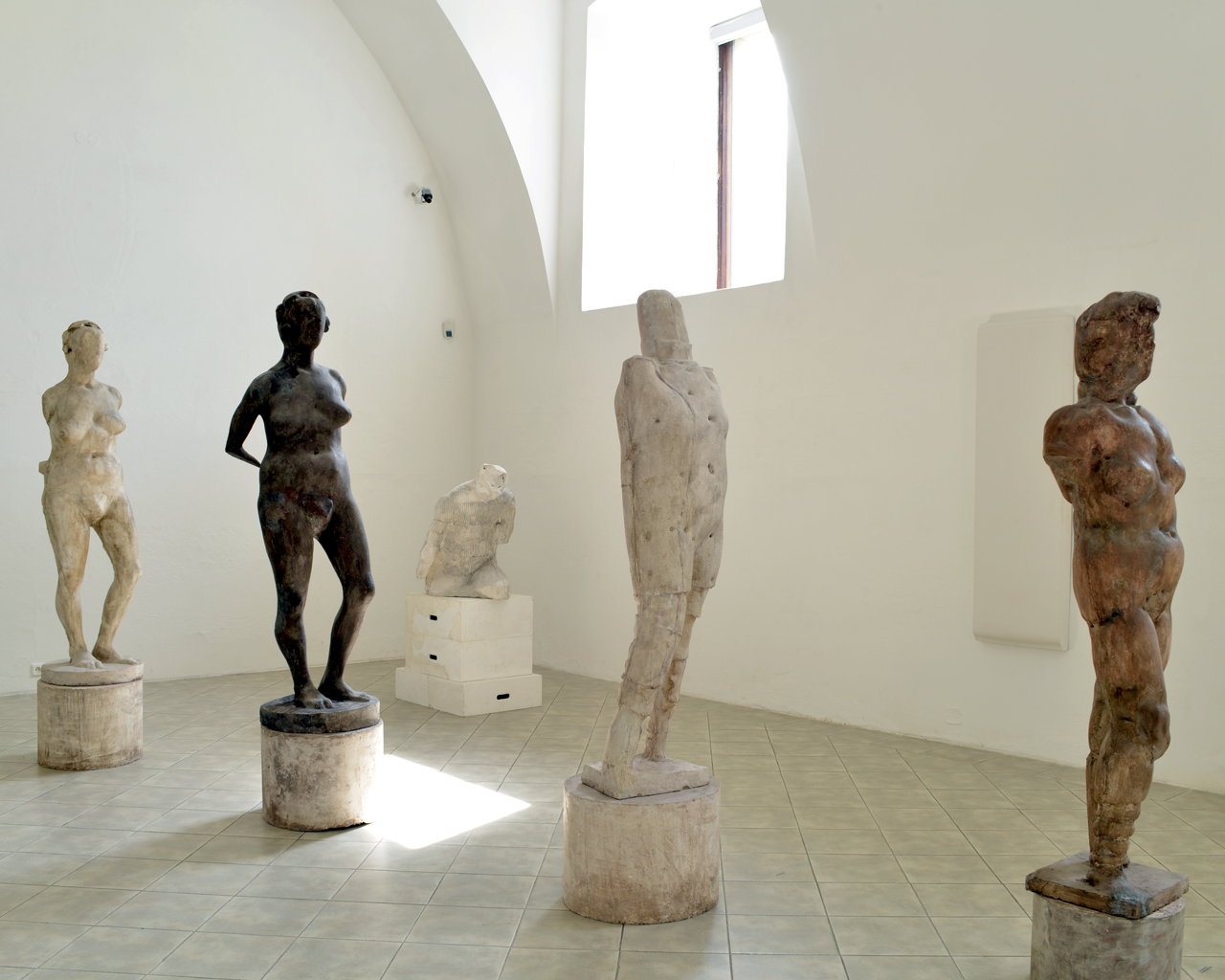
Exhibition, Gallery of Modern Art, Roudnice (2015–2016)

=== Symposia ===
- 1963 Europahaus, Vienna
- 1965 Symposium of Spatial Forms, Elbląg,
- 1969 Symposium of Sculptures in Metal, VCHZŽ Košice
- 1969 Artchemo, Pardubice
- 1992 International Sculpture Symposium Hořice
- 1994 International Jug Symposium, Hředle
- 1998 Sculpture Summer Jirčany
- 1998 International Sculpture Workshop, Ružomberok
- 1999 Symposium Guilin, China
- 2009, 2010, 2012 Smaltart, Vítkovice

=== Realizations ===
- 1965 Inclined figure (300 cm), iron, Elbląg
- 1969 Big Head (500 cm), iron, Košice
- 1971 central sculpture, sandstone, Stachy cemetery
- 1973 ceramic wall, Chedok Berlin
- 1976 5 reliefs, bronze, Marble Palace, Tehran
- Bull, sandstone, SOU Písnice
- 1984 Sculpture with plant motifs, Lhotka housing estate, Prague
- 1985 Fountain, sandstone, South Town, Prague
- 1985 Fountains, Metro B-Smíchovské nádraží, Prague
- 1986-7 Labe (300x200 cm), sandstone, Přední Labská
- 1992 Inclined Figure, granite, Manchester by Sea, USA
- 1995 commemorative plaque, Prague Uprising, Old Town Hall
- 1996 Bridge, granite, symp. Guilin, China
- 1997 UNESCO commemorative plaque, bronze, Old Town Hall, Prague
- 1999 memorial plaque to F. Kafka, bronze, Kinsky Palace, Prague
- Bust of Wenceslaus Hollar, bronze, Soukenická, Prague
- 2003 monument to J. Krčín of Jelčany, bronze, marble, Třeboň
- 2005 memorial plaque to Bertha von Suttner, bronze, Kinsky Palace, Prague
- 2008 The Way of the Cross (Redemption), sandstone, Kuks
- 2016 Calvary sculpture U Třech Svatých, cement, Kunratice, Prague
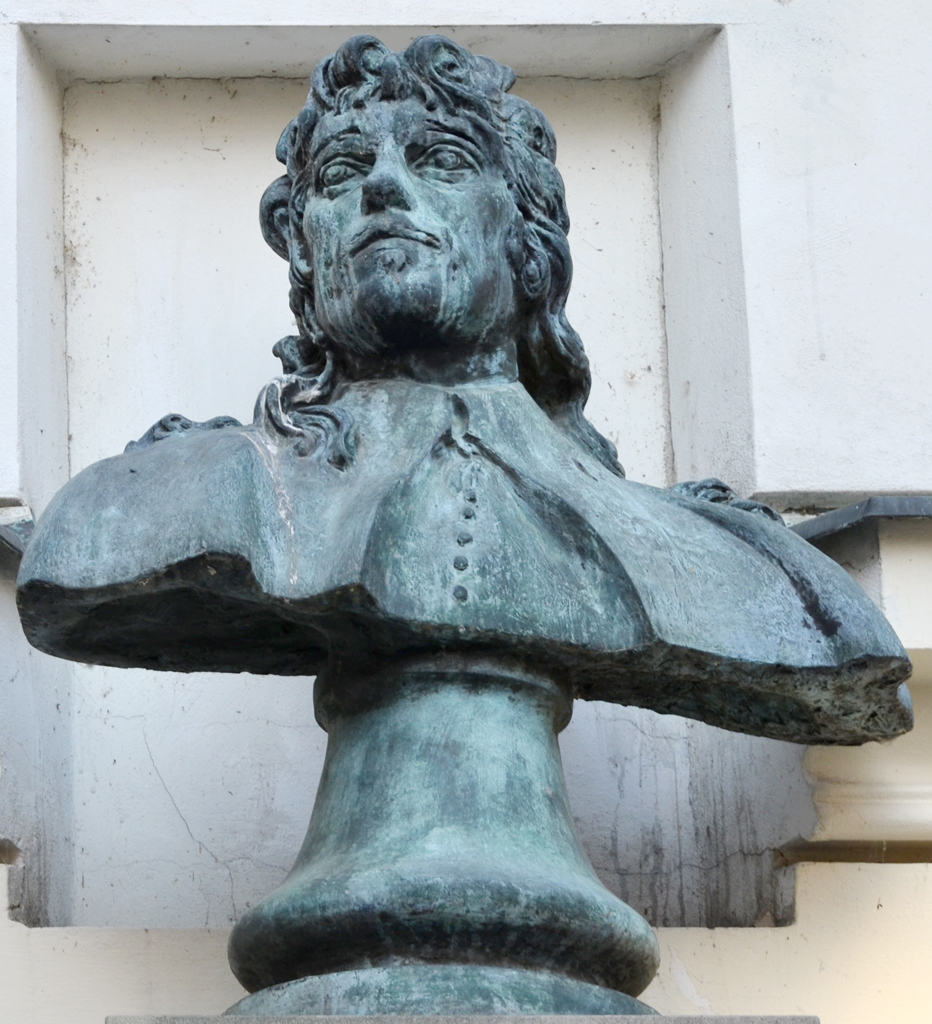
Bust of Václav Hollar, bronze, Soukenická, Prague

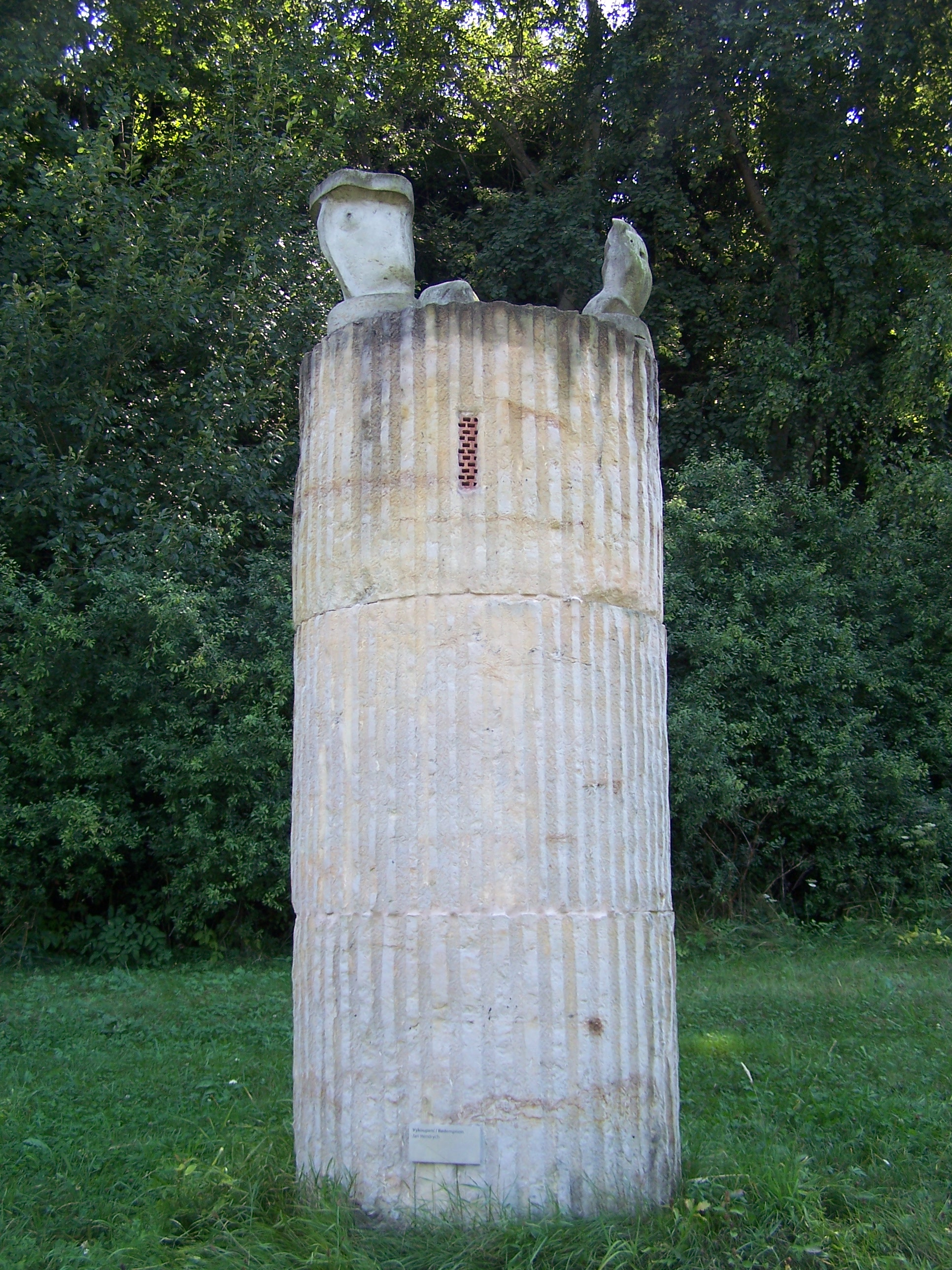
The Way of the Cross (Redemption), sandstone, Kuks

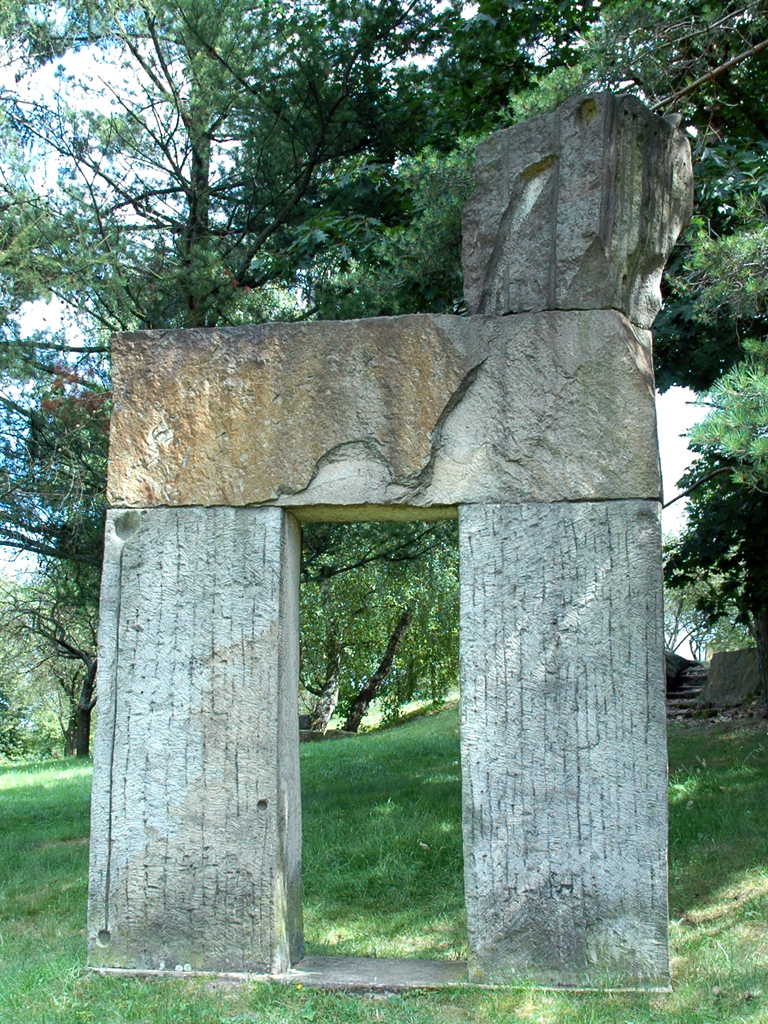
Bridge, 1990, Hořice

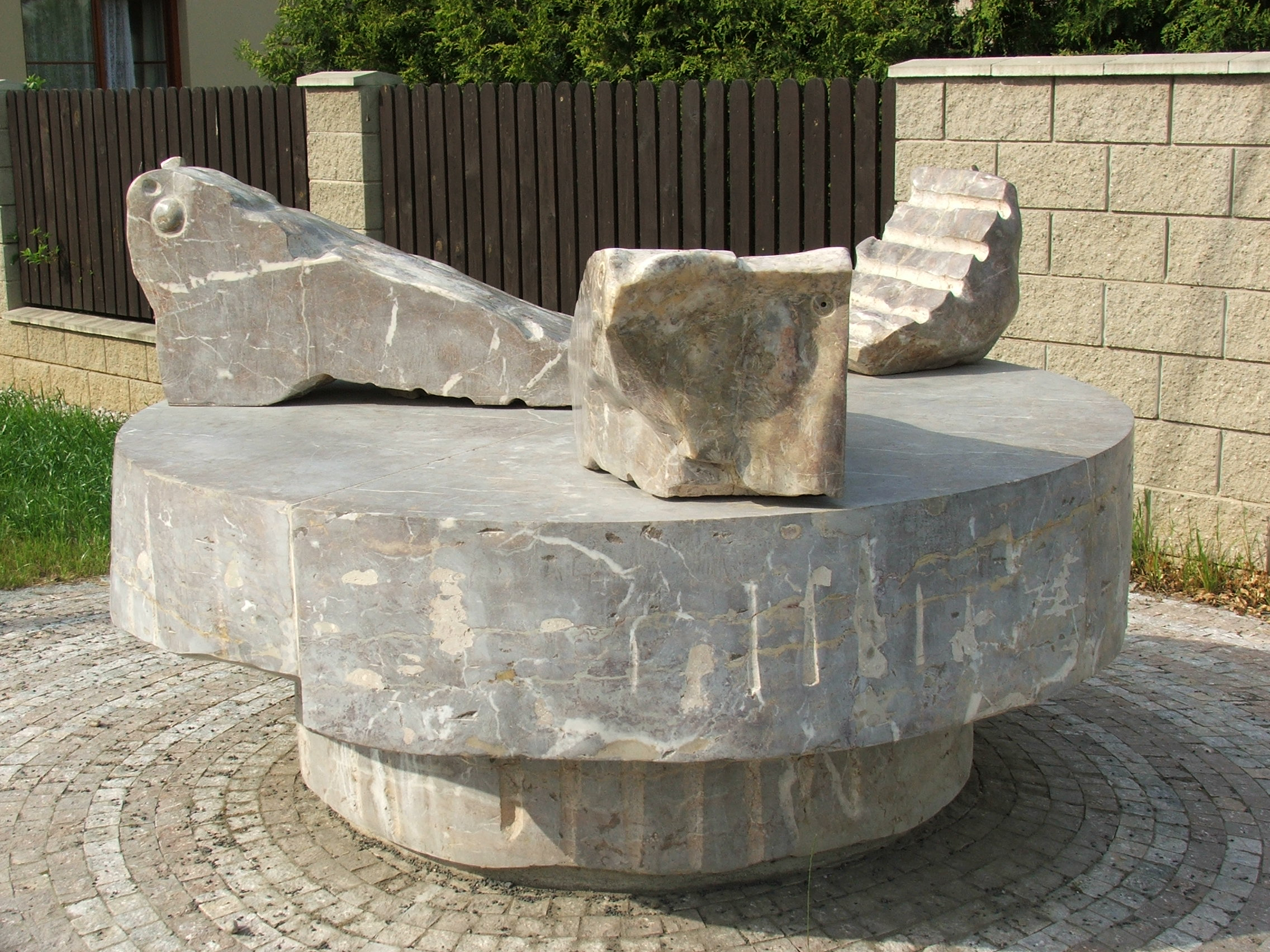
Carousel, Way of Marble, Dobřichovice

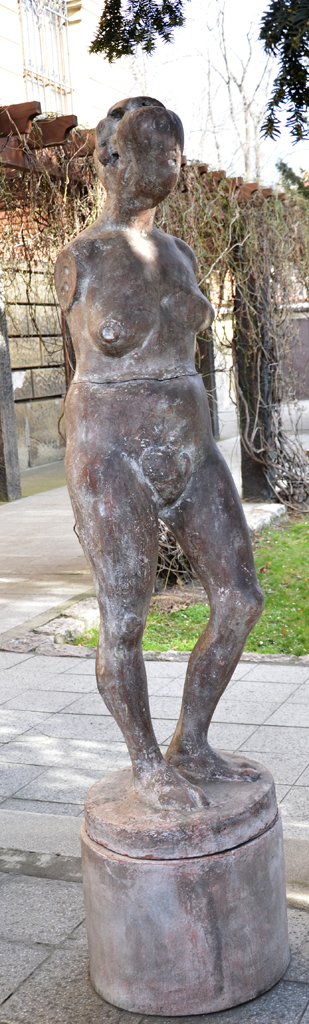
Study of the Nude without Hands (2006–2007), Museum of Decorative Arts in Prague

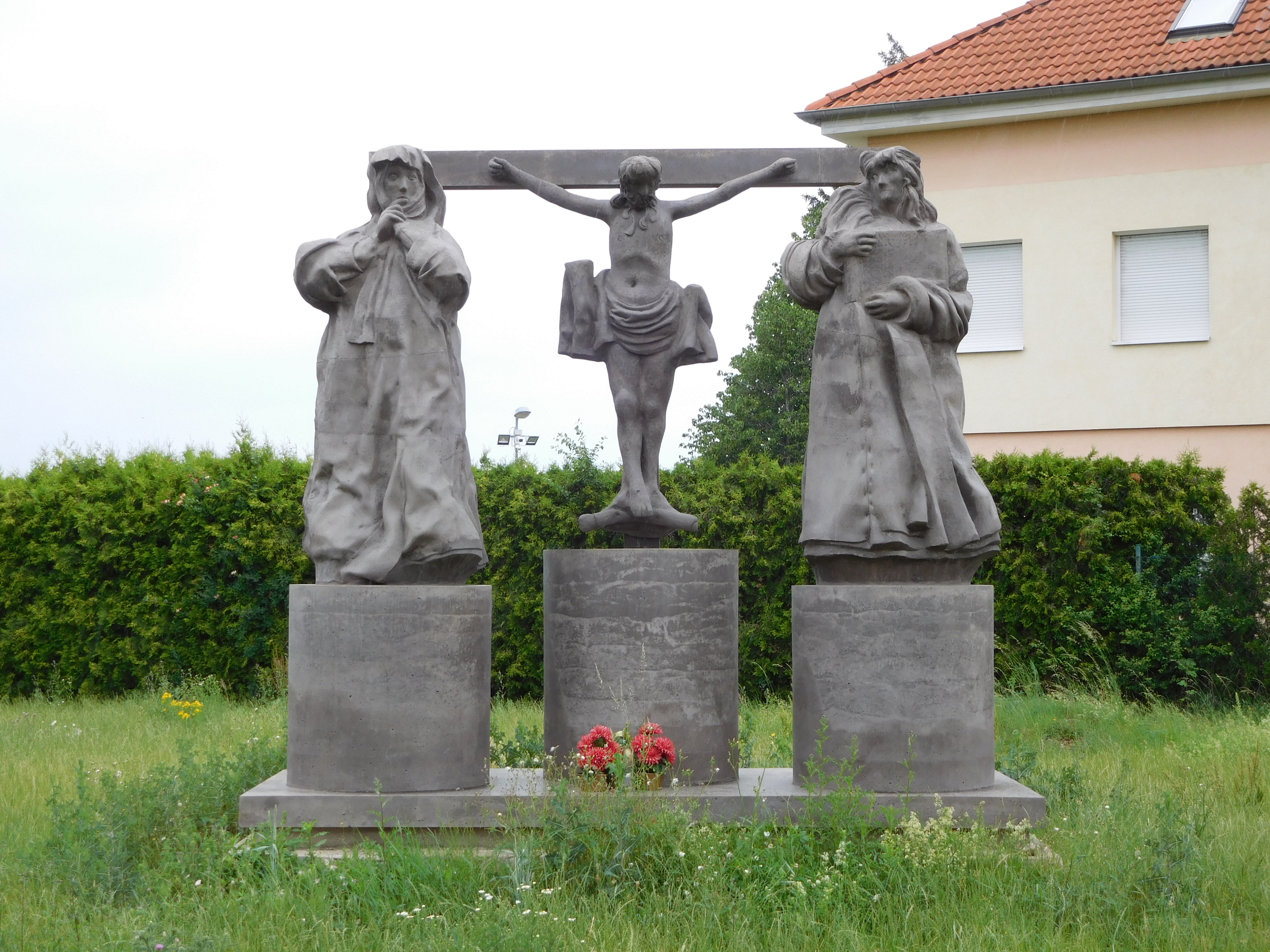
Calvary, 2016, Kunratice (Prague)

== Sources ==
=== Literature ===
- Hynek Glos, Petr Vizina, Stará garda / The Old Guard, Argo, Prague 2016, pp. 34–41, ISBN 978-80-257-1881-0

=== Catalogues ===
- Miroslav Koval: Jan Hendrych: Kresby a sochy / Drawings and Sculptures, cat. 8 p., Galerie Jiřího Jílka, Šumperk 2018
- Ilona Víchová Czakó: Jan Hendrych: Sochy a kresby / Sculptures and Drawings, cat. 4 p., 1. Art Consulting Brno - Praha 2017
- Alena Potůčková: Jan Hendrych, Rastislav Jacko - Učitel a žák II Teacher and student II, Gallery of Modern Art Roudnice nad Labem 2016, ISBN 978-80-87512-50-0
- Václav Erben: Jan Hendrych, kat. 243 p., Galerie Benedikta Rejta / Benedikt Rejt Gallery, Louny, 2009 ISBN 978-80-85051-12-4
- Jan Hendrych, Jan Šmolka, Petr Pivoda: Jan Hendrych: Plastiky a kresby / Sculptures and Drawings, cat. 37 p., Galerie Beseda, Ostrava 2006
- Jan Kříž: Jan Hendrych, kat. 116 s., České muzeum výtvarných umění / Czech Museum of Fine Arts, Prague, 2005 ISBN 80-7056-126-2
- Richard Drury: Jan Hendrych, cat. 2 p., Magna Gallery, Ostrava 2002
- Václav Erben: Jan Hendrych: Šedesátá léta, cat. 36 p., Ztichlá klika Gallery, Prague, 2001
- Jan Rous: Jan Hendrych, cat. 4 p., Municipal Museum and Gallery, 1999
- Josef Kroutvor: Jan Hendrych: Mosty a brány, cat. 42 p., Ztichlá klika Gallery, Prague, 1997
- Marie Muchová Halířová: Jan Hendrych: Plastiky / Sculptures, cat. 28 p., Galerie hlavního města Prahy 1988
- Jiří Šetlík, Plastiky Jana Hendrycha / Sculptures by Jan Hendrych, cat. 12 p., Gallery of Art, Ostrov 1967
- Jan Hendrych, cat. 4 p, Svaz československých výtvarných umělců / Union of Czechoslovak Artists 1966
