= Jiří Kačer =

Czech sculptor

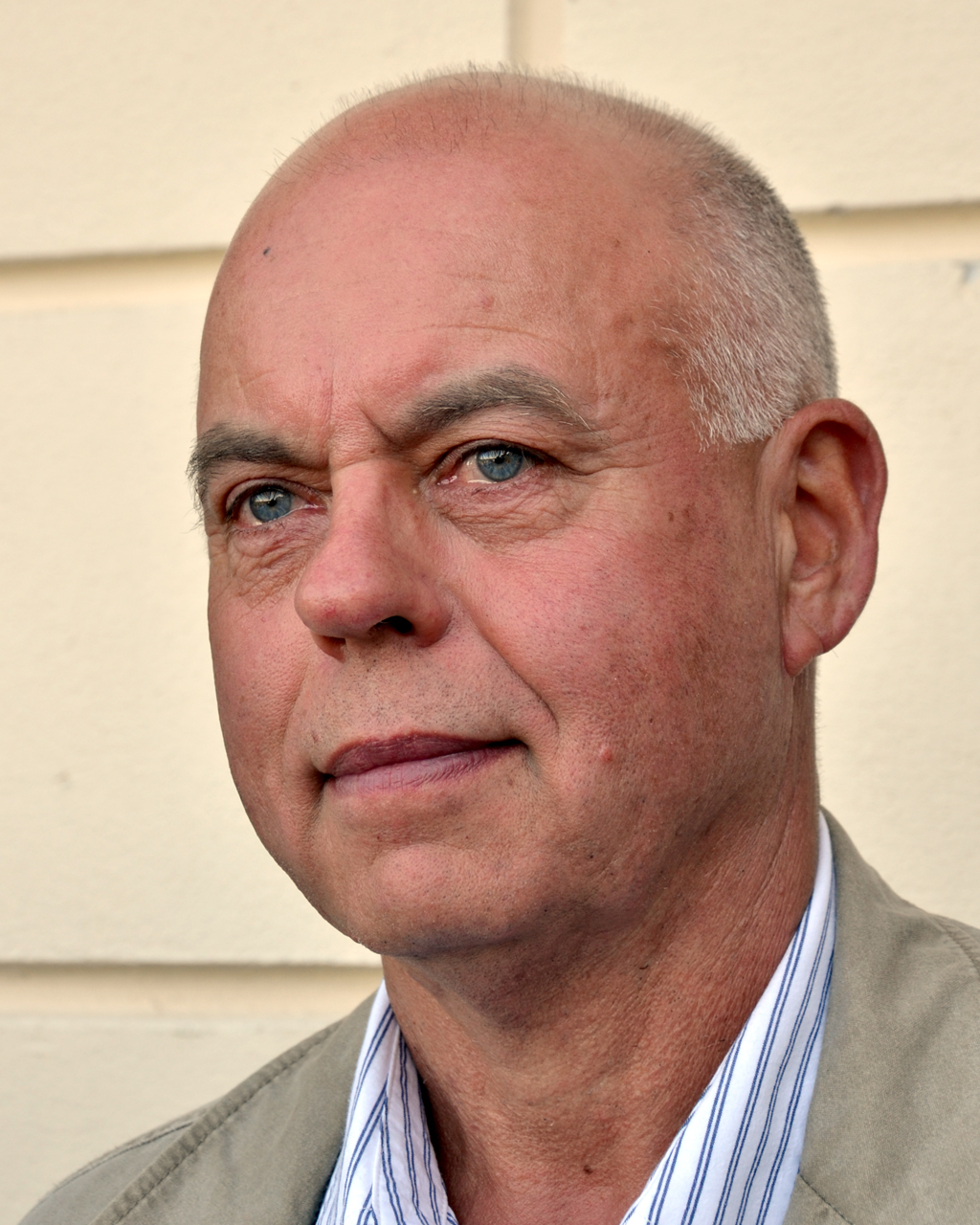
- Kačer in 2016
- Born: 9 April 1952 (age 74); Prague, Czechoslovakia
- Education: Academy of Fine Arts in Prague
- Occupations: sculptor, restorer, academy teacher

Jiří Kačer (born 9 April 1952) is a Czech sculptor, restorer and academic teacher.

== Life ==
Jičí Kačer was born on 9 April 1952 in Prague. From 1967 to 1969, he attended the School of Arts and Crafts in Prague, specializing in stucco work, where he learned the basics of the craft and modeling. In the second half of the 1960s, he had the opportunity to learn about Czech modern art at exhibitions in Prague and to meet the creators of New Figuration. In the period following the Warsaw Pact invasion of Czechoslovakia, when Prague's exhibition halls were dominated by pro-regime normalization artists, he continued his studies at the Secondary School of Stonemasonry and Sculpture in Hořice (1970–1974) under Prof. R. Šrajbr. There he encountered high-quality sculptures from previous International sculpture symposia installed on Gothard Hill. He gained knowledge of working with sandstone and the basics of the procedures necessary for restoring sculptures, which he then used during his studies at the Academy of Fine Arts in Prague.

In 1975, he was accepted to the Academy of Fine Arts in Prague, where in the mid-1970s, conditions were severely affected by normalization. After two years of studying sculpture (preparatory course with Karel Kolumek, sculpture studio of Jiří Bradáček) Jiří Kačer decided to transfer to the studio of stone sculpture restoration and sculpture reproduction under Prof. Antonín Nykl in 1977. This allowed him to escape the tedious modeling lessons for various anniversaries in the style of socialist realism. The stifling conditions at the school provided little incentive for free creativity, and it was important for students to interact outside of school and engage with the entire unofficial art scene, visiting studios and private exhibitions.

He completed his studies in 1981 with a diploma thesis - a copy of the statue of Mary Magdalene from the Calvary sculpture in Pohořelec. From 1990 to 1994, he worked at the Academy of Fine Arts as an assistant to Prof. Jan Hendrych. He was a member of the Council of the Association of Restorers (1990–2020, in liquidation).

From 1981 to 1989, he organized summer sculpture meetings in the marlstone quarry in Přední Kopanina and after 1990 he was instrumental in reviving International sculpture symposia in Hořice. As a curator, he organized an art symposium in Mikulov. Since 1992, he has been a regular participant in sculpture symposia at home and abroad. In 1987, 1989, and 1991, he participated in the Salon de Tokyo exhibitions, and in 2010, he participated in the SmaltArt symposium in Ostrava-Vítkovice. Jiří Kačer created several copies of Baroque sculptures by important artists Antonín Braun, Ferdinand Maxmilián Brokoff), which replaced damaged originals, and restored other sculptures.

Jiří Kačer lives and works in Prague and Hostivice. From 2004, he is a member of Umělecká beseda.

== Work ==
As a student at the stonemasonry school in Hořice, Jiří Kačer collaborated on sculptures by Jan Hendrych. The Hořice school also maintained a strong Wagnerian tradition in working with the natural shape of stone. Wagner graduated from the stonemasonry school in Hořice and, after studying with Jan Štursa and Otakar Španiel at the Academy of Fine Arts in Prague and Otto Gutfreund at the School of Applied Arts in Prague, he returned to Hořice. He was one of the leading restorers of stone sculptures by Matyáš Bernard Braun in Kuks. Jan Hendrych, who studied under Wagner, was in fact his only teacher and mentor and had a significant influence on Kačer at the beginning of his sculptural career.

At the Academy of Fine Arts in Prague, he initially focused on figurative art and sought inspiration in the works of representatives of modern European sculpture (Manzù, Marini, Greco), but also in unofficial exhibitions of former graduates of the Academy of Fine Arts and the Academy of Arts, Architecture and Design. His early work was influenced by the 1973 exhibition of sculptures by Giacomo Manzù at the Belvedere in Prague and, for a time, also by the pop artist George Segal with his use of plaster casts of girls' bodies (Marcela, 1980–81).

After graduating, Kačer returned from plaster casts (Back, 1982, Imprint, 1982) to working in stone and organized sculpture meetings in Přední Kopanina marl quarry. His relief "imprints" in stone (Back, 1983, marlstone) were initially still figurative (Pieta, 1985, sandstone), but soon became abstract traces of human presence (Imprint, marlstone, 1985, sandstone, 1997). The horizontally hatched stylized relief torsos suppress the relationship to immediate reality and became a turning point towards non-figurative stones with a graphic structure, which are close to fragments of historical architecture, including the point of decay. Kačer's relief sculptures gradually transcended the traditional form of this genre into the realm of objects and installations, confronting the basic elements of his work with current trends. In 1987–1989, he also devoted himself to medal making.

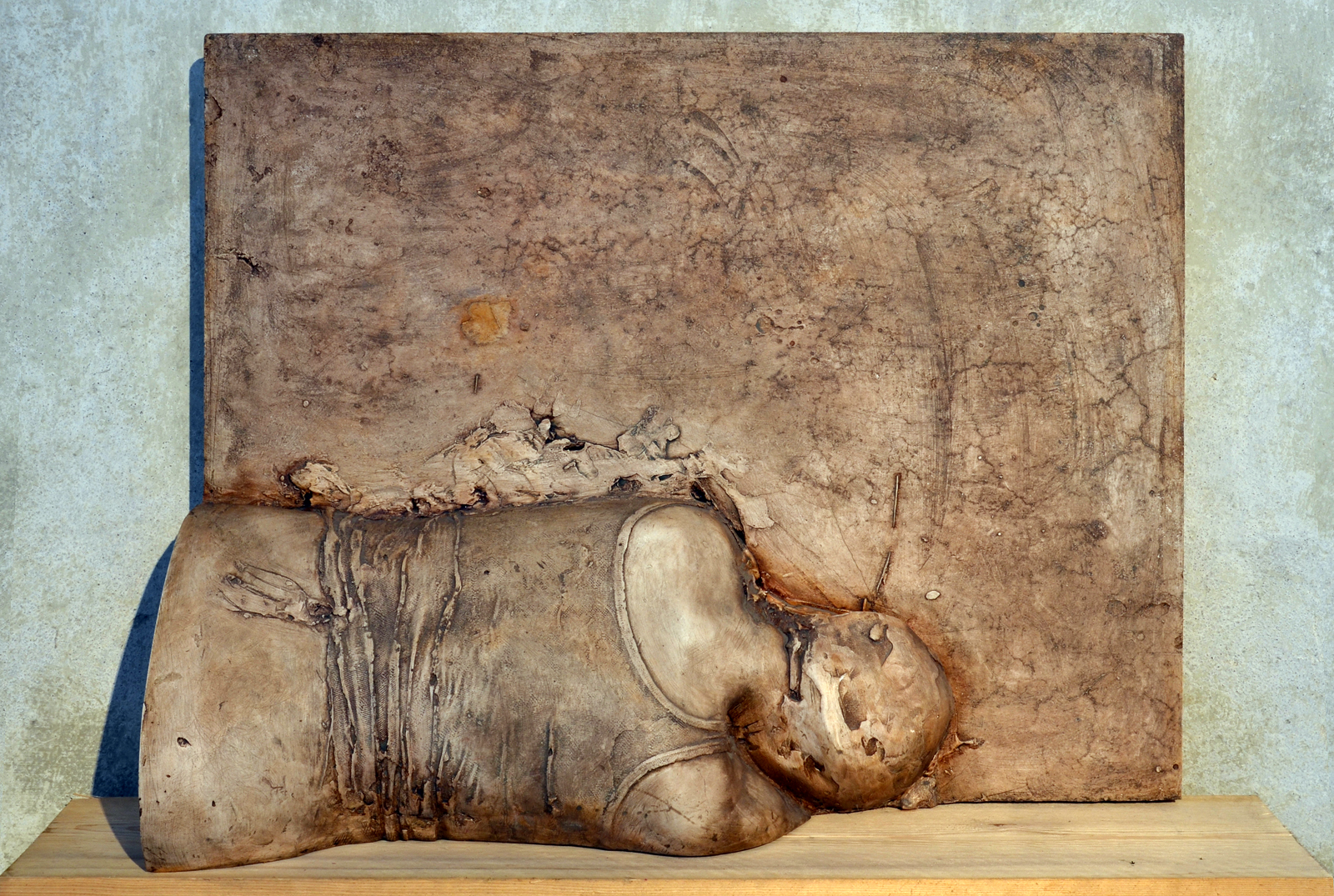
Back, patinated plaster, 1982

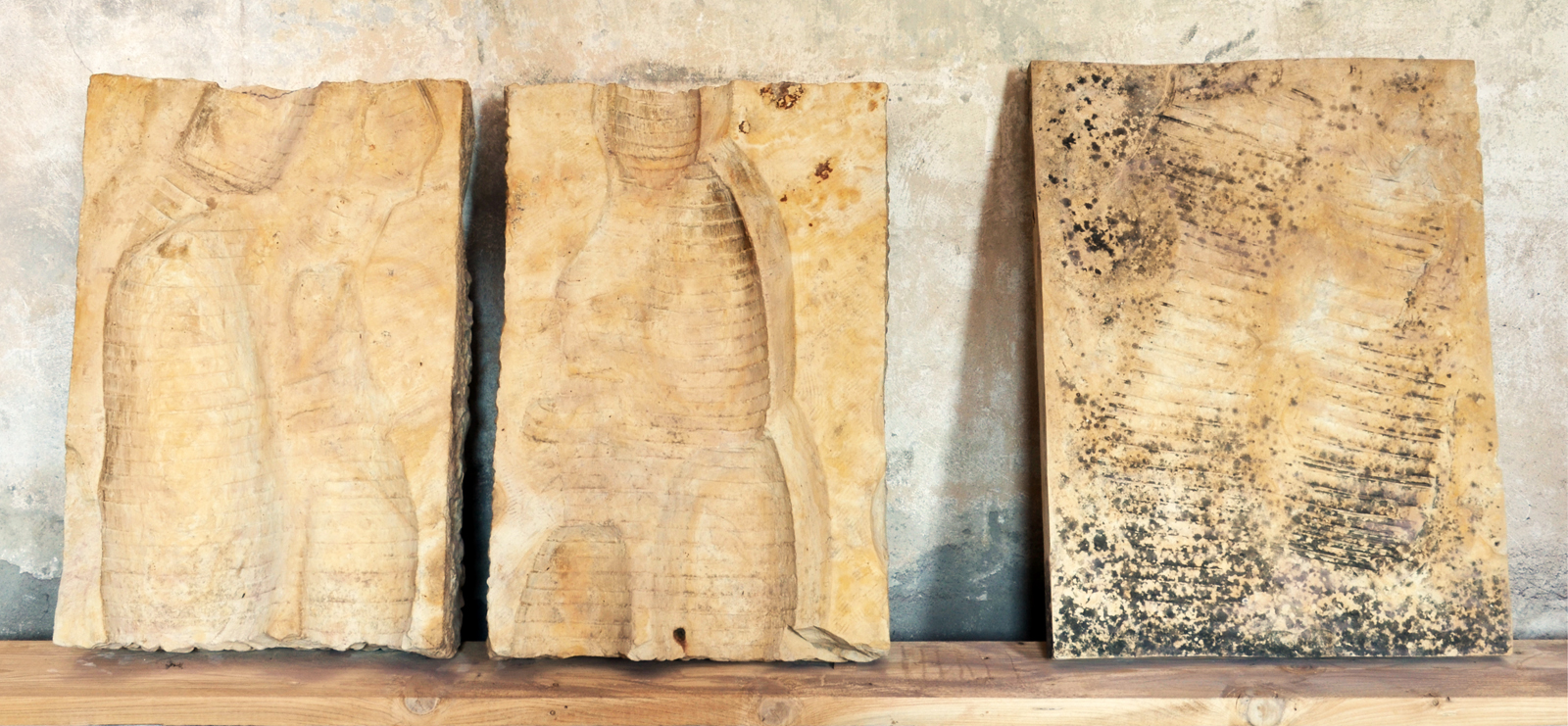
Back, marlstone, 1983

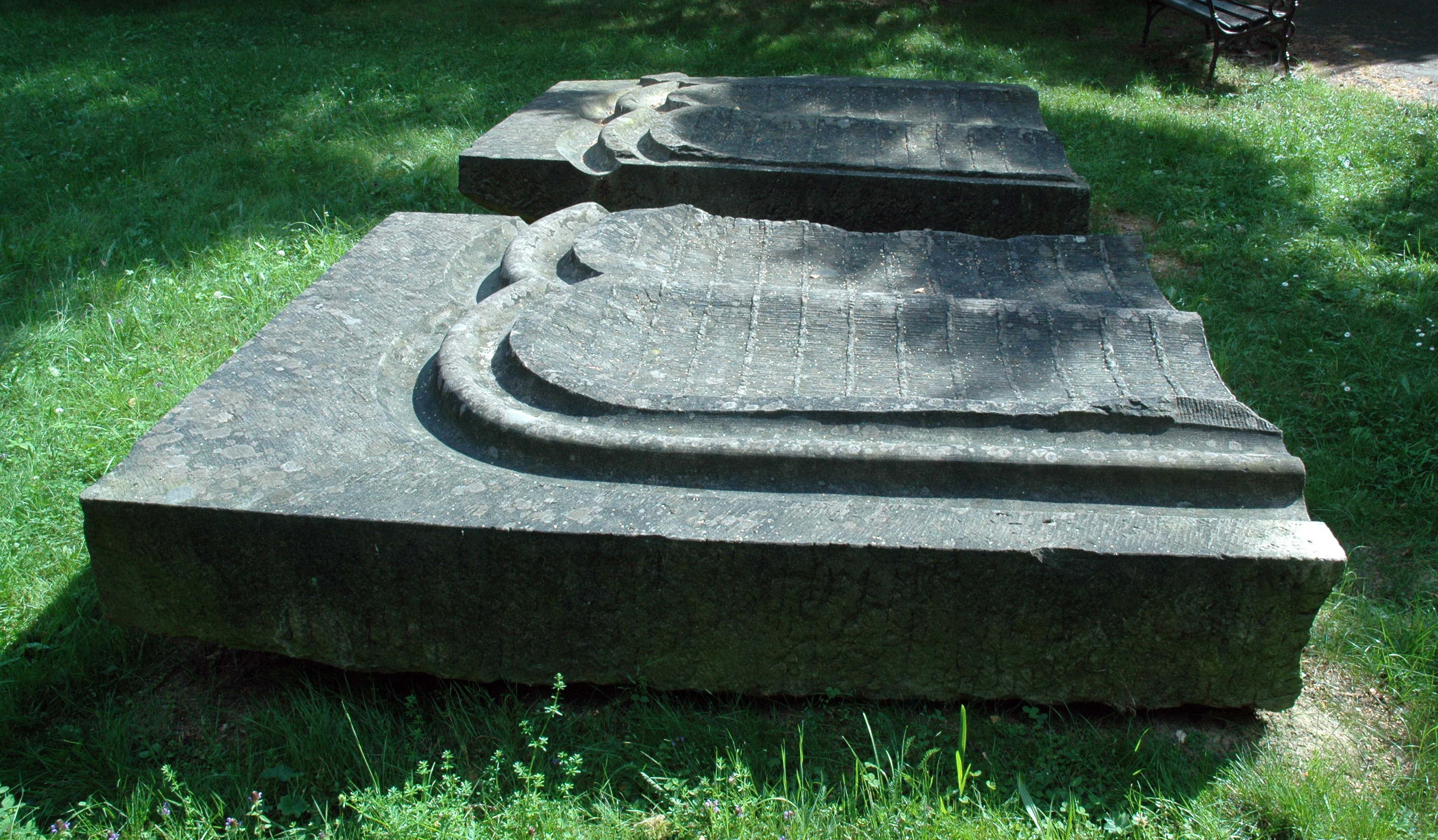
Two fragments (imprints), sandstone, Hořice, 1993

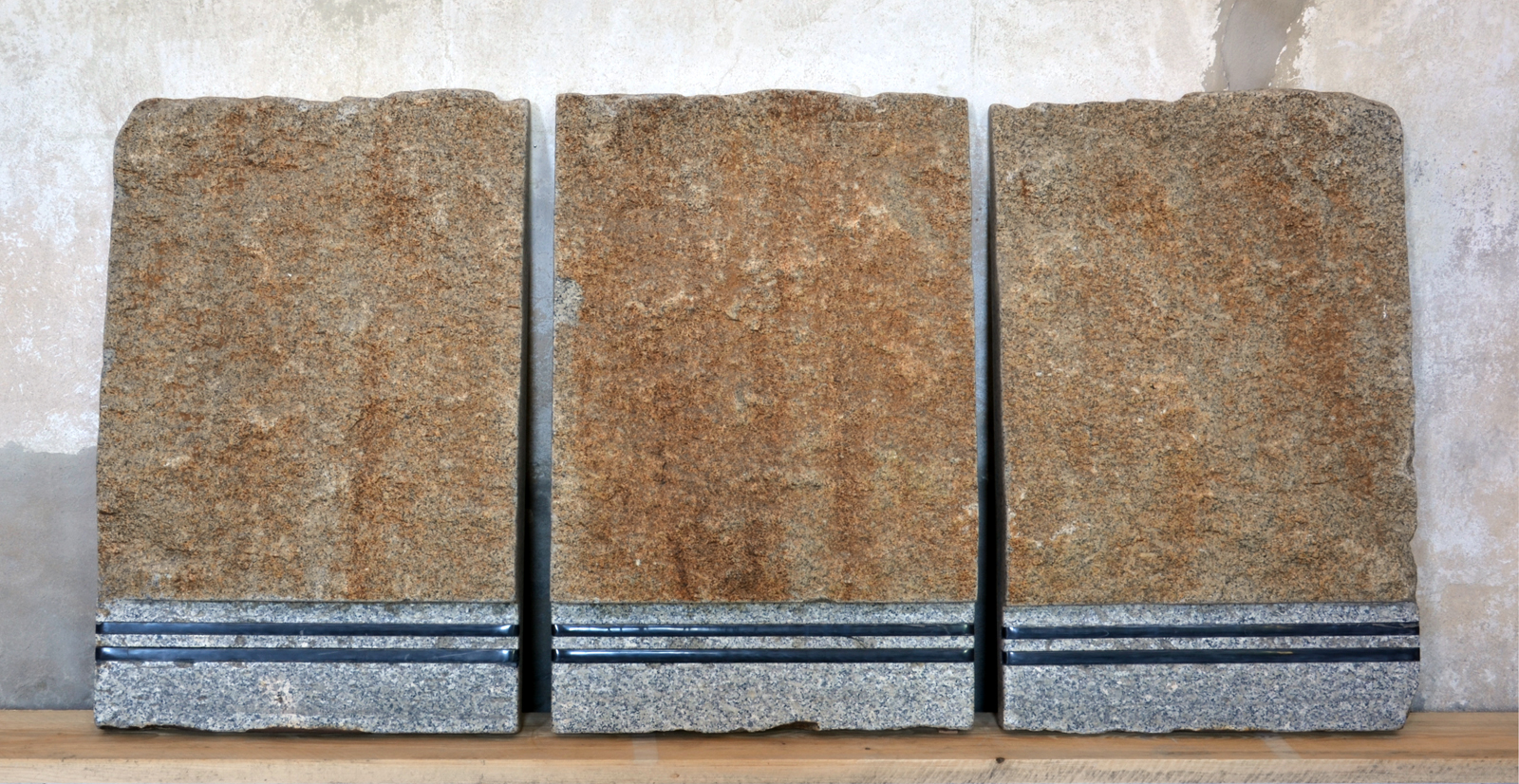
Triptych, granite, Turkish marble, 1993

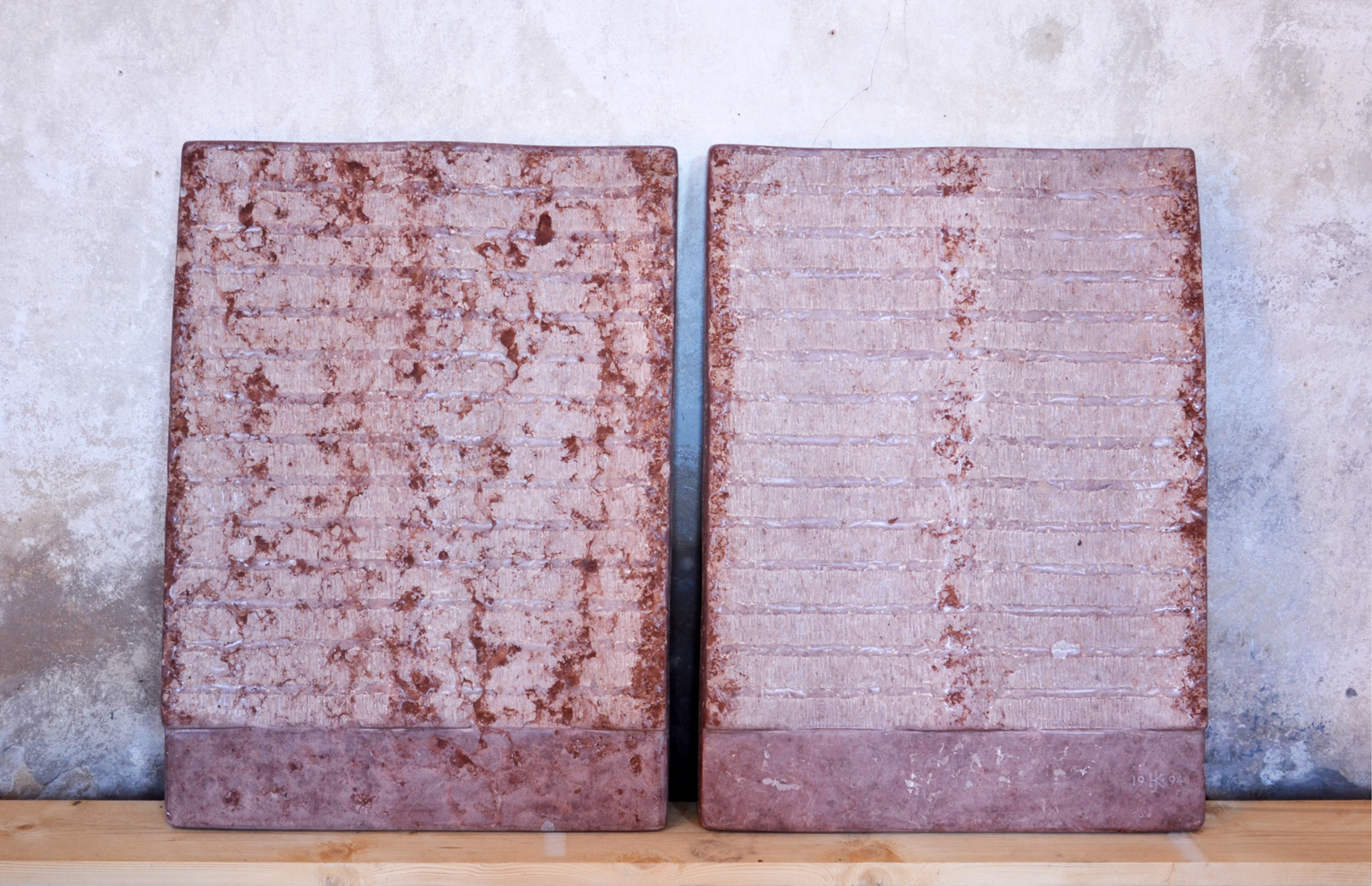
Diptych, Adnet limestone, 1994

Kačer treats stone as organic material, directly and indirectly following in the footsteps of Karl Prantl. His work in the 1990s finds itself at the intersection of natural objects and artifacts. The sculptures respect the natural shape and sometimes only emphasize it with geometric lines (Fragment, syenite, 1998). Most of them do not exceed the dimensions of a human figure, but stones erected as steles have the monumentality of a stone block (Fragment, granite, h. 460 cm, 2004, Hetzmannsdorf, Obelisk, sandstone, h. 500 cm, 2008, Kuks). Since 1985, he has called most of his works Fragments.

Fragments have multiple meanings in Kačer's work. On the one hand, they refer to a piece of stone as a smaller part of a rock that a person has taken to work on. Usually, the part where the stone was broken off is left in its natural shape (Fragment, Slivenec limestone, 2003). The worked stone itself is almost always something that has no beginning and no end; it is the middle part of a perfect abstract shape that can be extrapolated in both directions (Fragment, granite, 2001, Slivenec marble, 2006). The guessed-at prototype of the sculptures is evidence of the imaginative component of his work. The other, rationalistic component is manifested in cyclicality, rhythm, and the serial arrangement of elements, with an overlap into unexpected "spontaneous" permutation.

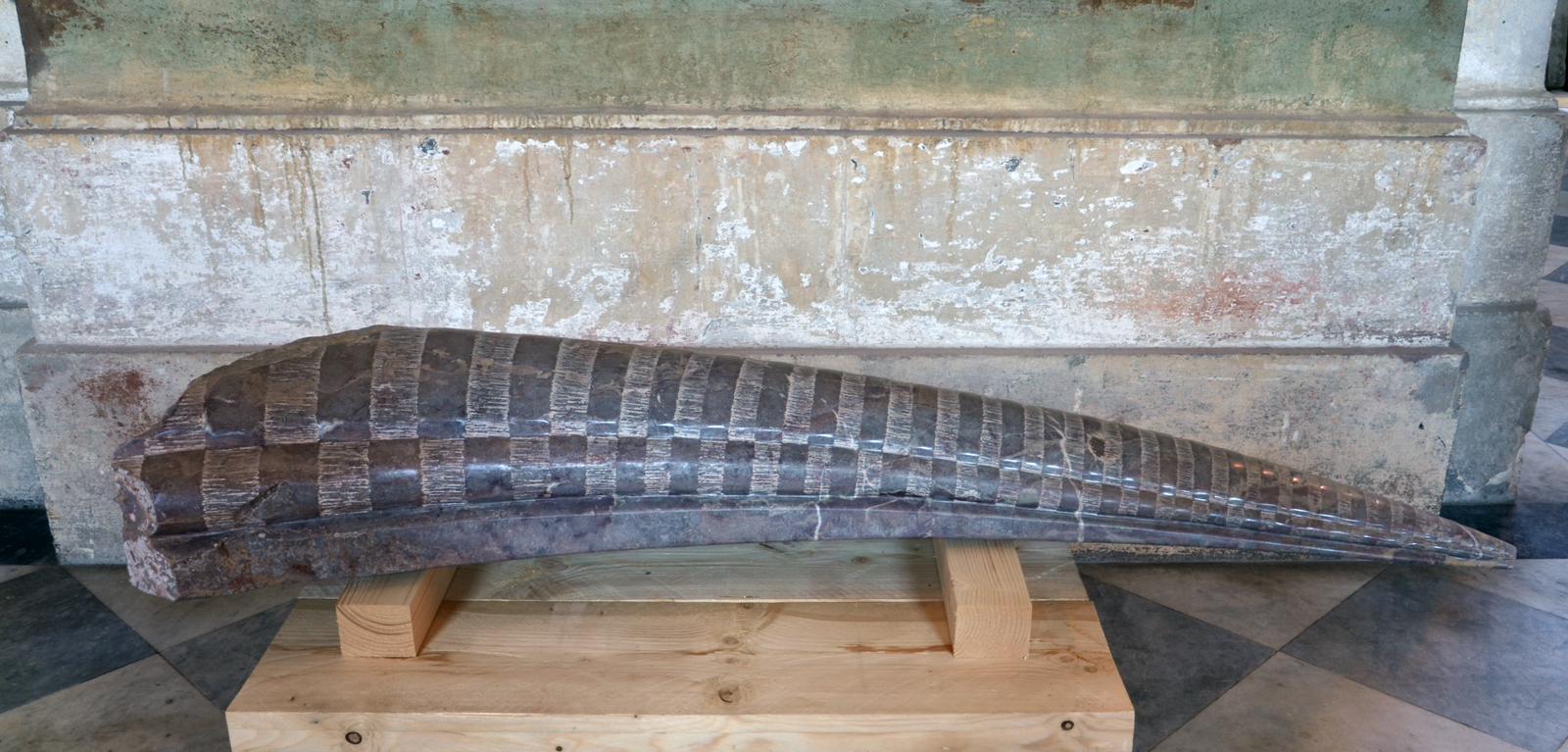
Fragment, Slivenec marble, 2001

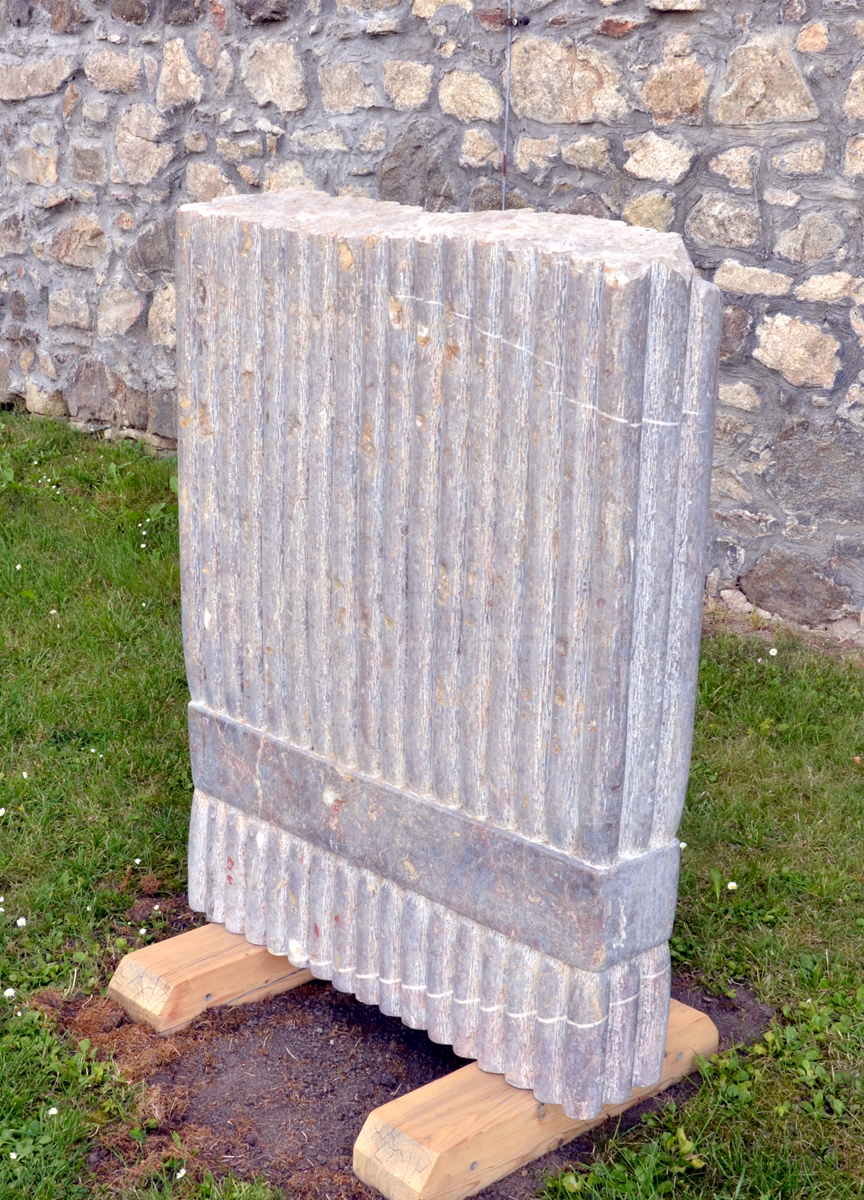
Stele, limestone, 2001

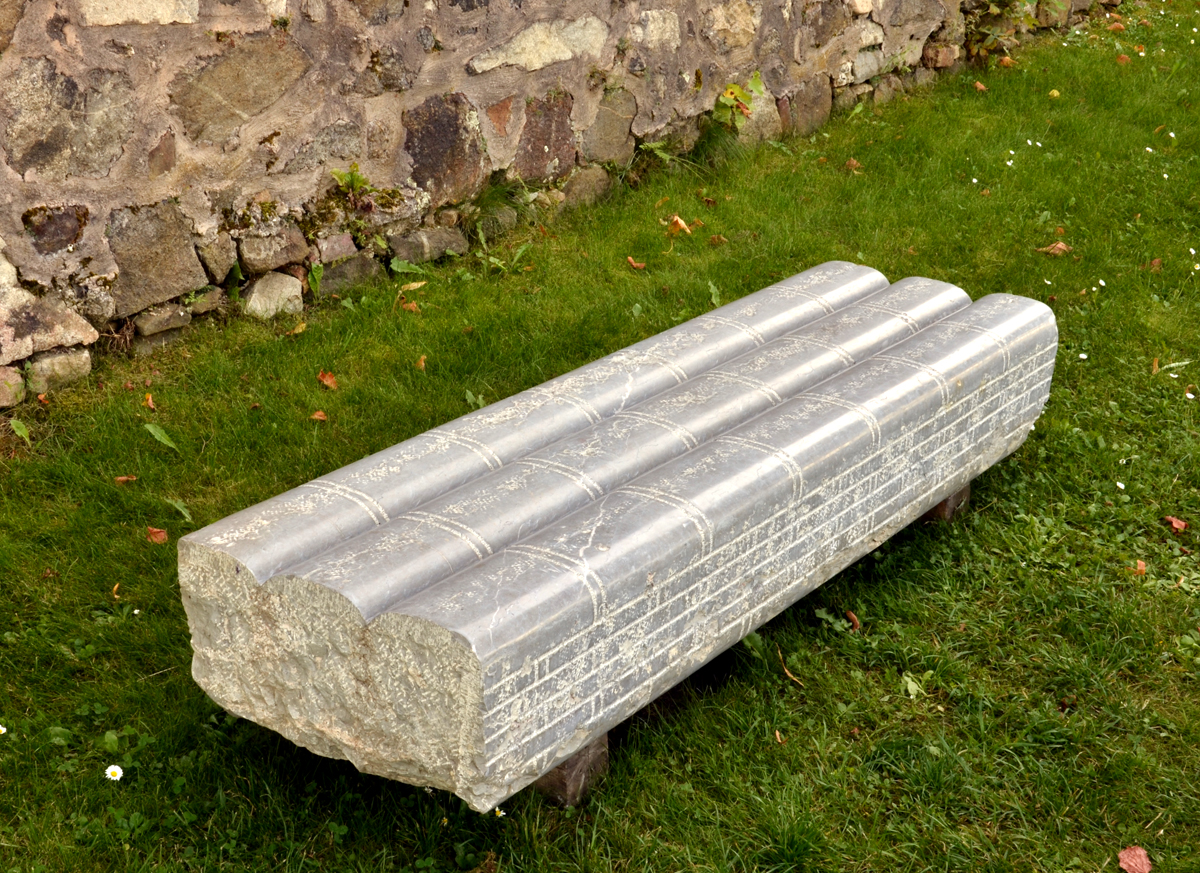
Fragment, limestone, 2001

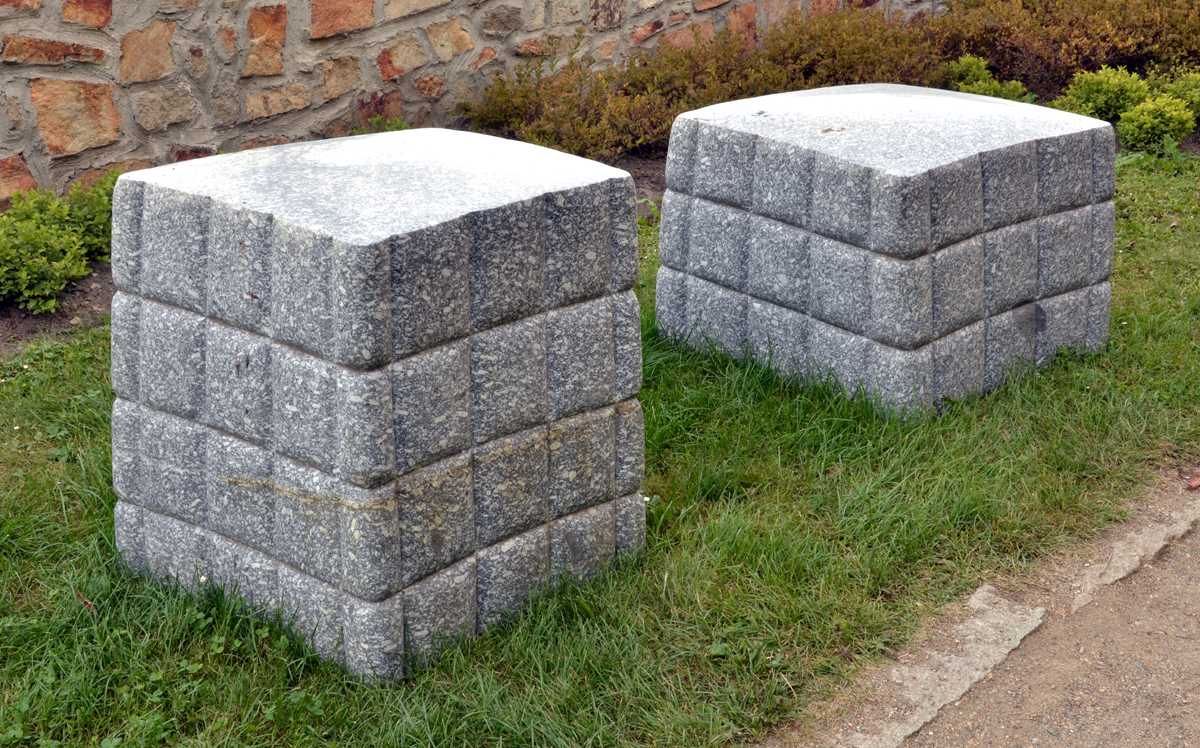
Blocks, granite, 2005

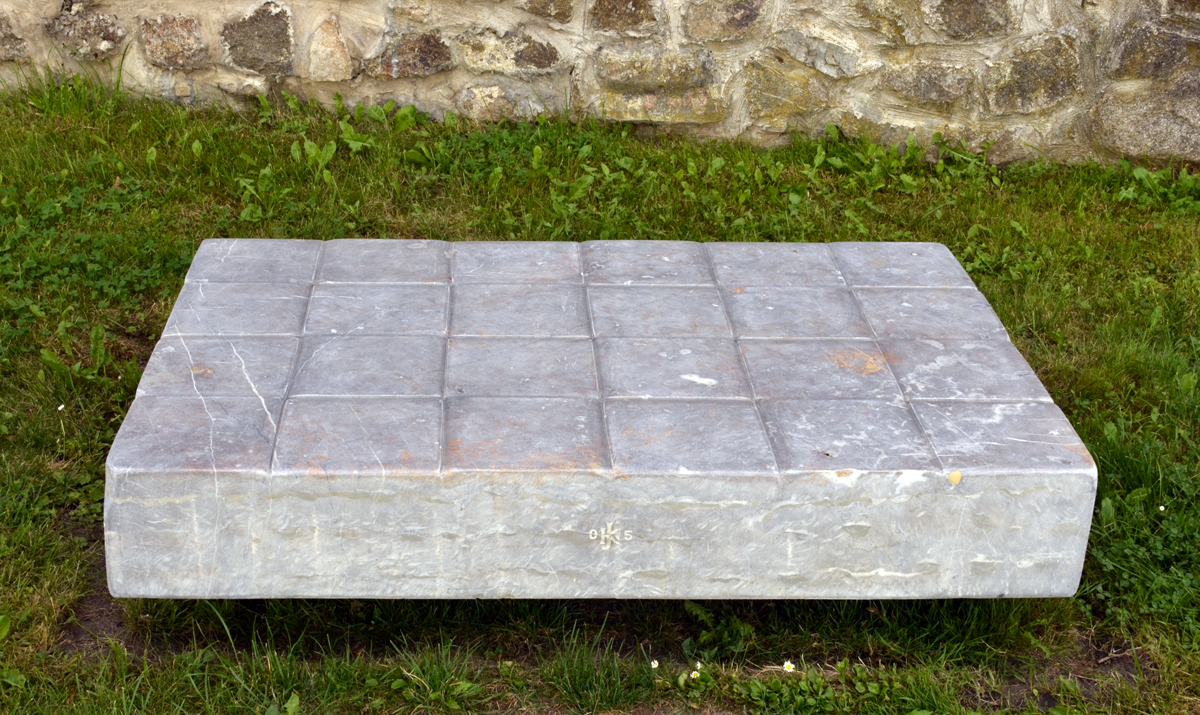
Fragment, limestone, 2005

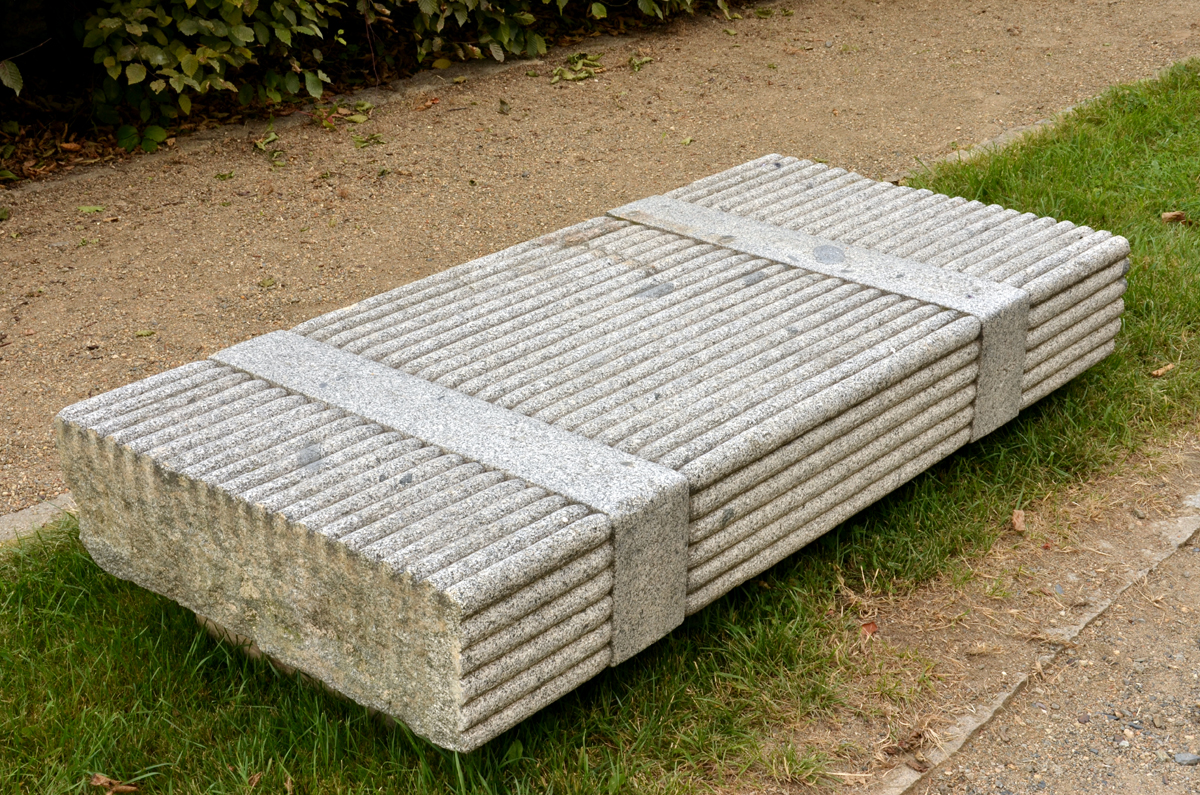
Fragment, granite, 2005

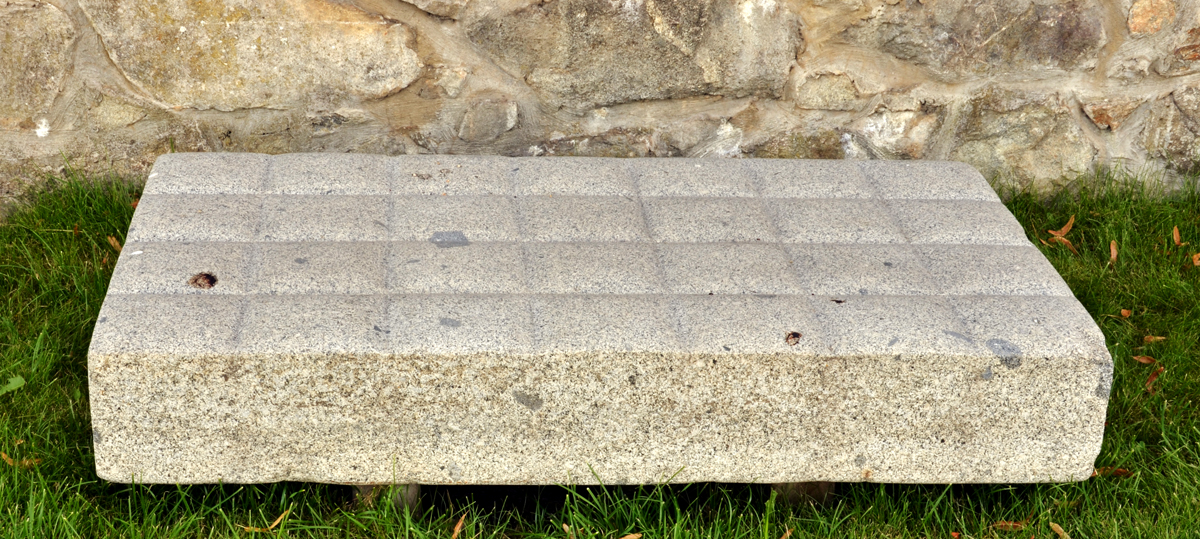
Fragment, granite, 2006

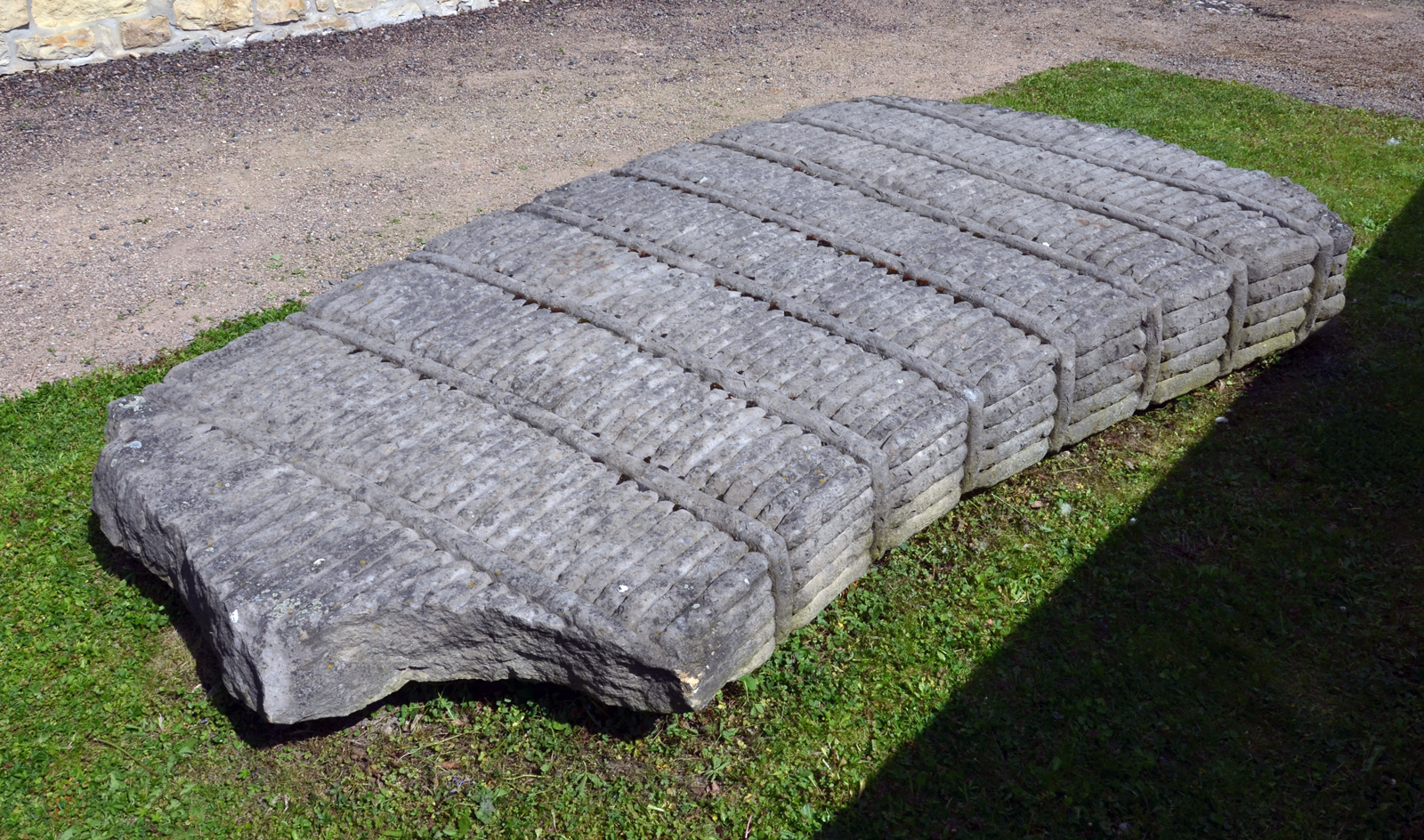
Fragment, sandstone, 2006

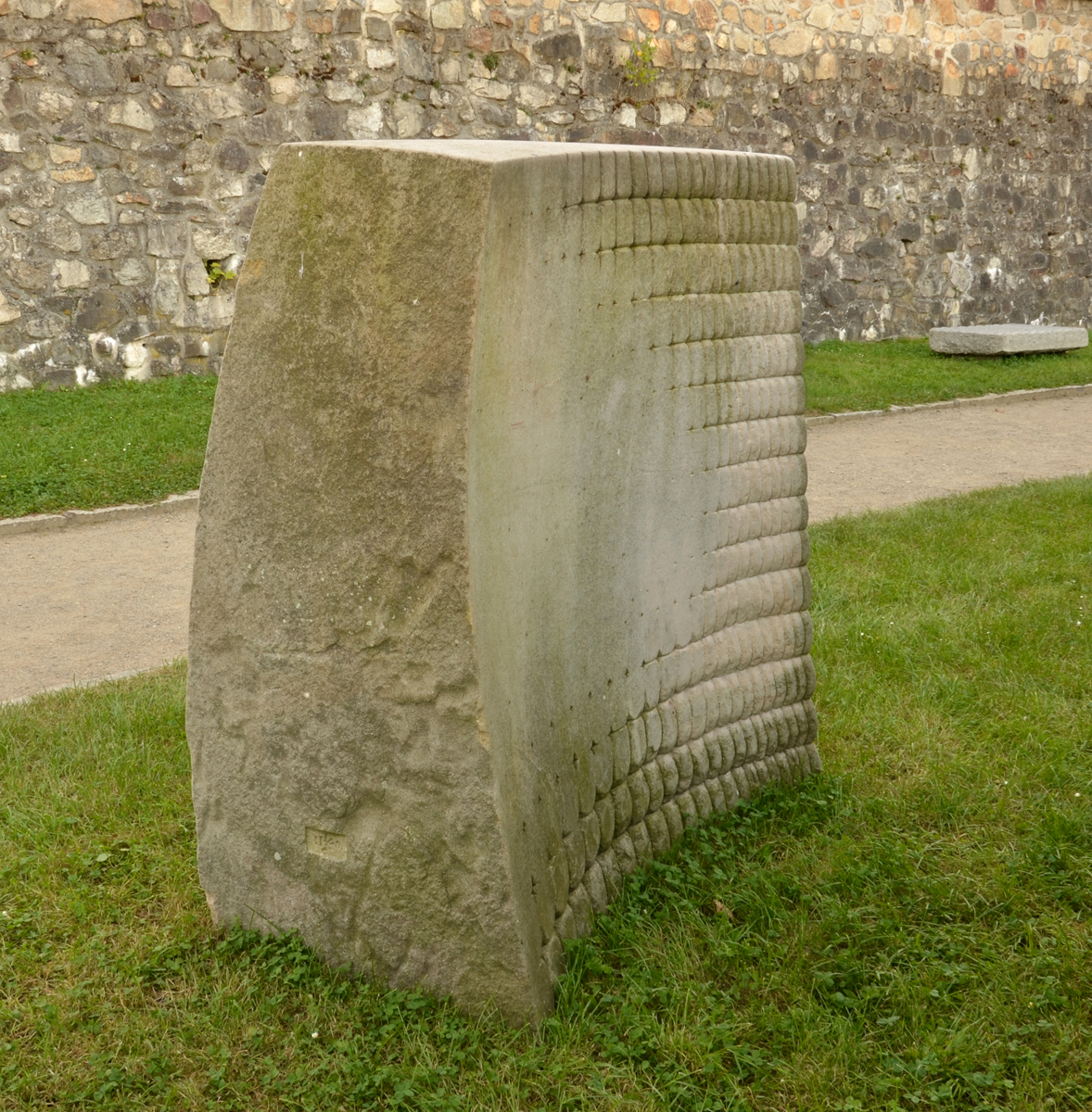
Fragment, sandstone, 2009

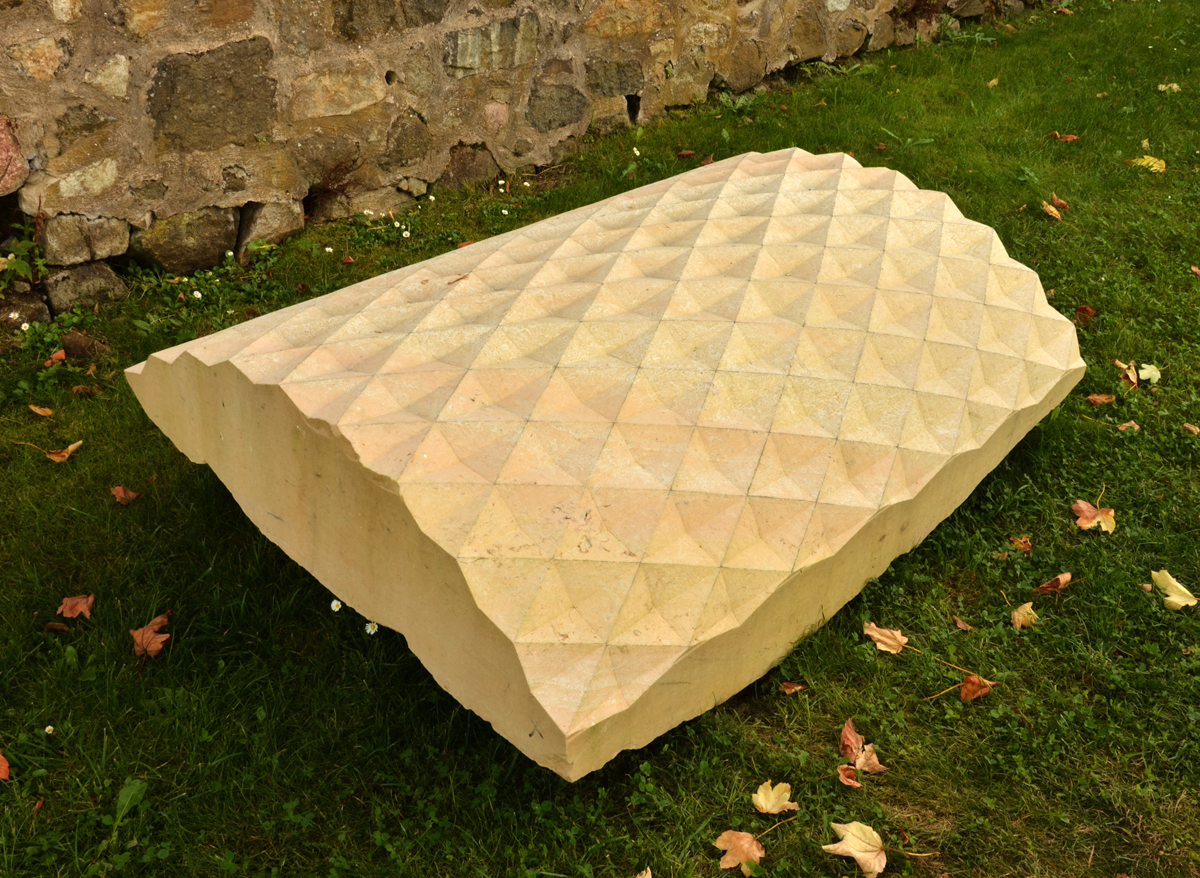
Fragment, sandstone, 2016

The fragment is crafted so that its natural shape blends into soft curves emphasized by longitudinal lines ("Fragment," limestone, 2011). Sometimes the sculptor creates the illusion of bulging or expanding matter using transverse bands ("Fragment," Slivenec limestone, 2001), sometimes spaced at regular intervals ("Fragment," serpentine, 1999, sandstone, 2001, 2006), to constrain and limit its shape. The relief grid of the surface resembles natural organic structures ("Fragment," sandstone, 1995, serpentine, 2001) or, as a regular geometric order, evokes the austerity of architecture ("Fragment (bench)," Slivenec limestone, 2006).

A characteristic feature of the sculptor's work is the careful treatment of the surface, which respects the natural color and structure of the stone and enhances its effect. Kačer does not attempt to "liberate the sculpture hidden inside the stone" (if his Cores cannot be considered such a procedure), but in his sculptural work he responds to the type of material and its shape, brittleness, or pattern (Triptych, granite, marble, 1993). He has thus arrived at a highly personal sculptural expression that does not dazzle with drama and grandeur of form, but speaks through the delicate oscillation of surface modulation that respects the inherent nature and demands of stone. In contrast to older sculptures placed on pedestals, Kačer's sculptures do not fulfill a function related to architecture or a specific environment. He has freed them from these direct connections; his sculptures are within reach, mostly freely placed, allowing direct touch and exploration of the surface.

Thanks to his regular participation in sculpture symposia, he has the opportunity to work with different types of stone and creates his works with respect for the material so as to subtly highlight its specific qualities. Therefore, he sometimes leaves traces of tools to highlight the rough structure (Fragment, granite, 2006), while at other times he polishes the surface to emphasize the pattern in the stone (Blocks, granite, 2006). In 2008, he exhibited stone cores from geological boreholes, which he individualized with restrained interventions of sculpting tools into the surface of the stone.

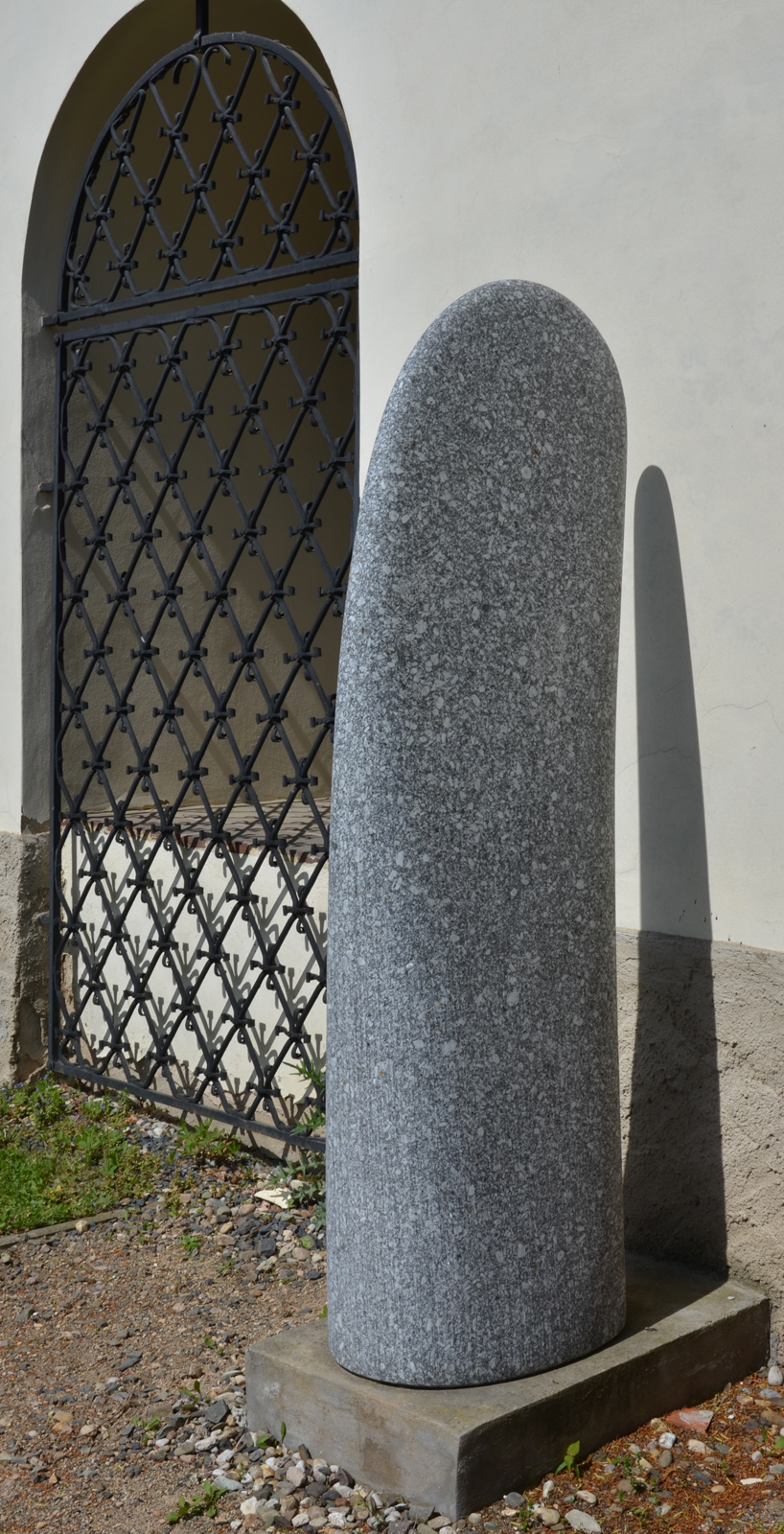
Stele, granite, 2008

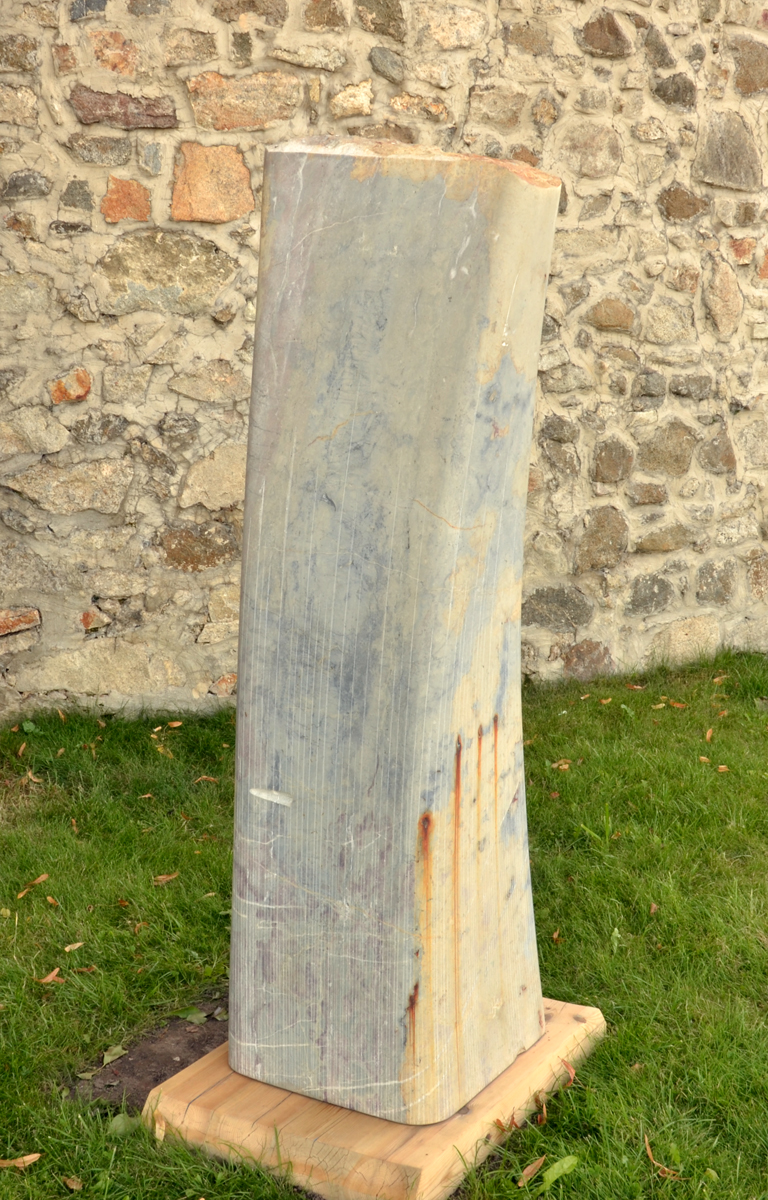
Stele, limestone, 2012

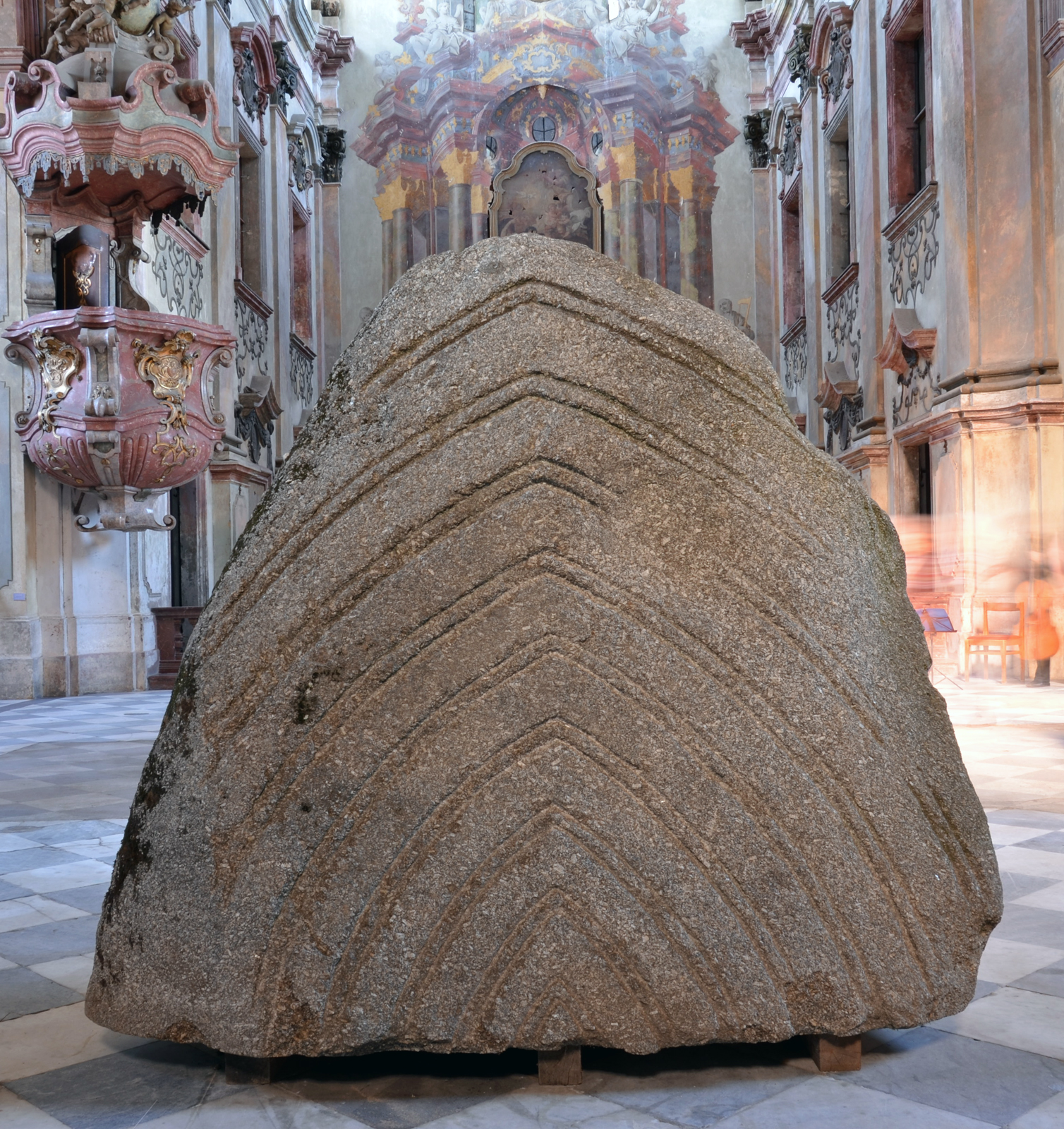
Fragment (Portal), granite, 2012

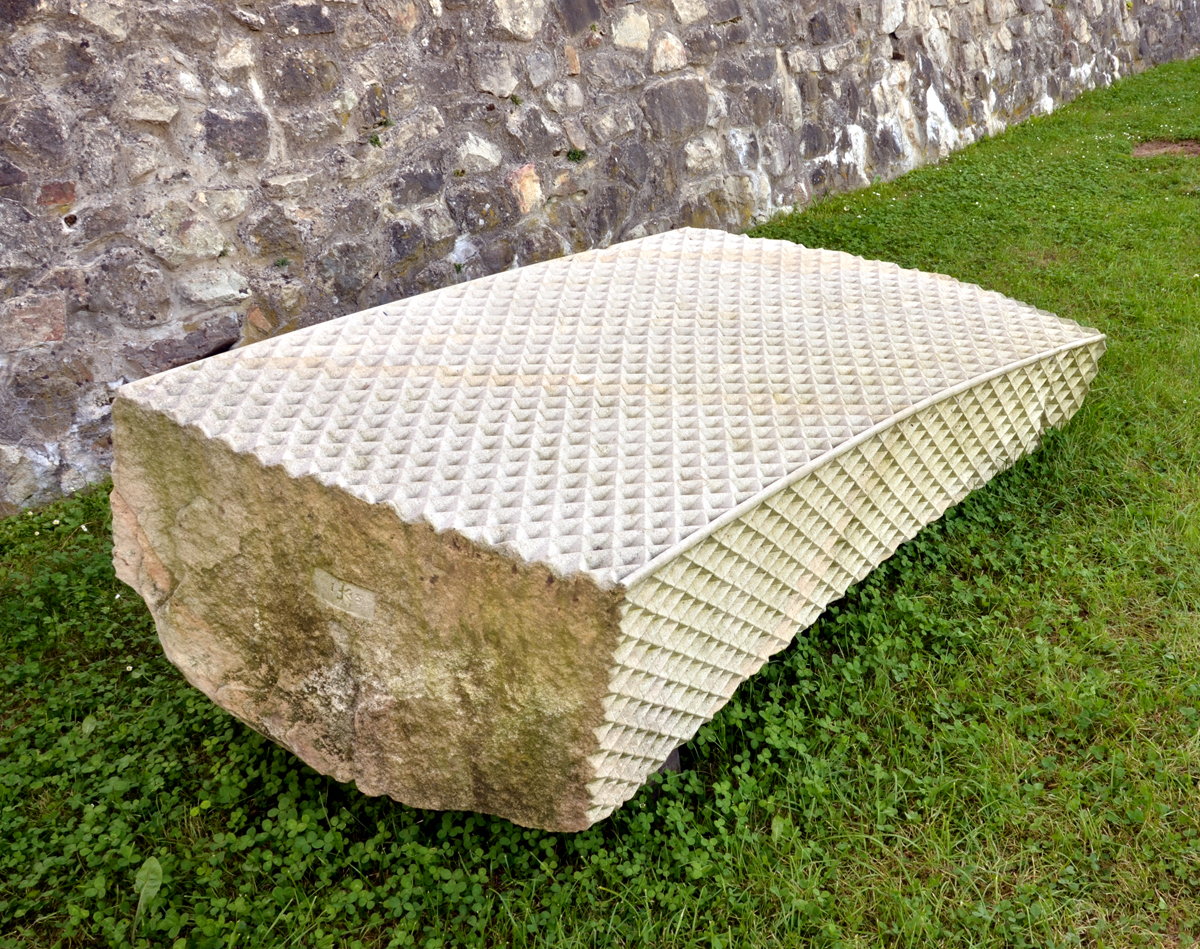
Fragment, sandstone, 2015

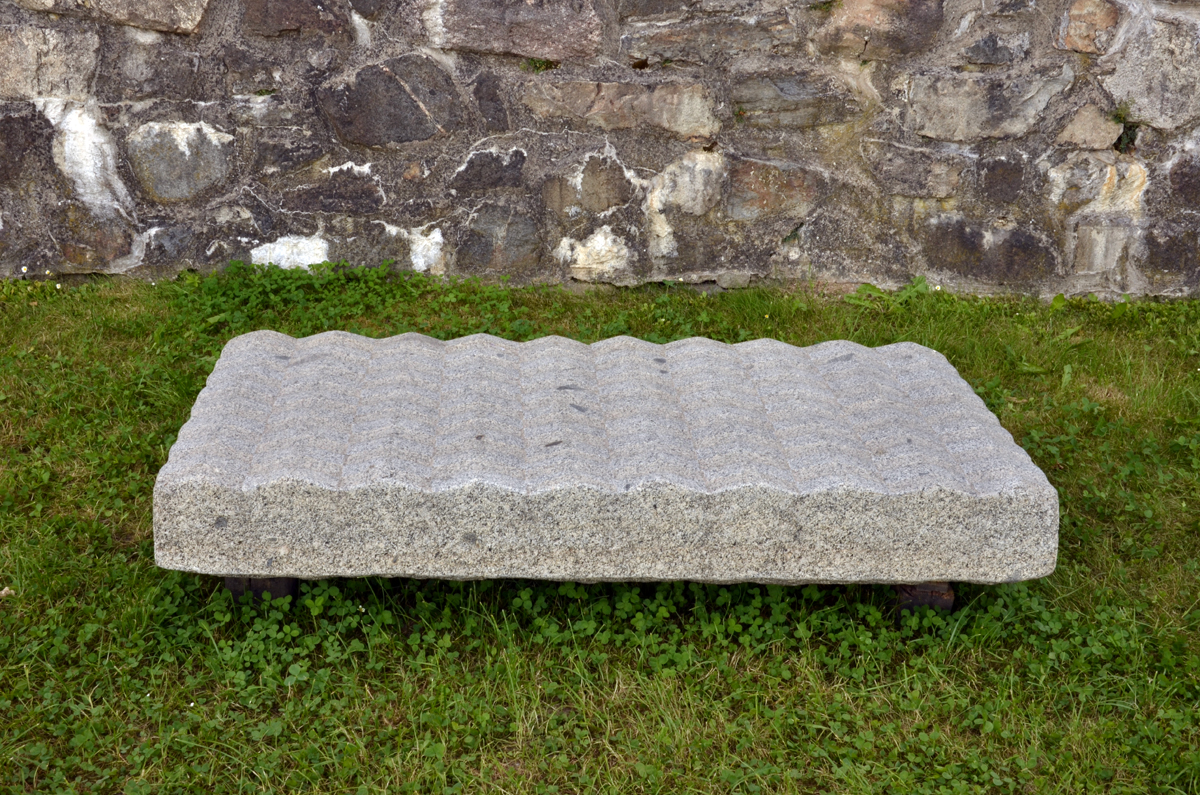
Fragment, granite, 2016

Kačer's fascination with surface structures is also evident in his monochrome large-scale enamels with low relief, created at the Smalt Art symposium in Vítkovice. He later used them as a base for his frottages, which he exhibited in 2012 at the New Hall in Prague.

=== Representation in collections ===
- National Gallery Prague
- North Bohemian Gallery of Fine Arts in Litoměřice
- Gallery of Modern Art in Hradec Králové
- Rabas Gallery Rakovník
- Ministry of Culture of the Czech Republic
- Salon de Tokyo Gallery, Japan
- Private collections at home and abroad

=== Public space installations ===
- Otisky (Imprints), sandstone, 1993, Hořice
- Fragment, granite, 1994, Milevsko
- Otisk (Imprint), sandstone, 1997, 260 cm, Kolín
- Nutcracker, syenite, 1998, Ondřejov
- Fragment, syenite, 1998, Jindřichův Hradec
- Drinking Fountain, granite, 2002 (120 cm), Mladá Boleslav
- Fragment, granite, 2003 (450 cm), Podvinný mlýn, Prague
- Monolith, granite, 2004 (460 cm), Hetzmannsdorf
- Fragment, sandstone, 2005 (350 cm), Uherský Brod
- Obelisk, sandstone, 2008, (500 cm), Kuks
- Fragment, sandstone, 2008, (360 cm), Vernéřovice
- Fragment, granite, 2010, Selb, Germany
- Sculpture for Cheb, 2013, Cheb
- Bench, granite, 2019, (400 cm), Mikulov
- Fragment, granite, 2019, Trojský zámek

=== Restoration and copies of sculptures ===
During the restoration, Jiří Kačer collaborated with technologists such as Jiří Rathouský. He verified the possibilities and limits of using ethyl silicates and in the 1980s carried out work in artificial marble and stucco in Předklášteří and at Prague Castle. He participated in the restoration of the statues of the Holy Trinity Column on Malá Strana (1992–1997), the statue of St. John of Nepomuk on the Písek Stone Bridge (1996–1997, 2002–2003), the Plague Column in Znojmo (1999), the sculptures on the attic of the Tuscan Palace in Prague (1998), the Monument to Charles VI in Hlavenec (1999–2000), the war memorial in Komárov (2002), and the sculptural decoration of the staircase at Troja Castle.

He also restored sgraffito in Znojmo and at Jakub Krčín's fortress in Křepenice, marble stoups in the Church of the Virgin Mary in Sedlec (2007). In the castle park in Lysá nad Labem, he restored the allegorical statue of Spring, created copies of the statues of Apollo and Venus with Cupid (2006), and restored the vases on the enclosure wall (2008, 2009).

For Charles Bridge in Prague, he restored the sculpture group St. Ivo (Matyáš Bernard Braun) and made copies of the sculptures St. Ludmila with Little Wenceslaus (Antonín Braun) and in 2017 St. Francis Borgia (Ferdinand Maxmilián Brokoff).

In Prague, he also restored the statue of the Madonna by Matyáš Bernard Braun on the facade at Celetná 23 (2005) and St. Hubert with a deer by Ferdinand Maxmilián Brokoff at Tomášská st. 4 (2006, with Z. Kačerová), the monumental sculpture Work and Humanity by Jan Štursa on the bridgehead of Hlávka Bridge (2007–2008), and worked on the restoration of Matthias Gate at Prague Castle (2008, with V. Adamec and P. Gláser). He created a copy of the pedestal for the sculpture of Cosmas and Damian (2010) on Charles Bridge and participated in the repair of the figural part (2013). For the pilgrimage site at White Mountain in Prague, he restored the gate and reliefs (after 2010, with Z. Kačerová).

==== Significant works ====
- Statue of the Virgin Mary, Plague Column of the Holy Trinity, Malostranské náměstí in Prague (1994–1995)
- St. John of Nepomuk, Kostomlaty nad Labem
- Statue of St. Ivo (Matyáš Bernard Braun, 1711), Charles Bridge, Prague, restored in 1996, with Z. Fučík, P. Justa
- Plague Column in Znojmo (Michael Mandík ?,
- St. Ludmila with Little Wenceslas (Antonín Braun, 1720), Charles Bridge, Prague, copy by Jiří Kačer, Marcela Kačerová, 1999
- Sculptures of Apollo and Venus with Cupid, Lysá nad Labem (2006)
- Sculpture of St. Francis Borgia, Ferdinand Maxmilián Brokoff, copy by Jiří Kačer, Charles Bridge, Prague 2017
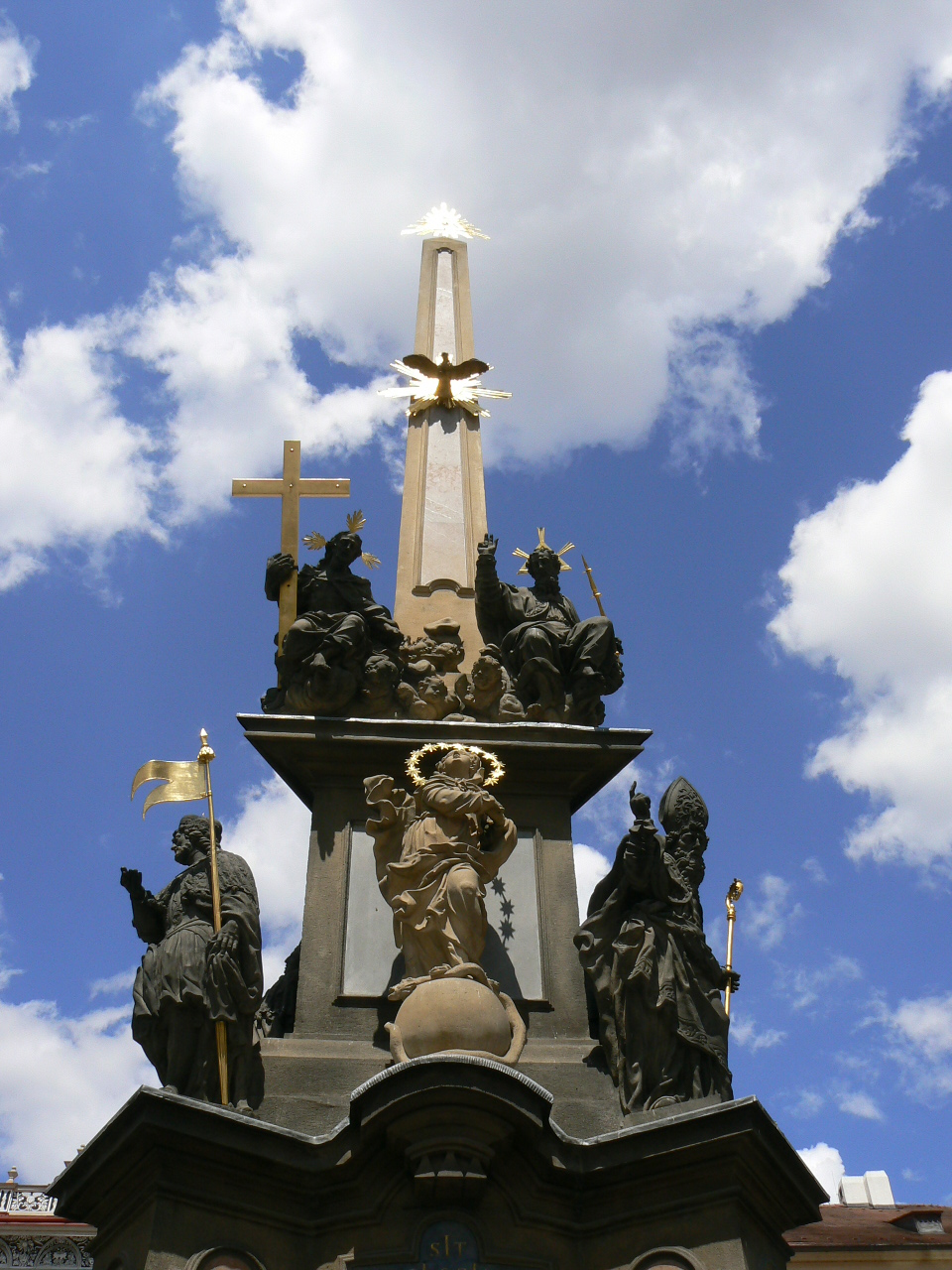
Virgin Mary, Holy Trinity Column, Malá Strana, copy by Jiří Kačer

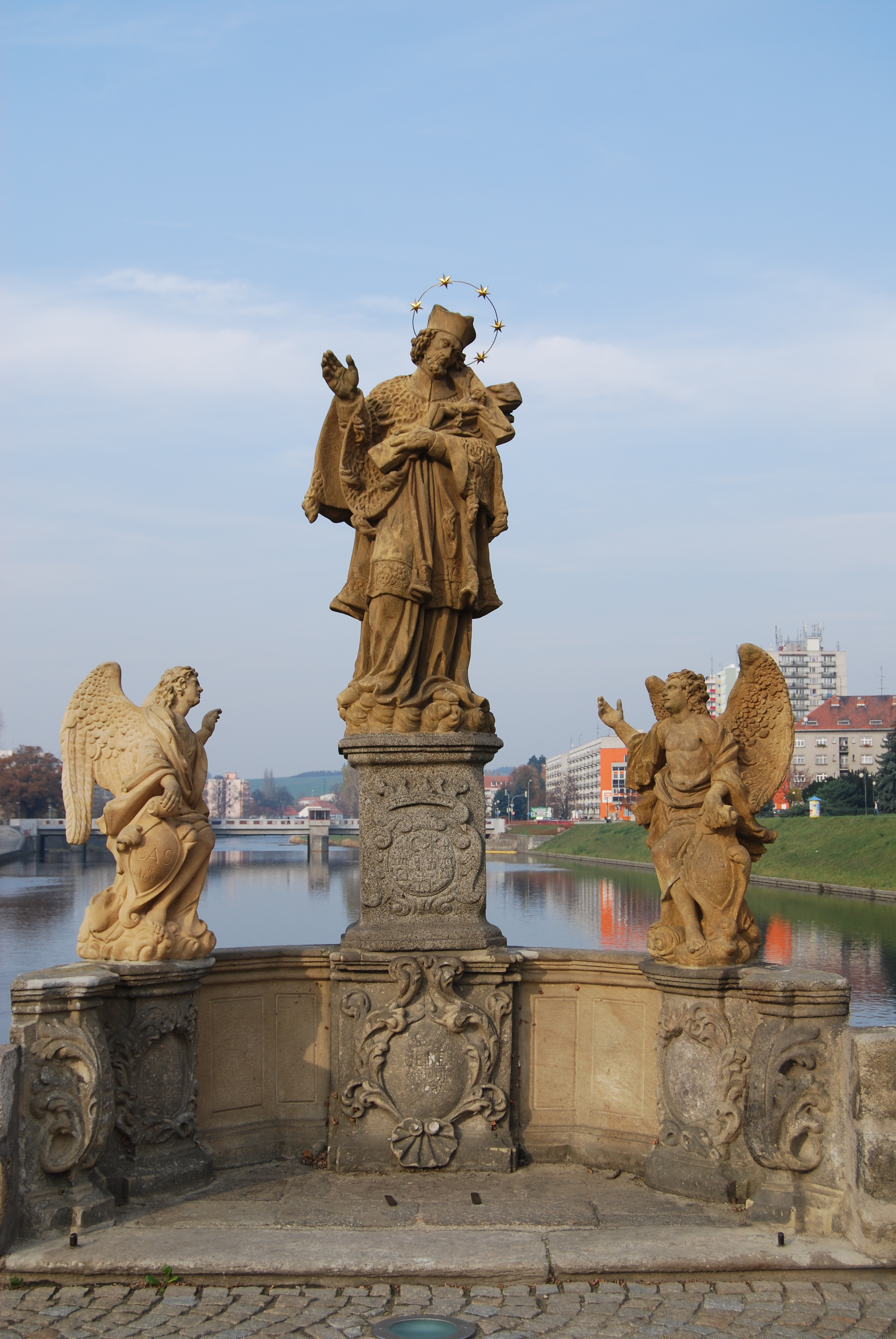
St. John of Nepomuk, Písek Stone Bridge, copy by Jiří Kačer

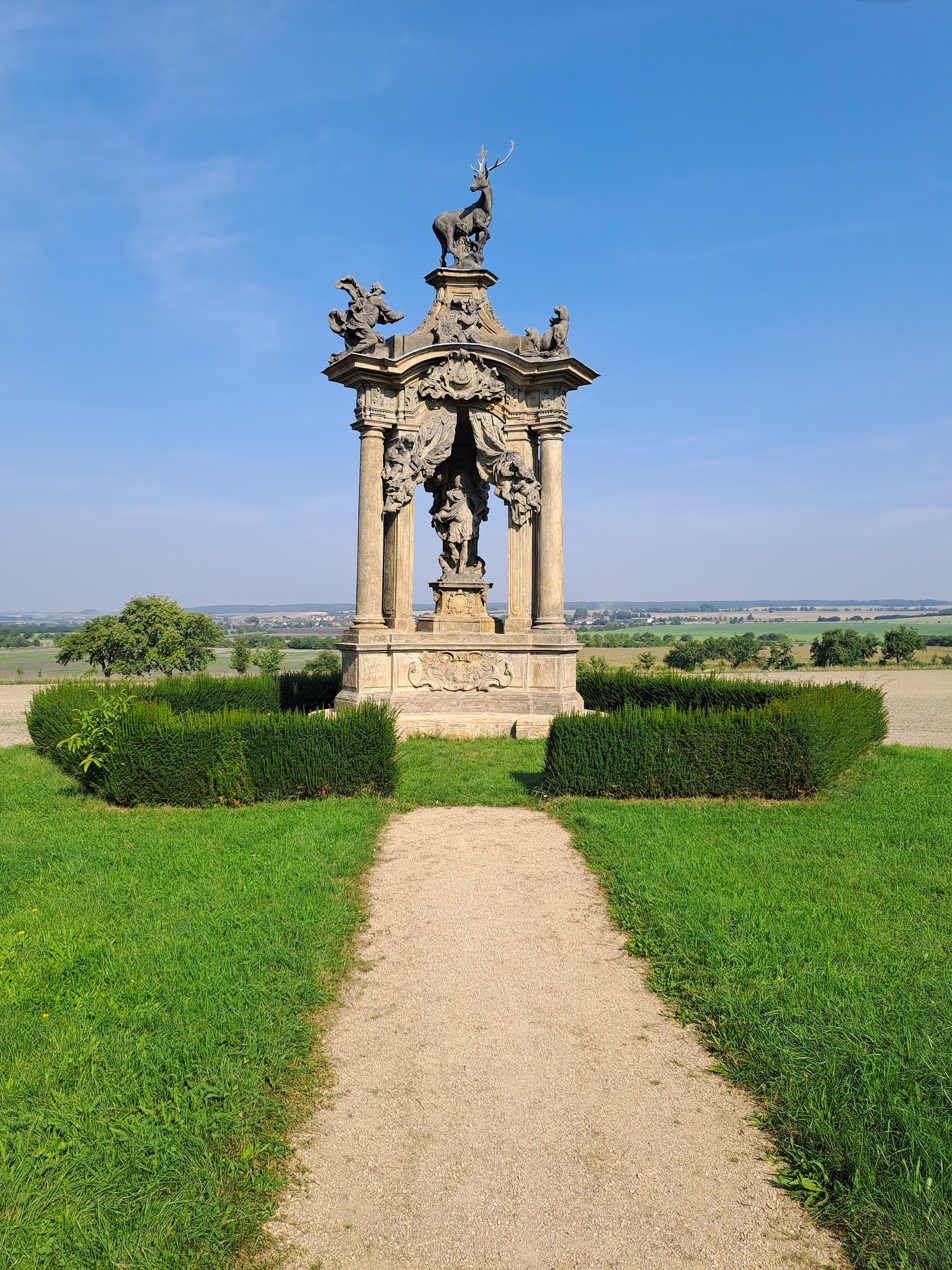
Monument to Emperor Charles VI in Hlavenec (2023)

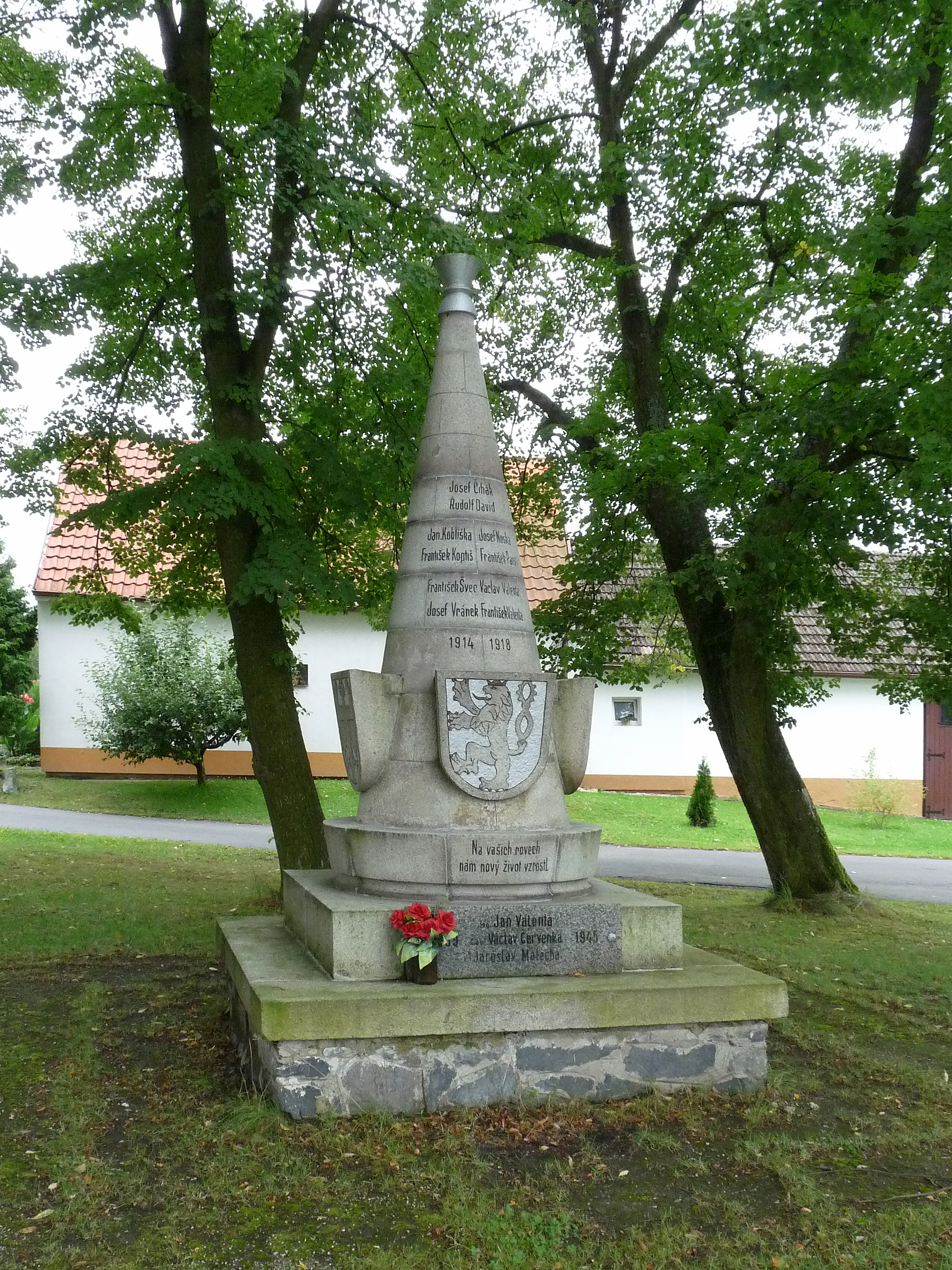
Monument to the Victims of World War I, Komárov

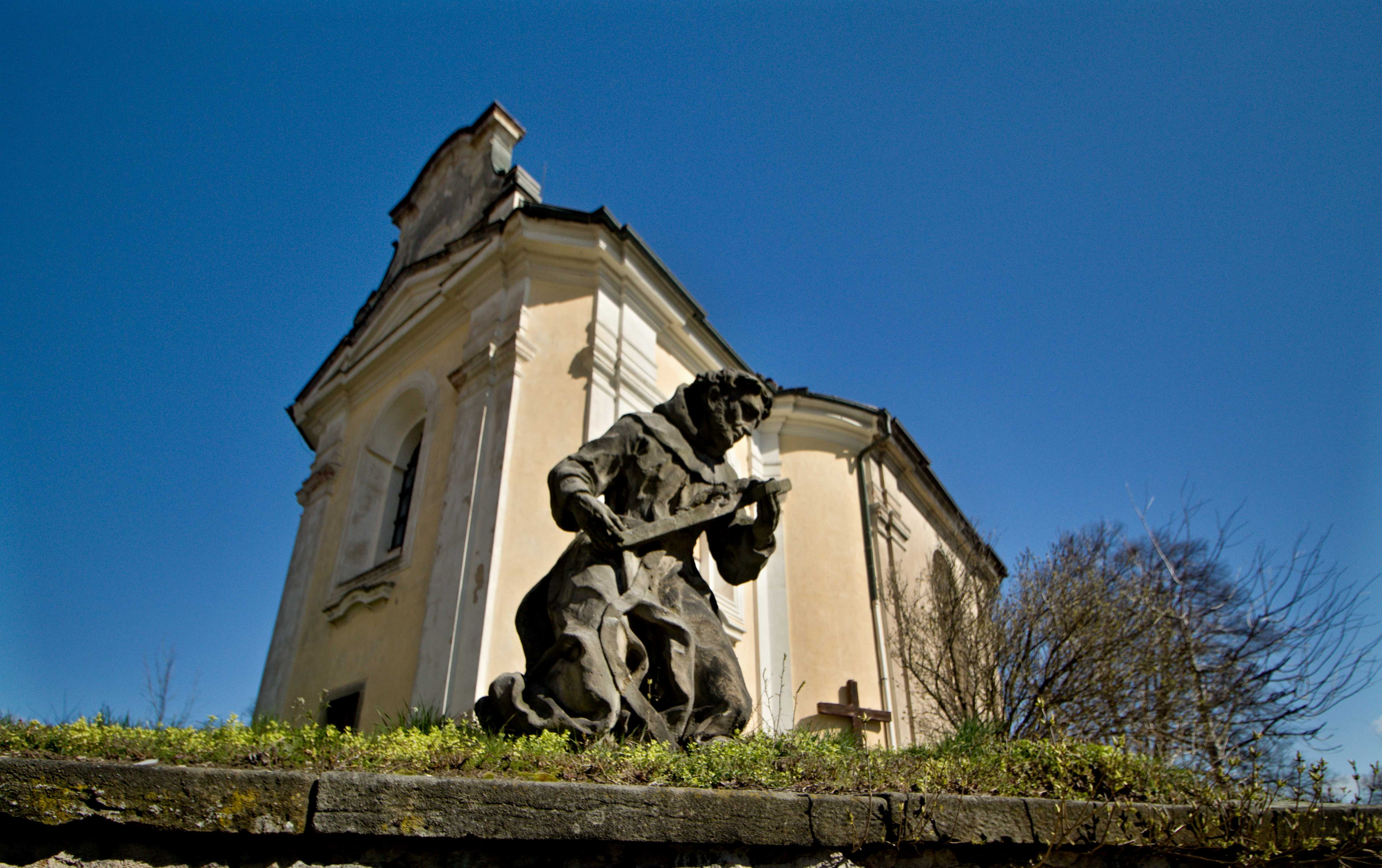
St. John of Nepomuk, Kostomlaty nad Labem

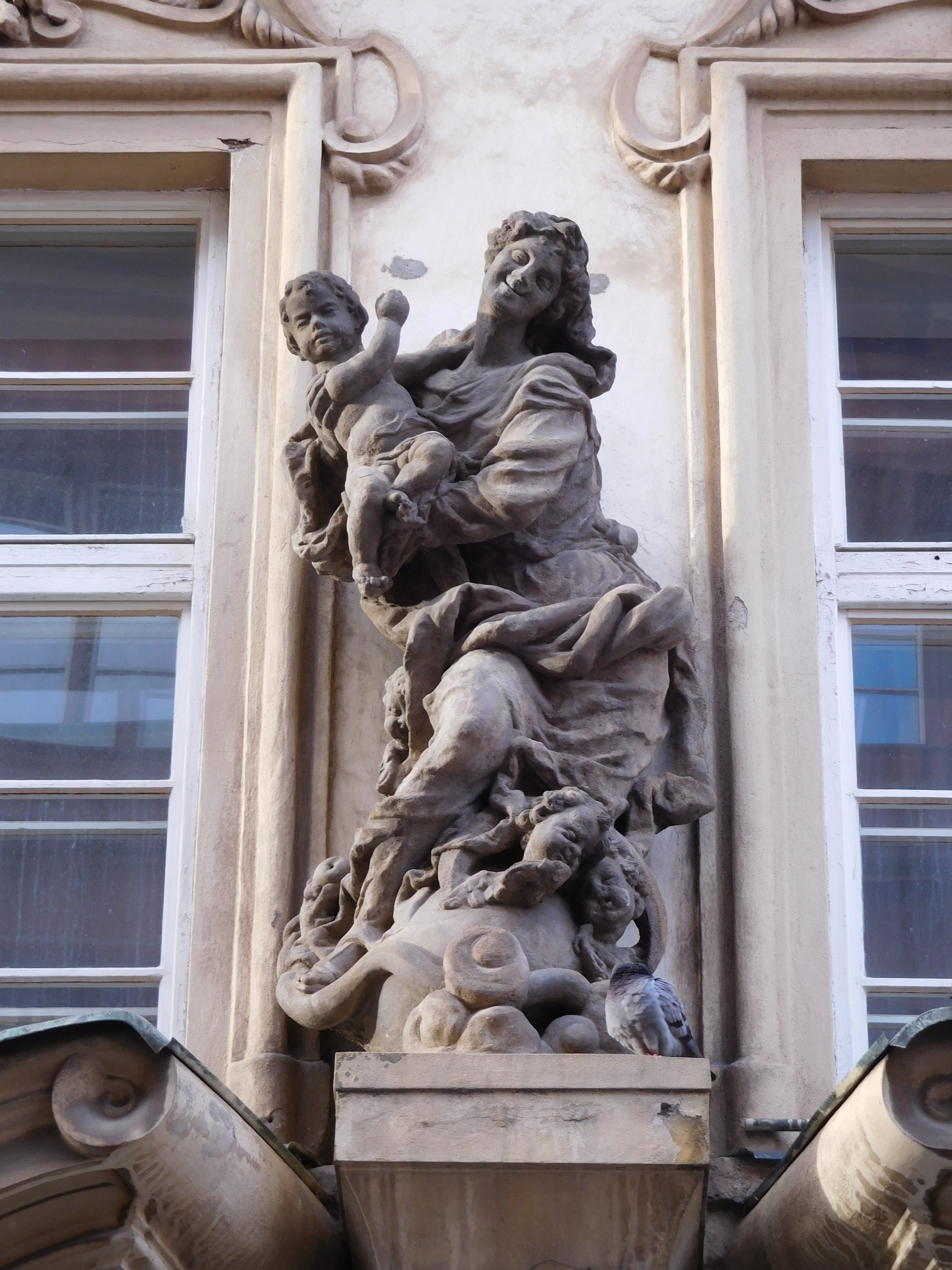
Statue of the Virgin Mary (Matyáš Bernard Braun), Celetná 23, Prague

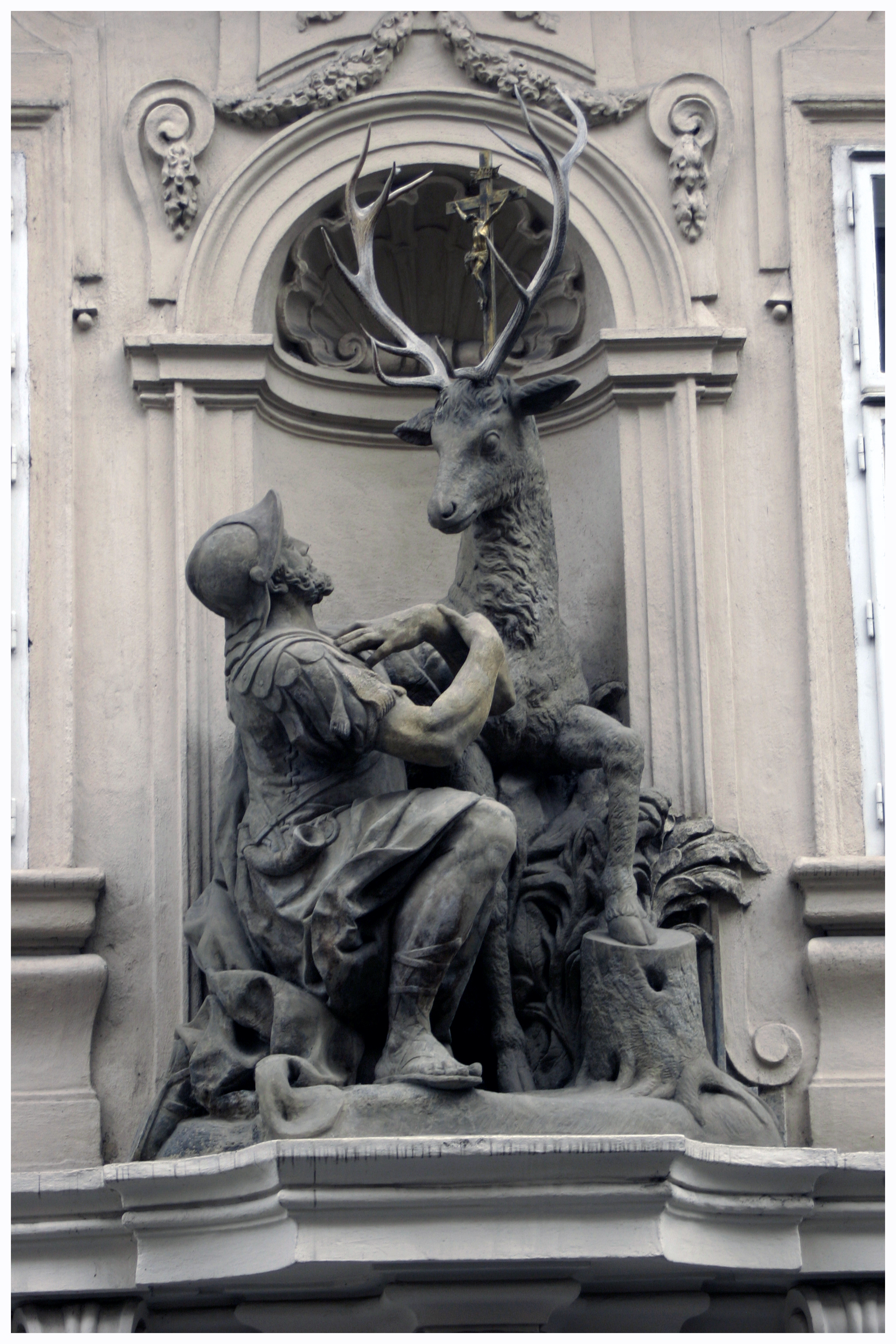
St. Hubert with a deer, (Ferdinand Maxmilián Brokoff), House at the Golden Deer, Tomášská 4, Prague

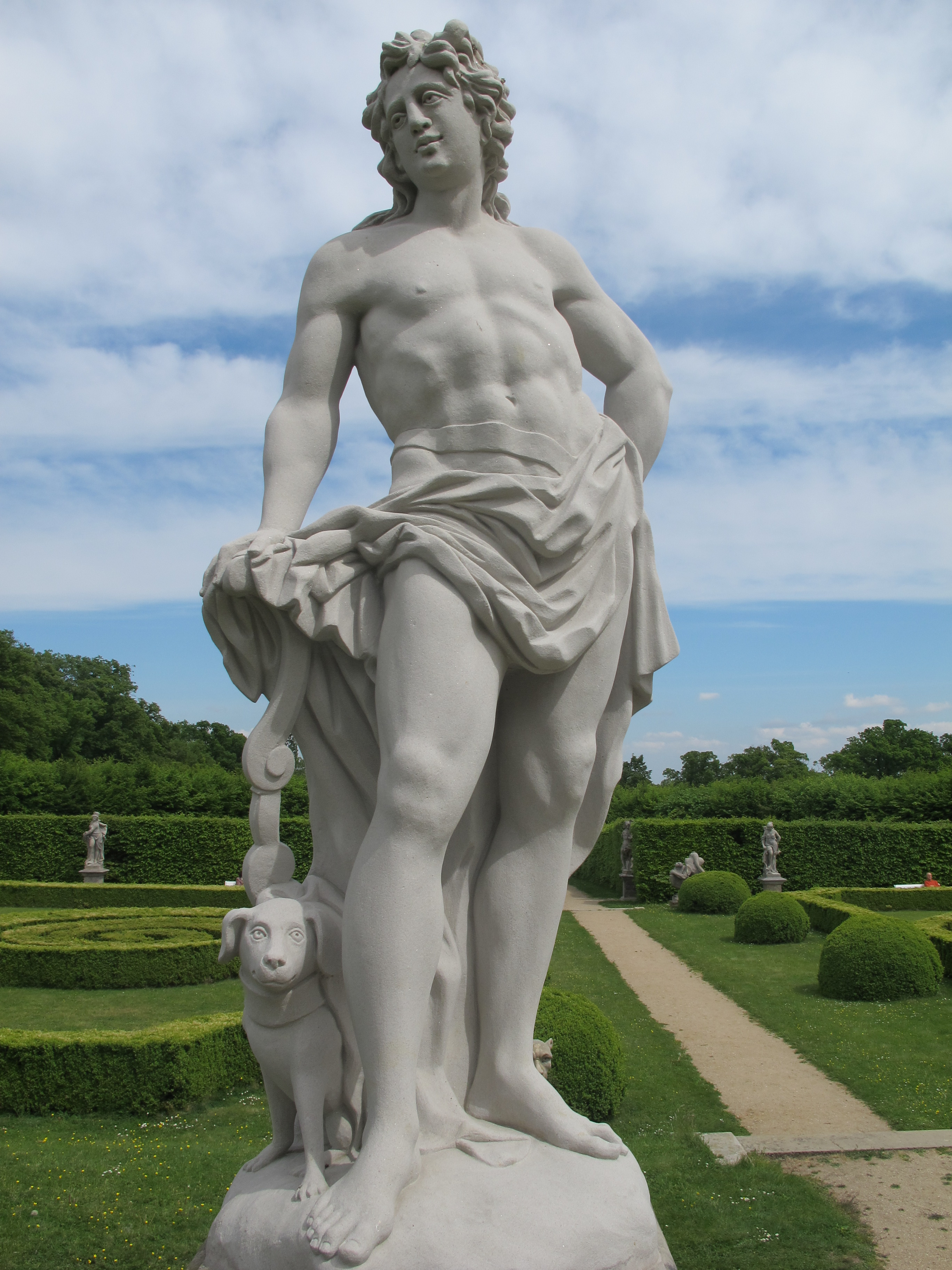
Apollo Lysá nad Labem

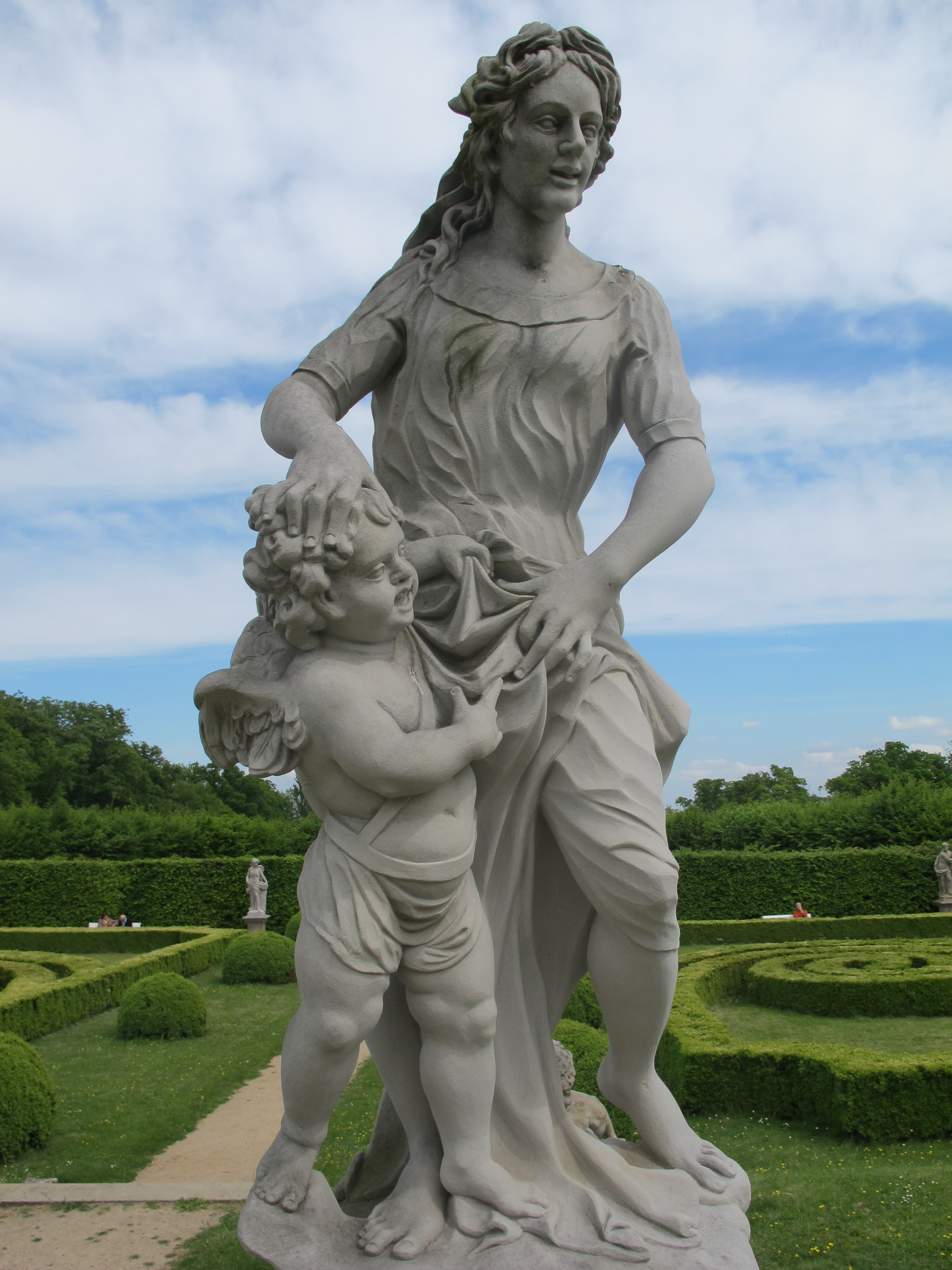
Venus with Cupid, Lysá nad Labem

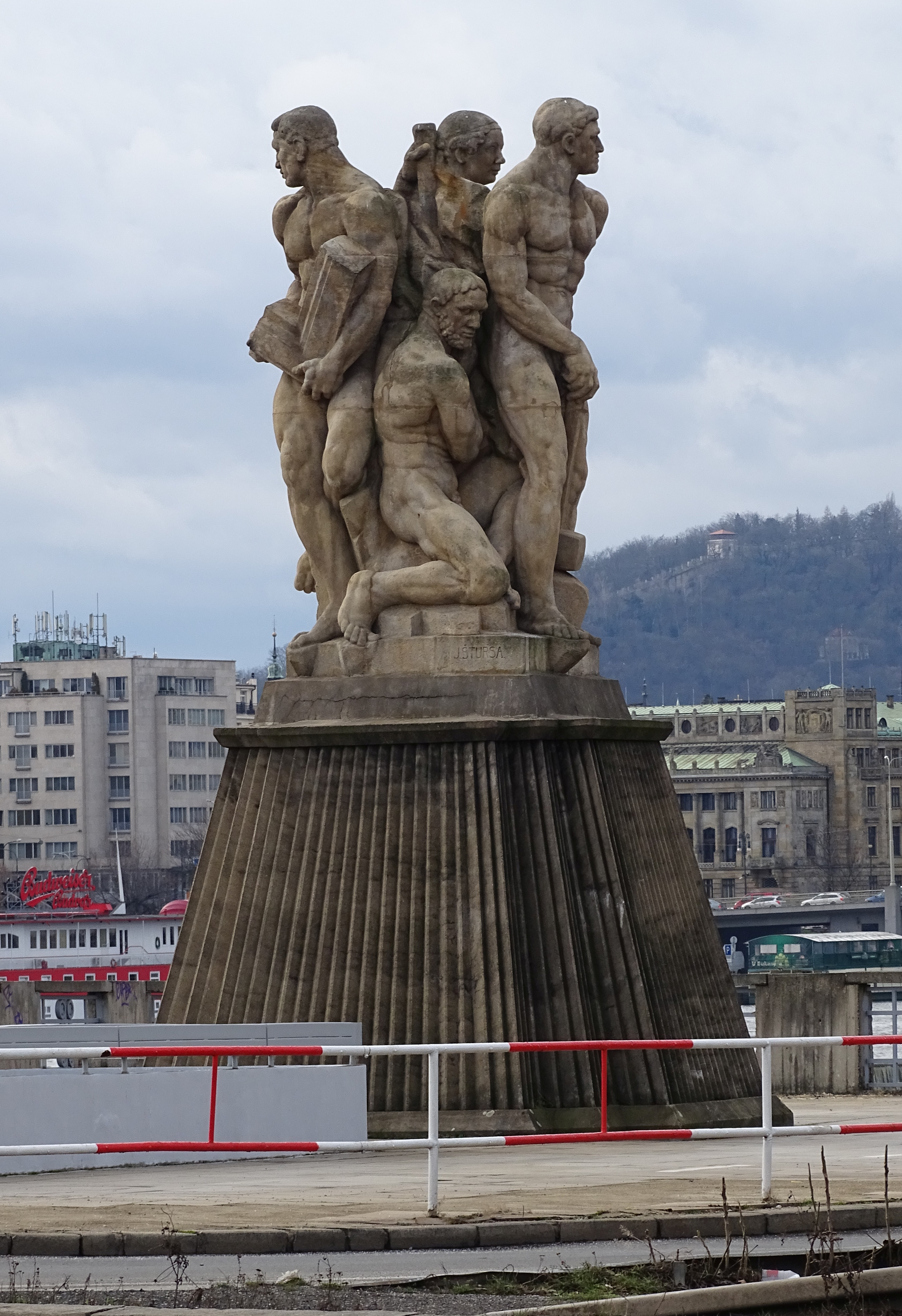
sculptural group Work and Humanity, Jan Štursa, northern bridgehead of Hlávka Bridge, Prague]

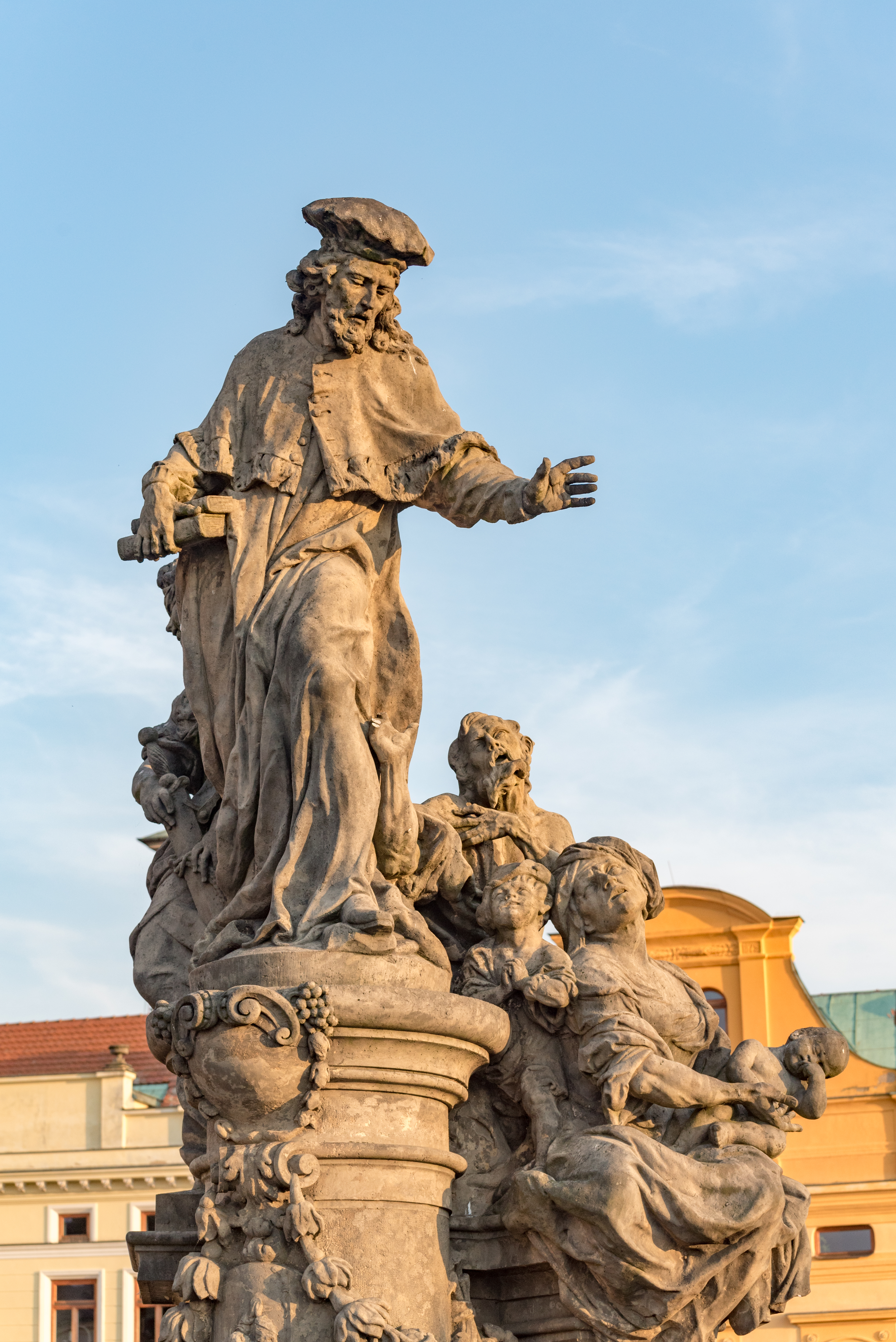
St. Ivo, (Matyáš Bernard Braun, 1711), Charles Bridge, Prague, restored by Jiří Kačer

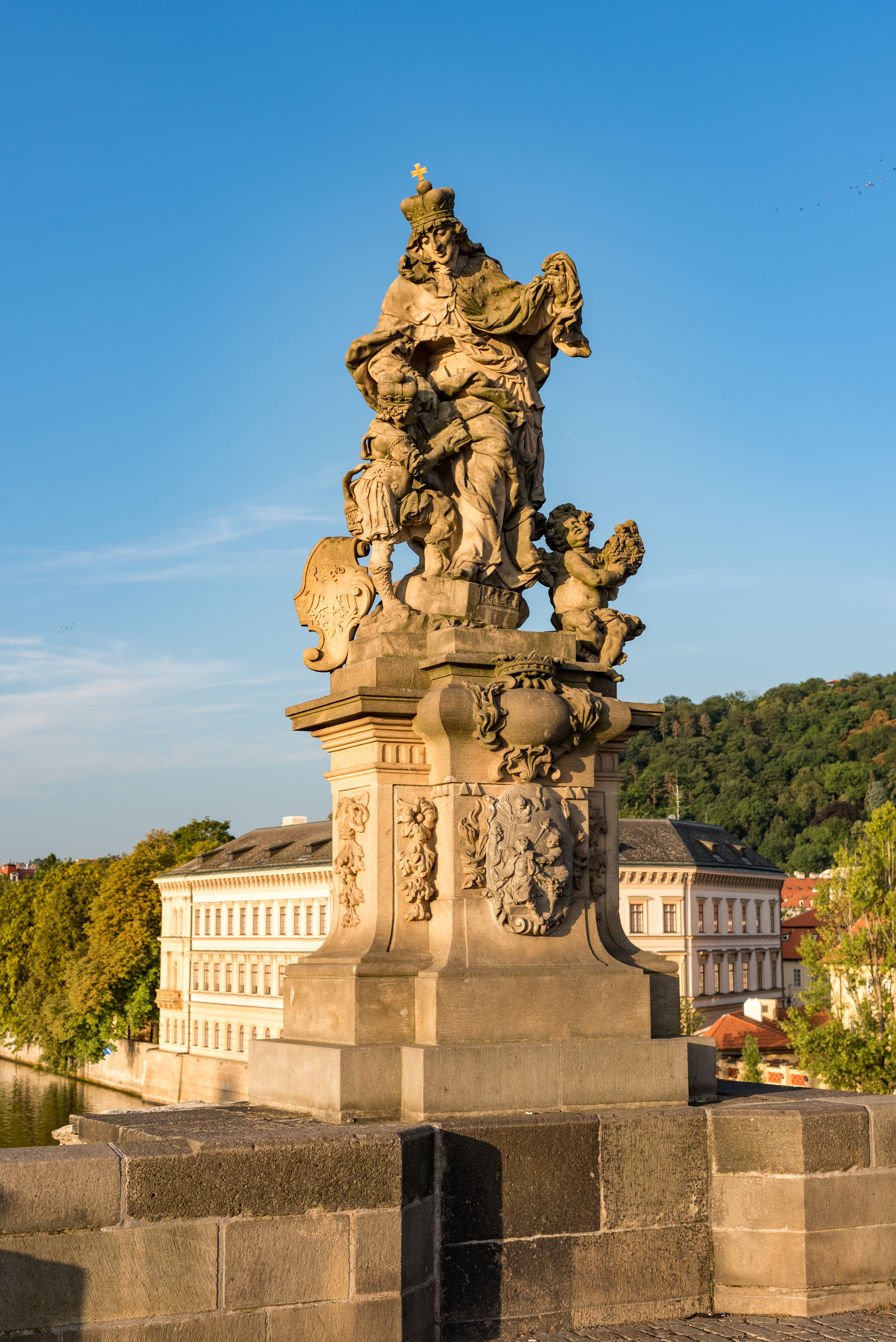
St. Ludmila with Little St. Wenceslaus, (Antonín Braun), Charles Bridge, Prague, copy by Jiří Kačer, M. Kačerová

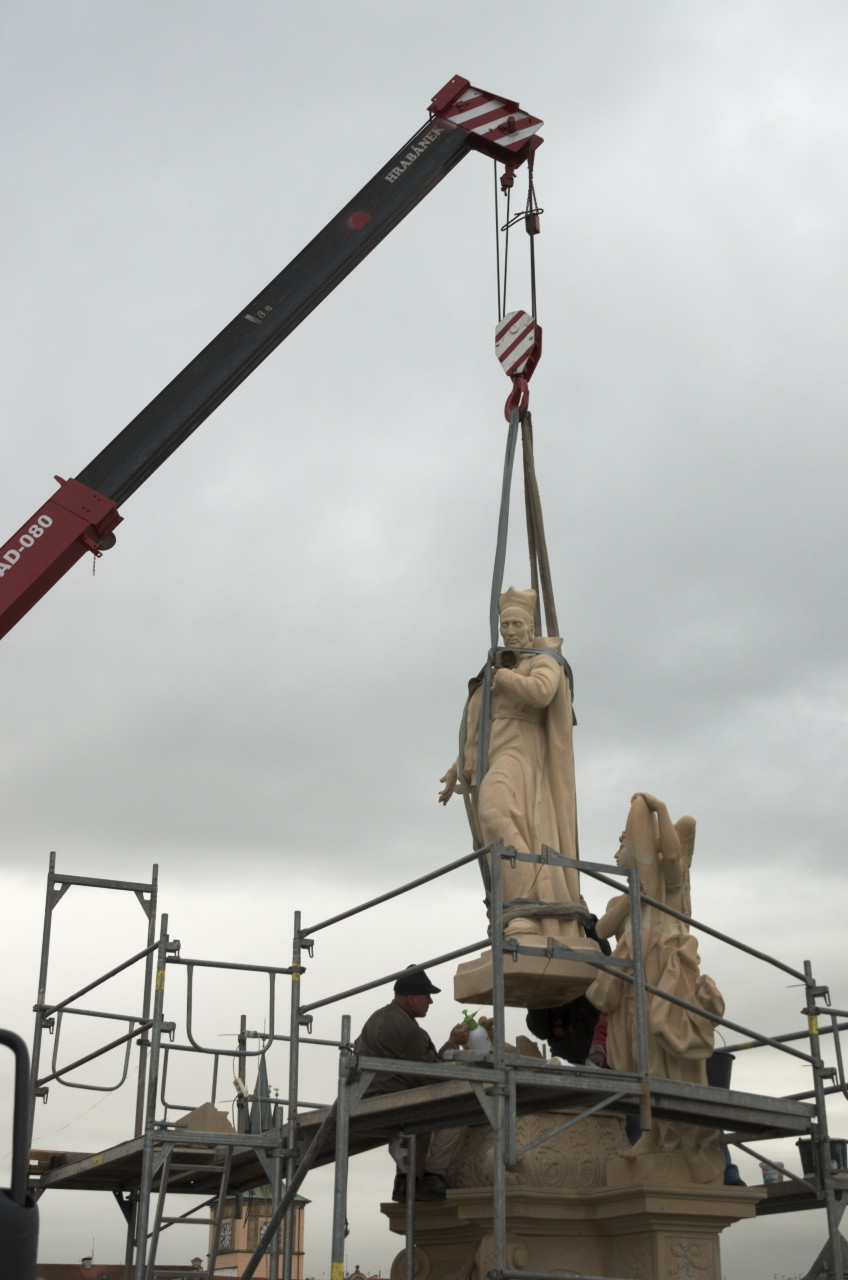
Installation of a copy of the sculpture group St. Francis Borgia, (Ferdinand Maxmilián Brokoff (on Charles Bridge, October 31, 2017

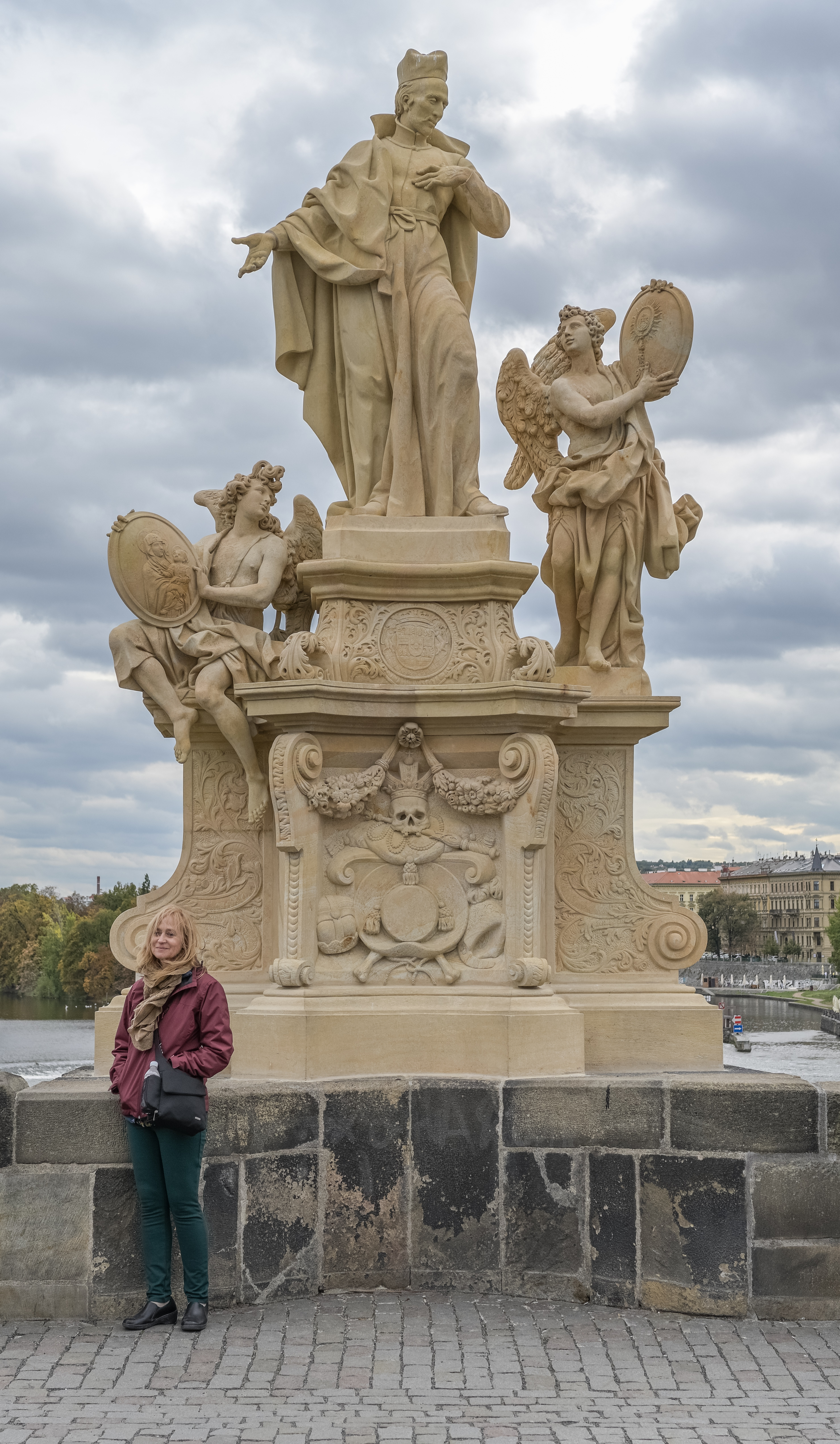
"Sculpture of St. Francis Borgia," Ferdinand Maxmilián Brokoff, Charles Bridge, Prague, copy by Jiří Kačer

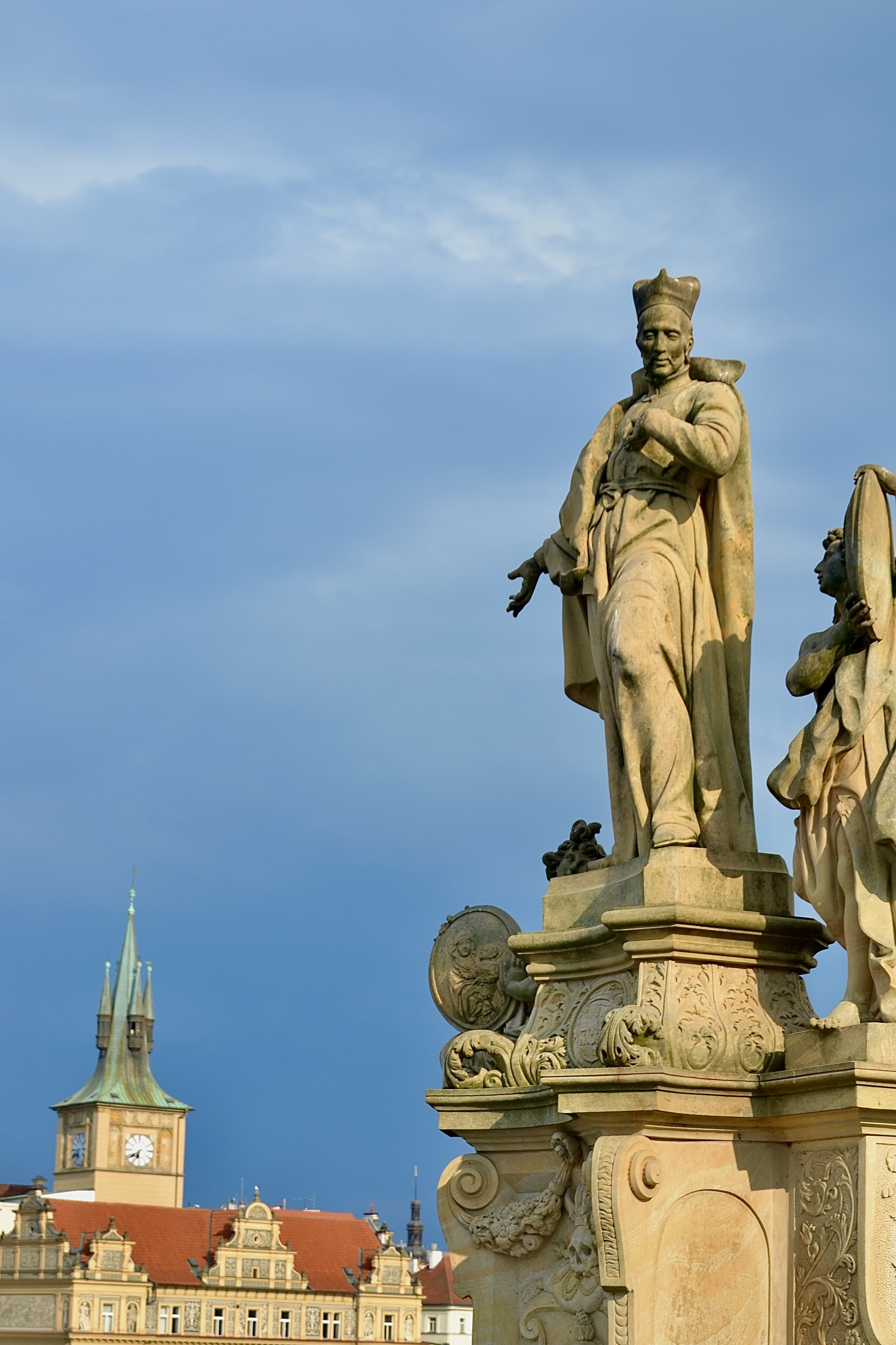
Sculpture of Francis Borgia, Charles Bridge, Prague, copy by Jiří Kačer

==== Enamels and frottages ====
- 2009-2010 - Symposium Smalt Art Vítkovice

=== Sculpture symposia ===
- 1981–1987 - Sculpture Meetings, Přední Kopanina, Prague
- 1992 - Džbán 1992. International Sculpture Symposium, Hředle
- 1993 - International Sculpture Symposium, Hořice
- 1994 - Cotangens, Adnet, Austria
- 1994 - Cotangens, Prague
- 1996 - Boháňka, Hořice
- 1998–2001 - Stones and Stars, Ondřejov Observatory
- 1998 - Granite Symposium, Jindřichův Hradec
- 1999 - Granite Symposium, Milevsko
- 1999 - Steinbildhauer Symposium, Prägraten am Großvenediger, Austria
- 2000 - Schüttkasten Klement, Austria
- 2000 - Džbán 2000. International Sculpture Symposium, Hředle
- 2001 - Cultural Bridge, Gerlesborg, Sweden
- 2003 - Sculpture Meeting "At the Wall 2003", Uherský Brod
- 2003 - The Path of Marble, Dobřichovice
- 2004 - Kunstfeld Hetzmannsdorf, Austria
- 2005 - "Sculpture Meeting 'At the Wall 2005'," Uherský Brod
- 2005 - "Sculpture Summer," Milevsko
- 2006 - Castellina in Chianti, Italy
- 2008 - "Baroque and Sandstone," Broumov
- 2009-2010 - Smalt Art, Ostrava-Vítkovice
- 2010 - Verknüpfungen, Selb
- 2011 - "Tusta Lapidaea," Domažlice
- 2019 - "Mikulov Art Symposium," Mikulov

=== Solo exhibitions (selection) ===
- 1982, 1991 - "Jiří Kačer," Institute of Macromolecular Chemistry (ÚMCH), Prague
- 1983 - Jiří Kačer, Staré Hrady Castle near Libáň
- 1992 - Jiří Kačer, Sculpture Gallery, Gotthard Hill, Hořice
- 1993 - Jiří Kačer: Reliefs and Drawings, Nová síň Gallery, Prague
- 1997 - "Jiří Kačer: Sculptures," House of Art, České Budějovice
- 1997 - "Jiří Kačer," Špejchar Gallery, Jindřichův Hradec
- 1998 - "Jiří Kačer: Sculptures," Gallery in the Garden, Kolín, Vincenc Kramář New Gallery, Prague
- 2001 - Jiří Kačer: Stones, Central Bohemian Museum, Roztoky u Prahy
- 2001 - Other Stones by Jiří Kačer, Municipal Museum, Hořice
- 2002 - Jiří Kačer: Sculptures, Ball Game Hall of Prague Castle and Royal Garden
- 2006 - Jiří Kačer: Stones, Karlovy Vary Art Gallery
- 2007 - Jiří Kačer: Sculptures, University of Pardubice Gallery
- 2007 - Jiří Kačer, Rabas Gallery, Rakovník
- 2008 - Jiří Kačer: Cores, Czech Museum of Fine Arts, Prague
- 2009 - Jiří Kačer: Stones, Gallery of Modern Art, Hradec Králové
- 2010 - Jiří Kačer: Stones, Pilsen City Gallery
- 2012 - Jiří Kačer: Rudiments, New Hall, Prague
- 2012 - Jiří Kačer: Sculptures, North Bohemian Gallery of Fine Arts in Litoměřice
- 2012 - Jiří Kačer: Sediments of Stone Memory, Gallery of Fine Arts in Most
- 2014 - Jiří Kačer, Ivan Ouhel, Frýštát Castle Gallery, Karviná
- 2014 - Jiří Kačer, Magna Gallery, Ostrava
- 2015 - Jiří Kačer, Zuzana Kačerová, Otto Gutfreund Gallery, Dvůr Králové
- 2016/2017 - "Jiří Kačer: Stones," Tábor
- 2019 - Jiří Kačer, Aleš Hnízdil, Troja Palace (GHMP)
- 2023/2024 - Jiří Kačer: Frottages and Stones, Terezín Memorial
- 2024 - Jiří Kačer: Stone and Paper, Institute of Macromolecular Chemistry (ÚMCH) Gallery, Petřiny

==== Joint exhibitions (selection) ====
- 1982 - Jiří Kačer: Sculptures, Karel Rossí: Paintings, ÚMCH, Prague
- 1987 - Rockfest 87, Palace of Culture, Prague
- 1987 - Confrontation VI, Špitálská Street, Prague
- 1987 - "Contemporary Czech Medals and Plaques," Mánes, Prague
- 1988 - "Salon of Prague Artists '88," PKOJF, Prague
- 1989 - "The Art of Restoration 1948–1988," Mánes, Prague
- 1993 - "Exhibition of Contemporary Czech Sculpture," Mánes, Prague
- 1993/4 - "Stories Without End, The Principle of Series in Czech Fine Arts," Governor's Palace, Brno, Kinsky Palace, Prague
- 1994 - "Sculpture in Stone (in honor of Josef Wagner)," Vojanovy sady, Prague
- 1995 - "Cotangens," Prague Castle
- 2000 - "Czech Stone Sculpture of the 1990s," Prague Castle
- 2002 - "III. New Zlín Salon," Zlín
- 2005 - IV. New Zlín Salon 2005, House of Art, Zlín
- 2007 - Umělecká beseda Member Exhibition, Museum and Gallery of the Orlické Mountains, Rychnov nad Kněžnou, New Town Hall, Prague, Gallery of Fine Arts in Most
- 2007 - Umělecká beseda: Awareness of Man, Masné krámy Exhibition Hall, Plzeň, Mánes, Prague
- 2008 - Born into Space, Sovinec Castle
- 2009 - Eternal Transience, Church of the Annunciation of the Virgin Mary, Litoměřice
- 2010 - Enamel Art. Landscape, Body, Radiance, Nostický Palace, Prague
- 2011 - Terra (non)firma / (Un)solid Ground, Kartografie Gallery, Prague
- 2020 - The Pilgrim Who Returns, Church of the Annunciation of the Virgin Mary, Litoměřice
- 2021 - Footprints in the Sand, Prácheň Museum in Písek
- 2022/2023 - Umělecká beseda, Institute of Macromolecular Chemistry (Makráč Gallery), Prague
- 2023/2024 - Freedom in Art, Clam-Gallas Palace, Prague
- 2024 - Central Bohemian Triennial '24, Rabas Gallery, New Hall under the High Gate, Rakovník
- 2024 - Come Closer: Sculptures, Plastics, Objects, Konojedy Castle, Úštěk

== Sources ==
=== Artists' catalogues ===
- Jiří Kačer: Plastiky / Sculptures, Juříková Magdalena, cat. 4 p., Galerie R, Praha 1991
- Jiří Kačer, Juříková Magdalena, cat. 6 p., Galerie plastik, Hořice 1992
- Jiří Kačer: Reliéfy a kresby / Reliefs and drawings, Juříková Magdalena, cat. 16 p., ČFVU, Praha 1993
- Jiné kameny Jiřího Kačera / Other stones by Jiří Kačer, Juříková Magdalena, Vanča Jaroslav, cat. 28 p., Městské muzeum, Hořice 2001
- Jiří Kačer: Skulptury / Sculptures, cat. 6 p., Galerie Univerzity Pardubice 2007
- Jiří Kačer, double leaf, Nová galerie pod Vysokou bránou, Rabasova galerie Rakovník 2007
- Jiří Kačer: Jádra / Cores, text Neumann Ivan, cat. 4 p., Gema Art Group, spol. s.r.o., Prague 2008, ISBN 978-80-86087-61-0
- Jiří Kačer: Kameny / Stones, text Neumann Ivan, cat. 8 p., Galerie moderního umění v Hradci Králové 2009, ISBN 978-80-85025-81-1
- Jiří Kačer: Rudimenta, text Neumann Ivan, Galerie Nová síň Praha 2012
- Jiří Kačer: Sochy / Statues, text Štíbr Jan, North Bohemian Gallery of Fine Arts in Litoměřice 2012
- Svatopluk Klimeš, Jiří Kačer, text Vaňous Petr, kat. 12 s., Rabasova galerie Rakovník 2016

=== Collective catalogs (selection) ===
- Peter Paszkiewicz et al., Cotangens Donau: Skulpturen; Jiri Kacer, Hubert Maier, Peter Paszkiewicz; Oberösterreichische Landesausstellung 1994, Engelhartszell; Sonderausstellung Oberösterreichsicher Kunstverein, Linz 1994
- Peter Paszkiewicz et al., Serpentin – Steinbildhauer – Symposium, Prägraten am Grossvenediger, 1999, p. 12–15
- Peter Paszkiewicz et al., Schüttkasten Klement 2000, Klement, 2000, p. 18–21
- Bohumil Fanta, Magdalena Juříková (eds.), Česká kamenná skulptura 90. let / Czech stone sculpture of the 1990s, Gemma Art, Prague 2000, ISBN 80-86087-31-X
- Cesta mramoru / The path of marble, text P. Váňa, V. Rybařík, H. Seifertová, Dobřichovice 2002, p. 16-17
- Ivan Neumann, 26. Mikulovské výtvarné symposium, dílna / 26th Mikulov Art Symposium, workshop, KANT - Karel Kerlický, Mikulov 2019, ISBN 978-80-7437-305-3

=== Monographs ===
- Ivan Neumann: Jiří Kačer, 100 + 4 p., cz., en., Gema Art Group, Ltd., Praha 2006, ISBN 80-86087-56-5
- Jan Brodský (ed.): Jiří Kačer, 64 p., cz., en., North Bohemian Gallery of Fine Arts in Litoměřice 2017, ISBN 978-80-87784-27-3

=== Encyclopedias ===
- Zbyšek Malý (ed.), Dictionary of Czech and Slovak Visual Artists 1950–2001 (V. Ka – Kom), Chagall Art Center, Ostrava 2000, pp. 24–25, ISBN 80-86171-05-1
- Anděla Horová (ed.), New Encyclopedia of Czech Fine Arts (Supplements), Academia, Publishing House of the Czech Academy of Sciences, Prague 2006, p. 347, ISBN 80-200-1209-5

=== Articles ===
- Ivo Kořán, Jiří Kačer, Původní baravná úprava sousoší svaté Ludmily na Karlově mostě v Praze / Original color treatment of the sculpture of Saint Ludmila on Charles Bridge in Prague, Zprávy památkové péče 59, no. 5, 1999, pp. 156-158
- Miloš Suchomel, Dvě barokní sousoší obohatí lapidárium ve vyšehradské Gorlici / Two Baroque Sculptures Enrich the Lapidarium in Vyšehrad Gorlice, Kámen 8, no. 1, 2000, pp. 51-55
- Eva Petrová, Džbán 2000, Kámen 7, no. 1, 2001
- Jiří Blahota, Ve znamení švédské žuly / Under the Mark of Swedish Granite, Kámen 7, no. 3, 2001, pp. 1-8
- Ivan Neumann, Svědkové trvání - sochařská tvorba Jiřího Kačera / Witnesses of Permanence – The Sculptural Work of Jiří Kačer, Prostor Zlín, vol. 10, no. 2, 2003, pp. 18-21
- Kateřina Vozárová, Sochařské setkání Při zdi 2003 / Sculpture Meeting At the Wall 2003, Prostor Zlín, Vol. 10, No. 2, 2003, pp. 22-23
- Jiří Slouka, Cesta mramoru / The Path of Marble, Kámen 10, No. 1, 2004, pp. 97-98
- (šeb), Uherský Brod, Sochařské setkání Při zdi 2003 / Sculpture Meeting At the Wall 2003, Kámen 10, No. 1, 2004, p. 98
- Jiří Blahota: Jiří Kačer - Jádra / Cores, Kámen 14, No. 2, 2008, pp. 93-94
- Jiří Bašta, Křížová cesta 21. století / Way of the Cross in the 21st Century, Krkonoše. Jizerské hory, vol. 43, no. 10, 2010, pp. 12-13
