= List of synagogues in Italy =

This list of synagogues in Italy lists active, repurposed, and no longer extant synagogues in Italy.

Dark grey background indicates that a synagogue is no longer extant. Grey background indicates that a synagogue is no longer active, but still exists.

Name	Photograph	City	Region	Rite	Founding	Status	Comments
Biella Synagogue		Biella	Piedmont	Italian	1870	Active	Contains oldest Torah scroll still in use
Synagogue of Casale Monferrato		Casale Monferrato	Piedmont	German	1595	Active	Restored in 1960s, partially used as a museum
Ferrara Synagogue		Ferrara	Emilia-Romagna	Italian; German	1485	Active	Complex containing 3 synagogues
Great Synagogue of Florence		Florence	Tuscany	Spanish	1874	Active	Congregation dates back to 1848
New Synagogue of Livorno		Livorno	Tuscany	Spanish	1958	Active	Congregation dates back to 1603
Synagogue of Naples		Naples	Campania	Spanish	1864	Active	
Padua Synagogue		Padua	Veneto	Italian	1548	Active	Has gone through 4 significant restorations; was closed in 1892 but was reopened in 1943 following the destruction of the modern synagogue.
Synagogue of Pisa		Pisa	Tuscany	Spanish	1595	Active	Parochet dates to 1470; Original Torah ark
Great Synagogue of Rome		Rome	Lazio	Italian Spanish	1904	Active	Contains Jewish Museum of Rome
Siena Synagogue		Siena	Tuscany	German	1786	Active	Congregation established in 1457
Scolagrande Synagogue		Trani	Apulia	German	1247	Active	Converted to a church in 1380; returned to synagogue in 2004; contains museum
Scolanova Synagogue		Trani	Apulia	German	1240	Active	Converted to a church in 1380; returned to synagogue in 2006
Synagogue of Trieste		Trieste	Friuli-Venezia Giulia	Italian	1908	Active	Used as storehouse for stolen Jewish goods during WWII
Synagogue of Turin		Turin	Piedmont	Italian; Spanish	1848	Active	Restored after bombardment during WWII
Synagogue of Urbino		Urbino	Marche	Italian	1633	Active	Restored in 1866; 15th-century Torah ark housed in New York Jewish Museum
Italian Synagogue		Venice	Veneto	Italian	1575	Active	Restored in 1970 and 2023
Levantine Synagogue		Venice	Veneto	Spanish	1541	Active	Reconstructed in 17th century; restored between 1976 and 1981
Spanish Synagogue		Venice	Veneto	Italian; Spanish	1580	Active	Congregation dates back to 1555
Vercelli Synagogue		Vercelli	Piedmont	Italian German	1878	Active	Restored in 2007
Synagogue of Verona		Verona	Veneto	German	1864	Active	Construction wasn't finished until 1929; preceded by Medieval synagogue
Viareggio Synagogue		Viareggio	Tuscany	Spanish	1955	Active	Congregation dates to end of 19th century
Bova Marina Synagogue		Bova Marina	Calabria		4th Century AD	Archaeological Site	Inactive since 600 AD, turned into an archaeological site in 1983
Old Synagogue of Livorno		Livorno	Lazio	Spanish	1603	Inactive	Destroyed in 1944
Ostia Synagogue		Ostia Antica	Tuscany	Spanish	c. 50 AD	Inactive	Inactive since the 5th century AD
Cherasco Synagogue		Cherasco	Piedmont	Italian	1797 or earlier	Inactive	
Mole Antonelliana		Turin	Piedmont	None	1863	Inactive	Was originally conceived as a synagogue, but project was never completed and the city took over the building and completed it.
Synagogue of Reggio Emilia		Reggio Emilia	Emilia-Romagna		1849	Inactive	Synagogue was rebuilt in the same location as its original from 1672; building was damaged during WWII and parts of its interior were transferred to Kirit Shmu‘el in Haifa. The building is currently used for cultural exhibits.
Canton Synagogue		Venice	Veneto	Shuadit	1532	Inactive	Synagogue has been out of use since 1917 following forced disbansion of the Jewish community; has been a Jewish museum since 1989
Great German Synagogue		Venice	Veneto	German	1528	Inactive	Synagogue has been out of use since 1917 following forced disbansion of the Jewish community; has been a Jewish museum since 2017
Synagogue of Pitigliano		Pitigliano	Tuscany	Spanish	1598	Active, but no congregation	Synagogue was rebuilt following a collapse in 1960; open to visitors and worshippers with no minyan of its own due to declining post-Holocaust population
Synagogue of Gorizia		Gorizia	Friuli-Venezia Giulia	German	1756	Inactive	Restored but used as a cultural museum; congregation dates back to 1699
Ramaglianti Road Synagogue		Florence	Tuscany		1437	Inactive	Was largely defunct by 1848, interior destroyed by German bombings during WWII
Synagogue of Monte San Savino		Monte San Savino	Tuscany	Italian	1600s	Inactive	Congregation was forced to flee in 1799; was purchased by the municipality in 1924 and was restored & is not used beyond tourist visitation.
Synagogue of Senigallia		Senigallia	Marche	Italian	1634	Active	Synagogue was looted in 1799, and its interior was redone in the 19th century; interior was damaged in 1930 earthquake and its inside was redone.
Synagogue of Rovigo		Rovigo	Veneto		1930	Inactive	Congregation was re-established in 1858, but synagogue was demolished in 1930 and rebuilt elsewhere; interior contents were transferred to Padua after WWII and the building became a residential home.
Synagogue of Sorano		Sorano	Tuscany		1500s	Inactive	Synagogue abandoned at end of 19th century due to emigration to Pitigliano; currently used as a cultural venue
Synagogue of Savoca		Savoca	Sicily		1408 (at least)	Inactive	Synagogue existed at least by 1408; was seized by Viceroy in 1470 due to noise complaints
Synagogue of Pesaro		Pesaro	Marche	Spanish	1642	Inactive	Synagogue is fully preserved, but it is no longer used as a place of worship, and many of its furnishings such as its Torah ark and bema have been transferred to other congregations
Twin synagogues of Ancona		Ancona	Marche	Spanish; Italian	1876	Active	Complex is the sixth synagogue in the city, following the 1860 destruction of the Spanish synagogue and 1932 destruction of the Italian synagogue; much of its original contents have been transferred to other synagogues
Synagogue of Sermide		Sermide	Lombardy		1598	Inactive	Synagogue was abandoned in 1936 due to declining population and its contents were transferred to other synagogues; it was damaged in an earthquake in 2012 & is currently a private home.
Synagogue of Sabbioneta		Sabbioneta	Lombardy		1824	Inactive	Synagogue was abandoned starting in the 20th century; it was restored in both 1994 and 2012 and serves as a museum of the Jewish community in the city.
Norsa Torrazzo synagogue		Mantua	Lombardy	Italian	1531	Active	Congregation formed in 1531; synagogue destroyed in 1630 and rebuilt in 1751; interior of the synagogue was transferred piece-by-piece to a new location in the city at the turn of the 20th century
Central Synagogue of Milan		Milan	Lombardy	Italian	1892	Active	Building excluding facade and floor were destroyed during WWII bombing; reconstructed in 1950s and renovated in 1997.
Synagogue of Ostiano		Ostiano	Lombardy		1619	Abandoned	Building was renovated in 1713 during its conversion to a synagogue; its roof caved in in 2006 and has been abandoned & dilapidating since
Synagogue of Moncalvo		Moncalvo	Piedmont	Italian	1732	Repurposed	Synagogue built a facade in 1860 and was abandoned & converted post-WWII. It was repurposed into a warehouse, its furnishings were taken to Ramat Gan, and the owners restored the exterior to its original state in 2014.
Synagogue of Bologna		Bologna	Emilia-Romagna		1928	Active	Congregation dates back to the late 16th century; building was destroyed in 1943 and reconstructed faithfully to its original design in 1954.
