= La Giudecca =

Geographical term used In Southern Italy and Sicily

La Giudecca [la dʒuˈdɛkka] was a term used In Southern Italy and Sicily to identify any urban district (or a portion of a village) where Jewish communities dwelled and had their synagogues and businesses.

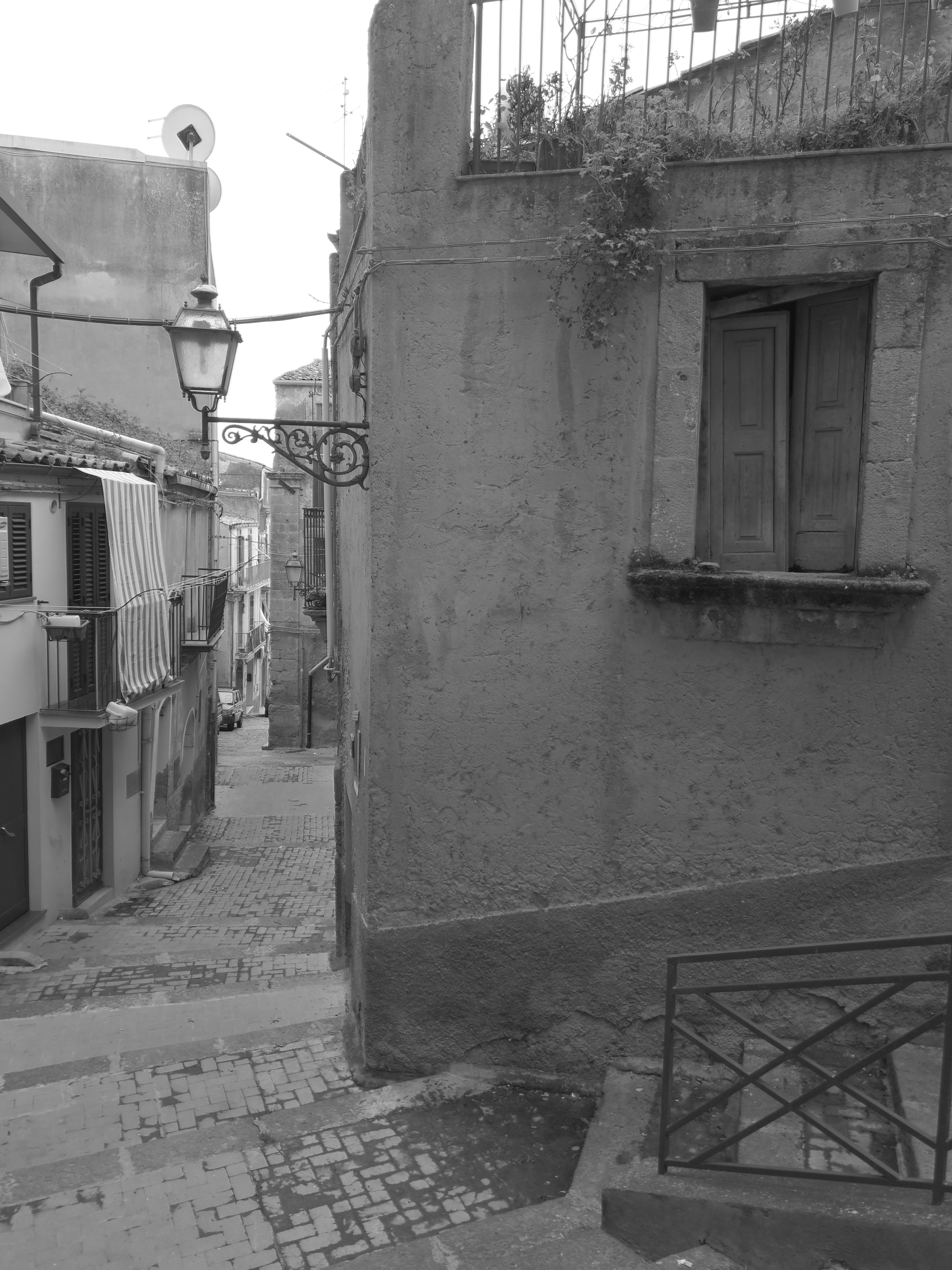
Jewish quarter "Giudecca" or "Judeca" Caltagirone, Italy

Unlike the compulsory ghettos of Northern Italy and elsewhere, in some Southern Italian hamlets and cities Jewish families and their members voluntarily chose to live in certain areas but were free to travel and even contribute together with their Christian neighbours to the success or commercial, cultural and artistic progress of a region. A very few Sicilian Giudeccas were unhealthy and declined, in fact, the majority included many craftsmen, doctors and tradesmen.

== Etymology ==
Judeca and Giudecca are the corrupt or jargonized medieval versions of the Latin female adjective Judaica, meaning Jewish or Judaean. The Jewess or The Jewry are other plausible meanings.

It is not known why the Venetian island of Giudecca acquired that name, as there is no evidence of Jewish settlement there.

== Jewish neighbourhoods in Southern Italy ==
Italian Region	Southern Italian cities, small towns, villages with their Hebrew districts
Sicily	Palermo: Meschita and Guzzetta. In the Arab Balarm these two sites were called Harat-Al-Yahud (The Jewish Ward). · Odonyms: Piazza Croce dei Vespri, Piazza della Borsa, Vicolo della Meschita, Piazzetta della Meschita, Vicolo degli Agonizzanti, Via Calderai, Via Mastrangelo, Via Giardinaccio, Via del Ponticello, Via Bernabei, Via San Cristoforo, Vicolo Corpora, Via Lampionelli, Via Divisi. · Visible traces: Church of Saint Nicholas of Tolentino (ex-synagogue), Arco dei Cartai, Arco della Meschita.; Caccamo; Castelbuono; Castronovo di Sicilia; Polizzi Generosa; Termini Imerese: Celtigene.; Messina: Tirone and Paraporto.; Castroreale; San Marco d'Alunzio: Moschita.; Limina; Taormina: Giudecca.; Savoca: Visible traces: the Ruins of an old Synagogue .; Milazzo: Borgo Vecchio. Odonyms: Via Sinagoga.; Lipari; Catania: Giudecca Soprana, Giudecca Sottana, Piano di Giacobbe; Caltagirone: San Giuliano, Miracoli. · Odonyms: Via Madonna della Stella - Via Judeca.; Castiglione di Sicilia; Mineo: Contrada Rabbato. · Odonyms: Via Ebrei; Paternò; Randazzo:Santa Maria alla Iudeca; Syracuse: Giudecca, San Giovanni delle Grotte Pelopee.; Lentini:Serre di San Pietro or Serre della Scalderia, Judeca.; Palazzolo Acreide; Rosolini; Cittadella Maccari; Noto: Judaica Parva (from Latin Parva = The Little); Enna: Iudeca. Visible traces: In this area the Church of Saint Mark and the Nunnery of the Discalced Carmelites took the place of the ancient city's Synagogue.; Agira; Calascibetta; Piazza Armerina: Piano Canali.; Caltanissetta: Zingari (=Gypsies).; Gela; Sofiana; Ragusa: La Chancata.; Caucana; Comiso; Modica: Cartellone.; Historical events: On 15 August 1474, the Christian community of Modica wreaked a brutal havoc on the Jewish dwellers of Cartellone, the so-called "Strage dell'Assunta". This episode has been the first and most horrible antisemitic massacre to the detriment of the Sicilian Israelites. During the evening of Assumption's Day, with a single collective raptus numberless citizens (fomented by fanatic Catholic preachers) slaughtered about 360 innocents causing a total and fierce devastation. The incitement that echoed through the streets was: "Hurrah for Mary! Death to the Jews!" (Viva Maria! Morte ai Giudei!): Santa Croce Camerina; Scicli; Agrigento: Terra Vecchia; Bivona; Caltabellotta; Cammarata; Sciacca: Cadda; Siculiana; Trapani: Giudecca and Santa Margherita; Alcamo: Giudecca di San Calogero Odonyms:Via Giacomo Matteotti (once named Via Sinagoga); Erice: Rabato Odonyms: Via Giudaica - Vicolo Giudaica; Marsala; Mazara del Vallo: Jureca; Mozia; Salemi
Calabria	Reggio: Giudecca. · Odonyms: Via Giudecca - Via Osanna - Via Aschenez (=Ashkenaz).; Catanzaro: Cafarone; Cosenza: Giudeca or Iudaica; Nicotera: Musconà and Timpone; Gerace; Bova: Giudecca; Montalto; Altomonte; Monteleone; Castrovillari; Bisignano; Seminara; Acri; Santa Severina: Iudea; Nicastro; Crotone; Rossano; Corigliano
Campania	Naples: Monterone and San Marcellino, Patrizzano, Giudecca Vecchia di Forcella, Giudecca Grande di Portanova, Giudechella del Porto.; Sorrento; Amalfi; Salerno: Giudecca
Basilicata	Melfi
Apulia	Acquaviva delle Fonti; Altamura: Claustro giudecca; Bari; Barletta; Brindisi: Rione Giudea; Grottaglie: Porta sant'Antonio; Manduria: via giudecca; Martina Franca; Nardò; Oria: Rione Giudea; Ostuni; Taranto; Trani: Giudecca or La Giudea, Porta Antica and Scolanova
Sardinia	Cagliari: Giudaria di Castello; Oristano; Alghero

== Some names and their meanings ==
- Meschita derives from Arabic Masjid meaning Mosque through the Castilian "mezquita".
- Guzzetta is the altered name Achuzzath, a Hebrew word that means "possession, property, estate".
- Cafarone, corruption of Cafarnao or the local Hebrew dialectization of "Kefar Aharon", namely "The Hamlet of Aaron" (maybe a Jewish religious leader, a rich or prominent Jewish personage from Catanzaro or the simple respectful eponym to remember Moses' brother).
- Rabato (or Rabbato) is the Sicilian Arabicized translation of Rabāṭ (literally a Stronghold or a Fortress). The ancient fortified zone of Erice was mainly populated by Jews.
- Cartellone should not be explained by its literal Italian meaning notwithstanding a local legend asserting that a "big placard" was placed in the quarter's main entrance to make easily manifest to Christians the Jewish presence in it. Nowadays, visible traces of such "large signboards" or "showy signposts", if any, have completely vanished or been removed. According to another folk legend the houses' doors and their outer facings were adorned with little tablets reproducing the Mosaic Laws or a few precepts of Torah. That might be the simple result of Christian misinterpretation of the mezuzah, where little scrolls are kept in the doorposts. The most likely explanation is related to a typical Modica's craftsmanship. Cartellone is the male augmentative of medieval Latin word "cartallus, cartella" that qualified a "woven hamper" or more precisely, in this case, a "big woven hamper" (to identify an entire specific category of workingmen and workingwomen). Aforetime, in that area, the production of wicker baskets was chiefly monopolized by Jewish basket-makers and today many craftsmen of Cartellone still practise this kind of patient traditional handiwork. A last surmise would be a likely dialectal mangling of a Hebrew toponym called "Qiryath Alon" or "Qiryath Aloni" (The Village of the Oak or The Village of Alon).

== Notes and references ==
- Sicilia Judaica, N. Bucaria. Flaccovio Editore (1996).
