= Padua Synagogue =

Synagogue in Padua, Italy

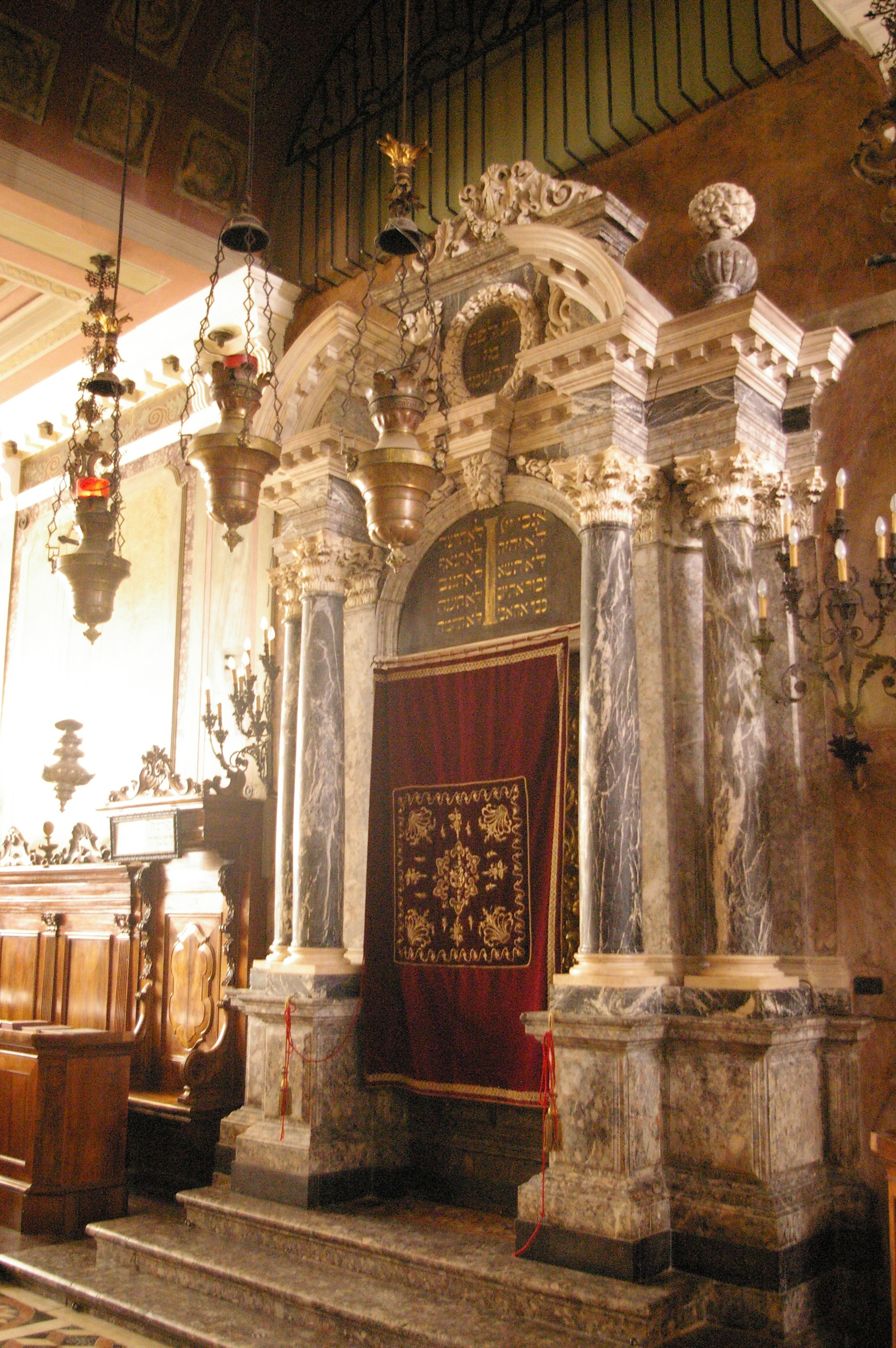
- The Torah Ark in the synagogue, in 2008

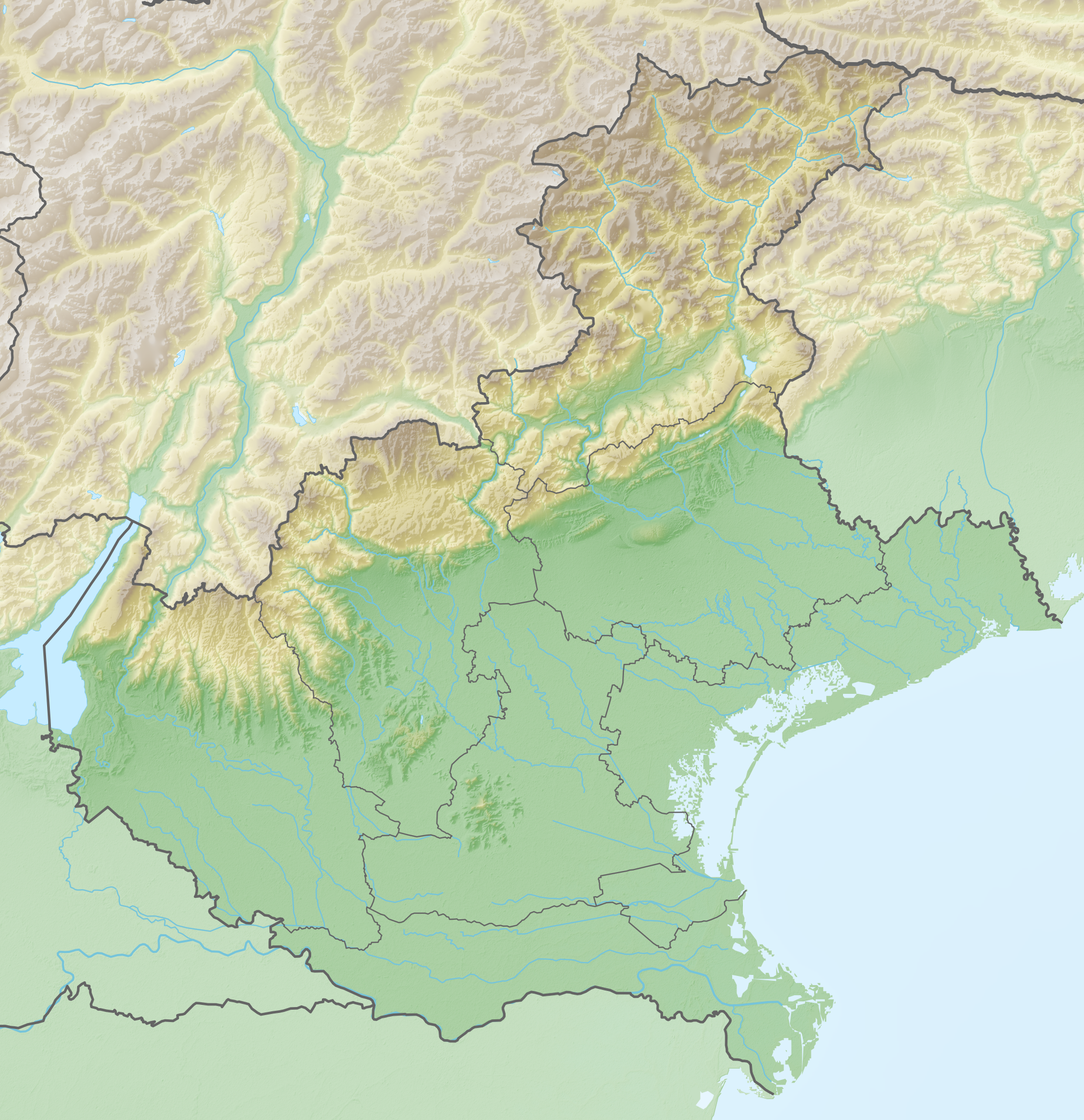
- Location of the synagogue in Veneto

Religion
- Affiliation: Orthodox Judaism
- Rite: Italian rite
- Ecclesiastical or organizational status: Synagogue
- Status: Active

Location
- Location: San Martino e Solferino 9, Padua, Veneto
- Country: Italy
- Interactive map of Padua Synagogue
- Coordinates: 45°24′21″N 11°52′33″E

Architecture
- Type: Synagogue architecture
- Style: Baroque
- Completed: 1548

Specifications
- Length: 18 m (59 ft)
- Width: 7 m (23 ft)
- Materials: Brick

The Padua Synagogue, also called the Great Italian Synagogue in Padua (Italian: Sinagoga di Padova di rito italiano), is an Orthodox Jewish congregation and synagogue, that is located at San Martino e Solferino 9, in Padua, Veneto, Italy. Completed in 1548, it is the only synagogue still in use of the several that flourished in the university town of Padua from the Renaissance through World War II.

== History ==
The Italian Synagogue was built in 1548.

The synagogue underwent renovation and/or restoration in 1581, 1631, 1830, and 1865. It was closed in 1892 when the community built a modern synagogue, but reopened after the war because in 1943 fascists burned the modern synagogue.

The synagogue is located at 9 Via San Martino and Solferino in the historic ghetto. It is in the same building as the offices of the Jewish community of Padua. Students visiting the university are welcome to pray with the congregation. Visitors can see the synagogue by contacting the Jewish community.

== Architecture ==
The Baroque synagogue measures 18 by 7 m (59 by 23 ft). As is usual in Italian synagogues, the Bimah and Torah Ark are located at opposite sides of the room, with the space in between left vacant to accommodate the processional. What is unusual about the synagogue at Padua is that the Ark and Bimah are placed on the synagogues's long walls.

The baroque, sixteenth century Torah Ark is made from the wood of a plane tree that was struck down by lightning in the University's famous botanical garden. It features gilded doors, four Corinthian columns made of black marble with white veining, and carved foliage. The balduchin is in the form of a broken pediment.

The "majestic" Bimah is reached by a curved flight of eight steps on each side. It features an octagonal balduchin supported by four columns and four pilasters (two projecting form the wall.) The Corinthian capitals of the pillars and pilasters are gilded. Elaborate baroque carvings surmount the balduchin.

The ceiling is coffered and painted. The area between the Torah Ark and Bimah is a coffered barrel vault, with large, heavily-carved baroque rosettes in each recess.

The historic women's gallery is upstairs. Today, the synagogue has a women's section on the main floor.

== Gallery ==
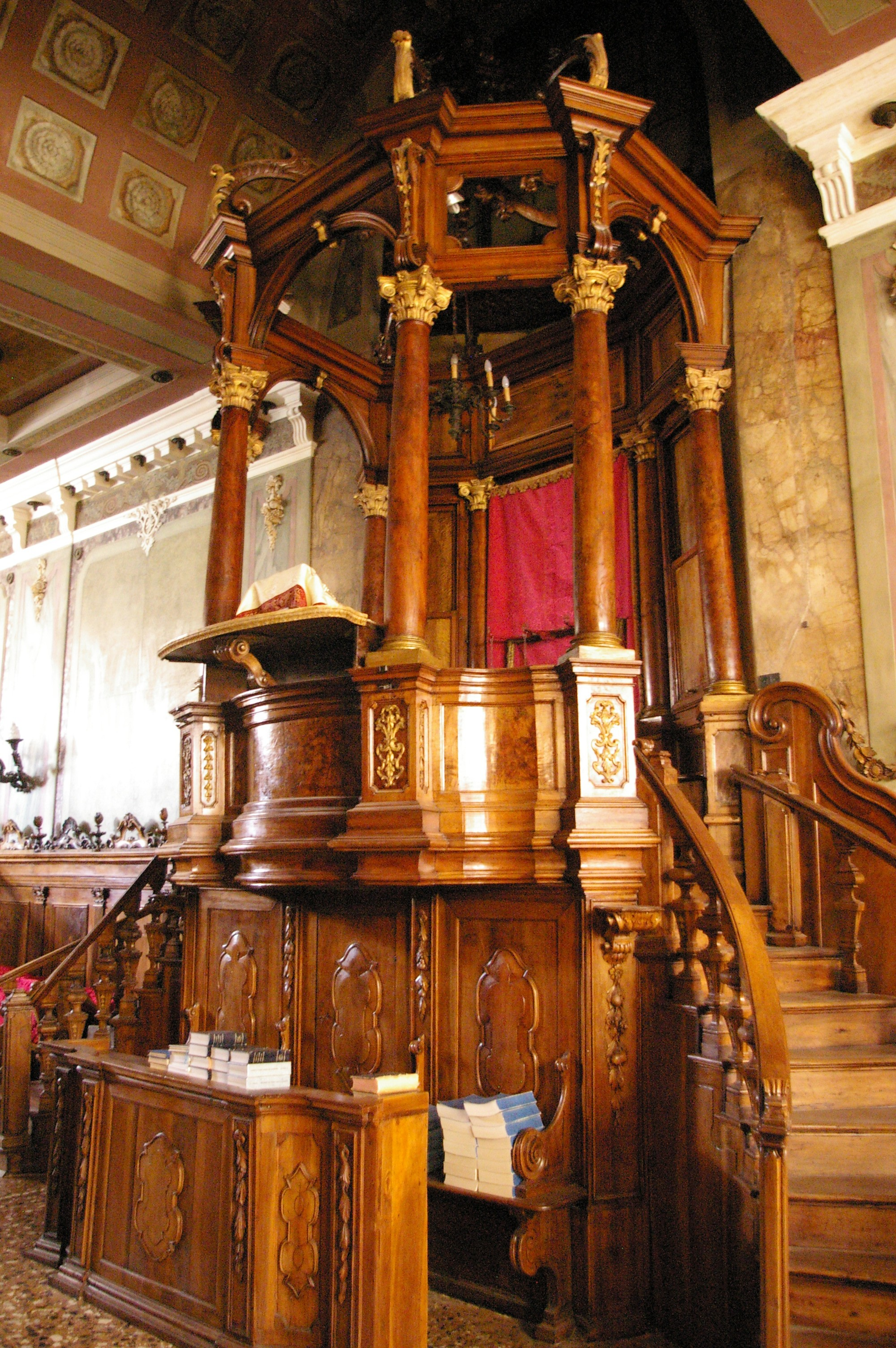
Bimah

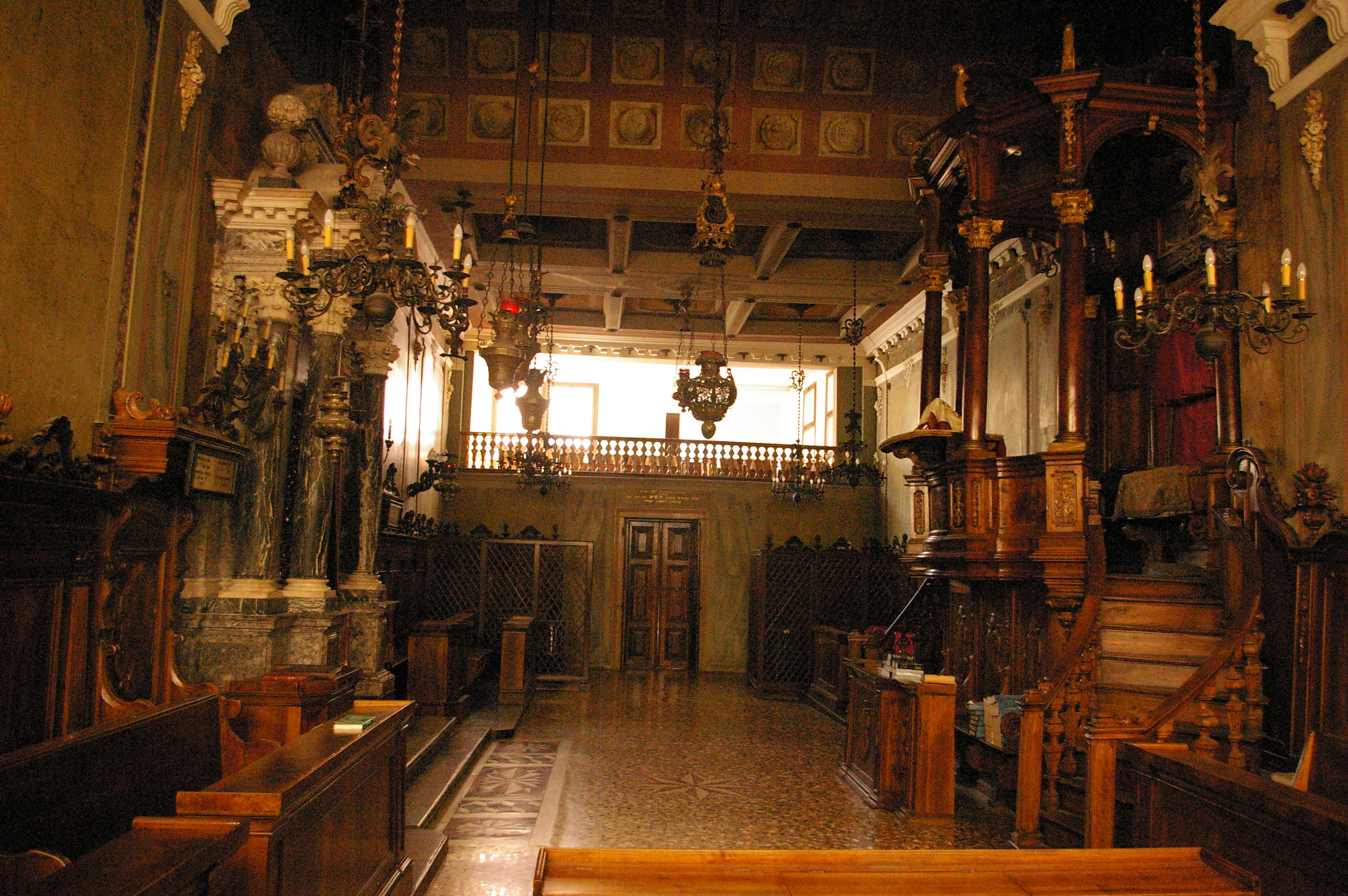

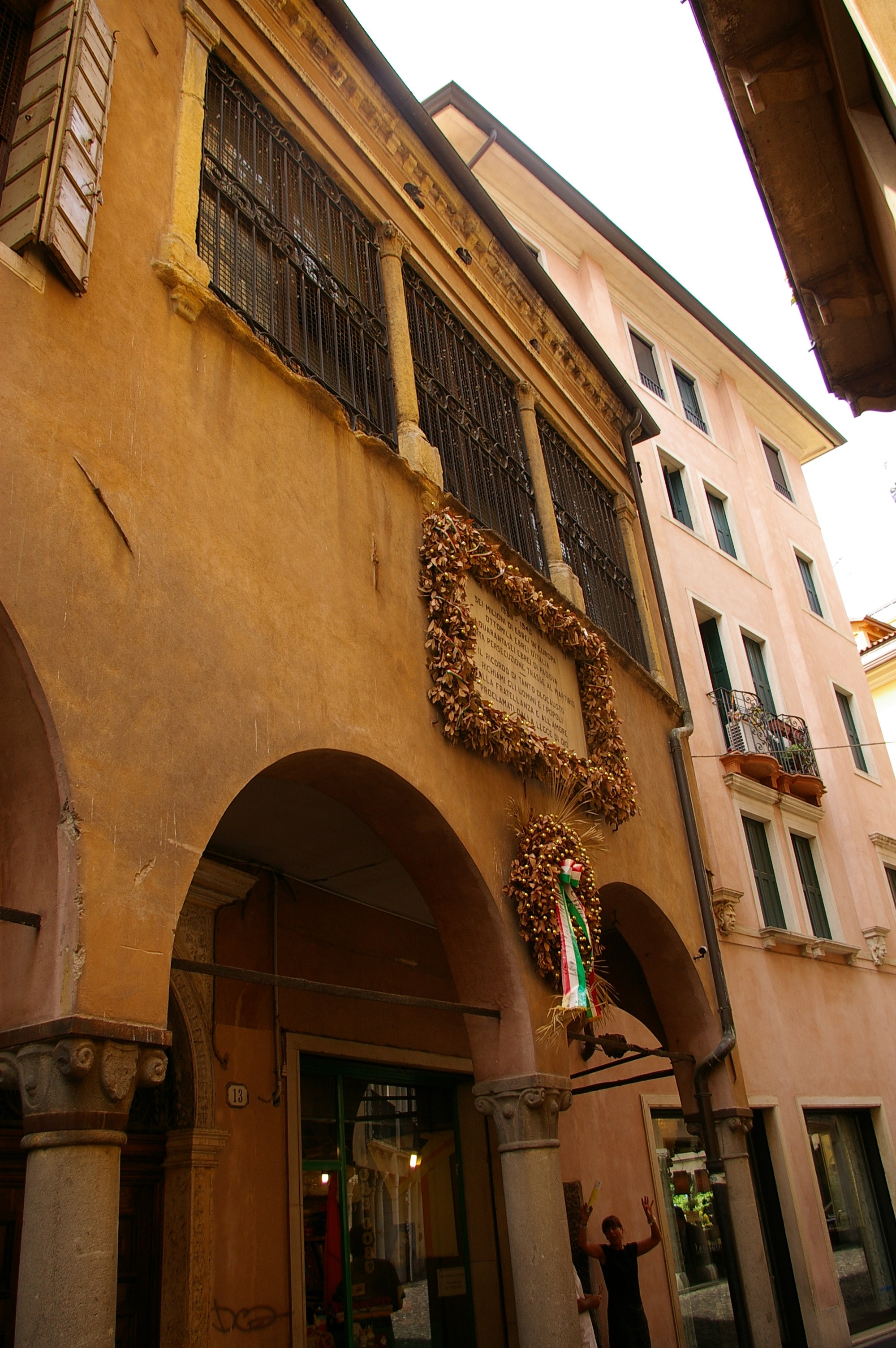
The exterior

== See also ==
- History of the Jews in Italy
- List of synagogues in Italy
