= Synagogue of Sorano =

Synagogue in Sorano

- Sinagoga di Sorano
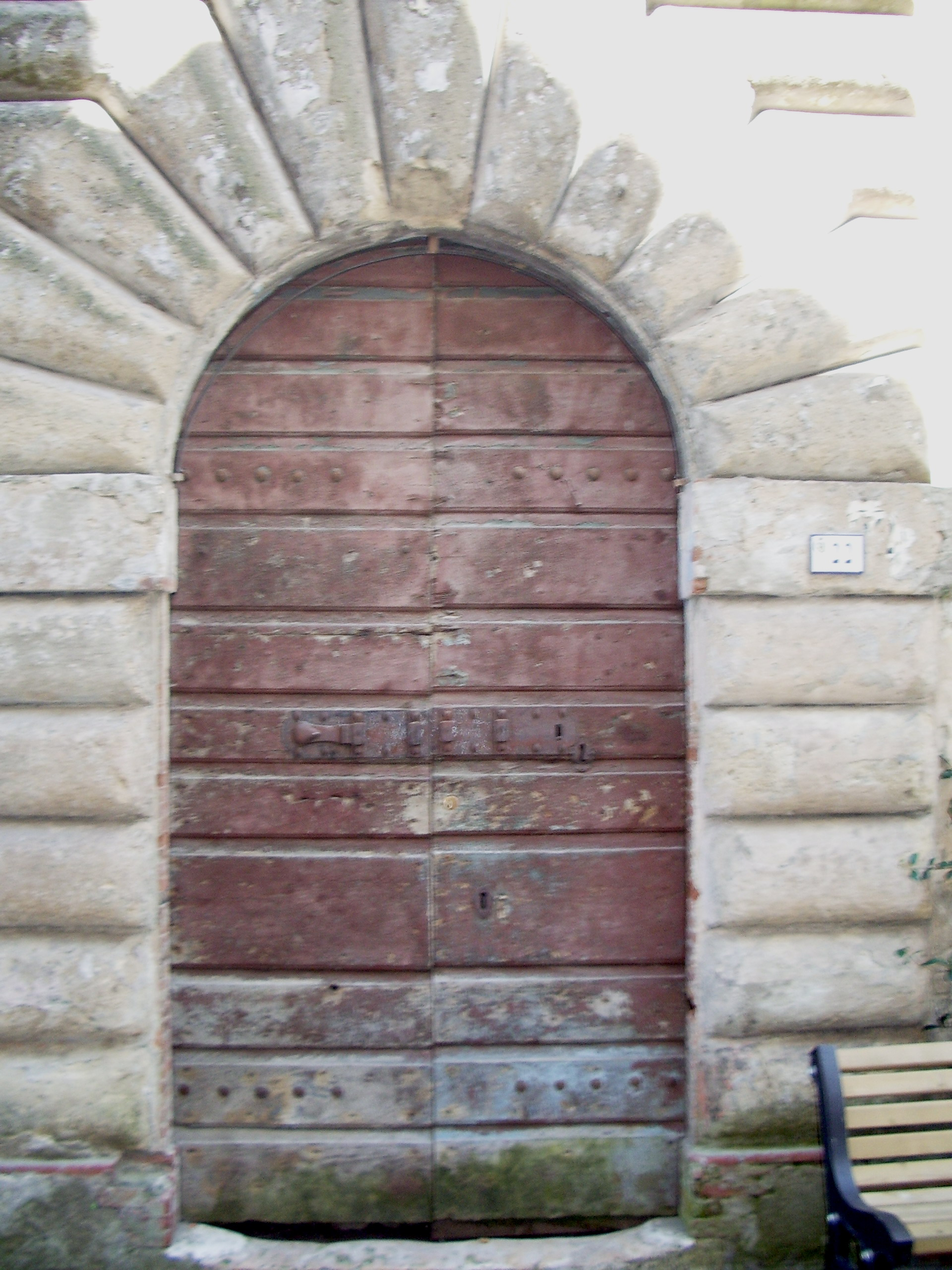
- Entrance to the synagogue

Religion
- Affiliation: Judaism
- Ecclesiastical or organizational status: Inactive, used as cultural venue

Location
- Location: Via Giovanni Selvi 22, Sorano, Italy
- Interactive map of Synagogue of Sorano
- Coordinates: 42.682932°N 11.714040°E

Architecture
- Completed: 16th century
- Delisted: 19th century

The Synagogue of Sorano (Italian: Sinagoga di Sorano) is a former Jewish synagogue in Sorano, Italy.

== History ==
The synagogue was likely established in the 16th century, and was consecrated until the end of the 19th century. Jews in Sorano, at the end of the 19th century, began moving towards Pitigliano and other, larger communities with Jews in Central Italy.

During the 20th century, the entire Jewish community abandoned the location. The building was neglected and subsequently abandoned during through the end of the century. In the 21st century, restoration work has been carried out in the building concurrent to the restoration at the Synagogue of Pitigliano. The synagogue has regained recognition and has been used for cultural events in the city. It can be visited by tourists with special permission.

== See also ==
- List of synagogues in Italy
