= Norsa Torrazzo synagogue =

Synagogue in Mantua

- Norsa Torrazzo sinagoga
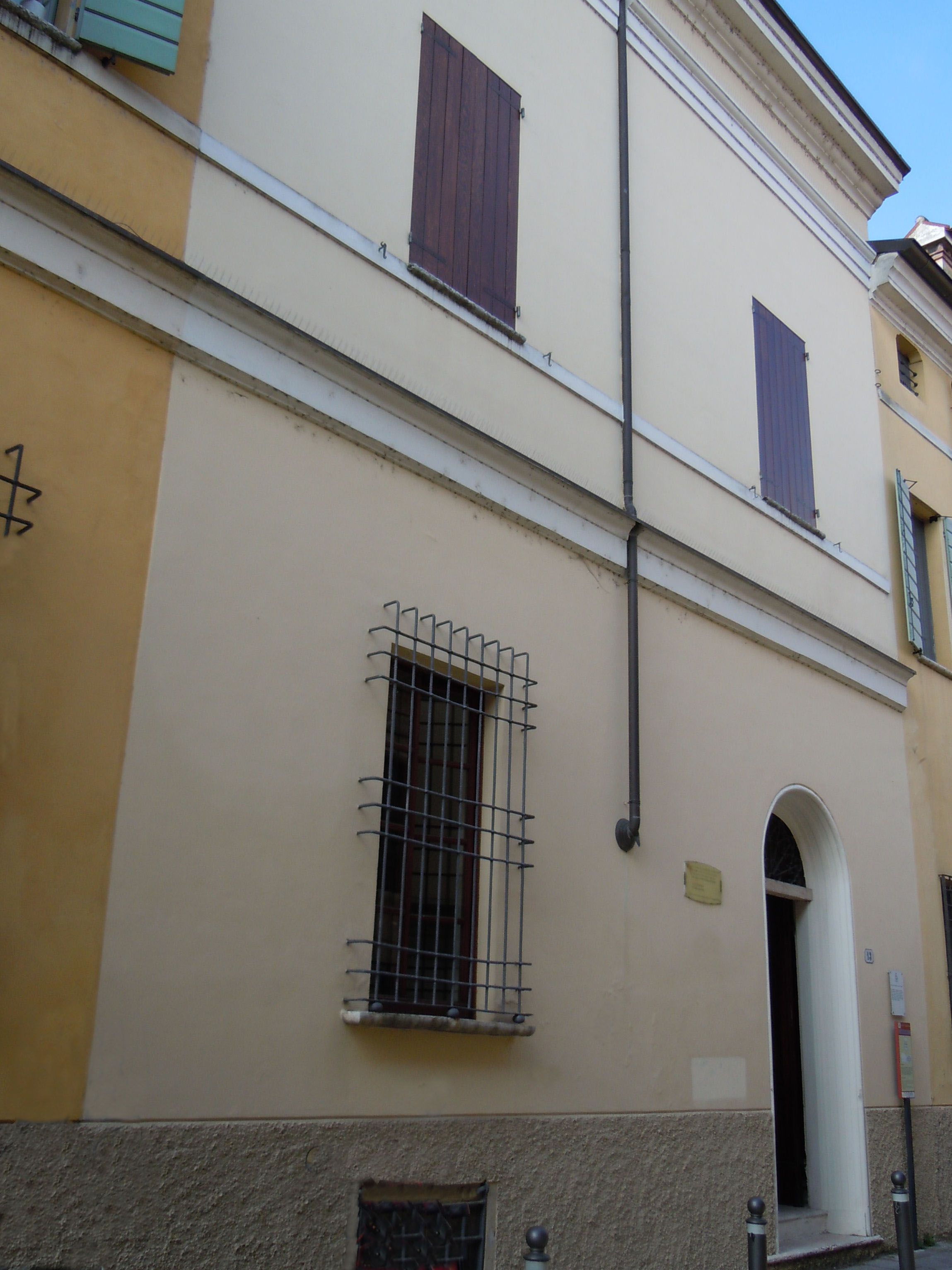

Religion
- Affiliation: Judaism
- Rite: Italian rite

Location
- Location: Via Gilberto Govi 13, Mantua, Italy
- Interactive map of Norsa Torrazzo synagogue
- Coordinates: 45°09′17″N 10°47′42″E

Architecture
- Completed: 1513 (original) 1751 (rebuilt) 1902(transfer & reconstruction)

The Norsa Torrazzo synagogue (Italian: Norsa Torrazzo sinagoga) is a Jewish synagogue located in Mantua, Italy. Although it has moved locations from its original 16th-century spot, it is considered to be a faithful reproduction in terms of interior looks, and has most of its original furnishings, some dating back to the 18th century. It is named for the Norsa and Torrazzo families, who helped fund its construction.

== History ==
The synagogue was originally built in 1513, and was destroyed in 1630, later rebuilt in 1751. The Jewish community of Mantua had six synagogues by the 18th century, three German and three Italian. Following the abolition of the town's Jewish ghetto in 1798, several synagogues became defunct, and only Norsa Torrazzo was transferred and rebuilt piece-by-piece between 1899 and 1902, in a building that was previously a retirement home for Jews as early as 1825. The Norsa Torrazzo synagogue was the only one to survive with the same furnishings, with the rest closing or being demolished and subsequently having their contents transferred to nearby synagogues or to congregations in Israel.

On April 25, 1998, a plaque was placed commemorating 64 Jewish residents of the city deported to concentration camps and exterminated. The top floor of the building is a historical archive that contains documents from 1522 to 1861 and further records to the present-day of the community. They have many books, manuscripts, musical scores, and civil/court records. It is currently a national monument and open to visitors.

== Description ==
The room containing the shul is rectangular, with stuccoed walls, which were casts from the original design that couldn't be detached and re-applied. The casts pay homage to the Norsa family and sometimes contain verses from the Torah. The Torah ark and bema face each other, one on the left side of the entrance, and the other on the right, each placed in their own recess, raised on steps. Both are made of fine carpented wood and are embellished with embroidery. Two rows of pews parallel to each other made of dark wood are located on both sides. Chandeliers hang down from the ceiling, made of wrought iron.

The women's section is located above, connected to the entrance wall and is held up by balustrade columns.

== See also ==
- List of synagogues in Italy
