= Ferrara Synagogue =

Synagogue complex in Ferrara, Italy

- Italian: Sinagoga di Ferrara
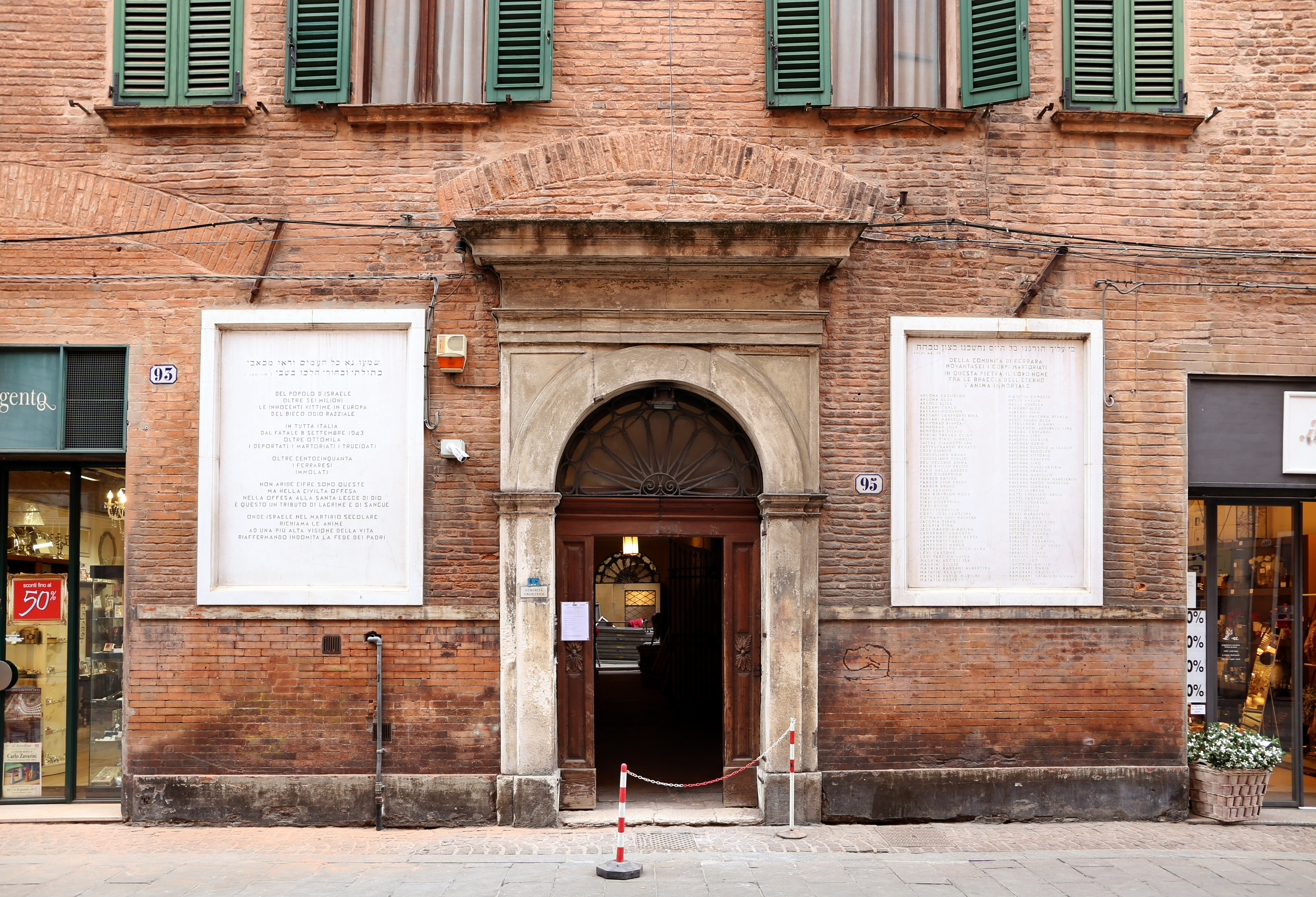
- The synagogue façade, in 2017

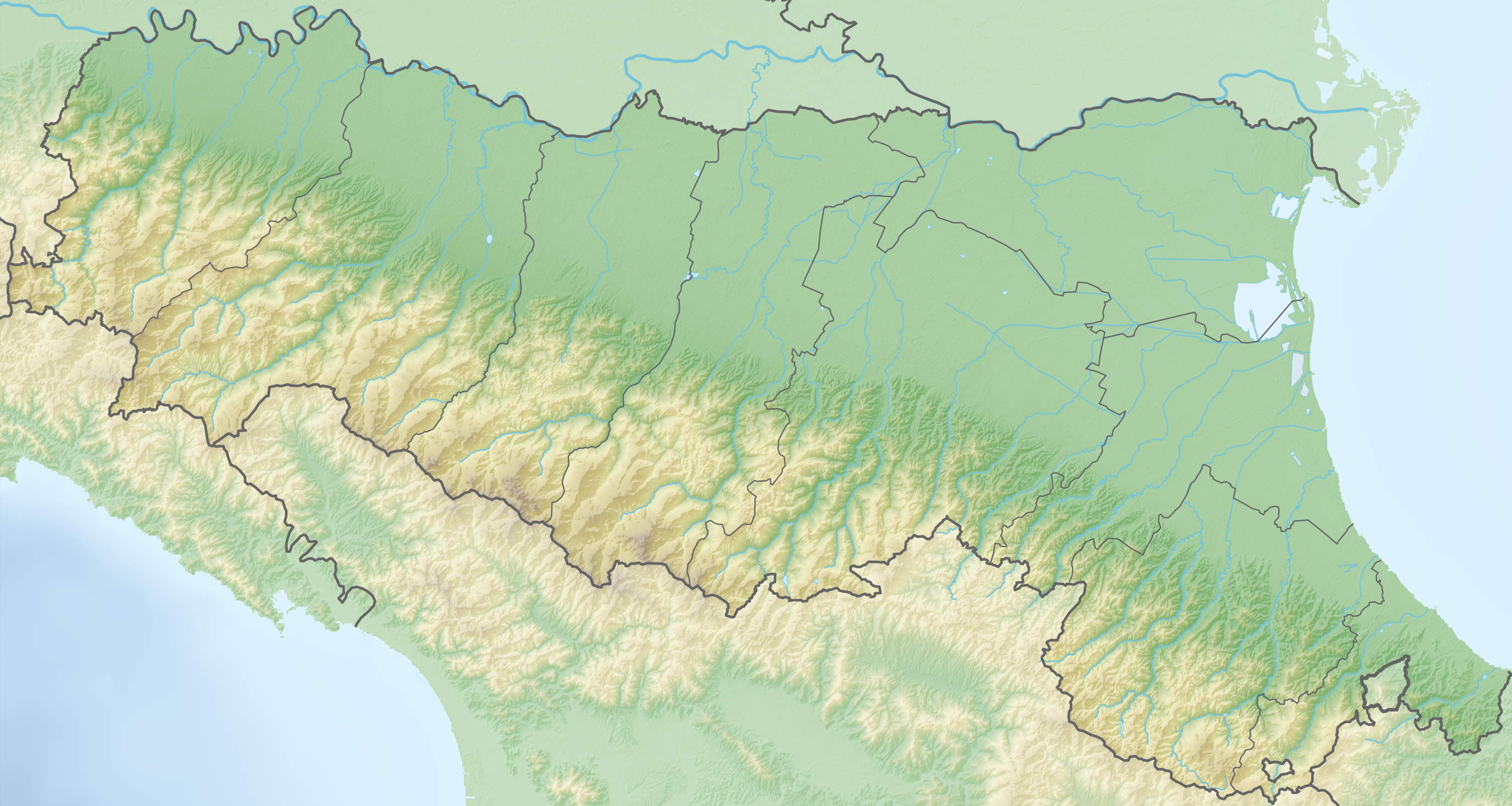
- Location of the synagogue complex in Emilia-Romagna

Religion
- Affiliation: Judaism
- Rite: Italian rite (Scuola Italiana and Scuola Fanese); Nusach Ashkenaz (Scuola Tedesca)
- Ecclesiastical or organisational status: Synagogue; Jewish museum
- Status: Active

Location
- Location: Via Mazzini 95, Ferrara, Emilia-Romagna
- Country: Italy
- Coordinates: 44°50′03″N 11°37′18″E

Architecture
- Type: Synagogue architecture
- Style: Baroque
- Completed: 1485 (Scuola Italiana); 1603 (Scuola Tedesca); 19th century (Scuola Fanese)
- Materials: Brick

Website
- ww3.comune.fe.it

The Ferrara Synagogue (Italian: Sinagoga di Ferrara) is a Jewish congregation and synagogue complex, that is located at Via Mazzini 95, in Ferrara, in Emilia-Romagna, Italy. Designed in the Baroque style, the synagogue complex comprises the Scuola Italiana, completed in 1485 and operated until 1944; the Scuola Tedesca, completed in 1603; and the Scuola Fanese, completed in the 19th century.

The synagogue complex is the only surviving representative of the several synagogues that once flourished in Ferrara. It is located in the historic Jewish community building that dates from 1421, which once housed two other synagogues, destroyed by fascists during World War II. Other synagogues were once located nearby. The building also houses a Jewish museum.

== Synagogue ==
The surviving synagogue, the Scola Tedesca, German Synagogue, is a large room with a women's gallery upstairs. The barrel-vaulted ceiling and walls are decorated in the Regency/Empire style fashionable when the room was renovated in 1820. The plaster designs on the walls are the work of Gaetano Davia, designer of the interior design of the Ferrara City Theater, Teatro Comunale. They feature Jewish motifs such as the Torah ark carried by the Jews during their Exodus from Egypt, and the vestments of the High Priest in the Temple at Jerusalem. The synagogue retains its 18th-century bimah and Torah ark in dark wood, set off by a white marble balustrade.

== Jewish museum ==
The museum displays the Torah Ark of the Scola Italiana, Italian rite synagogue, once located in a large room in the same building. The room, now in use as a lecture hall, retains its original, vaulted, Baroque ceiling. Other furnishing were destroyed in a fascist attack on the building. The museum also displays several Torah arks from former synagogues in small towns in the region.

Among the artifacts are an eighteenth-century contract between a local Jewish family and a newly hired nursemaid in which the nursemaid undertakes not to baptize the Jewish baby, and a stamp used to seal Jewish graves to prevent medical students at the university from using the cadavers for dissection practice.

== See also ==
- History of the Jews in Italy
- List of synagogues in Italy
