= Synagogue of Rovigo =

Synagogue in Veneto

- Sinagoga di Rovigo

Religion
- Affiliation: Judaism

Location
- Location: Via Filippo Corridoni 18, Rovigo, Italy
- Interactive map of Synagogue of Rovigo
- Coordinates: 45.067999°N 11.794328°E

Architecture
- Style: Neoclassical
- Completed: 1858 (original synagogue); 1930 (rebuild)
- Delisted: After WWII

The Synagogue of Rovigo (Italian: Sinagoga di Rovigo) was a Jewish synagogue located in Rovigo, Italy.

== History ==
The Jewish ghetto of Rovigo was established in 1615. In 1629, the synagogue in the city was demolished because it was considered too close to a church. The house of worship varied throughout the centuries, and the location was typically a target for vandalism and rioting wherever it was. The new building was established in the center of the ghetto, and was redone in 1858 with the emancipation that came with the unification of Italy. On November 17, 1861, instrumental music was introduced to its services.

In 1930, the synagogue was demolished. The Jewish section of the city was not in good condition, and much of it was removed to make way for an urban renewal project. It was rebuilt in its current location in 1930 using the furnishings, materials, marbles, and style of the original synagogue in the Neoclassical style.

The Jewish community in Rovigo largely disappeared after WWII, and the building was sold as a private residence. Its furnishings were transferred to a synagogue in Padua (whose Jewish community merged with Rovigo's post-Holocaust), but maintained the exterior design and internal structure. For some time, it was the studio for sculptor Virgilio Milani, and was occasionally used as a venue for cultural events. It is currently under residential use with no indication of cultural restoration in the near future.

== Description ==
The synagogue had a large internal hall with significant monumentality. The interior was illuminated by large windows and ornamented with stuccoes and frescoes.

== See also ==
- List of synagogues in Italy
