= Synagogue of Urbino =

Synagogue in Urbino

- Sinagoga di Urbino
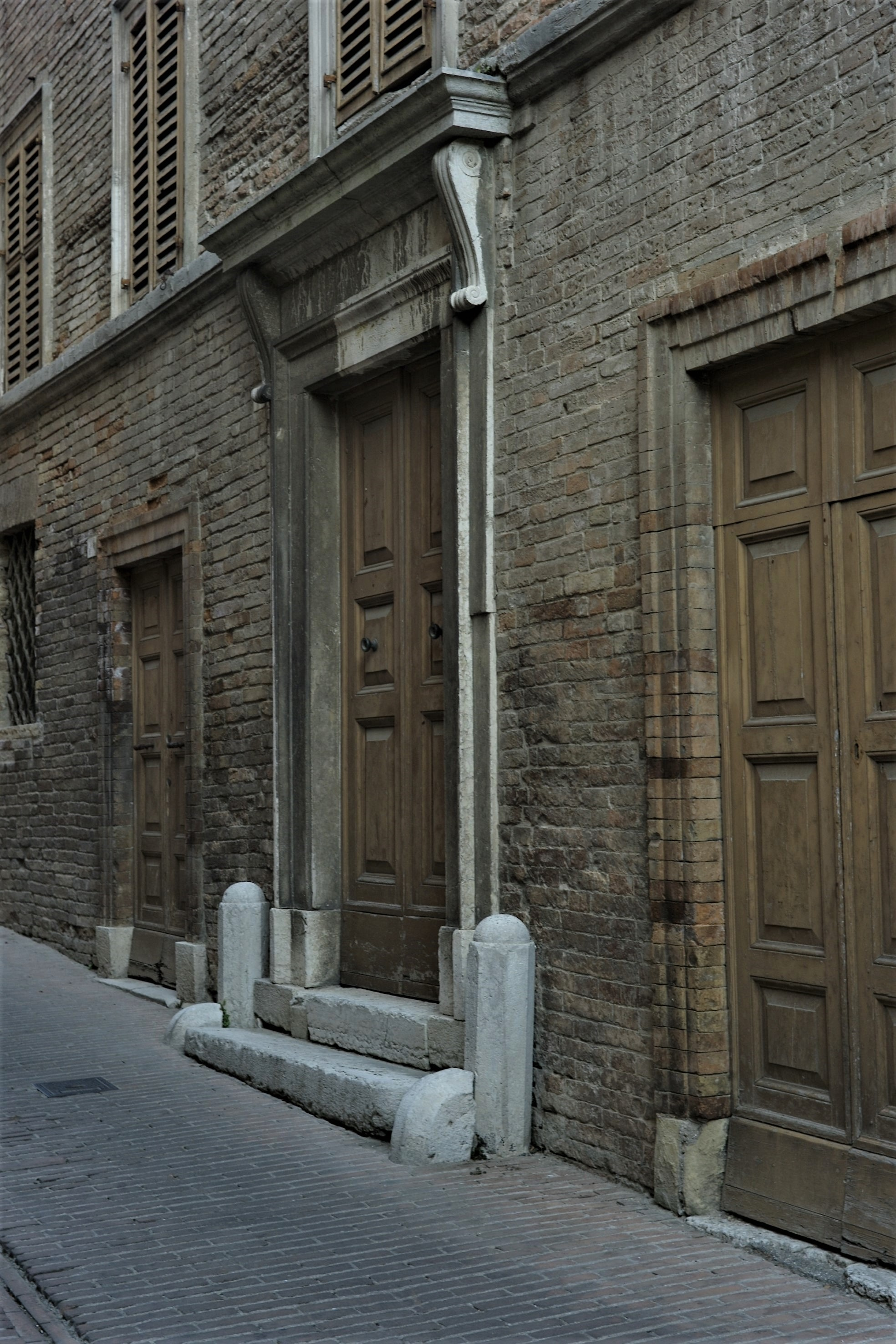
- Facade of the building

Religion
- Affiliation: Judaism
- Rite: Italian rite

Location
- Location: Urbino, Marche, Italy
- Interactive map of Synagogue of Urbino
- Coordinates: 43°43′29″N 12°38′06″E

Architecture
- Style: Inspired by Urbino Cathedral
- Completed: 1633 (built); 1866 (restored)

The Synagogue of Urbino (Italian: Sinagoga di Urbino) is a Jewish synagogue located inside the historic Jewish ghetto in Urbino. It is located on Via Stretta 43.

== History ==
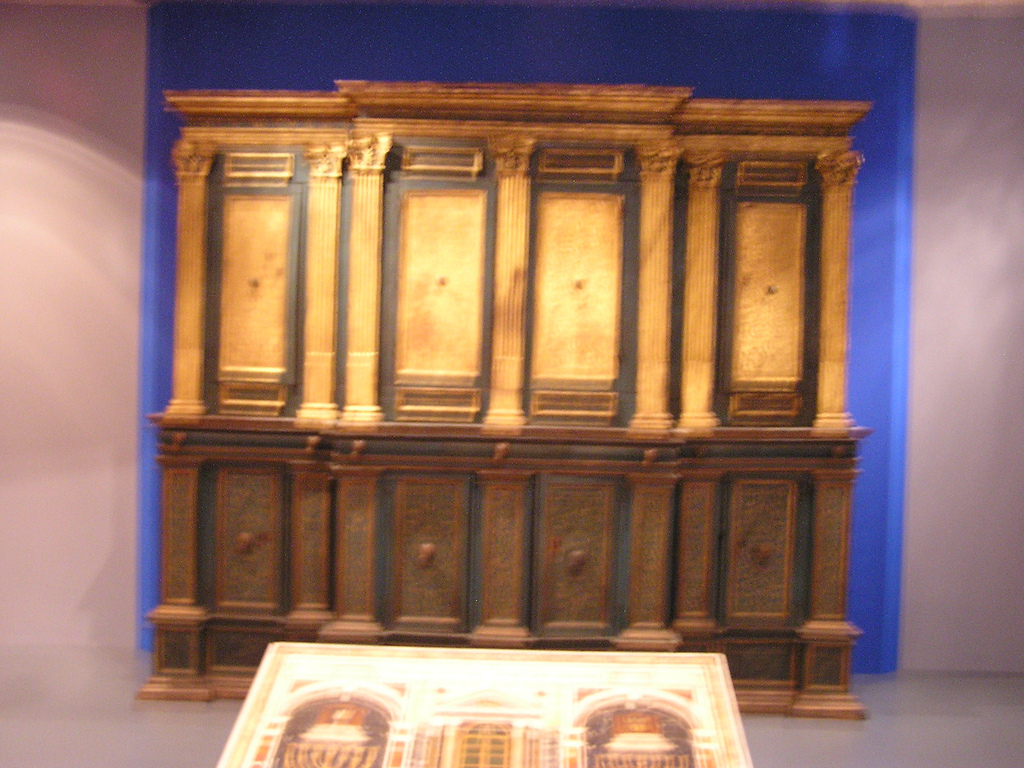
The Torah ark from the original synagogue, currently housed in the Jewish Museum

The synagogue was created with the establishment of the Ghetto, following the transfer of power to the Papal States in 1631. Prior, the city's Jews enjoyed relative tolerance from the Dukes, so much so that the first synagogue (whose building dates back to the 13th century) was located near the Plaza of Duke Federico. The synagogue was built in the Valbona district, with many nearby buildings owned by the Giunchi family, including their palace. Following the Napoleonic occupation, the walls of the Ghetto were torn down, and were not re-erected under independence.

The current synagogue was partially owned by Catholics until 1851, following a decrease in Jewish autonomy following the Restoration. Once Jews regained autonomy in 1866 under the Kingdom of Italy, a renovation of the synagogue went underway. The redesign of the interior was inspired by the renovation of Urbino Cathedral. It has an internal arrangement similar to that of a Catholic chapel, with a single barrel-vaulted hall closed on the northern side by an apse, which is the location of the Torah ark. Molds of rosettes and plant spirals of the decorations from the Cathedral were provided by Archbishop Alessandro Angeloni of Urbino to the Jewish community. They were made by Francesco Antonio Rondelli, and the furnishings were produced by Francesco Pucci, a cabinetmaker from Cagli, which included the bema and the Torah ark. The ark he made replaced the original one, which was unable to fit within the curves of the apse walls, as it dates back to 1451 (and refurbished and painted in 1624). It was possibly a gift from Urbine Dukes, and was sold in 1906 for financial reasons, and is preserved in the Jewish Museum of New York. The cabinet contains Arabesque patterning and is 7'10" tall and 9'2" wide, with a depth of 2'10".

== Description ==
=== Exterior ===
The front of the synagogue (facing the west) is on Via Stretta, which was the main street of the former ghetto. It had three entrances, a main one and two smaller ones on either side. It also has two orders of windows on window sills, adorned in stone frames. The facade is made of exposed brick, excluding the eastern side, which is plastered, and the top of the front, which has rows of stone blocks alternating with rows of bricks. The south side faces the stairs of the theater and has a more elaborate facade, which includes three pilasters ending in Doric capitals.

=== Interior ===
The prayer hall is located in the eastern side, and runs north-south. It is a rectangular room illuminated by a window from the south side, and five smaller lunette windows on the eastern side at the base of the barrel vault. It mirrors the balconies that expose the women's gallery. The northern end of the hall is an apse with the Torah ark, and the opposite side contains the bema. The walls are ornamented with Ionic semi-columns supporting the entablature, which is decorated with the plant spirels and where the barrel vault develops. The apse cap is coffered and decorated with the rosettes. The atrium contains a plaque in Hebrew commemorating the hospitality by the Dukes of Urbino to persecuted Jews. To the right of the prayer hall is the Talmud Torah. Unlike many other synagogues, the ritual bath is located in another building entirely.
