= Synagogue of Gorizia =

Synagogue in Gorizia, Italy

- Sinagoga di Gorizia
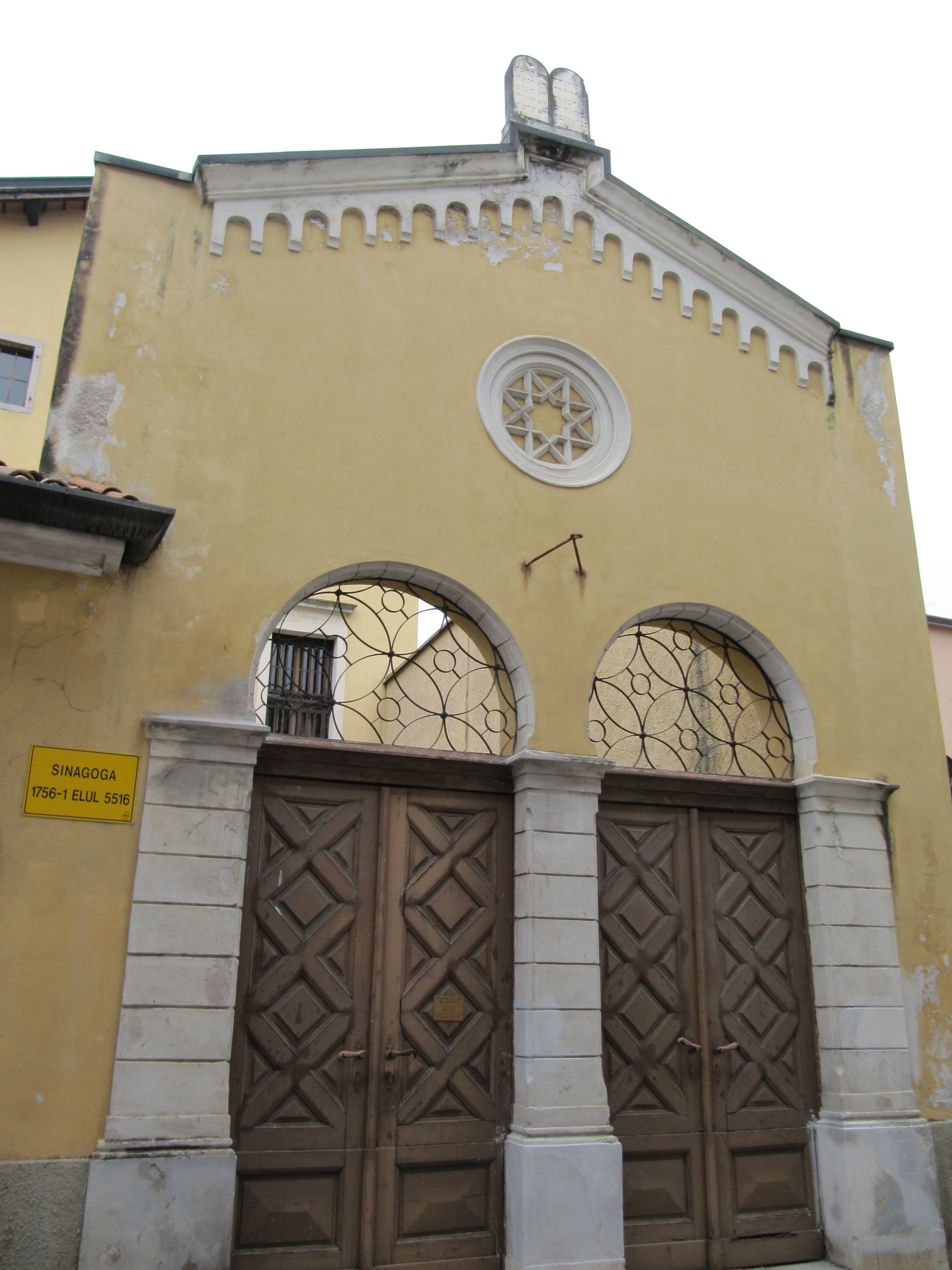
- Front of the synagogue

Religion
- Affiliation: Judaism
- Region: Friuli-Venezia Giulia
- Rite: Ashkenazi
- Ecclesiastical or organizational status: Cultural museum, no longer used for worship

Location
- Location: 13 Via Graziadio Isaia Ascoli
- Country: Italy
- Interactive map of Synagogue of Gorizia
- Coordinates: 45.949167°N 13.625833°E

Architecture
- Style: Baroque
- Completed: 1756

The Synagogue of Gorizia (Italian: Sinagoga di Gorizia) is a Jewish synagogue in Gorizia, Italy.

== History ==
The synagogue is in the area of the city that hcontained the Jewish ghetto. In modern times, it is located on 13 Via Graziadio Isaia Ascoli, a street named for Jewish-Italian linguist Graziadio Isaia Ascoli. It was built in 1756, replacing or enlarging an oratory that was erected on a temporary basis in 1699, set up a year after Jewish confinement to the ghetto. A renovation in 1894 by engineer Emilio Luzatto created the modern entrance to the synagogue in the Moorish style.

Due to the decimated population as a result of the Holocaust, there were few to no Jews for a long time in the city, and most had relocated to Trieste. The Jews were deported in November 1943, and 30 kilograms of gold were seized from the shul property. The building was donated to the municipality and was not open for worship. On April 25, 1972, its interior was vandalized by four teenagers. After falling into disrepair, the synagogue was restored in 1984 with consideration for its original details, although it is not used for worship.

== Description ==
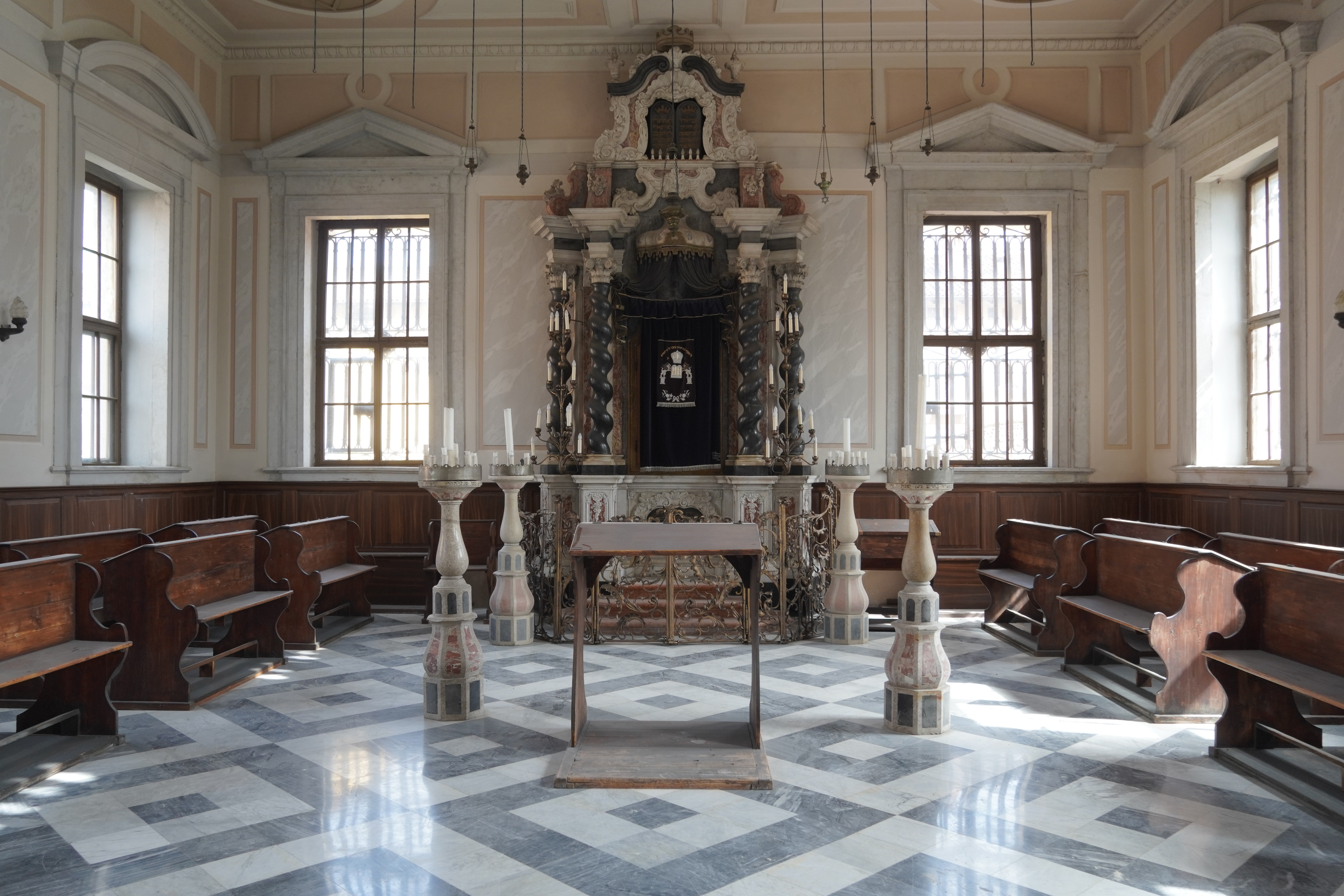
Interior of the synagogue featuring the Torah ark

The synagogue entrance is a double arch with wooden doors symbolizing the two tablets of the Ten Commandments. Above it is an eight-pointed star. The doors lead to a small courtyard. Previously, it was enclosed by the surrounding houses prior to renovation in the late 19th century. The courtyard contains a menorah donated by sculptor Simon Benetton in memory of the Jews deported from Gorizia during the Holocaust. A gate surrounding the building was built in the 18th century by blacksmith Martino Geist.

The ground floor is host to a Jewish museum, and the shul is located on the first floor. The shul contains a wooden women's section on the balcony, and is illuminated by large windows and two wrought iron chandeliers. The Torah ark is designed in the Baroque style, and has four twisted columns made of black marble, and is surrounded by an original gilded balustrade. The head of the room contains a wooden bema, as well as a lectern, four candelabras, and other furnishings of the German rite.

== Museum ==
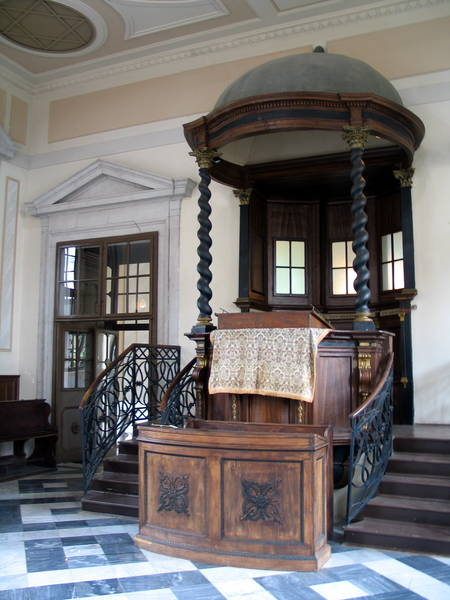
Interior of the synagogue featuring the bema

Since 1998, the ground floor of the building has housed the Jewish museum, Jerusalem on the Isonzo. It tells the history of the Jews from the period of the Israelites to the modern diaspora, and describes its various traditions and rites. A section of the museum is dedicated to the Jewish community of Gorizia and tells the history of medieval Jewish settlement, the birth of the ghetto in the 17th-century, and the participation of Jews in the history of the area up until their deportation. People given feature in the exhibit are: Rabbi Abraham Vita Reggio, Rabbi Isaac Samuel Reggio, linguist Ascoli, journalist Carolina Luzzatto, philosopher Carlo Michelstaedter, writer Enrico Rocca, and painter Vittorio Bolaffio.

Additionally the museum contains the few original objects in the synagogue which were recovered after confiscation by the Nazi-allied regime during WWII. Many paintings by Michelstaedter are also on display. Temporary exhibitions are held throughout the year in honor of Holocaust Remembrance Day, European Day of Jewish Culture, and the anniversary of the deportation of the Jews from Gorizia on November 23, 1943.

== See also ==
- List of synagogues in Italy
