= Viareggio Synagogue =

Synagogue in Viareggio, Italy

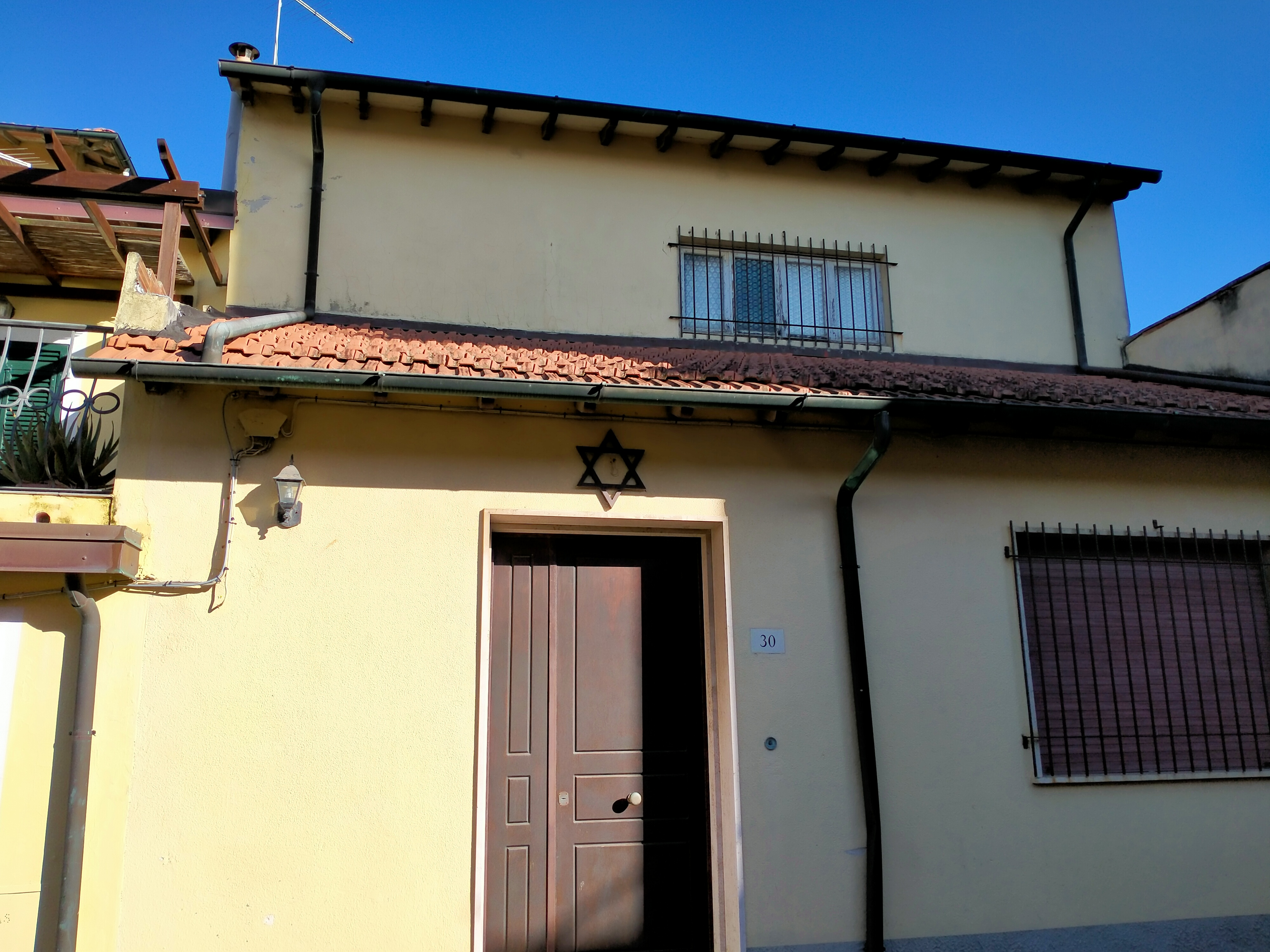
- The synagogue, in 2021

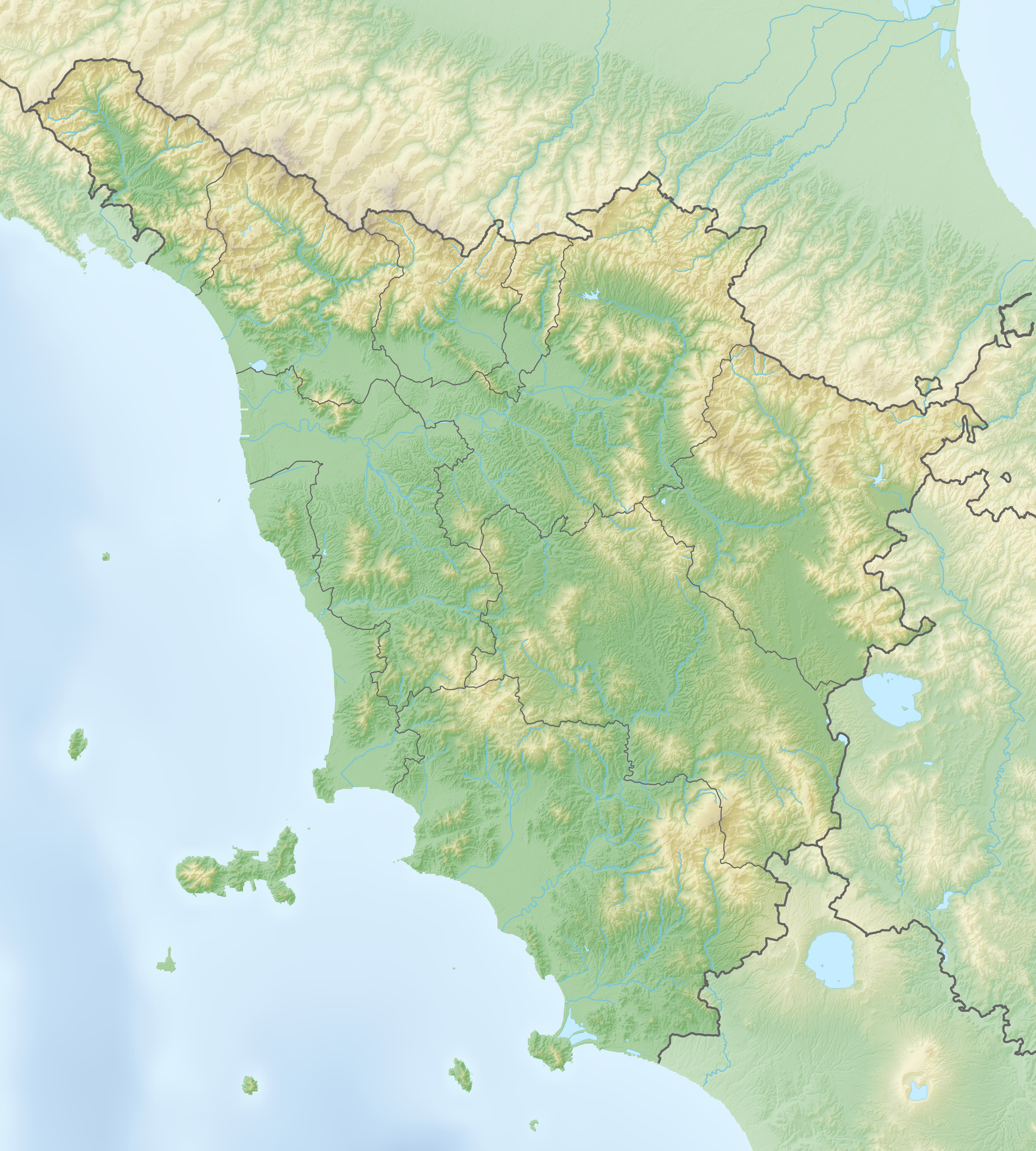
- Location of the synagogue in Tuscany

Religion
- Affiliation: Judaism
- Ecclesiastical or organizational status: Synagogue
- Ownership: Jewish Community of Pisa
- Status: Active

Location
- Location: via delgi Oleandri 30 (30 Oleander Lane), in Viareggio, Province of Lucca, Tuscany
- Country: Italy
- Interactive map of Viareggio Synagogue
- Coordinates: 43°52′39″N 10°14′48″E

Architecture
- Type: Synagogue architecture
- Completed: 1955
- Materials: Brick

The Viareggio Synagogue is a Jewish congregation and synagogue, located at via delgi Oleandri 30 (30 Oleander Lane), in Viareggio, in the Province of Lucca, Tuscany, Italy. The congregation is administered by the Jewish Community of Pisa.

== History ==
Between the end of the 19th century and the start of the 20th century, many Jewish families moved to Viareggio, mostly from nearby Leghorn. The scrolls of the Sefer Torah, still preserved in the synagogue at via degli Oleandri, date from that period.

In the 1930s the congregation, made up of 52 families, rented a location in Viareggio's via Fratti, to be set up as a centre for worship. Here, in 1940, following the Fascist race laws, a Jewish school was opened as well. With the Nazi occupation in 1943, the school and synagogue ceased to exist.

Only in 1955 was the current synagogue opened, thanks to various private donations.

In Viareggio there is also a small Jewish cemetery.

== See also ==
- History of the Jews in Italy
- List of synagogues in Italy
