= Maariv Aravim =

Jewish evening prayer

HaMaariv Aravim, or simply Maariv Aravim, is the first blessing before the Shema and generally the opening prayer during Maariv. It is considered to be the parallel prayer to Yotzer ohr, which is recited in the same place at Shacharit. Just as Yotzer Ohr speaks of the coming of light, HaMaariv Aravim speaks of the coming of darkness.

HaMaariv Aravim and Ahavat Olam being recited at the beginning of Maariv is seen as a preparation for the recitation of the Shema in the form of an affirmation of unity.

== Theme ==
HaMaariv Aravim is a praise of God for bringing on the darkness, controlling the day and night, for ordering the stars in heaven, and for the seasons.

== Time of recitation ==
While it is preferable to recite Maariv after dusk, it is permissible to recite this blessing any time after plag hamincha, even if dusk has not occurred yet. When maariv is recited early, the three chapters of Shema must be recited after nightfall.

== Alternative version for Sabbath ==
In the Italian rite (based on the Siddur of Rav Saadya Gaon), there is an alternative version of this blessing for the Sabbath, beginning with "asher kilah".
