= Synagogue of Ostiano =

Former Italian synagogue

Ostiano Synagogue
- Ex sinagoga di Ostiano

Religion
- Affiliation: Judaism
- Region: Lombardy
- Ecclesiastical or organizational status: No longer active

Location
- Location: Piazza Garibaldi 5, Ostiano
- Country: Italy
- Interactive map of Ostiano Synagogue
- Coordinates: 45°13′12″N 10°14′55″E

Architecture
- Completed: c. 1619; 1713 (restoration)

The Synagogue of Ostiano (Italian: Ex sinagoga di Ostiano) was a Jewish synagogue located in the town of Ostiano in the Province of Cremona. Located in the inner courtyard of the House of Gonzaga, it is currently abandoned and neglected.

== History ==
The building dates to the 16th century, and was the governor's house in the courtyard for the House of Gonzaga's castle. In 1619, Francesco Conzaga, Marquis of Ostiano and Bishop of Mantua, divided the property between the parish of the town and the Franciscan convent of Saints Gaudenzio and Alessandro. In 1713, the Jewish community acquired the building. They updated the building and worked on its embellishments. They also raised another floor to accommodate the synagogue and the women's section. It served as the synagogue for the community for more than two centuries.

The Jewish community dwindled in population due to emigration outwards to large Italian cities. The synagogue was closed at the beginning of the 20th century. Its furnishings were dispersed to other congregations, and the building became privately owned, falling into abandonment after WWII.

On February 3, 2006, the roof of the building collapsed under the weight of a recent heavy snowfall. The wall decorations and stucco dating back to the 16th-century were damaged heavily. In 2008, the municipality purchased the property and started the procedures for recovery and restoration of the building. In its current state, the Center for Jewish Art lists the conservation status of the building to be C status, indicating a poor level of maintenance.

== Description ==
The prayer room is a rectangular, vaulted room illuminated by three large windows, all facing south. The Torah ark was placed in a niche at the front. On the lower floors, the rooms, dating back to the 16th century, hosted community services.

== See also ==
- List of synagogues in Italy
