= Ramaglianti Road Synagogue =

Former synagogue in Florence

- Sinagoga di via de' Ramaglianti
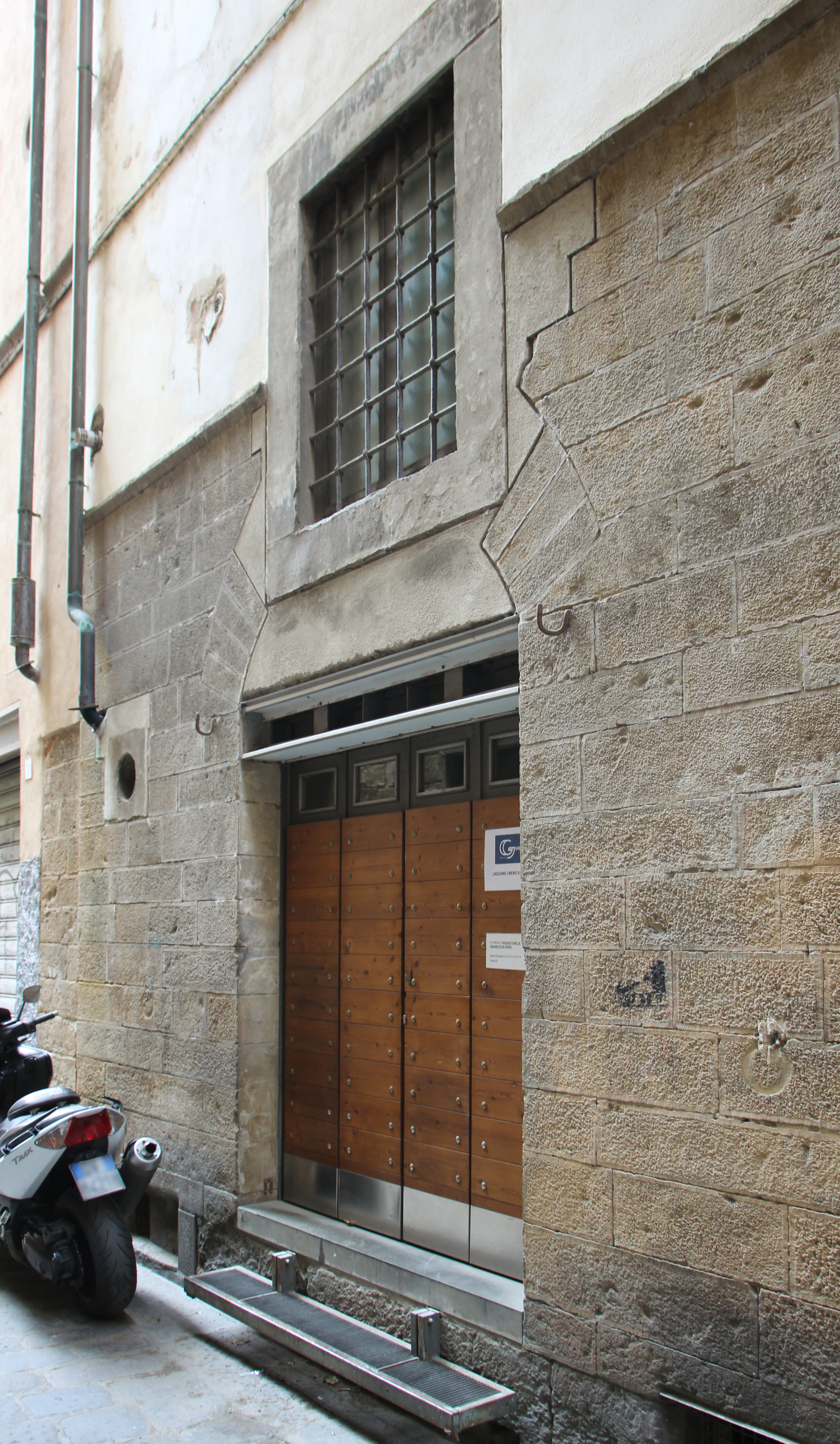
- Entrance to the former synagogue

Religion
- Affiliation: Judaism
- Region: Tuscany
- Ecclesiastical or organizational status: No longer active

Location
- Location: Via de Ramaglianti, Florence
- Country: Italy
- Interactive map of Ramaglianti Road Synagogue
- Coordinates: 43°46′04″N 11°15′05″E

Architecture
- Completed: 1437
- Destroyed: 1944

There was a synagogue on Via Ramaglianti (Italian: Sinagoga di via de' Ramaglianti) in the city of Florence. It is located in the Oltrarno district on the intersection of Via de Ramaglianti and Borgo San Iacopo.

== History ==
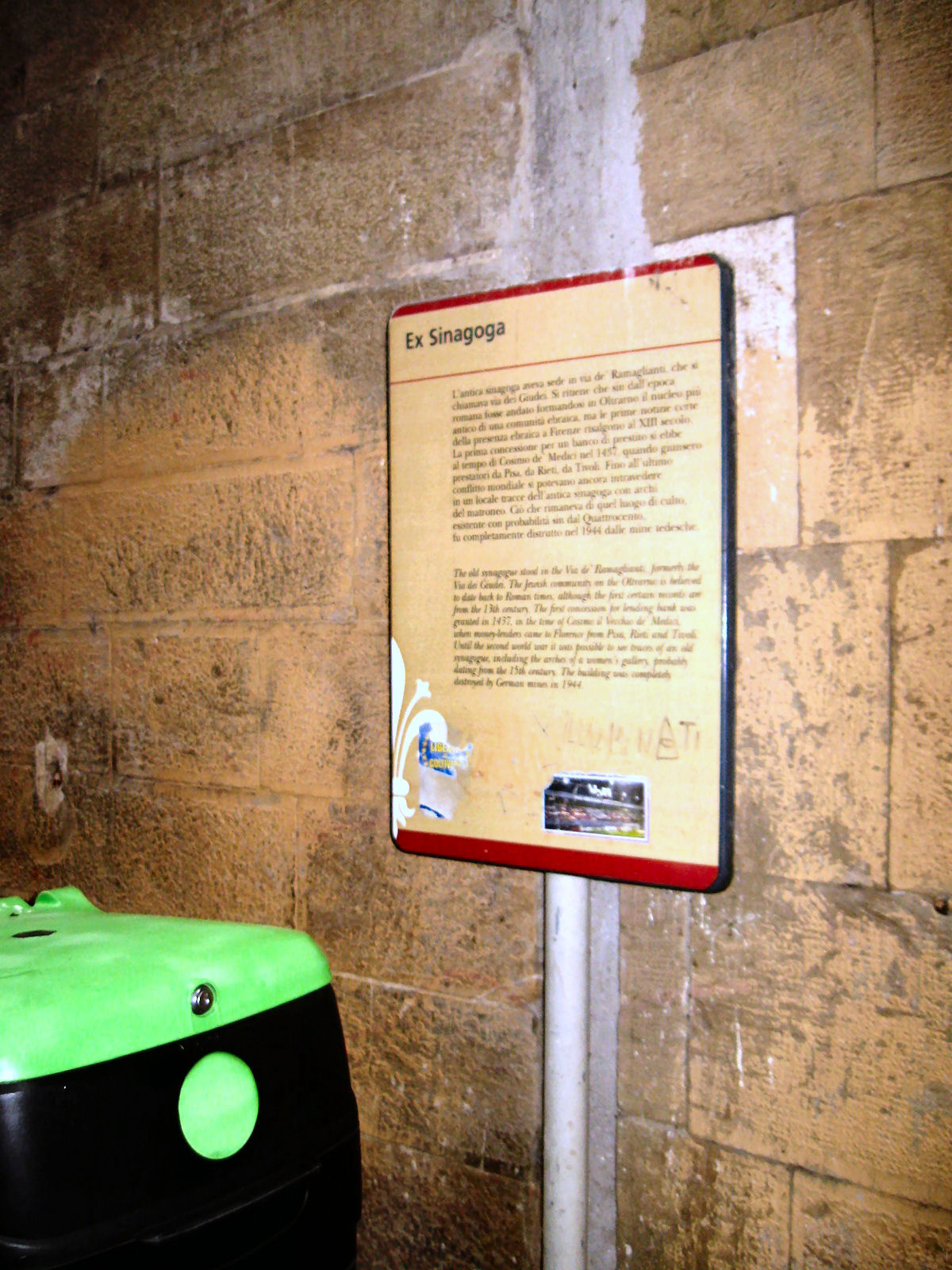
Informational marker about the synagogue at its location

The Medieval synagogue is located on Via de' Ramaglianti (then called Chiasso dei Giudei). According to tradition, since the Roman period, the oldest center of a Jewish community in Florence was located in the Oltrarno district, which dates back to the 13th century. In 1437, a bank loan was taken under Cosimo de' Medici for the synagogue. Medici was partially responsible for the planning of the Jewish ghetto in the city. It is at least attested to by 1456.

In 1848, with the closure of the ghetto, the two synagogues became defunct and their contents were transferred to the Via delle Oche Synagogues. Prior to World War II, the synagogue was dilapidated, but still visible. Arches of the women's section were still present, along with some other parts of the building. In 1944, the synagogue was entirely destroyed by German bombings.

== Description ==
The garden of the synagogue housed the cemetery for the Jews during the 15th century.

It is well-known that a synagogue was located at the address, but few details about its interior are available.

== See also ==
- List of synagogues in Italy
