= Synagogue of Moncalvo =

Synagogue in Piedmont

- Sinagoga di Moncalvo
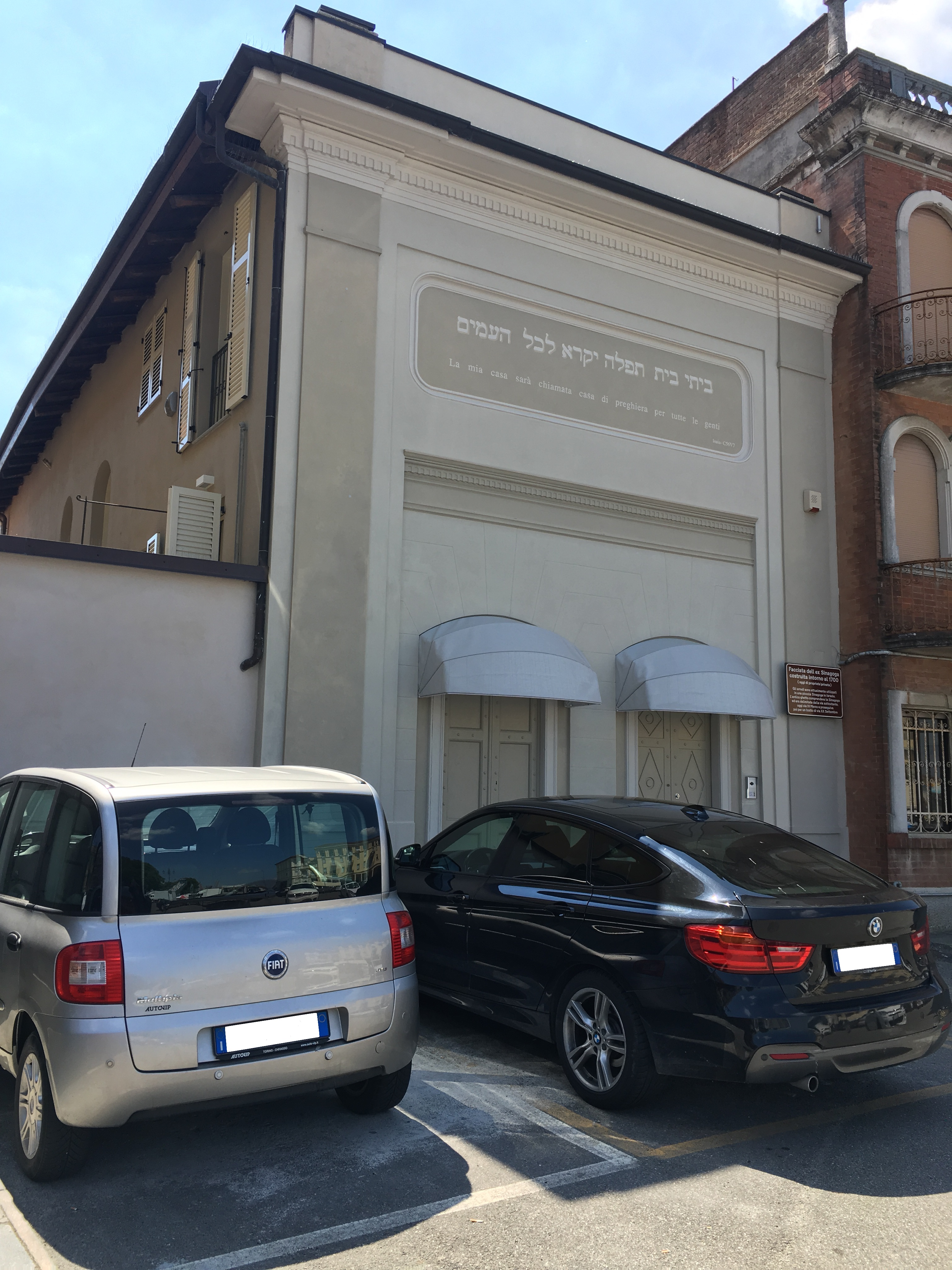
- The restored synagogue in 2018

Religion
- Affiliation: Judaism
- Rite: Italian Rite
- Ecclesiastical or organizational status: Abandoned
- Ownership: Bergagna family (since 1962)

Location
- Location: Piazza Carlo Alberto, 29, Moncalvo, Italy 14036
- Interactive map of Synagogue of Moncalvo
- Coordinates: 45°03′03″N 8°15′56″E

Architecture
- Established: 1732 1860 (additions) 2014 (restoration)

The Synagogue of Moncalvo (Italian: Sinagoga di Moncalvo) is a now-abandoned synagogue located on the Piazza Carlo Alberto in Moncalvo, Piedmont.

== History ==
The Jewish ghetto of Moncalvo was established in 1732, and a synagogue was subsequently built in its boundaries. It did not include any external identifying features and was only accessible via the Jewish neighborhood. Following the 1848 revolution and expanded rights for Jews, the synagogue finalized a façade in 1860, overlooking Piazza Carlo Alberto.

Following a decline of the Jewish population in Italy, the synagogue was closed in 1939 and converted into a warehouse. Its wooden ceiling and its 18th-century Torah ark were transferred to the Italian synagogue in Ramat Gan. Additionally, two small, brass Torah crowns (unusual, as they are typically silver) that come from the synagogue date to 1858.

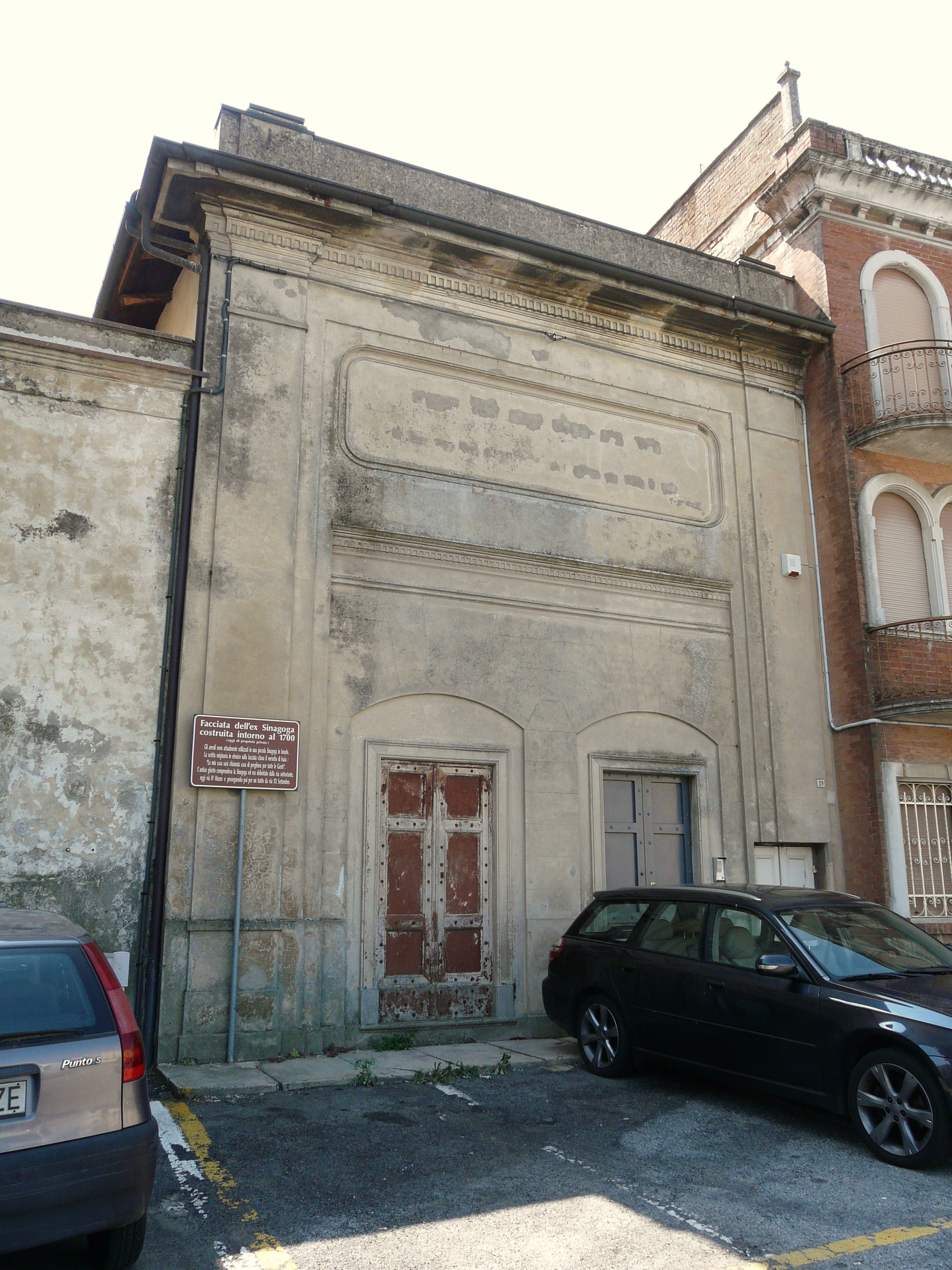
Synagogue prior to restoration

In 2014, its façade was restored by the Bergagna family, who purchased the building in 1962. In 2016, further work was done, this time on the scaffolding for general building maintenance.

== Description ==
Its 18th-century Torah ark was transferred to Ovaida Temple Ramat Gan by Italian-Jewish emigrants making aliyah. It is wooden with golden accents and doric marble columns.

Its exterior is simple and consists of two symmetrical columns, with a Hebrew inscription of Isaiah 56:7 in between at the top, reading "for My house shall be called a house of prayer for all nations." As a synagogue in Europe, it is notable for being located in the main square of its town.
