= Synagogue of Verona =

Synagogue in Verona

- Sinagoga di Verona
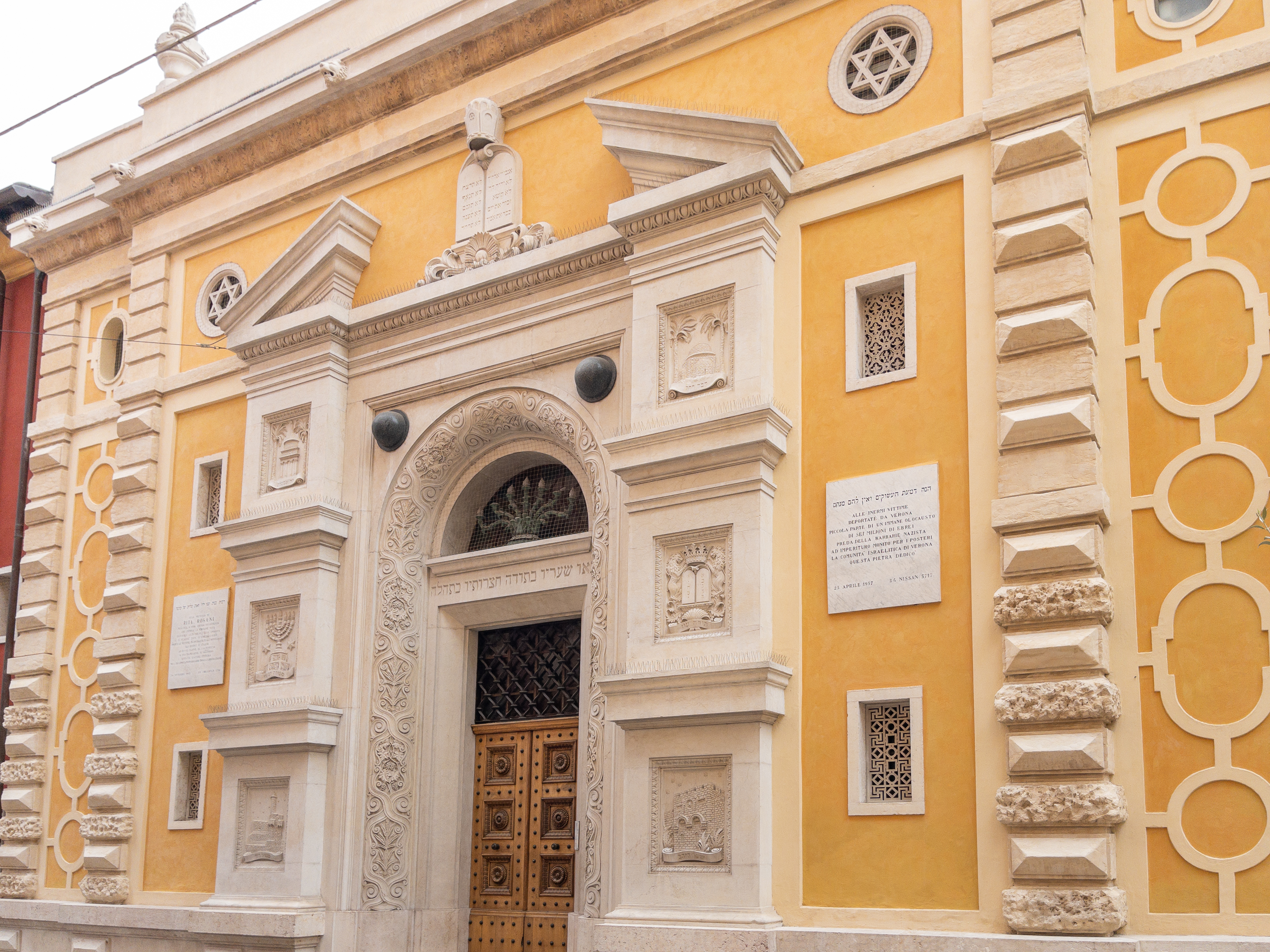

Religion
- Affiliation: Judaism
- Rite: Ashkenazic rite

Location
- Location: Verona, Italy
- Interactive map of Synagogue of Verona
- Coordinates: 45°26′32″N 10°59′49″E

Architecture
- Architect: Giacomo Franco
- Style: Neoclassical
- Creator: Ettore Fagiuoli
- Groundbreaking: 1864
- Completed: September 20, 1929
- Capacity: 1,400

The Synagogue of Verona (Italian: Sinagoga di Verona) is a Jewish synagogue located in the historic center of Verona, not far from the Piazza delle Erbe, the location of the historic Jewish ghetto. It contains many original furnishings and decorations. It is located on Via Portici 3.

== History ==
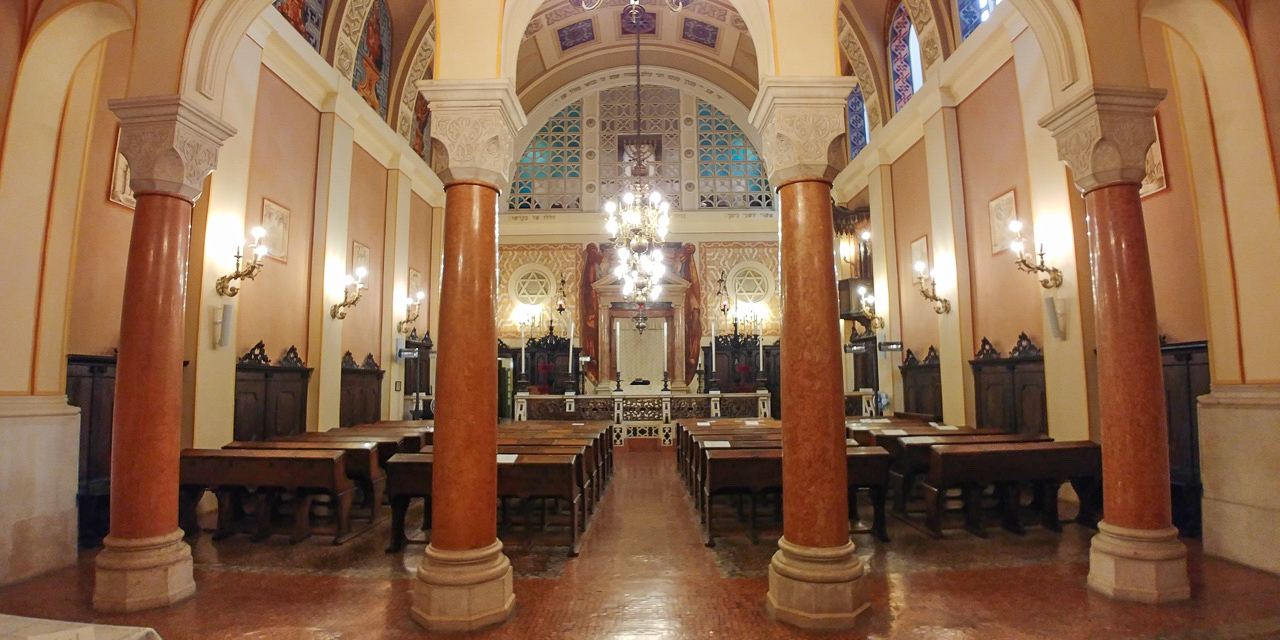
Interior of the synagogue

Historically, Jews are attested in Verona since the 10th century, and were officially allowed to settle in the 15th century. The Jews lived in a ghetto in the city for centuries, and a synagogue was located there until the late 19th century. It was, however, not large enough for the growing community, and a new one was designed to hold up to 1,400 people. It was designed by architect Giacomo Franco on behalf of Rabbi Pardo. Construction began in 1864, but was halted due to financial constraints. It was later completed as a modified project under Ettore Fagiuoli in the 20th century. It was raised through the construction of a barrel vault and the facade that completed in the neoclassical style. It was inaugurated on September 20, 1929.

The left-side of the front of the building hosts a golden plaque dedicated to Rita Rosani, a Jewish partisan killed in 1944 in the Veronese mountains and posthumously awarded the Gold Medal of Military Valor. Its back wall contains a red marble Torah ark dating back to 1645, presumable from an old Sephardic oratory. The women's section is supported by red marble columns and is placed along the entrance wall to the hall.
