= Synagogue of Pitigliano =

Synagogue in Pitigliano, Italy

- Sinagoga di Pitigliano
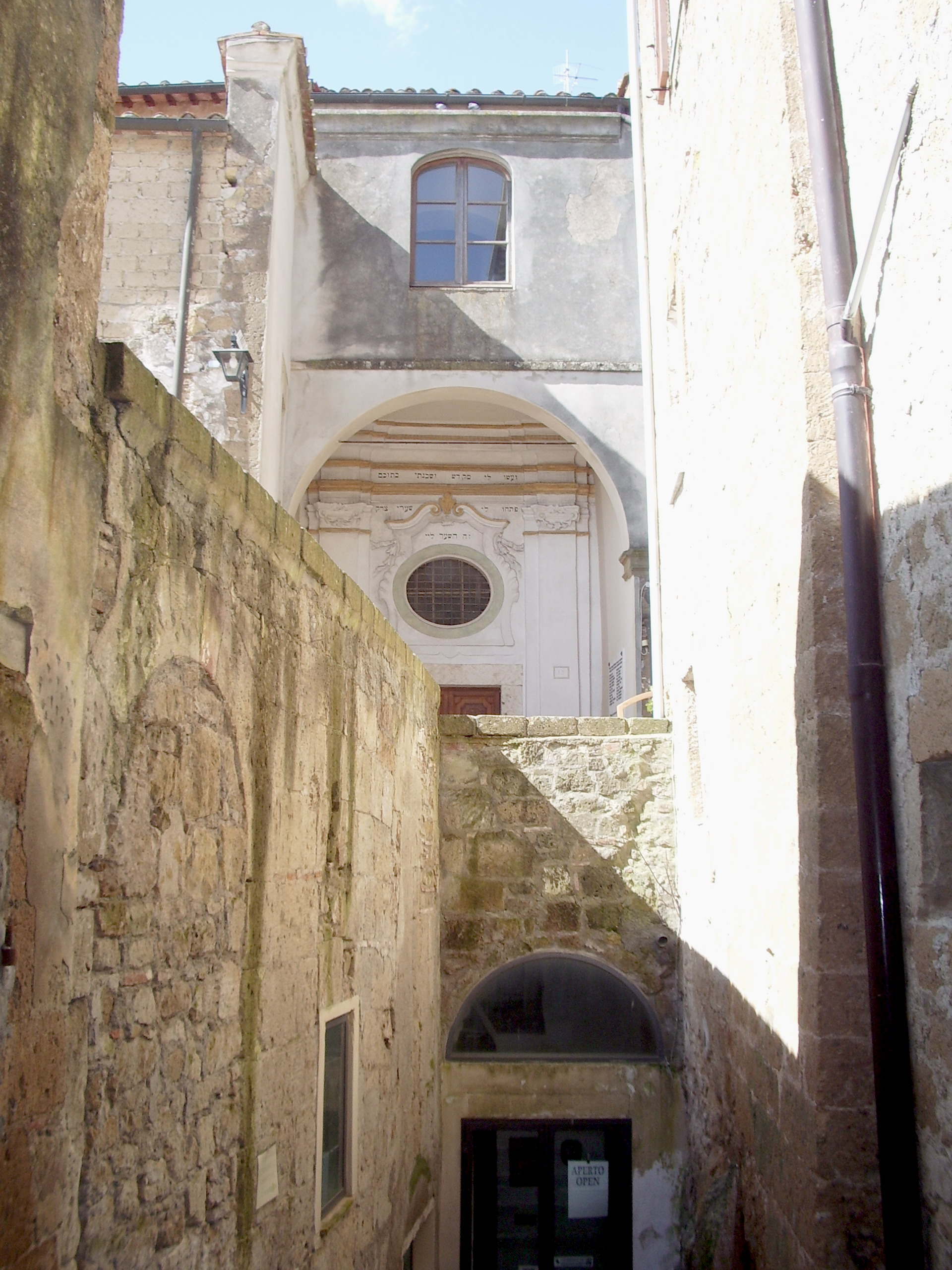
- Entrance to the building

Religion
- Affiliation: Judaism
- Region: Tuscany
- Rite: Spanish rite

Location
- Location: Pitigliano
- Interactive map of Synagogue of Pitigliano
- Coordinates: 42°38′01″N 11°39′58″E

Architecture
- Style: Romanesque
- Completed: 1598

The Synagogue of Pitigliano (Italian: Sinagoga di Pitigliano) is a Jewish synagogue located in Pitigliano, Italy.

== History ==
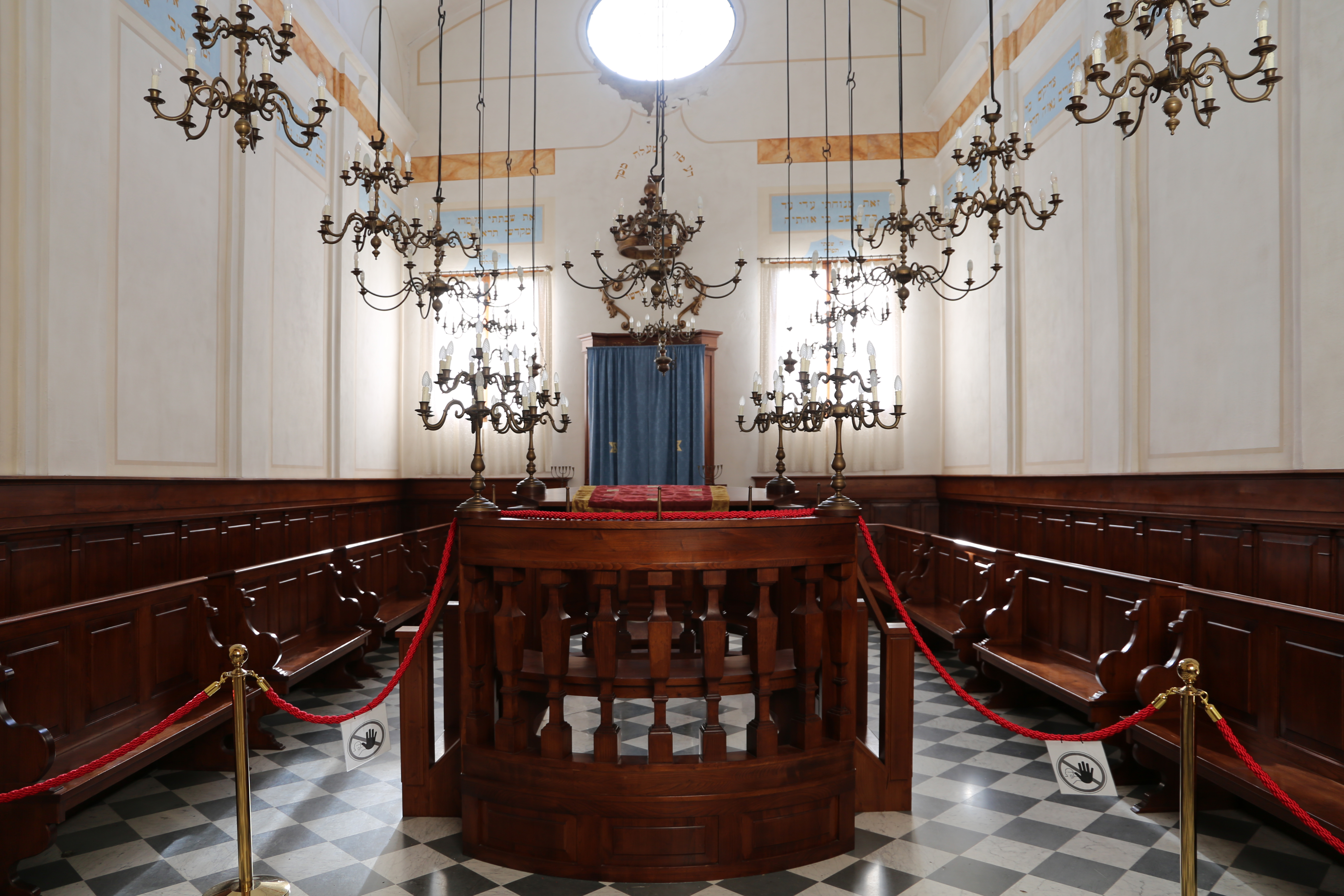
Photograph of interior with lecturn and Torah ark

The Jewish settlement in the city began in the mid-16th century under protection of the Orsini family. the current synagogue was built in 1598 with contributions from Jewish resident Leone di Sabato, a weaver. It is located in the historic Jewish quarter of the city, which is characterized by its narrow alleys.

The synagogue entrance is under a large arch, which leads to a small courtyard. A plaque inside attributes the creation of the synagogue to Judah son of Shabtai. There is an inscription on the front door that says:

Italian: E facciano per me un Santuario ed io abiterò in mezzo ad essi. Aprite per me le porte della giustizia. Questa è la porta [che conduce] al Signore.
English: And they shall make Me a sanctuary and I will dwell in their midst. (Reference to Exodus 25:8) Open for me the gates of righteousness. This is the Lord's gate. (Reference to Psalm 118:19–20)

Additionally, there are plaques commemorating visits by Grand Dukes Ferdinand III in 1823 and Leopold II in 1829, and one by Leopold II (later the Holy Roman Emperor) in 1773. Other than those plaques, the internal furnishings, the arch, and the stairway leading to the women's section, most aspects of the synagogue are not fully original and were part of later restorations.

The temple contains furnishings dating back mostly to the 16th and 17th centuries. It has been restored many times, including in 1756 (after a roof collapse), in 1835 when the facade was decorated with Rococo stuccoes, and in 1931. Due to declining use resulting from a dropping Jewish population, it was closed in 1956. It hadn't been in much use since 1948, when its Torah ark was sent to Israel (currently located in the synagogue in Carmiel). It was later damaged in a landslide that decade, and sat vacant until its renovation by the municipality, finishing in 1995 after nearly 10 years of construction.

The synagogue and its adjacent museum are open for visitors on all days except for the Sabbath. It is not used very often due to an inability to get a minyan. An 18th-century Hannukiah from the synagogue is on display in the Italian Synagogue in Jerusalem. The archives of the Jewish University were found in the rubble of the synagogue in the mid-20th century, and are currently held at the Roman headquarters for the Union of Italian Jewish Communities.

== See also ==
- List of synagogues in Italy
