= Synagogue of Savoca =

Synagogue in Savoca

- Sinagoga di Savoca
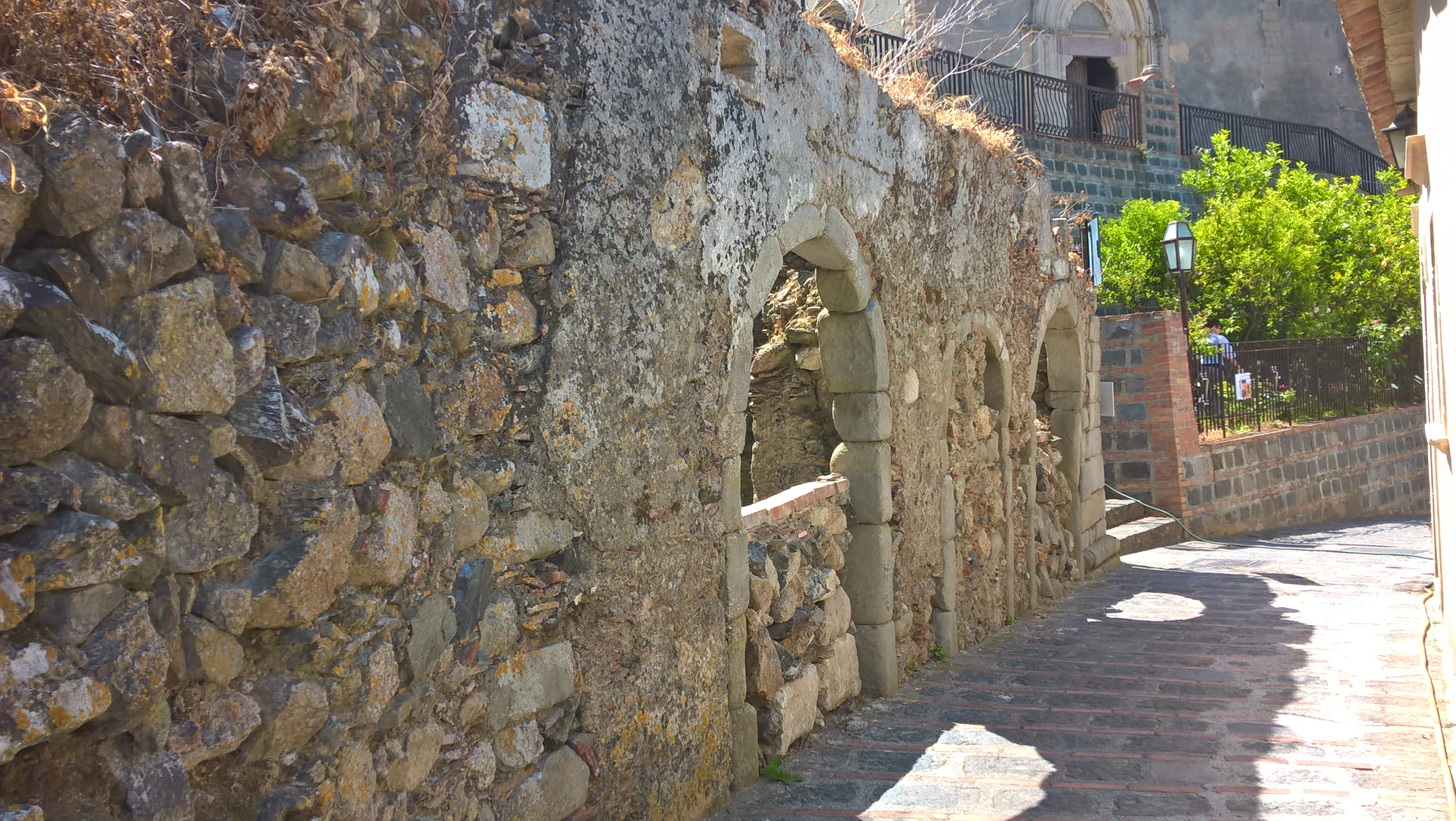
- Exterior of building

Religion
- Affiliation: Judaism

Location
- Interactive map of Synagogue of Savoca
- Coordinates: 37.953851°N 15.340170°E

Architecture
- Completed: Before 1408

The Synagogue of Savoca (Italian: Sinagoga di Savoca) was a Jewish synagogue in Savoca, Italy.

== History ==
The location of the synagogue was established a few steps from the Church of San Michele and the Curia Plaza, which is now the employment office, on the slopes of the hill by the Pentefur Castle. The year of construction is not precisely known, but it was extant by the year 1408.

It was located in a Catholic-inhabited district, and problems arose due to it being too close to churches and residences of nobles. In August 1470, it was confiscated by Viceroy of Sicily Lope Ximénez de Urrea y de Bardaixi, who ordered that a place of worship for the Jews must be built elsewhere in a more central and "better" part of the city. Complaints alleged that the congregation sung hymns on Shabbat that were loud enough to disturb neighboring residences. The building was sold by the Viceroy to a Christian man, Fulippu Sturiali. Sturiali (Italian: Filippo Sturiale), was ordered to pay the Jewish community 1/4th of the property value and transfer a plot of land that the Jews could then have a synagogue on.

Subsequently, Sturiali transformed the building into a residence, although it is not known where the next synagogue was built. In 1492, Jews were banished from the Kingdom of Sicily and the synagogue location remained a private residence. In the 20th century, it was used as a stable, and fell out of use after a roof collapse.

In modern times, the building has been subject to much research. In 1997, the cistern rain catcher used for ritual washing was discovered. In 2014, a plaque with the Star of David was discovered in the synagogue's ruins. On August 7 of that year, Chief Rabbi of Syracuse Stefano Di Mauro led a visit by a group of experts to the location, and the Shofar was blown. On January 29, 2016, the Superintendent for Cultural Heritage in Messina approved a project for restoration of the building to improve conditions there.

== Description and status ==
The synagogue building is in poor condition. It is neglected, and has overgrowth of brushwood and alluvium in the cistern. Two stone arches are visible from the front, and a sandstone window is visible from the side in better condition. Cornerstone ashlars conncet the front wall to the western wall.

== See also ==
- List of synagogues in Italy

== Sources ==
- Lombardo, Santo (2006). La presenza ebraica nella Terra di Savoca e dintorni (in Italian). Comune di Savoca.
