= Italian Nusach =

Religious liturgy of the Italian Jews

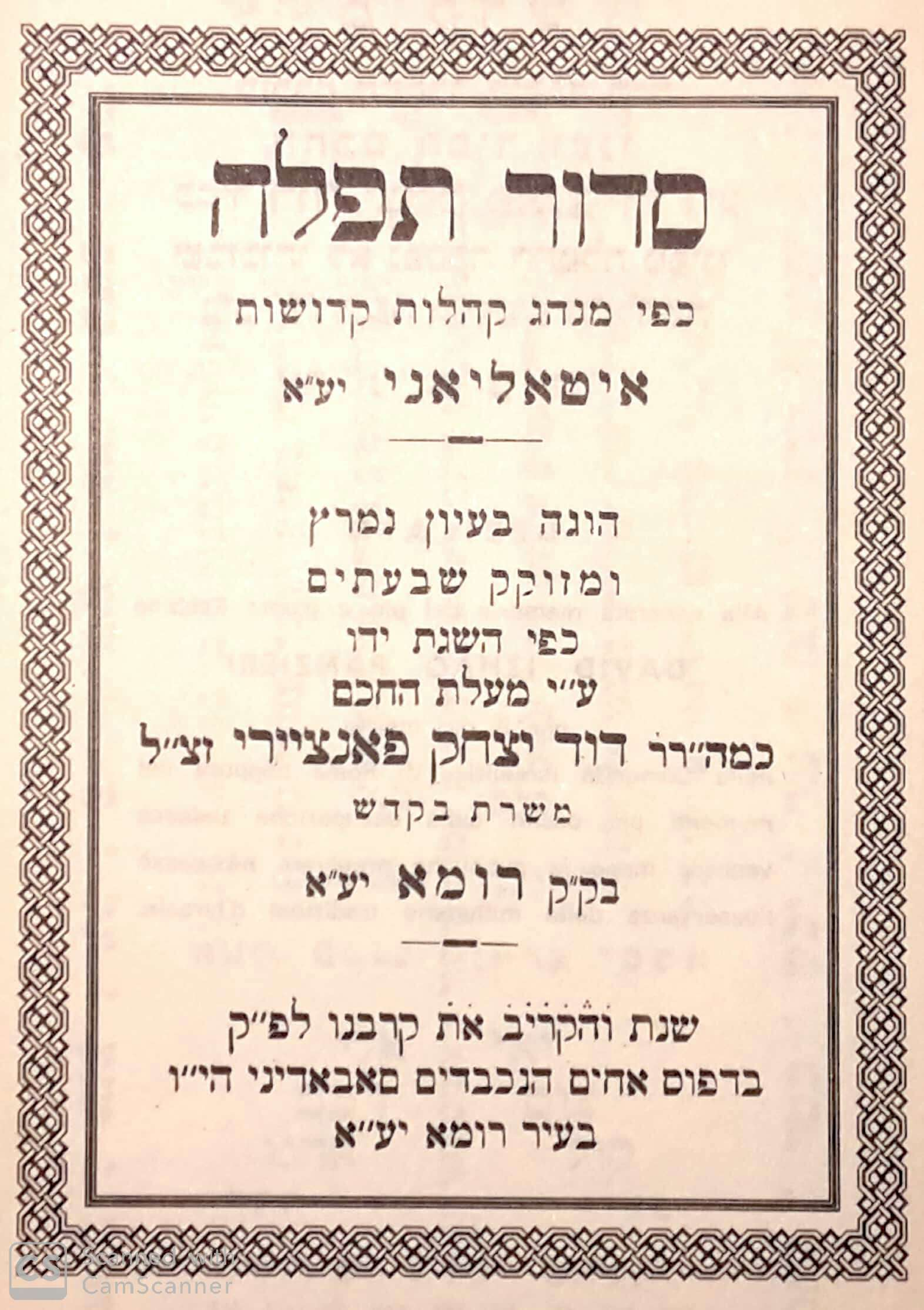
Title page of Machzor Shadal, an Italian Machzor from the mid-19th century (סידור איטליני)

The Italian Nusach (Note: Hebrew: נוסח איטליה nusach ʾitalyah or נוסח איטלקי nusach ʾitalqi.) (Note: Also known as the Minhag Italiani, Minhag B'nei Romì, Minhag Lo'ez or Minhag HaLo'azim.) is the ancient prayer rite (nusach) of the long-standing Italian Jewish (Italkim) community on the Italian Peninsula, used by Jews who are not of Ashkenazi or Sephardic origin.

== History ==
The Italian nusach has been considered an offspring of the ancient Eretz Israel minhag and it has similarities with the nusach of the Romaniote Jews of Greece and the Balkans. However, the documents discovered in Cairo Geniza reveal that the influence of Minhag Eretz Israel on Benè Romì is less extensive than believed.

== Communities where the Italian rite is practiced ==
Italian Jews have their own unique prayer rite that is neither Sephardic nusach, Nusach Ashkenaz, nor Nusach Sefard, and to a certain extent is not subject to Kabbalistic influence. In Italy, there were also communities of Spanish origin who prayed in the Sephardic rite and communities of German origin who prayed in the Western Ashkenazic rite, which were mainly in northern Italy. The Italian rite, therefore, is not the rite of all Jews in Italy, but the rite of the veteran Italian Jews, called "Loazim".

Despite being a dominant prayer rite among Italian Jews, the Italian rite rarely spread beyond its borders, unlike other prayer rites such as the Sephardic rite, which Spanish exiles brought to many places, or the Ashkenazic rite, which also reached new regions starting from the 19th century. The Italian rite hardly left the borders of Italy, except for a few cases where it reached other communities in the Middle East. For example, in the cities of Constantinople and Thessaloniki, several Italian synagogues operated until World War II, as well as in the city of Safed in the 16th and 17th centuries. Today, outside of Italy, the only communities using the Italian rite are in Jerusalem and Netanya, the main one being in the main Italian synagogue on Hillel Street in downtown Jerusalem.

== Unique features of the Nusach ==
- On Friday nights, the Maariv Aravim and Emet VeEmunah blessings are recited using a special text for the Sabbath.
- The middle benediction of the Amidah prayer of Shabbat eve says "U'meahavatach A. Eloheynu she'ahavta et Israel amach" instead of "Ata kidashta".
- The text of the 3rd berachah of the Amidah prayer is "Le'dor va'dor namelich la'E-l" even in the silent prayer. On the high holidays, this is replaced with "Le'dor va'dor nagid godlekha" (as said in the Chazzan's repetition all year in the Ashkenazic rite) in both the silent prayer and the repetition.
- The Kaddish seems to be a mix between Nusach Sefard and Nusach Ashkenaz since it says "וְיַמְלִיךְ מַלְכוּתֵהּ בְּחַיֵּיכוֹן וּבְיוֹמֵיכוֹן" like in Ashkenaz but later says "וחיים טובים עלינו" like in Sfard.
- Psalm 100 is only recited on Shabbat and Yom Tov and not on weekdays.
- Psalm 20 is not recited in between Ashrei and Uva letzion. Instead, it is recited as part of long Tachanun recited on Monday and Thursday.
- On weekdays, the Torah is returned in between Ashrei and Uva letzion.
- Aleinu is never recited at Mincha. However, according to the first printing of the Machzor from 1485, Aleinu is recited on Erev Yom Kippur when mincha is recited earlier in the day, and it would follow that it should always be recited when mincha is recited early.
- The words 'le'eila le'eila' are recited in every Kaddish.
- Kol Nidrei (Kol Nedarim) is recited in Hebrew, rather than in Aramaic.
- The 'Ve-hasieinu' prayer is recited in the prayers of Rosh Hashanah.
- According to the original custom, Kedushah opens in all prayers (including Shacharit and Mincha) with the "Keter" form. However, this is preserved today only in Padua and in the Italian community in Jerusalem.

== See also ==
- Italian Jews
