= New Figuration =

New figuration refers to artistic tendencies in post-war art that rejected the aesthetics of impersonal abstract art and updated various forms of return to the figure. While they assumed a human phenomenon, the human did not have to be physically present - a trace or sign was sufficient. The new figuration was not introduced by any manifesto and did not give rise to any homogeneous group. In relation to the previous periods, it is essentially the counterpart of sentimental-aesthetic tendencies and represents an internally urgent expression of moods and existential feelings, which can sometimes appear even as a cult of "ugliness".

== History ==
Earlier classical forms of representation drew on antiquity or the Renaissance, with the assumption that the aim of art was to reproduce the outward appearance of reality. Cubism, too, however revolutionary in its analysis and decomposition of reality, remained the "classicism of the modern age" in this respect. The post-war crisis of anthropocentrism and the related departure from traditional conceptions of figuration led temporarily to an emphasis on radical movements of non-figurative art such as neoconstructivism and geometric abstraction, which had no connection with the world of real phenomena and were assigned a purely artistic role. Adherents of a strictly geometric form founded the Salon "Réalités Nouvelles" in 1947. The wave of abstraction culminated in 1960 at the Venice Biennale, where abstract art won all four major prizes.

The starting point for the new figuration were movements focused on the subjective perception of reality, such as expressionism, which was the first to radically break away from realistic representation and interpret individual feelings independently of reality, surrealism with its concept of the inner model, and especially informel as an extreme expression of existential skepticism, which completely rejected both object representation and traditional aesthetic norms.

The new figuration, which is a reaction to the crisis of human values and reflects a sense of alienation, is more radical in its outcome and includes revolt, offensive gag, grotesque and blasphemy. It does not renounce the most vulgar naturalism and photography, but also draws on Dubuffet's Art brut and the aesthetics of the object. It does not seek to re-codify values as a philosophical or aesthetic system. In spite of its intense criticism and open skepticism, to which nothing is sacred, it signifies a new inclination towards the human predicament, and its background is the will to overcome the enormous existential and social dilemma of modern times.

=== Solitaires and predecessors ===
In addition to broader tendencies such as Neo-Dadaism, Pop Art, Nouveau Réalisme and Art brut (Jean Dubuffet), several solitaires from the early 1950s stand out in the emergence of new figuration. French sculptors Ossip Zadkine and Germaine Richier, in England Henry Moore, Kenneth Armitage, Lynn Chadwick, painters Diego Rivera, Fernand Léger, Hans Erni and especially Francis Bacon, considered the "father" of neo-expressionism. The founding fathers also include Pablo Picasso with his late works.

The sculptures of Alberto Giacometti, who was inspired by Etruscan art and emerged from Surrealism, reflect in his prime the existential crisis associated with the search for a new meaning of the figure. American Abstract Expressionism was influenced by Willem de Kooning, whose Women series of the late 1940s oscillates between abstraction and figuration.

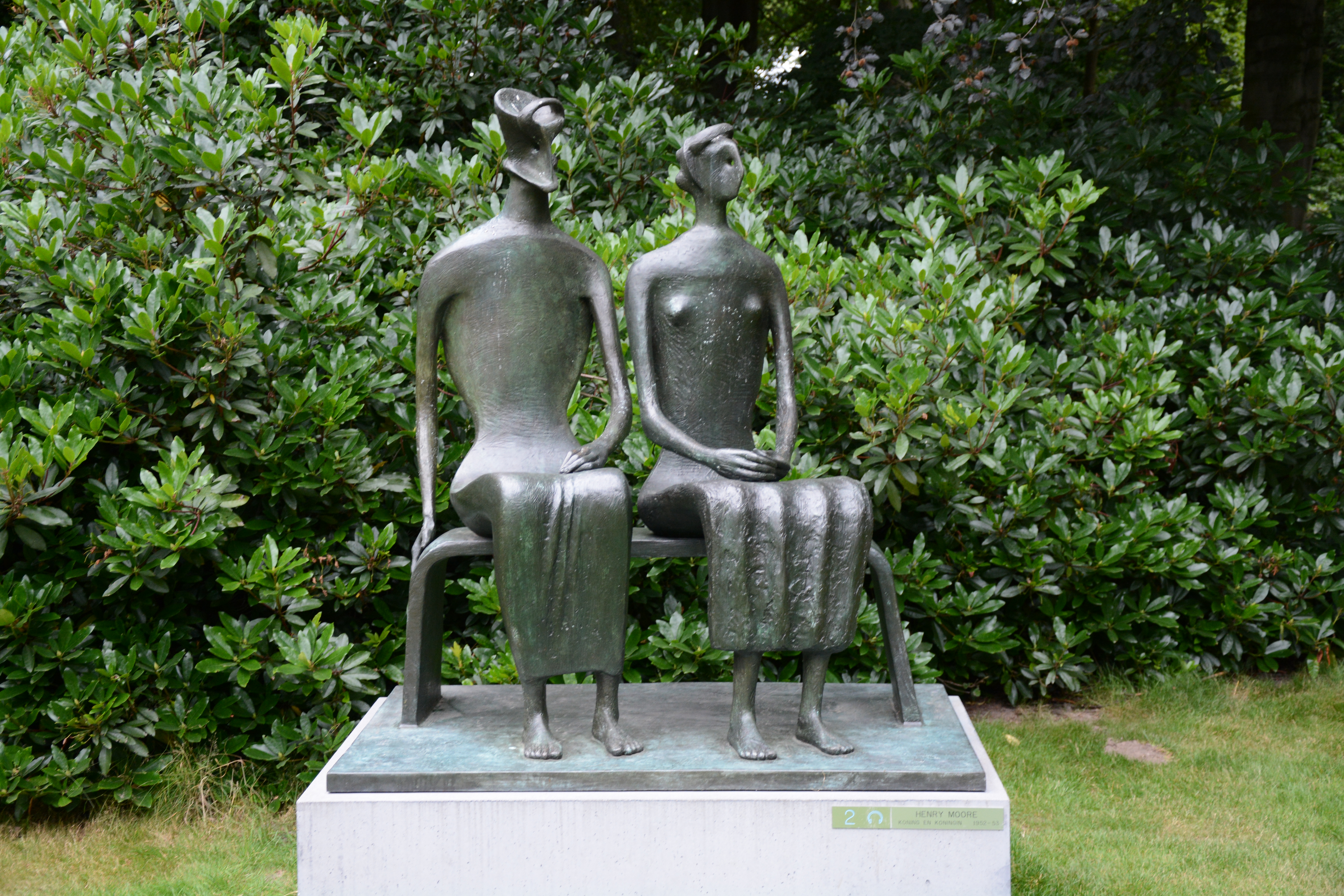
Henry Moore, King and Queen (1952-1953)

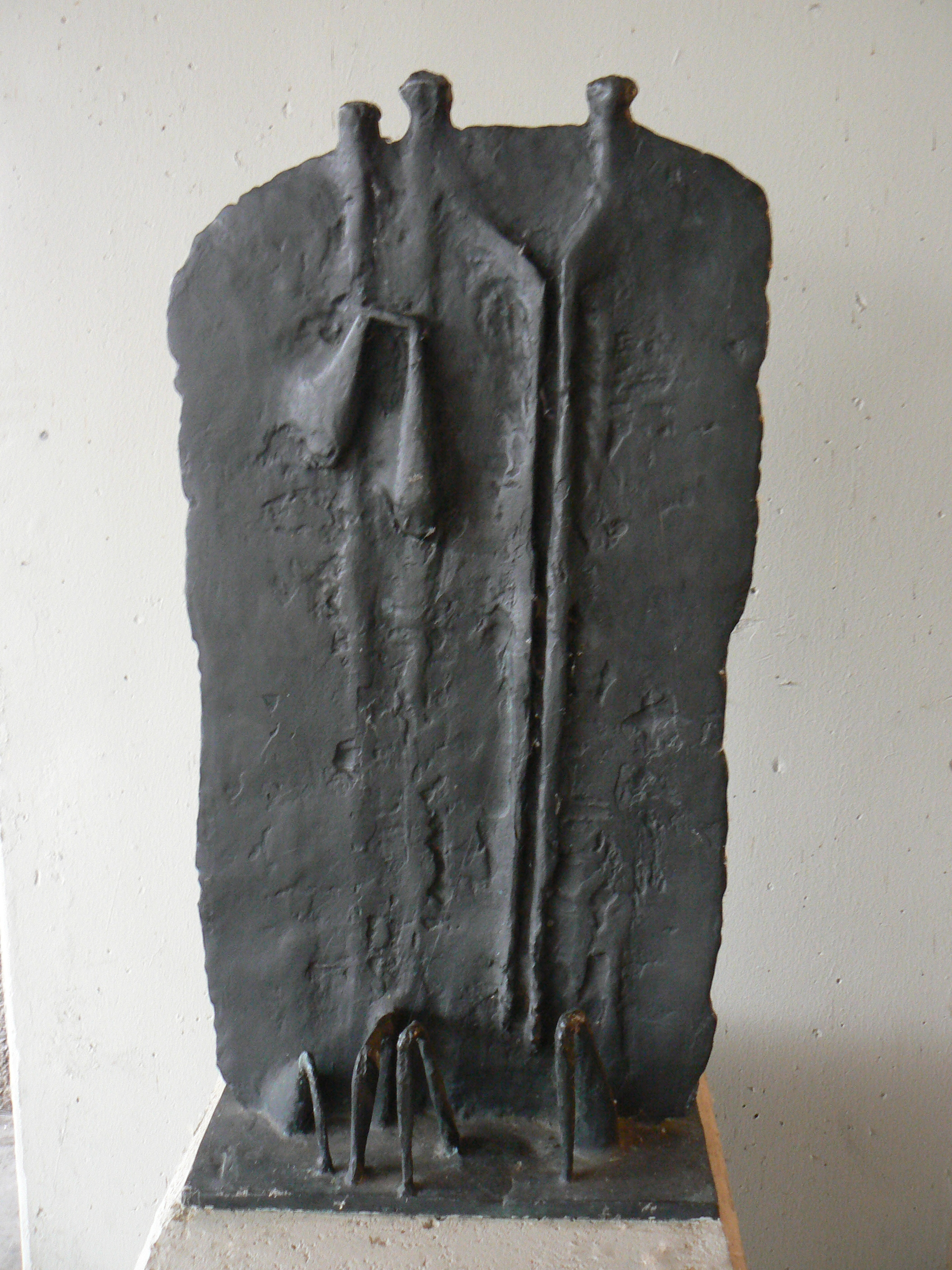
Kenneth Armitage, Sitting people (1953-1954)

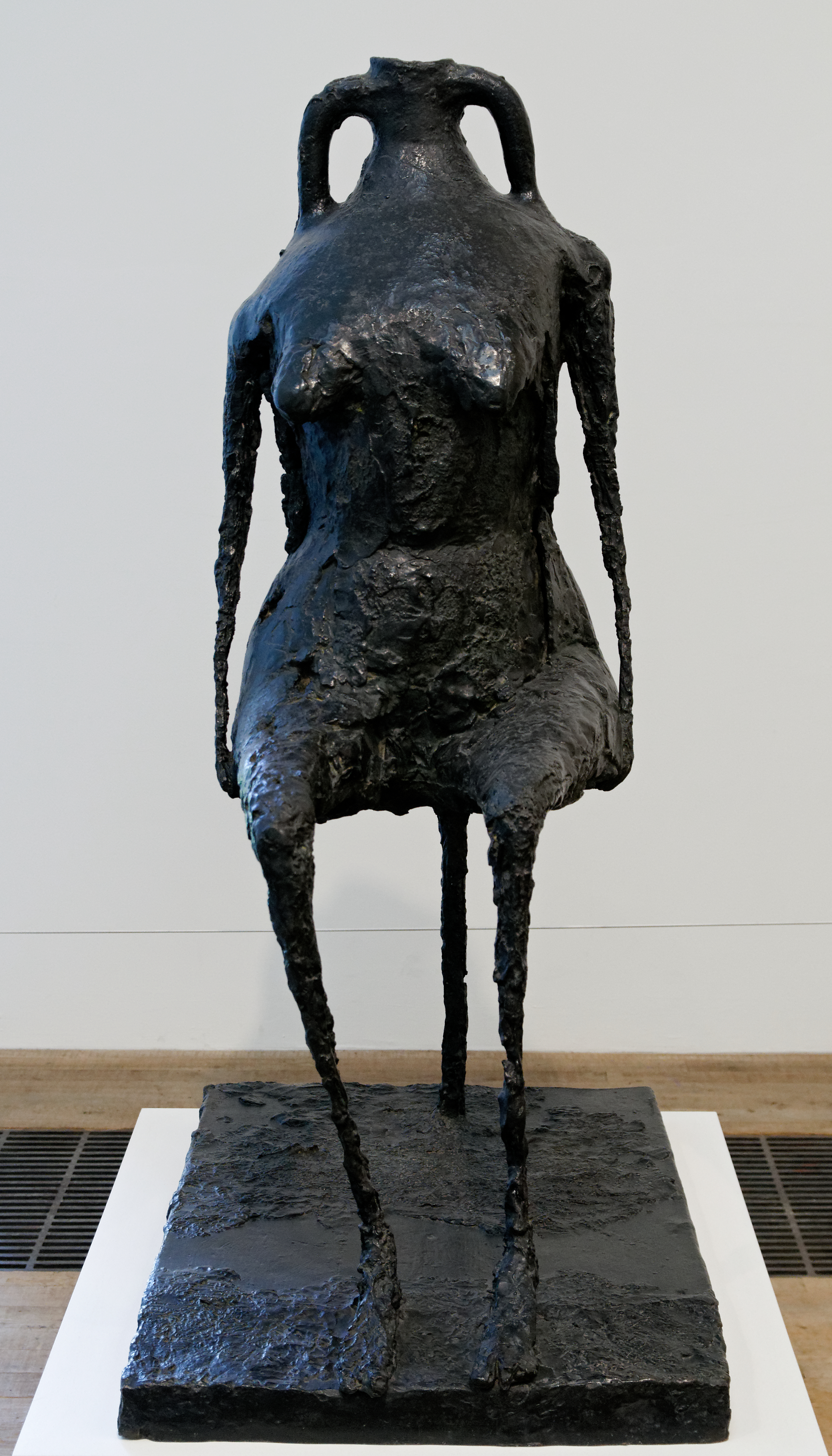
Germaine Richier, L'Eau, Tate Modern (1953-1954)

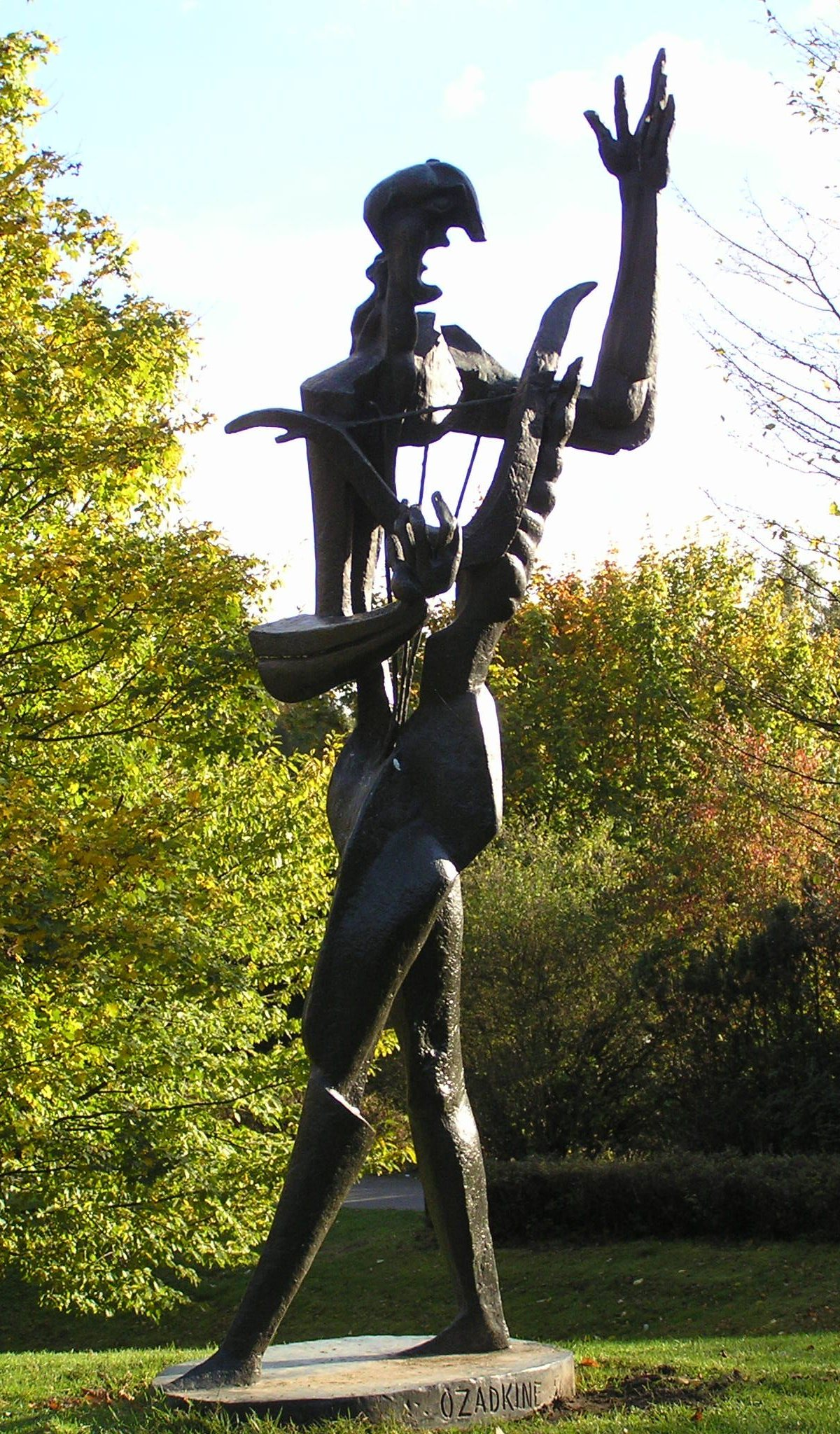
Ossip Zadkine, Grosser Orpheus (1956)

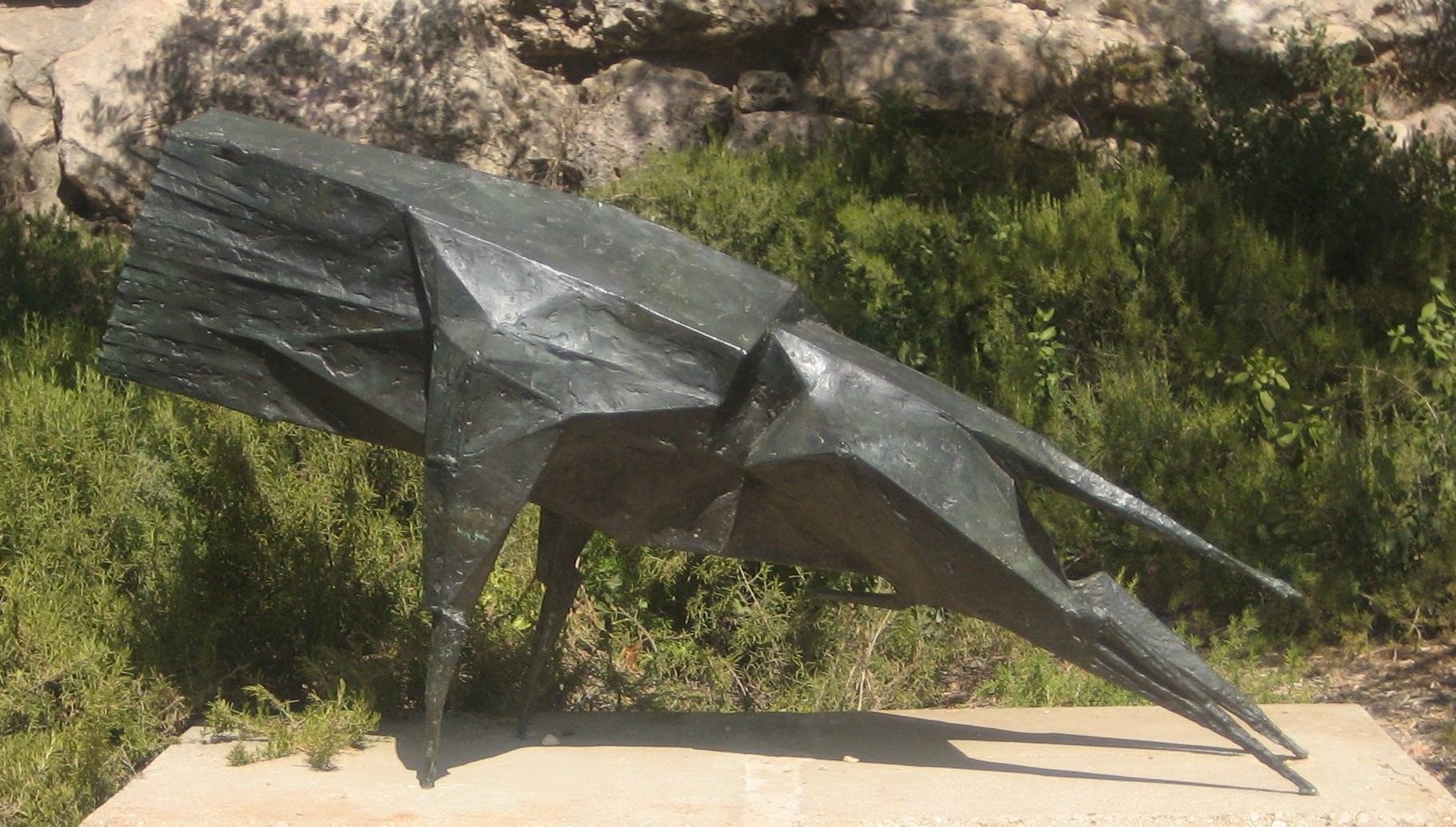
Lynn Chadwick, Roaring Lion (1960)

=== New sources of inspiration ===
New Figuration sculpture turns in part to ancient forms such as Neolithic idols and Cycladic art. The mythologization of man in sculpture and painting, in addition to archaizing tendencies (Jean Ipoustéguy, Kenneth Armitage, Olbram Zoubek, Peter Oriešek), also has a very contemporary expression in the myth of man in the 20th century. It can be found in paintings and reliefs by Pierre Bettencourt, paintings by Antonio Recalcati, Jacques Monory or a member of the Nouveau réalisme group Martial Raysse.

The radical destruction and deformation of the human figure is related to late Surrealism (Paul Wunderlich, Miodrag Djuric) and to Nordic Expressionism and the CoBrA group (Karel Appel, Asger Jorn, Pierre Alechinsky, Lucebert) and to post-Cubist formalism (Pinchas Burstein, alias Maryan S. Maryan). The destruction of the figure in the late César sculptures consists in the deliberate decomposition of a surface welded from steel plates, while the figure by Karel Nepraš is created as an assemblage of various metal elements joined by textiles.

Of the Czech painters, Jiří Načeradský and Michael Rittstein belong to this current, and of the foreign painters, the Argentine Rómulo Macció or the Spaniard Antonio Saura. In sculpture, the radical deformation of the figure can be flat, as in relief sculptures by Vladimír Janoušek, or the German sculptor Horst Antes.

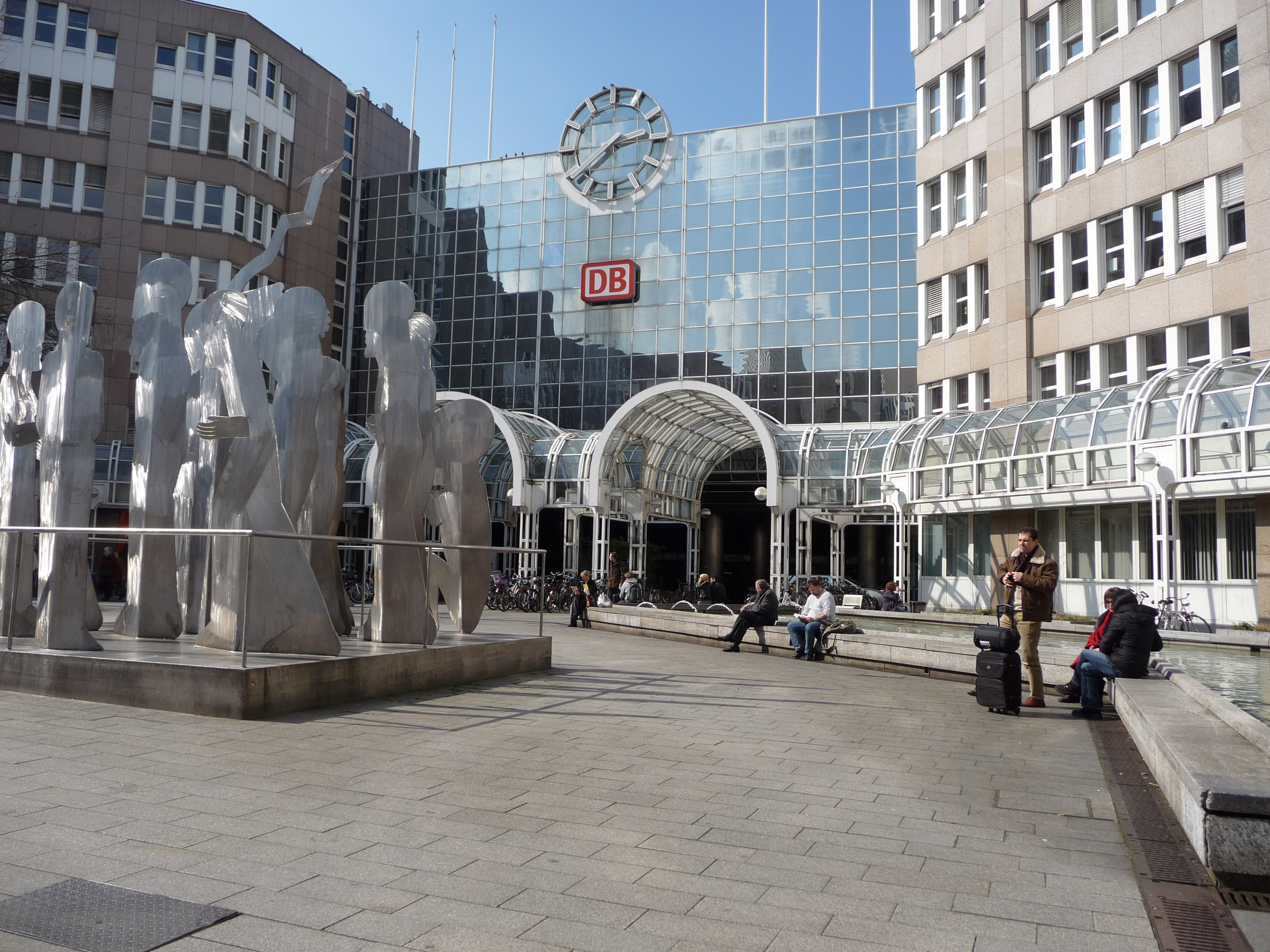
Horst Antes, Düsseldorf

The grotesque monstrosity and wild colouring of Niki de Saint-Phalle's figures and the late sculptural work of Karel Appel is based on Pop art. The sense of human alienation can take the form of signs in artworks that reflect the modern world as a set of its proxies, and is already related to conceptual art (Robert Rauschenberg), environmental art (Paul Thek) or performance art (Bruce Lacey). Alienation can also take the form of radical leftist anti-bourgeois and anti-militarist engaged art (Jacques Grinberg, Giovanni Giannini).

The majority of the Czech artists of New Figuration went through the Informel period and their work retains a strong existential subtext despite its external grotesqueness (Zbyšek Sion, Zdeněk Beran, Karel Nepraš, Jan Hendrych, Aleš Veselý). While Western artists such as Canadian Edmund Alleyn more strongly perceive the alienation of technical civilization, art classified in the 1970s and 1980s as "Czech grotesque" is considered an ironic representation of stereotypes of human behaviour (Karel Pauzer, Hana Purkrábková) or bourgeoisie and political establishment (Bohumil Zemánek, Michael Rittstein). The paintings of prominent colourists, such as Otakar Slavík or Jiří Sopko, and painters who follow socially critical premises (Jitka Válová, Květa Válová) also thematise the extremes of human existence.

The new figuration also includes the reinterpretation of established pictorial signs - e.g. advertising banners (Roy Lichtenstein, James Rosenquist) or appropriation of well-known works. After Bacon and his 1948 Portrait of Pope Innocent X, Eduardo Arroyo and Alberto Gironella also created reminiscences of Vélasquez. In the work of these artists, it is not an inspiration by the art of another epoch but "images of images" as a kind of superphenomenon (Larry Rivers).

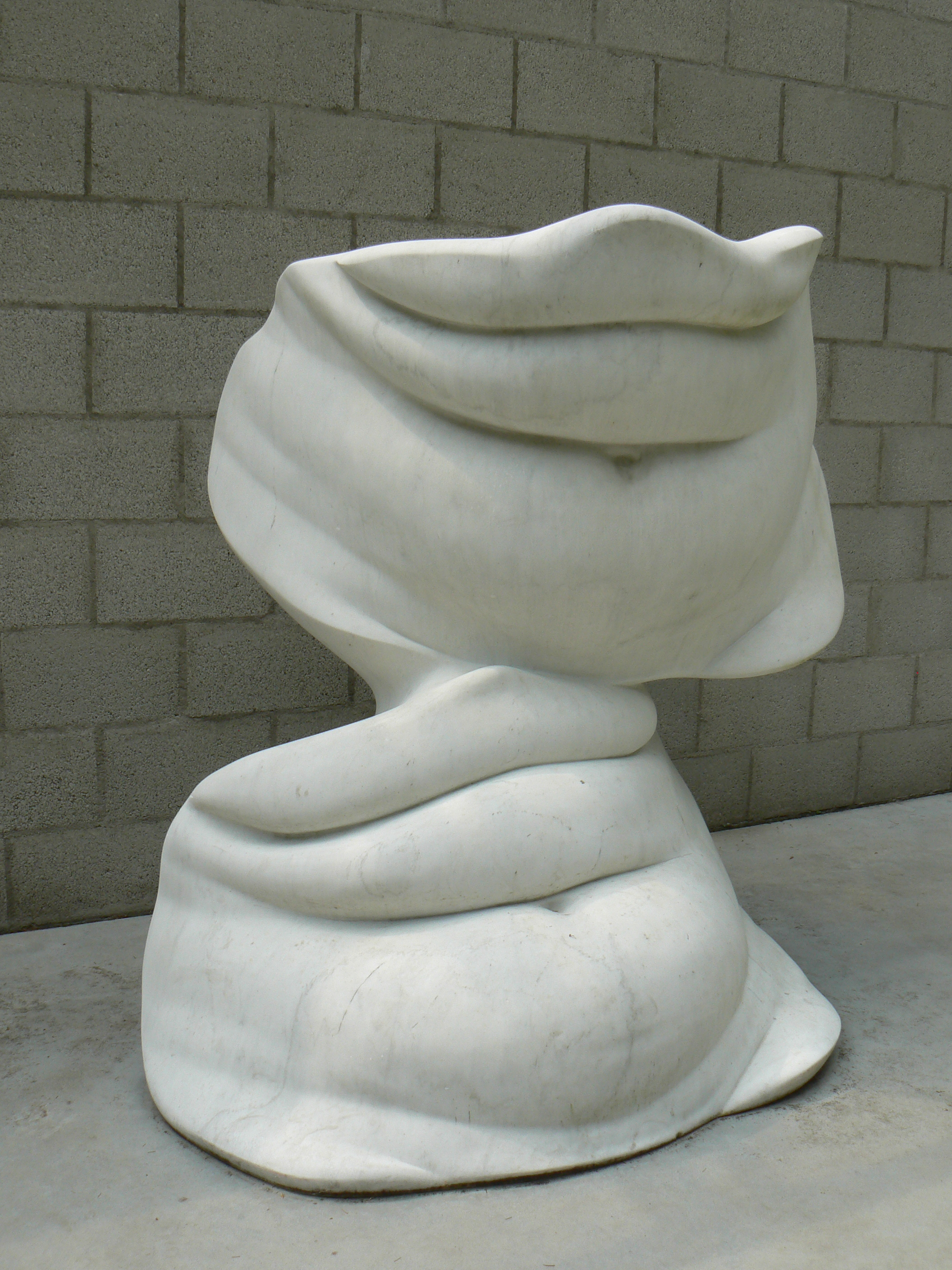
Alina Szapocznikow, Belly

Anthropometry became one of the new ways of depicting the human figure - casting a part (César, Eva Kmentova, Alina Szapocznikow) or the whole figure (George Segal) or imprinting the body on canvas (Yves Klein, Rudolf Němec). According to Chalupecký, it is an extreme means of making a person present in a work of art. The outlines of figures and various templates were created using a spray gun by François Arnal or Rudolf Němec. The blending of photorealistic painting transferred onto a polished steel plate and the mirror reflection of the viewer was used in works by Michelangelo Pistoletto, a member of Arte Povera.

The new figuration also returns to the narrative principle in the works of some artists. The influential art critic and co-founder of the art magazine Opus International Gérald Gassiot-Talabot had the idea of bringing together, under the umbrella term "narrative figuration", the work of young artists working between 1960 and 1980 (Gilles Aillaud, Eduardo Arroyo, Jacques Monory, Bernard Rancillac). Narrative figuration works with cycles of images or the delineation of plots in discrete fields (Cloisonné), multiplication and variant representations of a single motif, or transfigurations (Eduardo Arroyo). Narrative collages inspired by photographs from newspapers, magazines and film posters are created by Peter Klasen.

The alienation of modern consumer society, with its mass production of goods, was the inspiration for Warhol's famous series of silkscreens of the Mona Lisa ("thirty is better than one"). The figurative work of pop-art artists (Richard Hamilton, Ronald Kitaj, Allen Jones, Enrico Baj, etc.) represents a distinctive contribution to the new figuration, even though it originally arose from specific neo-Dadaist motives. A similar principle of repeating the anonymous faces of people from newspaper photographs was used by Argentine Rubens Gerchman. The visual effect of multiplying a single motif is also the subject of Japanese sculptor Tomio Miki. The relationship between the individual and the crowd, seen from a bird's eye view, is explored by Juan Genovés in his sculptures and installations, and by Czech painter Jan Měřička.

One of the features of the new figuration, but one that has a wider reach and concerns the whole spectrum of modern art, is the abandonment of classical forms of depiction. The distinction between sculpture and installation is blurred, the two-dimensional image enters a three-dimensional space (Marisol Escobar) or loses its precise boundaries (Jan Kotík). Antonio Berni, who is one of the representatives of the South American social critical painting Nuevo Realismo, used reliefs from the civilization garbage in his series Juanito Laguna. In his work, the new figuration is linked to the "New Objecthood". In the work of Bedřich Dlouhý, the two components of the work eventually become independent as the object and its pictorial background.

Unconventional techniques of depicting the figure using perforation were used by Adriena Šimotová on large-scale objects made of layered paper and by Alena Kučerová in her prints from perforated metal matrices.

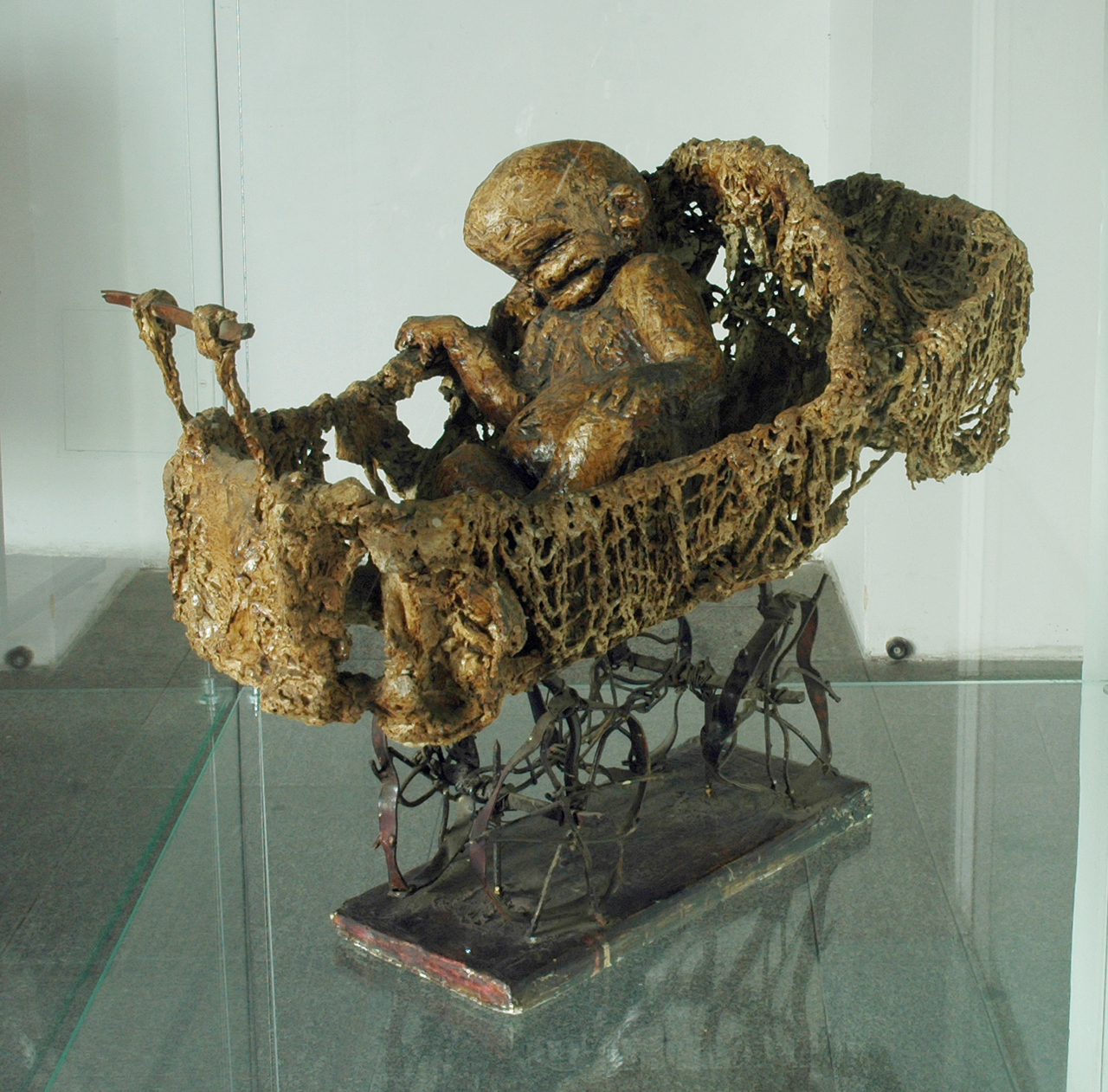
Bohumil Zemánek, Pram (1964)

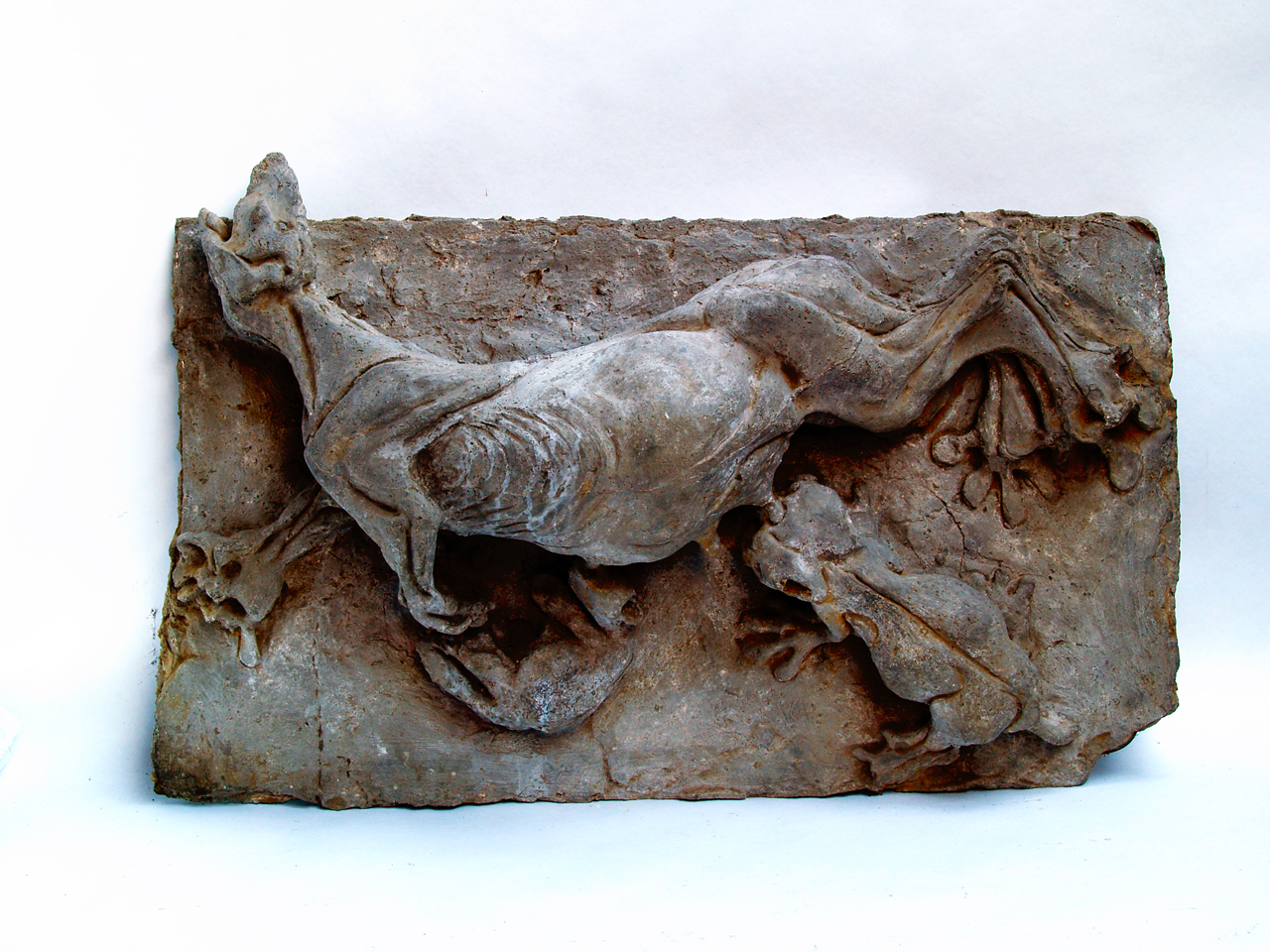
Karel Pauzer, Family (1968)

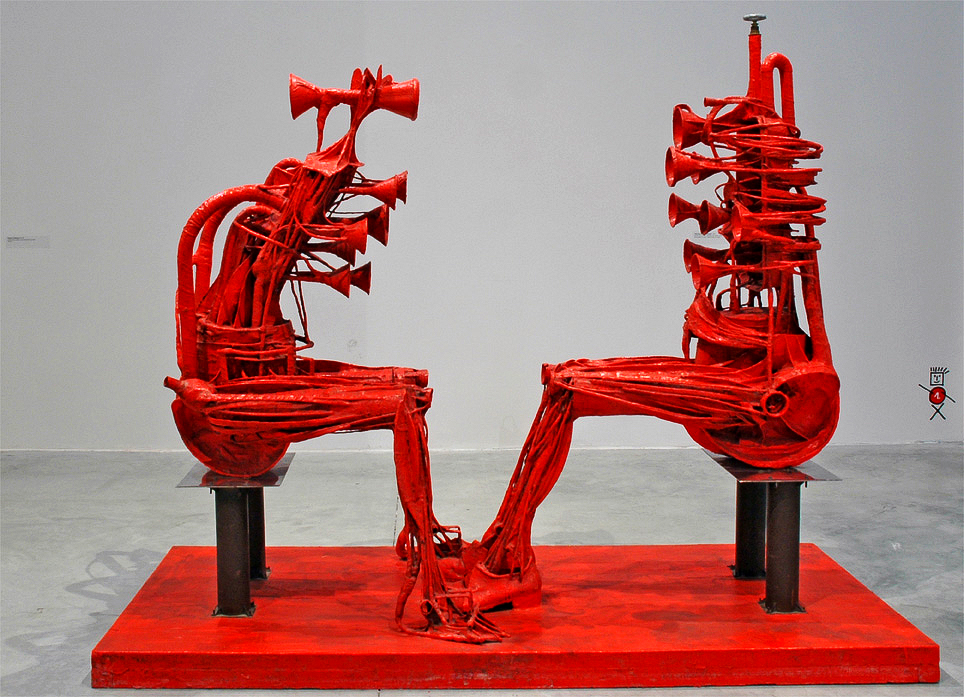
Karel Nepraš, Big dialogue (1966)

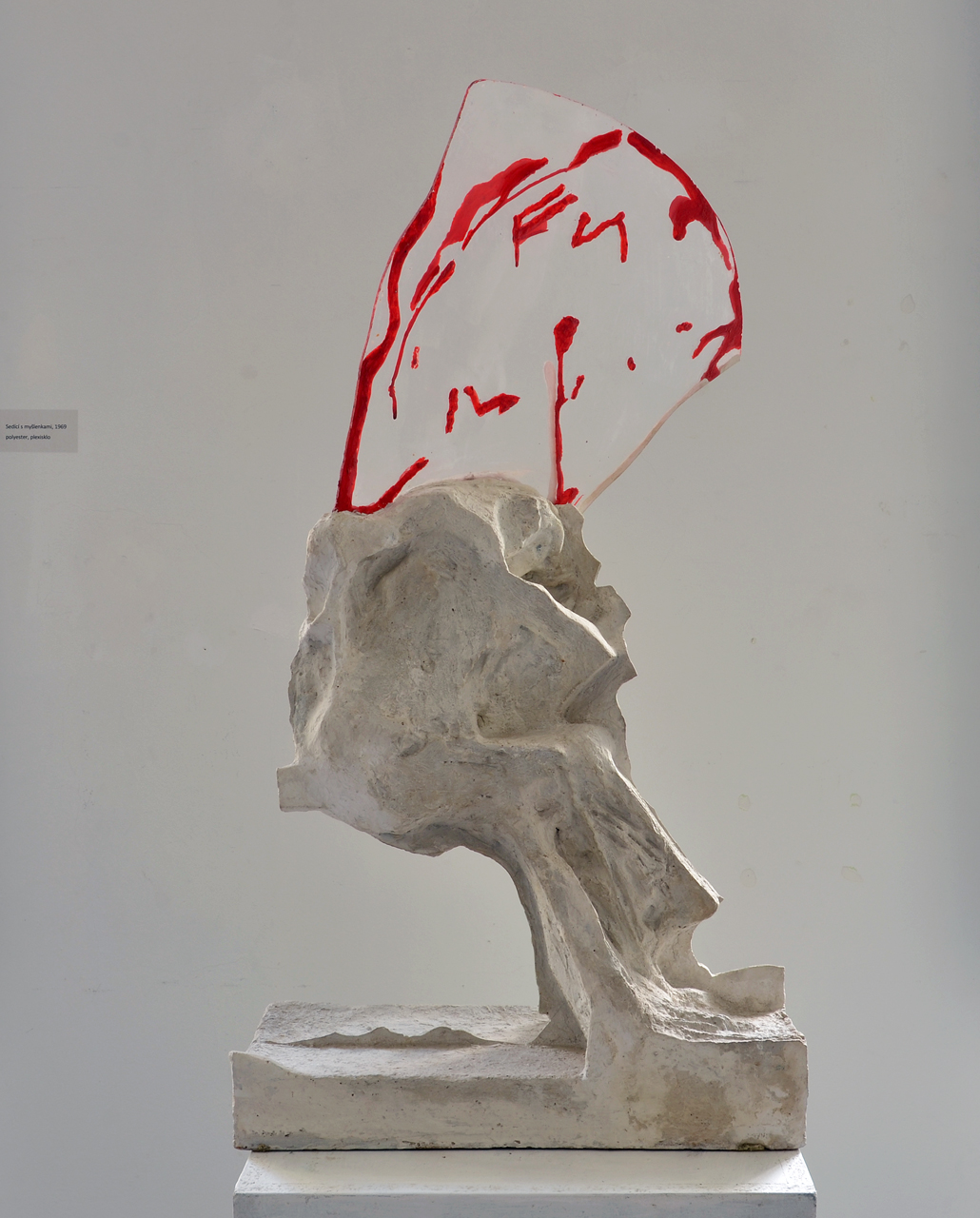
Jan Hendrych, Sitting with Thoughts (1969)

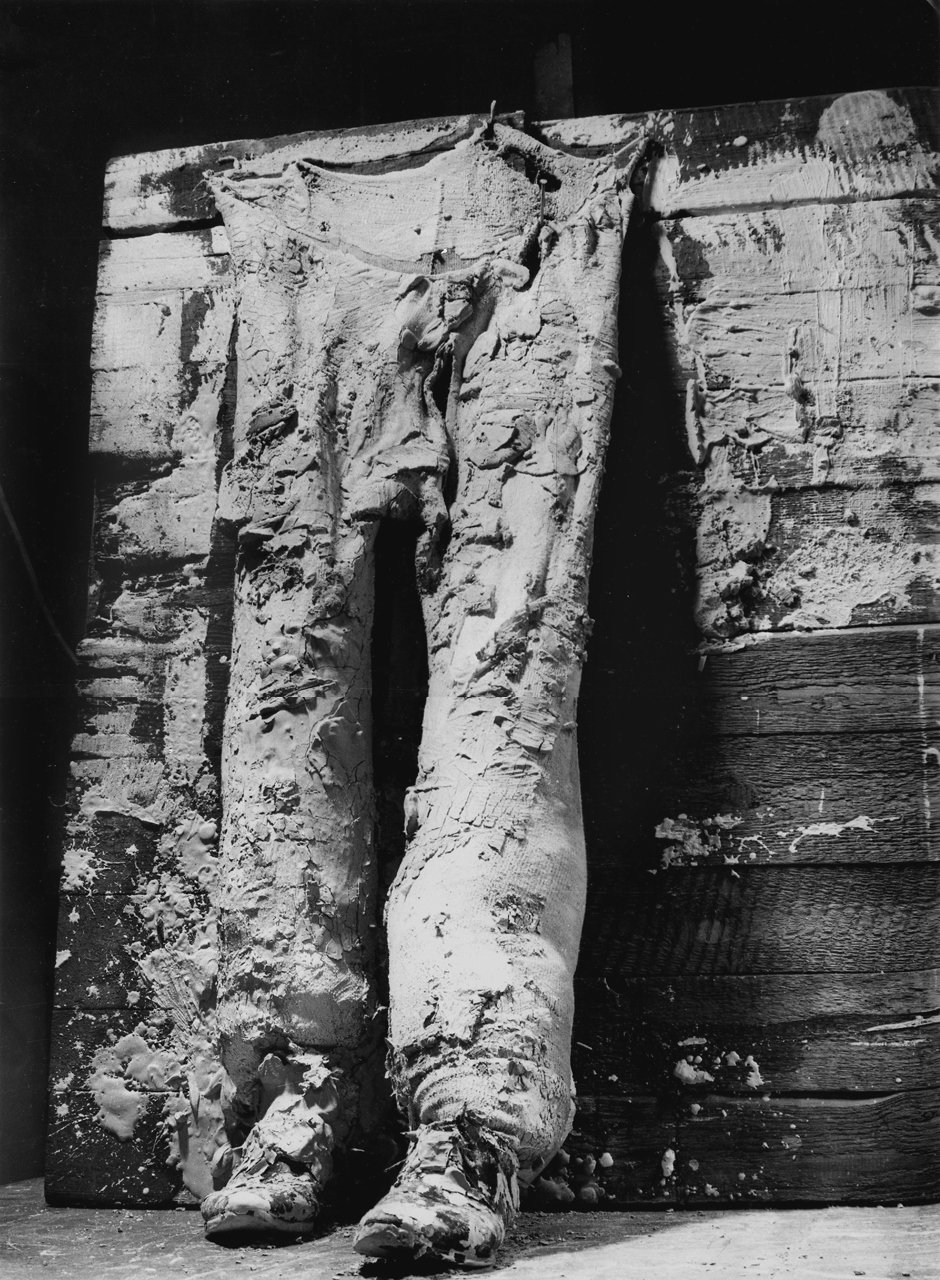
Zdeněk Beran, Object IV (1969)

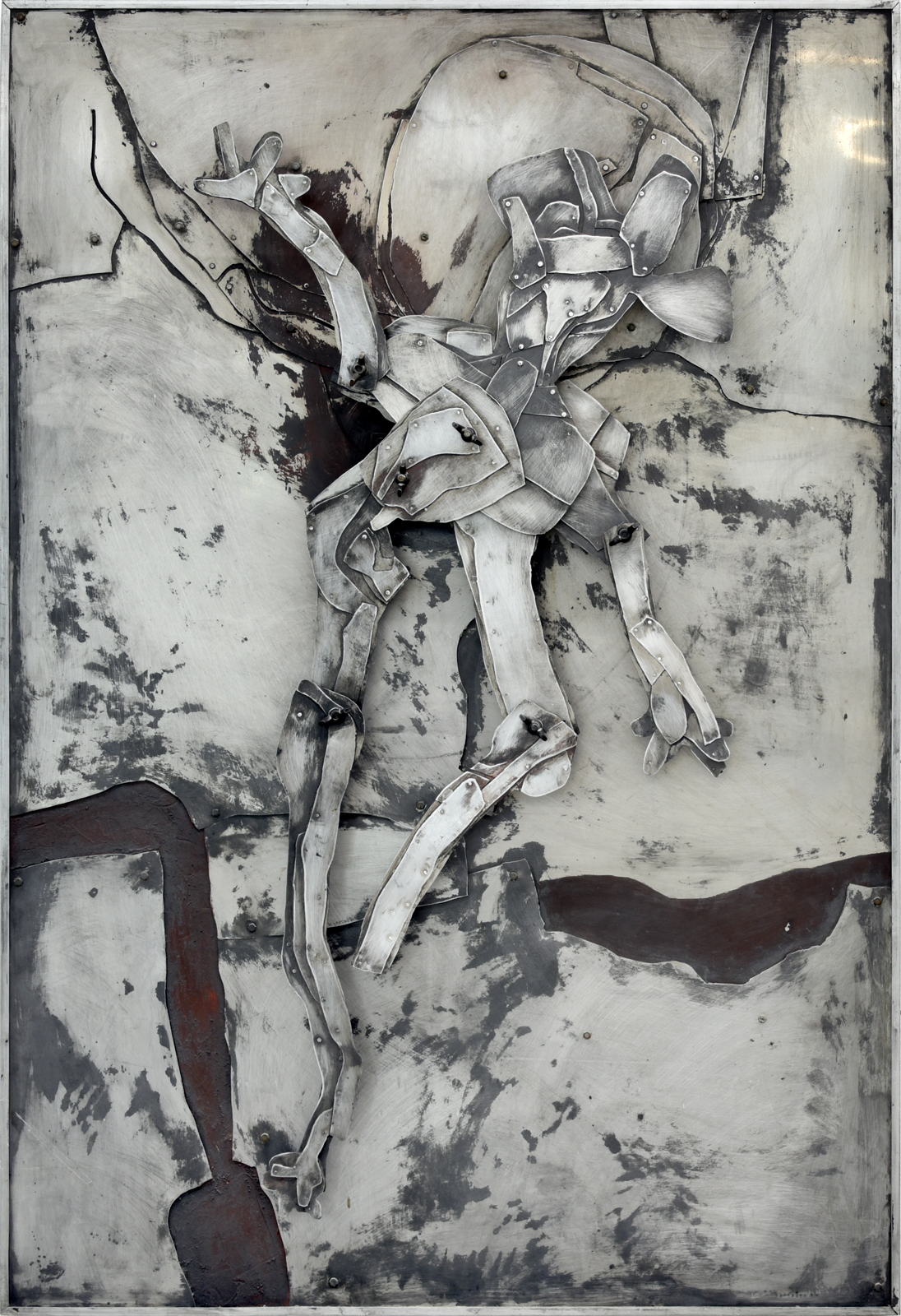
Vladimír Janoušek, Till Eulenspiegel (1978)

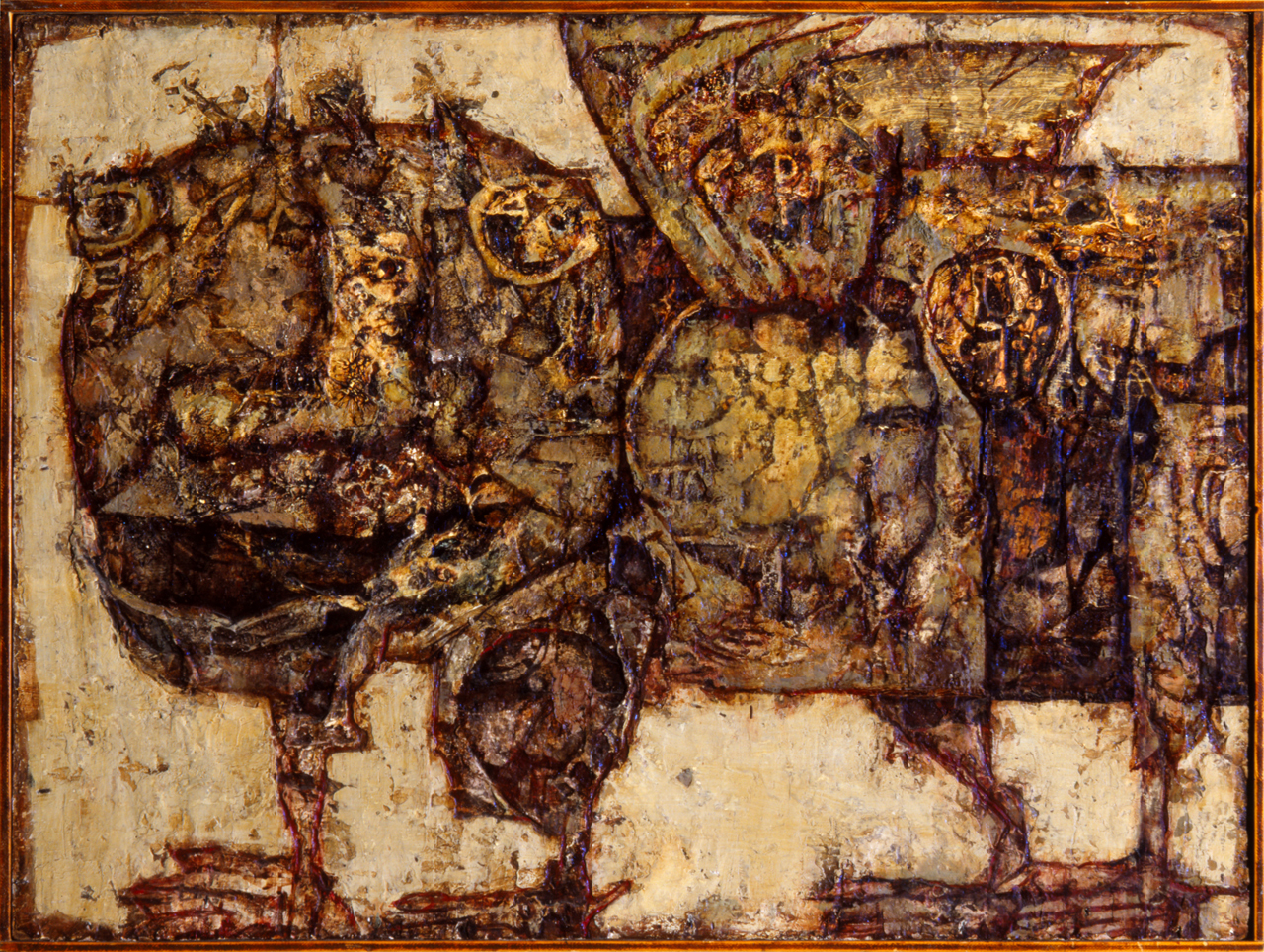
Zbyšek Sion, Apokalyptic Grasshopper I (1963)

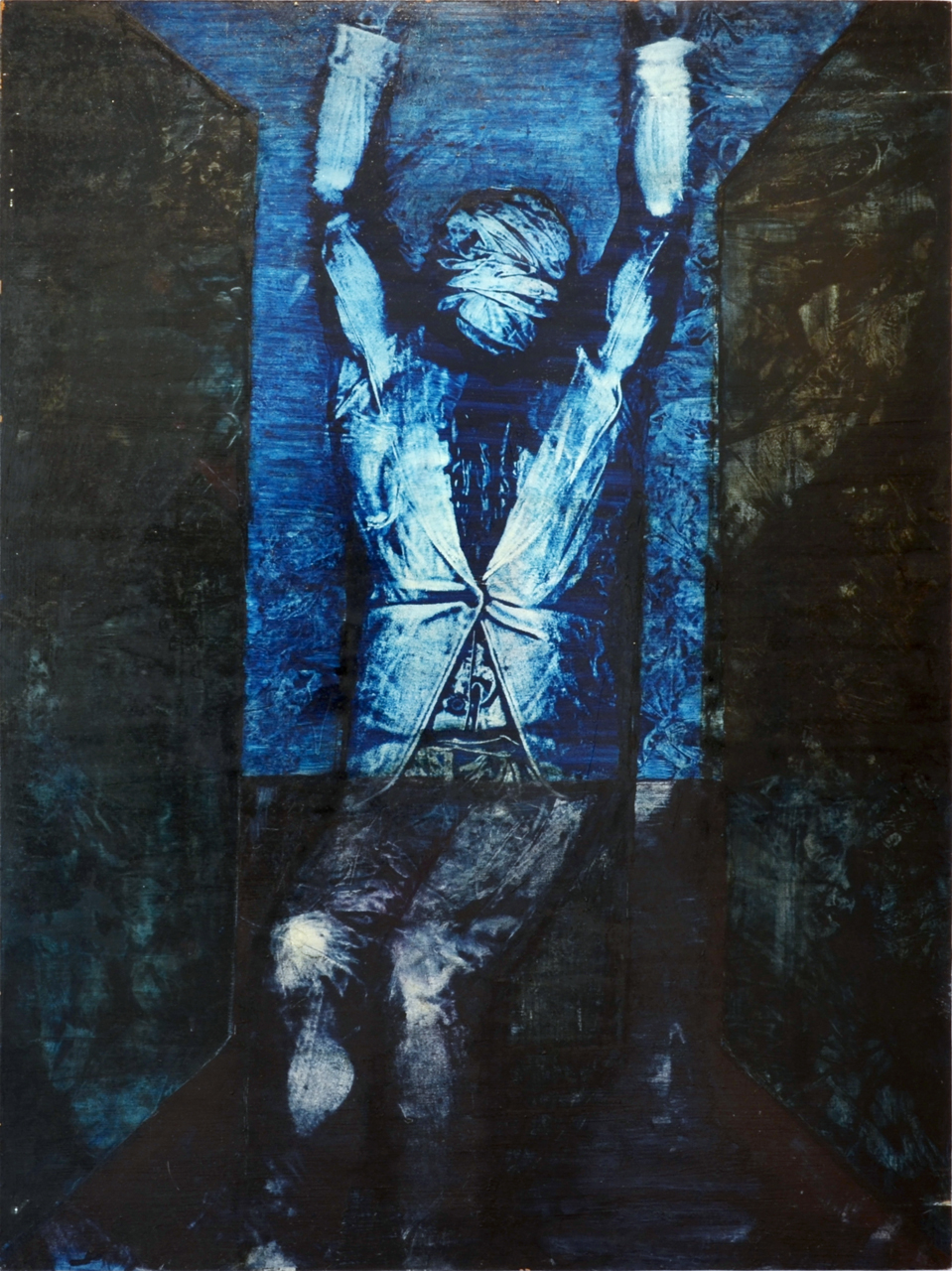
Rudolf Němec, Sitting (1967), National gallery in Prague

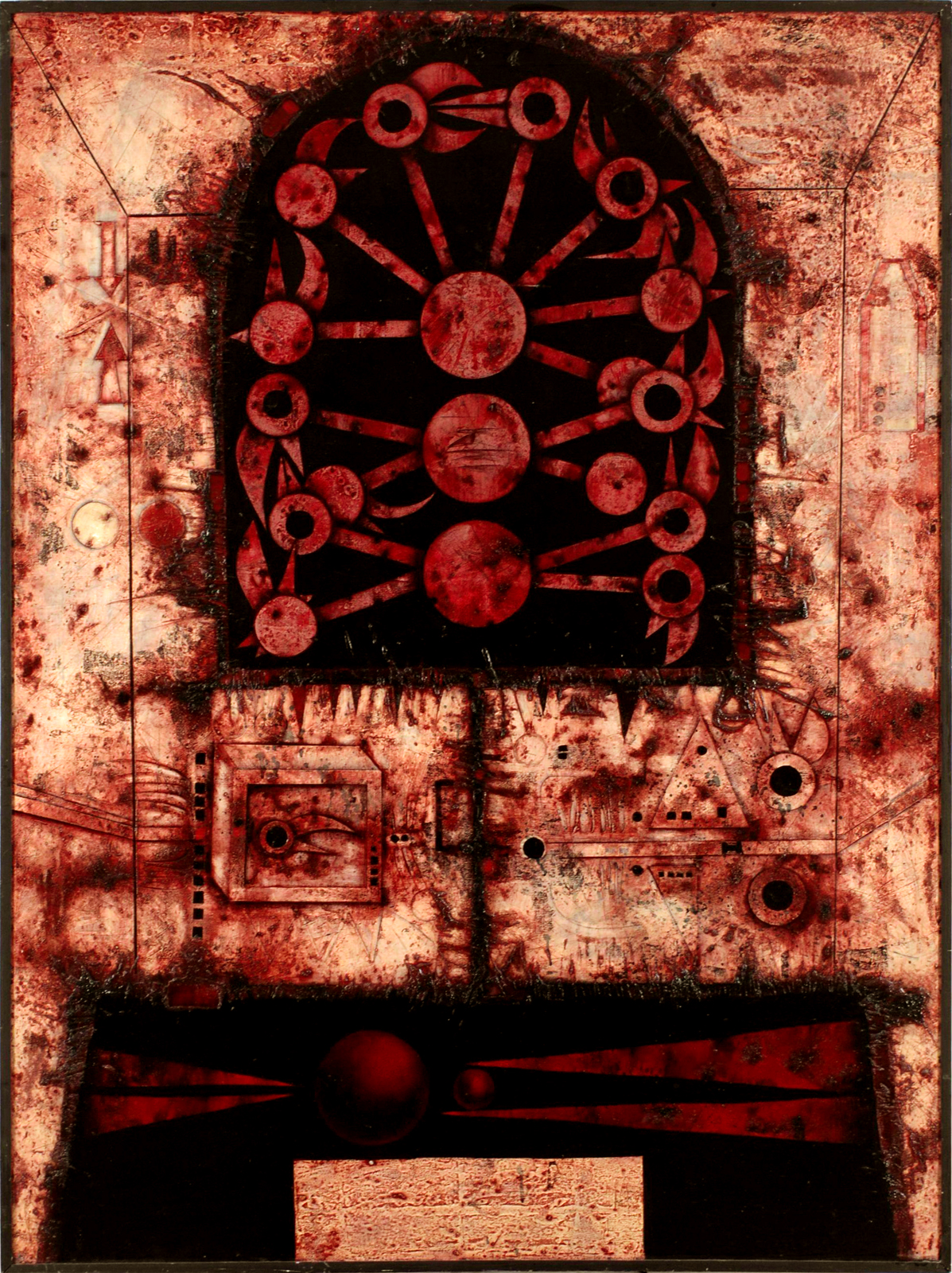
Mikuláš Medek, Depiction of View of a Man in Tension (1967)

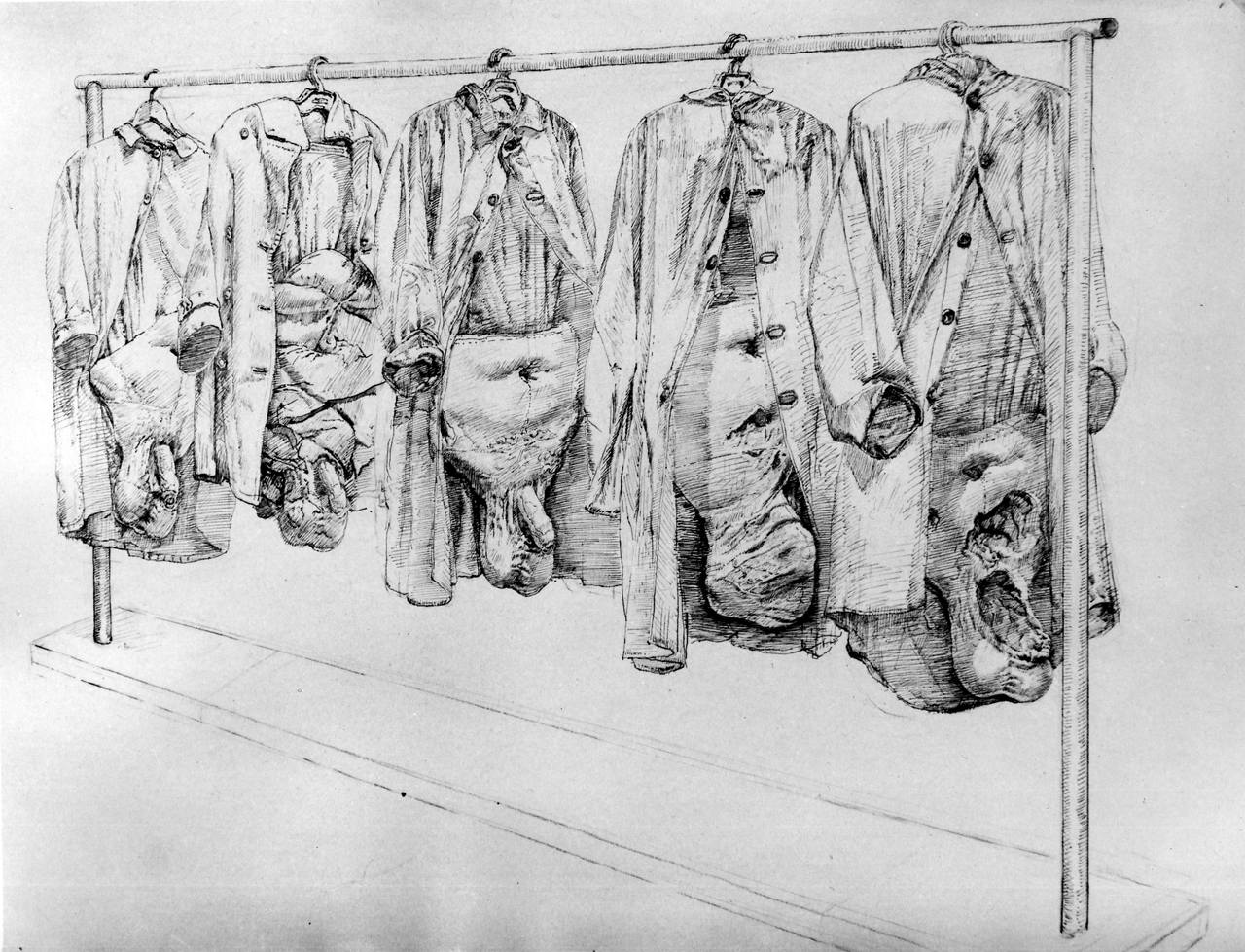
Zdeněk Beran, Study for the object Men's Rack, Rehabilitation Department of Dr.Dr. (1970)

== Exhibitions (selection) ==
- 1960 Salon des réalités nouvelles, Paris
- 1964 Everyday Mythologies, Musée d'art moderne de la Ville de Paris, Salon de mai
- 1969/1970 Nová figurace / New Figuration, Mánes, Prague, Dům umění, Brno
- 1977 Mythologies quotidiennes II, Musée d'art moderne de la ville de Paris
- 1990 Nouvelle Figuration, Schwarz Gallery, Los Angeles
- 1993-1994 Nová figurace / New Figuration, Litoměřice, Pardubice, Brno, Opava, Jihlava
- 2008 Figuration narrative, 1960–1972, Grand Palais, Paříž, galerie Anne-Marie et Roland Pallade, Lyon
- 2022 The New Figuration, Friedman Benda, New York

== Sources ==
- Petrová Eva, Nová figurace / New figuration, Mánes, Union of Czech Visual Artists, Prague 1969
- Marian Váross, Nová figurácia : Die neue Figuration = La nouvelle figuration = The new figuration, Pallas, Bratislava 1969
- Fernand Hazan (ed.), Nouveau dictionnaire de la sculpture moderne, Paris 1970
- Novák Luděk, Nová figurace / New figuration, Obelisk, Prague 1970
- Petrová Eva, Nová figurace / Nouvelle figuration, Dům umění města Brna 1970
- Donald B Kuspit, New figuration, contemporary art from Germany, Frederick S. Wight Art Gallery, Los Angeles, 1983
- The New figuration: Six French artists together again (Erró, Klassen, Monory, Rancillac, Stämpfli, Telemaque), 1960-1990 Mayer-Schwarz Gallery, Beverly Hills, CA, 1990
- Petrová Eva, Nová figurace / New figuration (painting, graphics and sculpture of the 60s and early 70s), North Bohemian Gallery of Fine Arts, Litoměřice, 1993
- Patrick Frank, Painting in a State of Exception: New Figuration in Argentina, 1960–1965, University Press of Florida 2017
