= Cherasco Synagogue =

Former synagogue in Cherasco, Italy

- Italian: Sinagoga di Cherasco
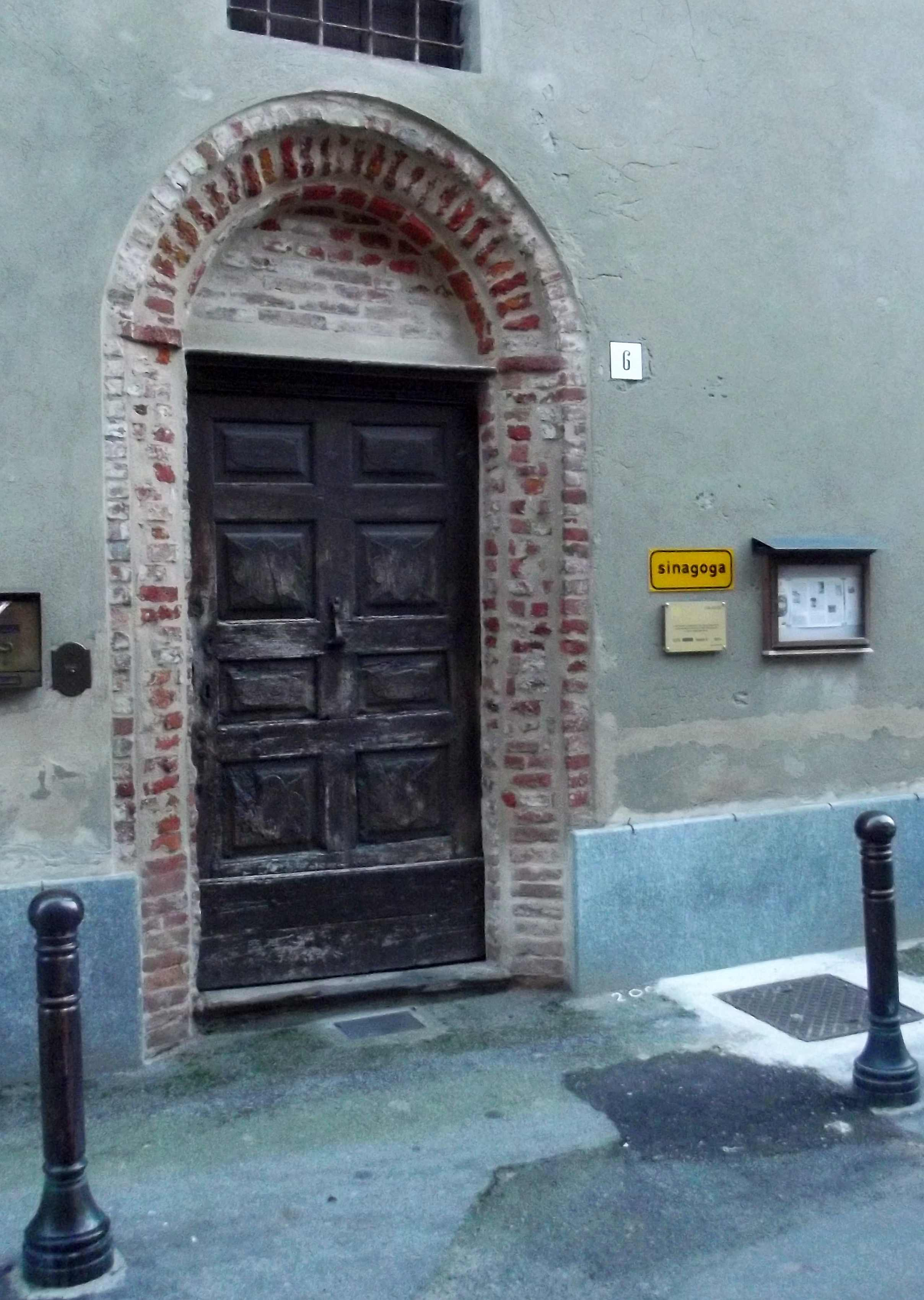
- Entrance to the former synagogue, in 2000

- Location of the synagogue in Piedmont

Religion
- Affiliation: Judaism (former)
- Rite: Italian rite
- Ecclesiastical or organizational status: Synagogue
- Status: Inactive

Location
- Location: Via Marconi 4, Cherasco, Piedmont
- Country: Italy
- Interactive map of Cherasco Synagogue
- Coordinates: 44°39′3.9″N 7°51′27″E

Architecture
- Type: Synagogue architecture
- Style: Baroque
- Completed: 18th century
- Materials: Brick

Website
- cherasco1547.org

The Cherasco Synagogue (Italian: Sinagoga di Cherasco) is a former Jewish congregation and synagogue, that is located at Via Marconi 4, in Cherasco, Piedmont, Italy. Designed in the Baroque style, the synagogue was completed in the 18th century.

== History ==
A Jewish community, engaged in silk production and banking, is recorded in Cherasco from the 16th century onward. A ghetto was defined in 1723, but Jews continued to live outside the ghetto. In 1813, Abramo (Abraham) Debenedetti served on the town council. Emilio Debenedetti, an engineer, designed and constructed the town electrical system.

The Cherasco synagogue is of uncertain date. A date of 5557 (1797) on a stone plaque above a stone basin for ritual washing on a staircase may refer to the date of the synagogue's construction, or of a renovation.

The Cherasco Synagogue is one of about sixteen that survive in Piedmont, including synagogues in Casale Monferrato, Biella and Vercelli.

The synagogue has been preserved, but is no longer in use. It is sometimes open to visitors.

== Architecture ==
The small synagogue is lit by windows overlooking the courtyard. The courtyard location concealed within a residential building is typical of synagogues built in pre-modern Italy. It was a precautionary measure taken so that none of the sounds of Jewish worship should reach Christian ears and possibly provoke a pogrom or repressive anti-Jewish measures. This location also permitted Jews to enter the synagogue without going outside the ghetto.

The 18th-century late-Baroque Torah ark and bimah feature the twisted Solomonic columns long popular in Italian synagogues. The doors of the ark feature the Ten Commandments in gilded lettering. The "elegant" free-standing octagonal bimah is of carved wood with two sides open to allow access, and an elaborately painted and gilded baldachin. Benches for seating are arranged along the walls of the small synagogue. Decorative wall inscriptions include the names of families who once lived in Cherasco.

There is a women's gallery, and a room that once was the school of the small Jewish community. As of 2003, the schoolroom contained an exhibition on "Jewish Life and Culture - Photographic Documentation of the Jewish Presence in the 18th and 19th Centuries," curated by Giorgio Avigdor in 1984.

== See also ==
- History of the Jews in Italy
- List of synagogues in Italy
