= Synagogue of Casale Monferrato =

Synagogue in Casale Monferrato, Italy

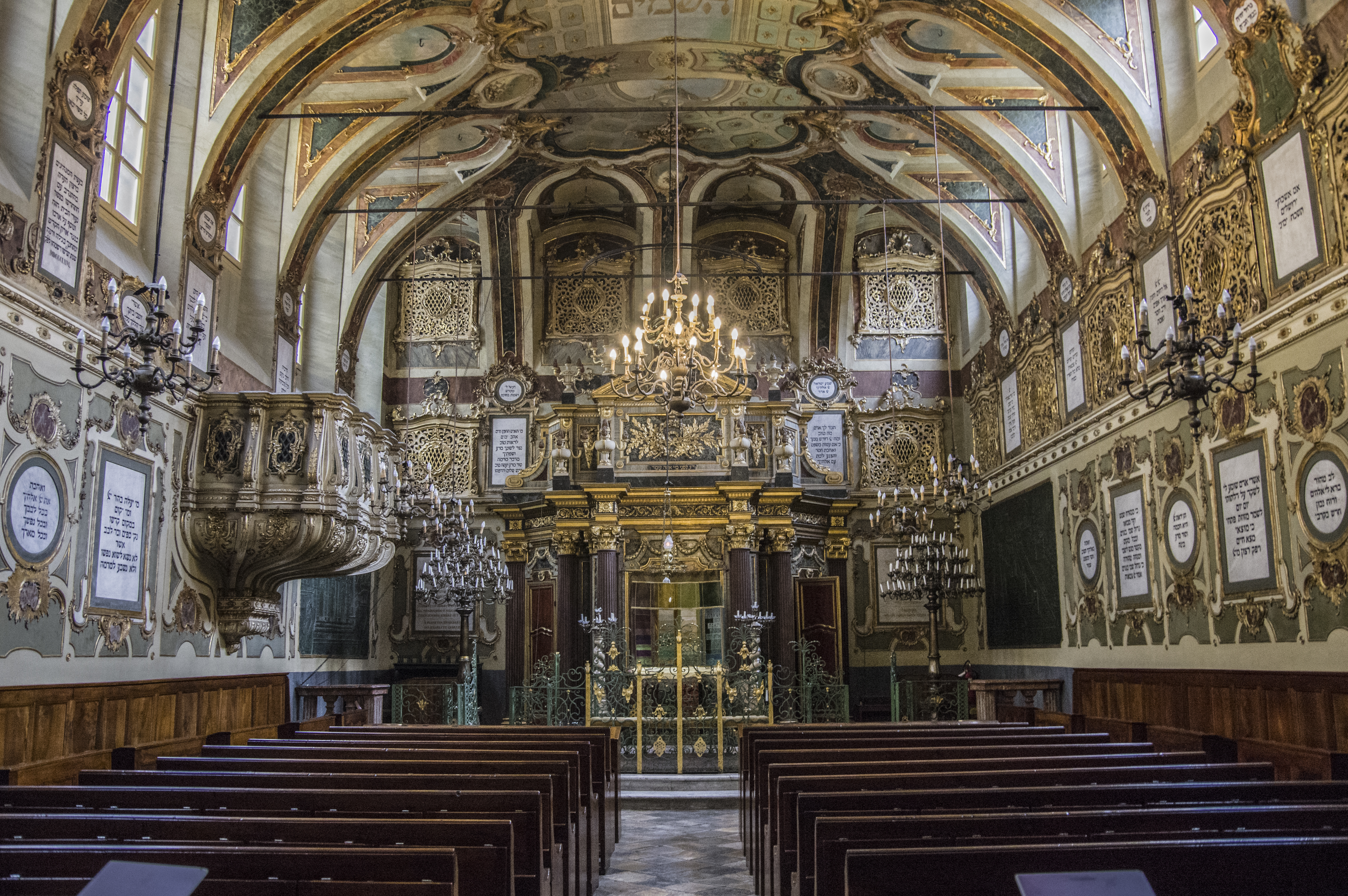
- The synagogue interior, in 2016

- Location of the synagogue in Piedmont

Religion
- Affiliation: Orthodox Judaism
- Rite: Nusach Ashkenaz
- Ecclesiastical or organisational status: Synagogue (since 1595); and; Jewish museum (since 1968)
- Status: Active

Location
- Location: Vicolo Salomone Olper 44, Casale Monferrato, Province of Alessandria, Piedmont
- Country: Italy
- Coordinates: 45°8′8.7″N 8°26′59″E

Architecture
- Architects: unknown (1595); Giulio Bourbon (1968)
- Type: Synagogue architecture
- Style: Piedmontese Baroque; Mannerist
- Completed: 1595; 1968 (restoration)
- Materials: Brick

Website
- casalebraica.org (in Italian)

The Synagogue of Casale Monferrato is an Orthodox Jewish congregation and synagogue, located at Vicolo Salomone Olper 44, in the Jewish quarter of Casale Monferrato, Province of Alessandria, in the region of Piedmont, Italy. Built in the Piedmontese Baroque and Mannerist styles, the synagogue was completed in 1595.

Partially devastated by Nazis during World War II, the synagogue fell into neglect. In 1968, the synagogue was restored and partially preserved as a Jewish museum. The synagogue was recognized as an Italian national treasure in 1969. The synagogue and museum are a magnificent example of Piedmontese Baroque architecture.

== History ==
The synagogue was built in 1595 and is particularly known for its exquisite Baroque interior with walls and ceiling embellished with elaborate painting, carving and gilding. It is located in a narrow alleyway in the traditionally Jewish quarter of Casale Monferrato, which in the eighteenth century became the city’s ghetto. The plain building houses a clandestine synagogue, giving no indication of its purpose as a Jewish house of worship.

As in most early modern European synagogues, the synagogue was entered not directly from the street, but via a courtyard: both for reasons of security and to comply with laws requiring that the sound of Jewish worship not be audible by Christians.

The Casale Monferrato synagogue is one of the few synagogues that survived in Piedmont, which once had many. Others in or close to Monferrato and the Langhe include the Biella Synagogue, the Vercelli Synagogue, the Moncalvo Synagogue, and those of Asti, Alessandria, Chieri, Carmagnola, Cherasco, and Trino Vercellese.

In 1941, the synagogue was vandalized in the context of the Fascist persecution of Jews during World War II.

The synagogue is listed as a National Monument of Italy since the restoration works carried out in 1968.

== The museums ==
The Jewish Art and History Museum, also known as the Museum of Silverware (Museo degli Argenti), was designed by Giulio Bourbon and is located in part in the former women’s gallery of the synagogue. On display are precious silver ceremonial objects and embroidered textiles, as well as artefacts related to Jewish festivals and domestic life.

The Museum of Lights (Museo dei Lumi) occupies an underground room formerly used for baking matzot and houses a growing collection of menorahs created by contemporary Jewish and non-Jewish artists including Elio Carmi, Emanuele Luzzati, Aldo Mondino, Gabriele Levy, Marco Porta, Tobia Ravà, Antonio Recalcati and David Gerstein.

== Archives ==
The archives include historical documents relating to the story of Jewish life in Casale and Monferrato, a collection of wedding contracts (ketubot) written on parchment and often richly decorated with drawings and symbols, the community registers, and a range of books printed between 1600 and 1900.
