= Vestido bajando la escalera =

Work of art in the IVAM collection

Vetsido bajando una escalera
- Costume descending stairs
- Artist: Eduardo Arroyo
- Year: 1976
- Location: Institut Valencià d'Art Modern

Vestido bajando la escalera is a painting by Eduardo Arroyo. It belongs to the collection of the Institut Valencià d'Art Modern, in València. It is part of the Blind Painters series.

Arroyo, who exiled himself in Paris during the 1960s and attempted to become a writer, switched into the painting in the 1970s. Alongside Gilles Aillaud and Antonio Recalcati, they collectively create the painting Vivre et laisser mourir ou la fin tragique de Marcel Duchamp, a work in eight pieces intended to criticize the contemporary French art. Vestido bajando la escalera was intended to be a continuation of the previous one, as well as a pop art counterpoint to Duchamp's Nu descendant un escalier. Unlike Duschamp's work, here the suit does not descend the stairs, but just seems to be floating, an scenery that has been regarded as criticism against the accommodation of art.
