= Biella Synagogue =

Orthodox synagogue in Biella, Italy

- Italian: Sinagoga di Biella
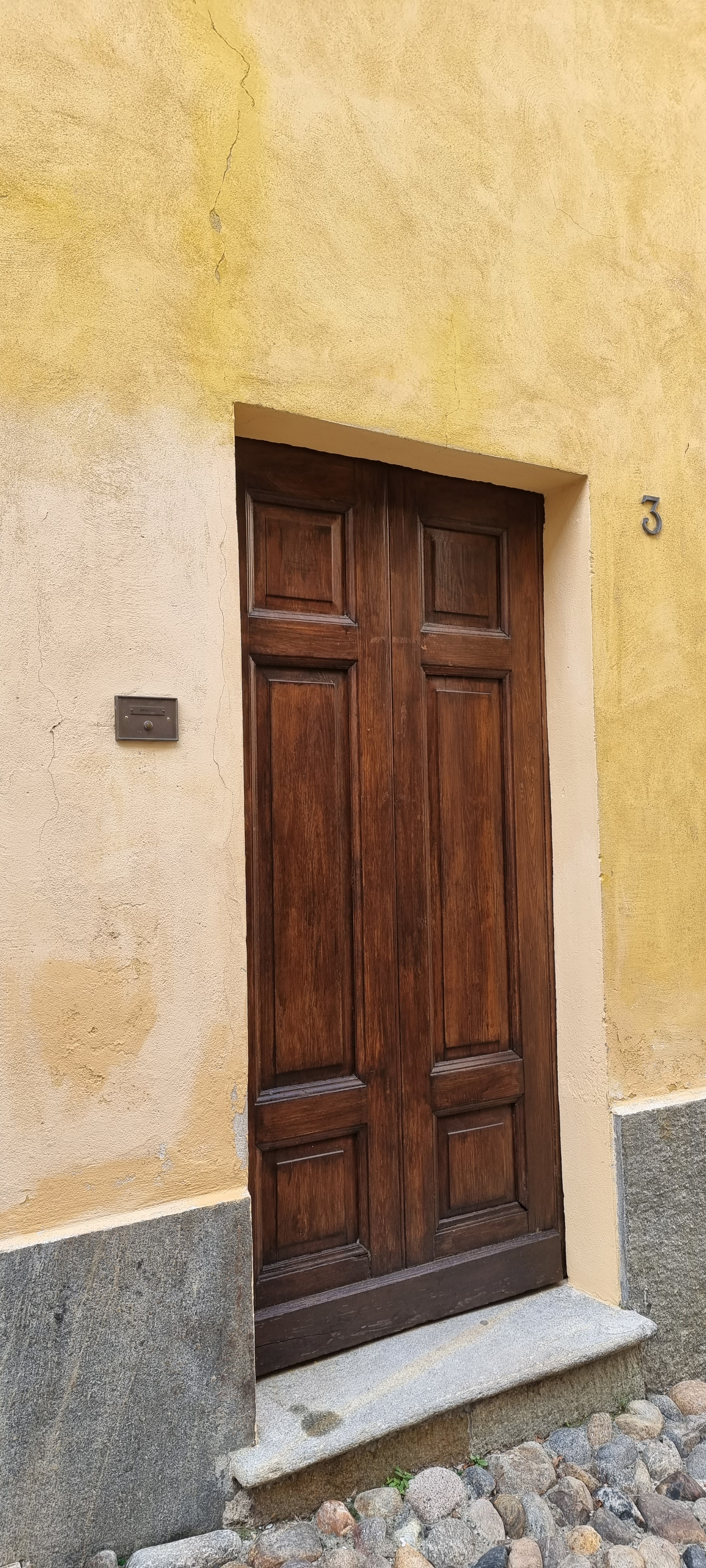
- The synagogue, in [YYYY]

- Location of the synagogue in Piedmont

Religion
- Affiliation: Judaism
- Rite: Italian rite
- Ecclesiastical or organizational status: Synagogue
- Status: Active

Location
- Location: Vicolo del Bellone 3, Biella, Piedmont
- Country: Italy
- Interactive map of Biella Synagogue
- Coordinates: 45°33′56″N 8°02′42″E

Architecture
- Type: Synagogue architecture
- Style: Baroque
- Completed: 1780
- Materials: Stone

The Biella Synagogue (Italian: Sinagoga di Biella) is a Jewish congregation and synagogue, that is located at Vicolo del Bellone 3, in Biella, Piedmont, Italy. The synagogue was completed in 1780.

== History ==
The synagogue occupies the top floor of a medieval house at Vicolo del Bellone 3, in the heart of the historic Jewish quarter. It is a modestly sized, rectangular room with Baroque decoration, a central bimah and an ornate, seventeenth century, baroque Torah Ark.

The synagogue possesses the oldest known Torah scroll still in use which dates to the 13th century.

In 2009 a 350,000 euro restoration, overseen by the Jewish community in Vercelli and funded from the Piedmont Region and by donations from a number of sources, including a local bank, completed the repair of the roof, and restoration of the Torah Ark, women's gallery and interior. Further restoration work is planned.

The Biella Synagogue is one of about sixteen that survive in Piedmont, including the Synagogue of Casale Monferrato and the Vercelli Synagogue.

== See also ==
- History of the Jews in Italy
- List of synagogues in Italy
