= Cervere =

- Comune
- Comune di Cervere
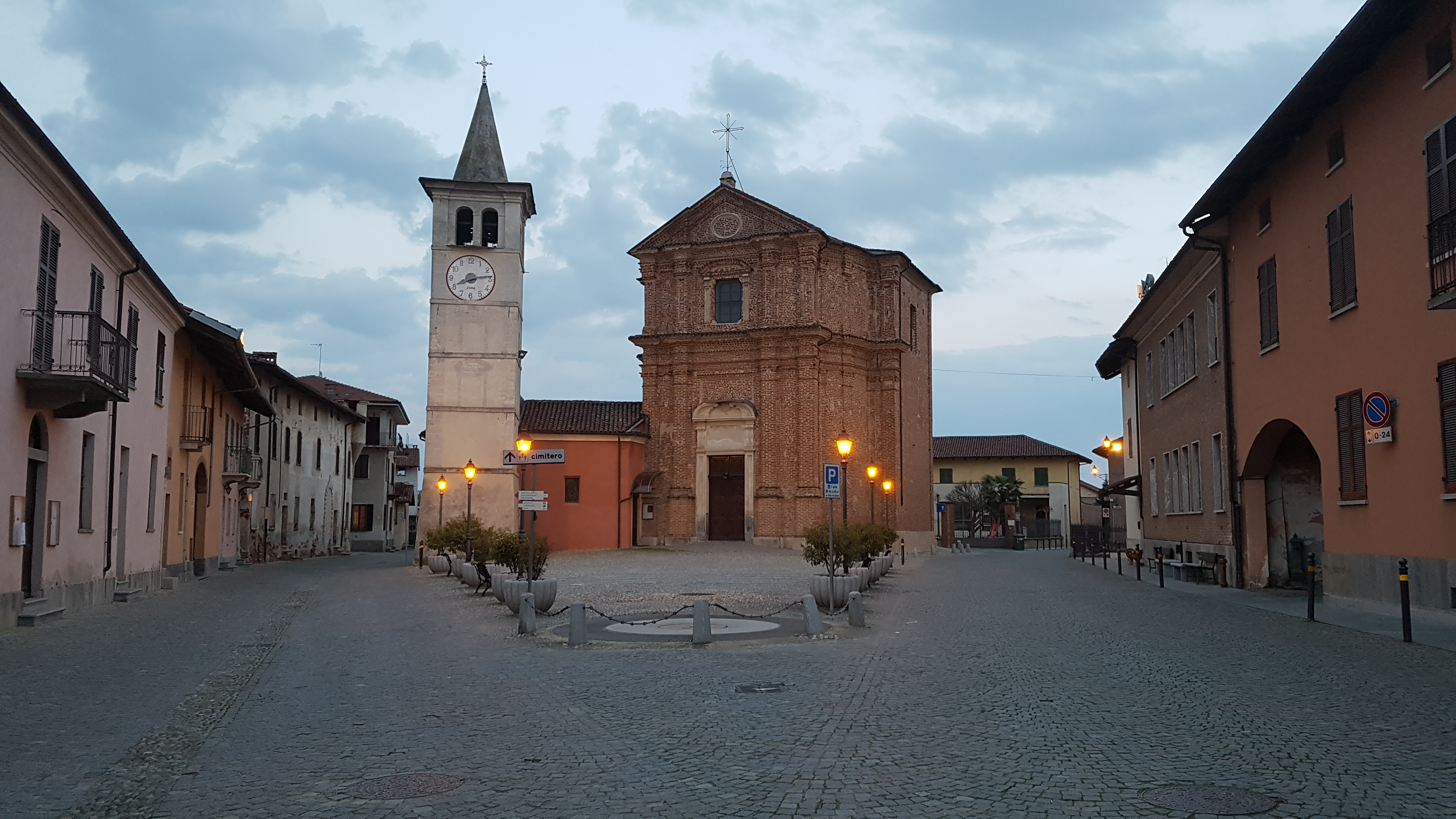

- Location within Italy Location within Piedmont
- Coordinates: 44°38′N 7°47′E
- Country: Italy
- Region: Piedmont
- Province: Cuneo (CN)
- Frazioni: Grinzano, Montarossa, Tetti Chiaramelli, Tetti Paglieri

Government
  - Mayor: Corrado Marchisio

Area
  - Total: 18.60 km^{2} (7.18 sq mi)
- Elevation: 301 m (988 ft)

Population (1-1-2021)
  - Total: 2,249
  - Density: 120.9/km^{2} (313.2/sq mi)
- Demonym: Cerverese(i)
- Time zone: UTC+1 (CET)
  - Summer (DST): UTC+2 (CEST)
- Postal code: 12040
- Dialing code: 0172
- Patron saint: Holy Cross
- Saint day: 14 September
- Website: Official website

Cervere is a comune (municipality) in the Province of Cuneo in the Italian region Piedmont, located about 50 kilometres (31 mi) south of Turin and about 35 kilometres (22 mi) northeast of Cuneo.

Cervere borders the following municipalities: Cherasco, Fossano, Marene, Salmour, and Savigliano.

It is known for a local cultivar of leek named for the town, "porro di Cervere".
