= Eduardo Arroyo =

Spanish painter and graphic artist (1937–2018)

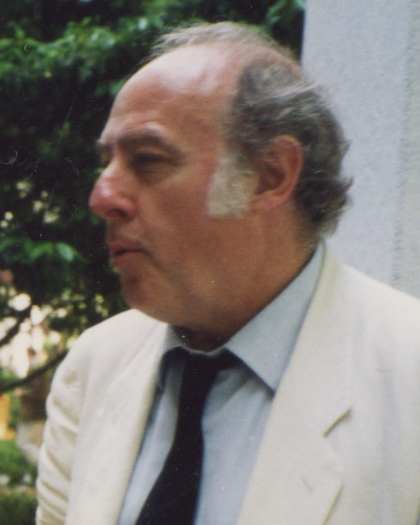

Eduardo Arroyo Rodríguez (26 February 1937 – 14 October 2018) was a Spanish painter and graphic artist. He was also active as an author and set designer. Arroyo is regarded as one of the most important exponents of politically committed realism.

== Biography ==
Arroyo was born in Madrid to a Leonese family and originally trained a journalist, graduating from School of Journalism, Madrid in 1957. Following his studies and growing contempt for the Francoist Spain, Arroyo emigrated to Paris at the age of 21. He originally began working as an author and journalist, but soon decided to devote himself to painting.

In Paris, he befriended members of the young art scene, especially Gilles Aillaud, with whom he later collaborated in creating stage sets, such as Vivre et laisser mourir ou la fin tragique de Marcel Duchamp, a work in eight pieces intended to criticize contemporary French art. He also befriended Joan Miró. In 1964, he made his breakthrough with his first important exhibition. He dominated the major post-Franco exhibition of Spanish art at the Venice Biennale of 1976. Over 20 years of critical and commercial success followed.

Stylistically, Arroyo's mostly ironic, colorful works are at the crossroads between the trends of nouvelle figuration or figuration narrative and pop art. A characteristic of his representations is the general absence of spatial depth and the flattening of perspective.

Arroyo also became known to a broad public through his many works as a set designer, as well as partially by his costume designs. In this relation, he cooperated since 1969 especially with the director Klaus Michael Grüber, who encouraged him in this activity. Arroyo created sets for, among others, the Piccolo Teatro in Milan, the Paris Opéra (in 1976, Richard Wagner's Die Walküre), the Schaubühne am Lehniner Platz in Berlin and the Salzburger Festspiele (in 1991, Leoš Janáček's Z mrtveho domu).

In 1982 he received Spain's National Award for Plastic Arts.

Arroyo's stage play, Bantam, premiered at the Bayerisches Staatsschauspiel (Residenztheater) in Munich with great success in 1986, with his friend, Grüber, as director and Ailland and Antonio Recalcati for sets and costumes.

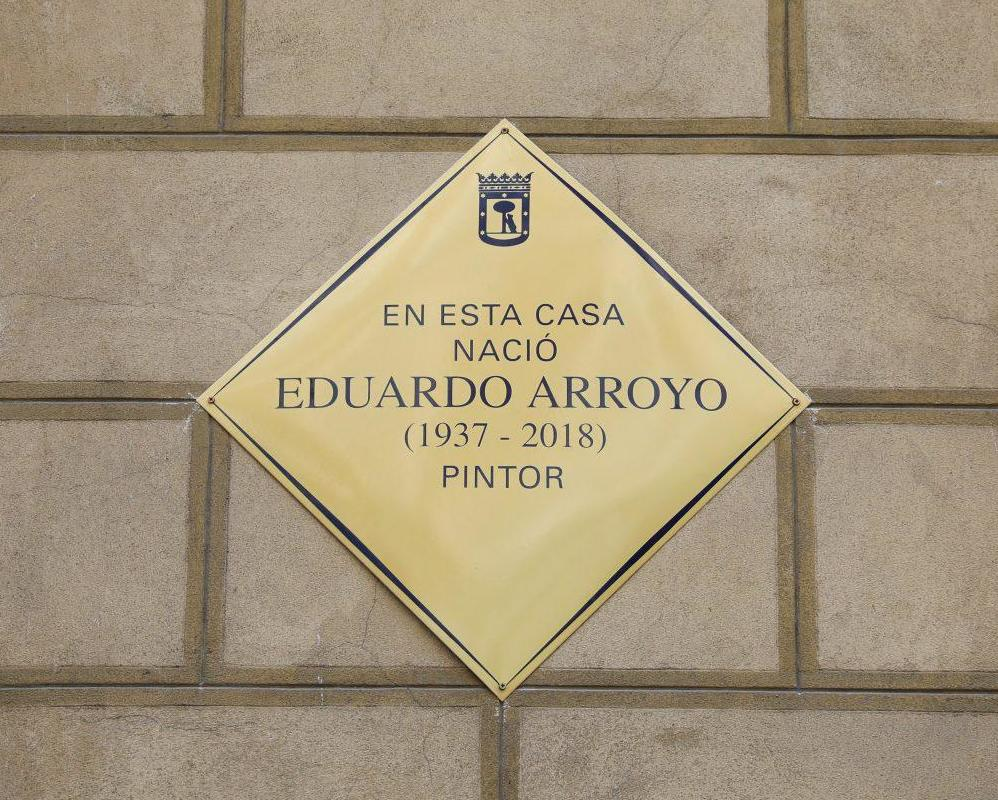
Commemorative plaque to Eduardo Arroyo in Madrid

Exhibiting since 1961, Arroyo's work has been shown in exhibitions across the globe, including the Neue Gesellschaft für Bildende Kunst, Berlin (1971); the Centre Pompidou, Paris (1982); Solomon R. Guggenheim Museum, NY (1984); Museum für Kunst und Kulturgeschichte, Dortmund, (1987); Institut Valencià d'Art Modern, Valencia (1989); Museo Nacional Centro de Arte Reina Sofía, Madrid (1998), and most recently held a solo exhibition at Fundación ENAIRE in Santander, Spain (2021–22). Arroyo's paintings are showcased at the Museo de Arte Contemporáneo in Madrid. His most renowned work, Vestido bajando la escalera, belongs to the collection of the Institut Valencià d'Art Modern, in València.
