= Visconti Castle (Cherasco) =

Castle in northern Italy

- Castello Visconteo di Cherasco
- Cherasco, Piedmont, Northern Italy
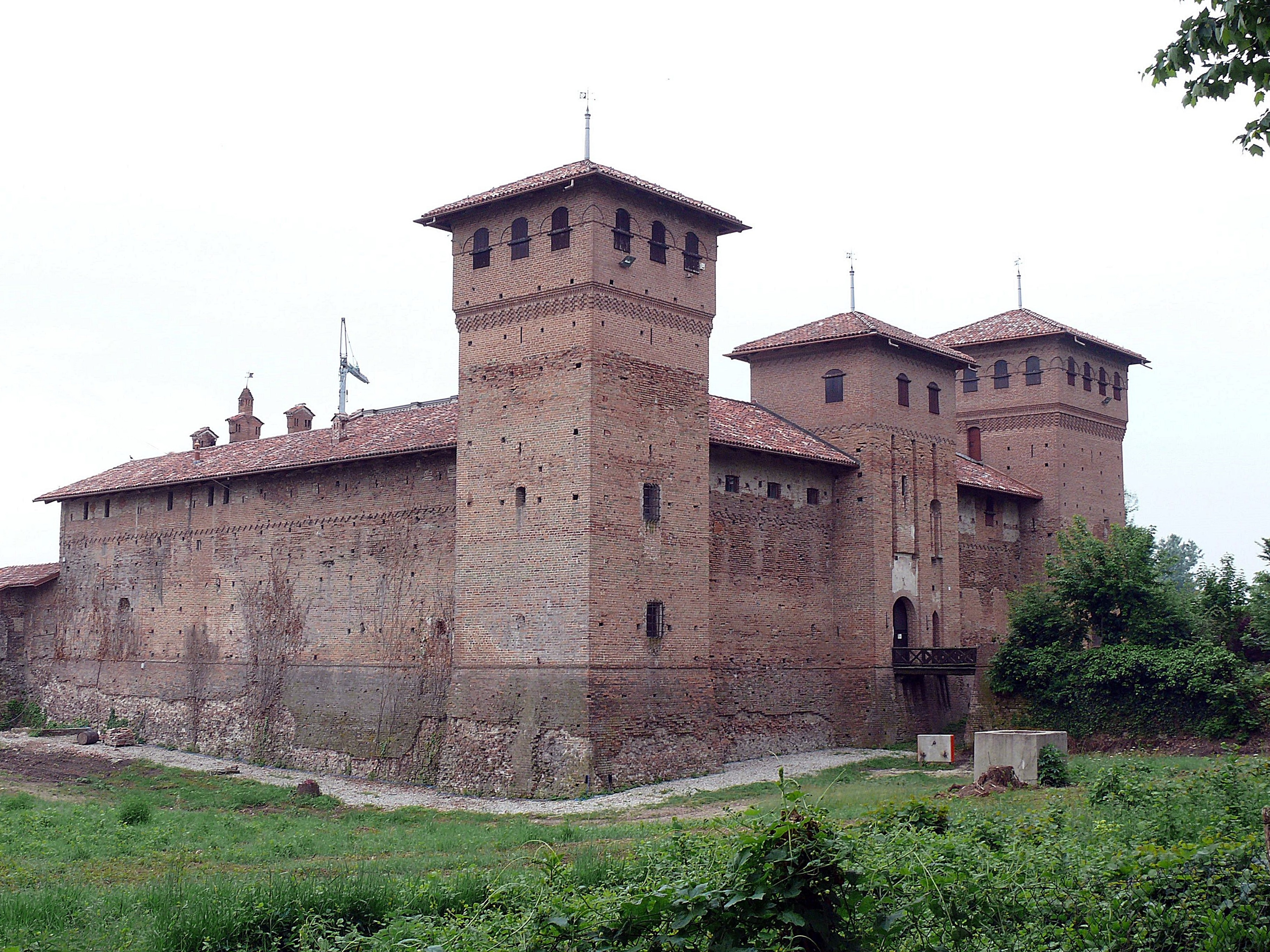
- View of the northwest corner

Site information
- Type: Medieval castle, residential estate
- Owner: Private
- Open to the public: No
- Condition: Good

Location
- Coordinates: 44°38′59″N 7°51′45″E

Site history
- Built: 1348, 20th century restoration
- Built by: Luchino Visconti
- Materials: Bricks

The Visconti Castle of Cherasco is a medieval castle in Cherasco, Piedmont, Northern Italy. It was built in the 14th century by Luchino Visconti, Lord of Milan, and partly reconstructed at the beginning of the 20th century.

== Location ==
Cherasco lies on a wedge-shaped plateau, a naturally protected area, where the rivers Stura di Demonte and Tanaro meet. The castle is located at the town's border, in a prominent position overlooking the two rivers' confluence.

== History ==
In the 13th century, during the communal era, the local Commune reinforced the stronghold that probably already existed on the current castle site. Later, Cherasco became part of the dominions of the Savoy house.

In 1348, the Lord of Milan, Luchino Visconti, defeated the Savoy and conquered Cherasco. He decided to fortify the city and ordered the erection of a new castle. Entirely constructed with bricks, it had a quadrangular structure with a tower at each corner and a smaller central tower with a drawbridge at the entrance, a frequent arrangement in the Visconti dominions.

Cherasco had an important role in the western Visconti territories. It appeared twice as a dowry in dynasty marriages: in 1368, when Violante Visconti married Lionel of Antwerp, Duke of Clarence, and in 1387 when Valentina Visconti married Louis I, Duke of Orléans.

Following the Treaty of Cateau-Cambrésis in 1559, the castle returned to the Savoy house. They used it as a refuge on several occasions to escape the plague in 1630 and the French in 1706. In 1691, Victor Amadeus II II of Savoy decided to concentrate the defense of his territories in a few strongholds suitable for the purpose. The castle of Cherasco was not among them. Accordingly, it was deliberately partially blown up to no longer serve as a military fortification. What remained of the ancient castle, reduced to semi-ruin, served as a barracks until 1815 and later as a farmhouse.

At the beginning of the 20th century, the castle passed to new owners, who almost wholly refurbished the building's surviving parts. They restored the walls with extensive insertions, elevated the towers, and redesigned the interior. The result was a partly reconstructed castle inside a residential estate with an Italian style garden.

== Today ==
The castle is privately owned and visitable only from the outside. The landscape beyond the building is visible as well. It is one of the several historical buildings of Cherasco.

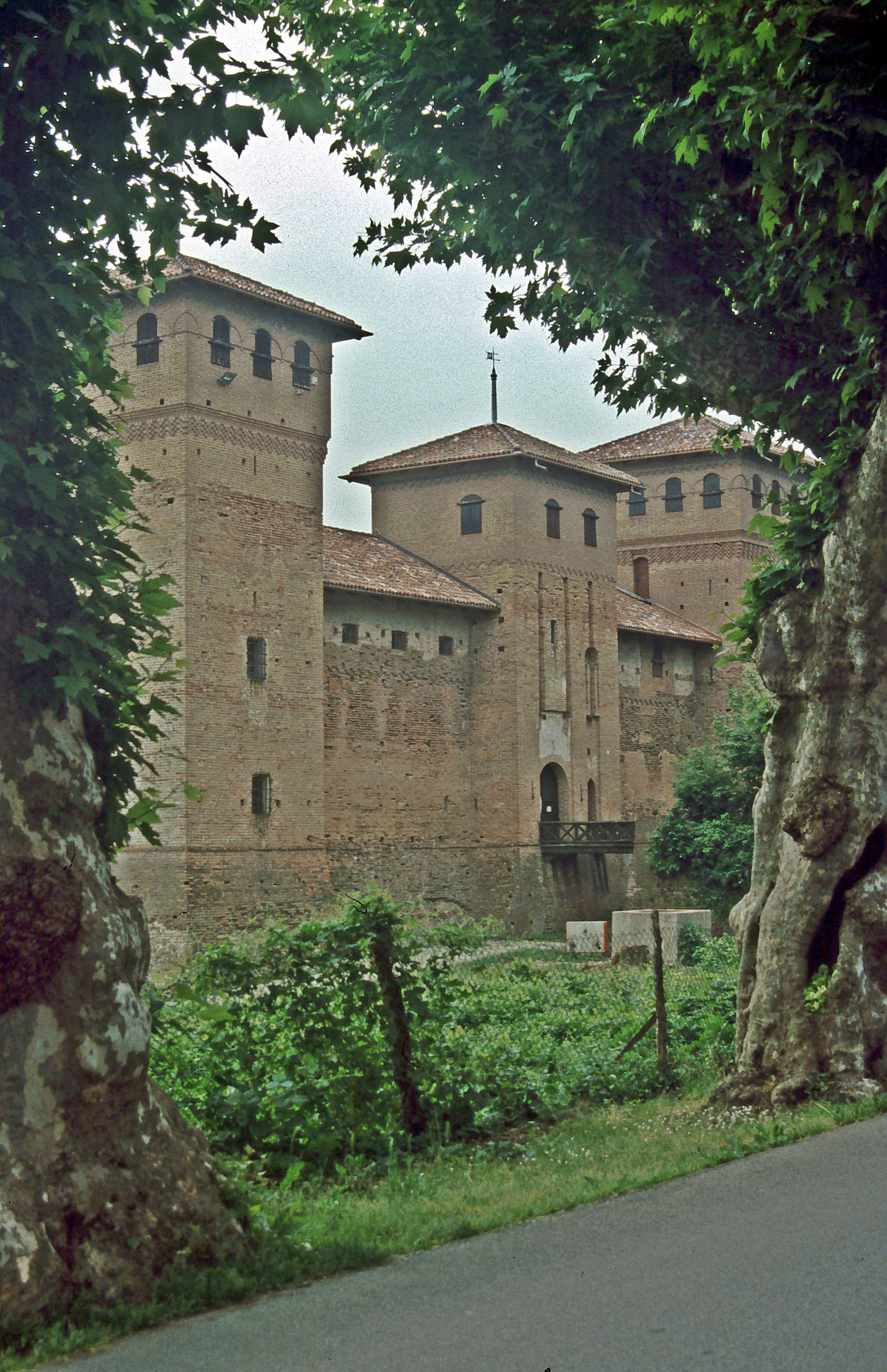
Facade

== Sources ==
- Conti, Flavio (1980). I castelli del Piemonte (in Italian). Vol. Tomo III. Novara: Istituto Geografico de Agostini. OCLC 1440237235.
- Voersio, Francesco (1618). Historia compendiosa di Cherasco posto in Piemonte sotto il felice dominio della Sereniss. Casa di Savoia (in Italian). Mondovì: Giovanni Cislandi. OCLC 560039066.
