= Pierre Bettencourt =

French writer and printer

- Born: 28 July 1917; Saint-Maurice-d'Ételan, France
- Died: 13 April 2006 (aged 88); Stigny, France
- Education: Collège de France

Pierre Bettencourt (28 July 1917 – 13 April 2006) was a French writer and printer.

== Biography ==
A writer and visual artist, Pierre Bettencourt published his first texts on his own hand press, in his family's German-occupied home in Saint-Maurice-d'Ételan.

Throughout his life, in addition to his own works, he also published works by Antonin Artaud, Francis Ponge, Henri Michaux, Bernard Collin and Jean Dubuffet. He also wrote under his own name, but also under a pseudonym. For example, he signed his erotic works Jean Sadinet.

From 1941 onwards, he devoted himself to Typography and published, still on his press, his first books with Colophon (publishing) that were often singular, poetic or sarcastic, as well as unpublished texts by Henri Michaux (Tu vas être père), Antonin Artaud (Le Théâtre de Séraphin), his friend Dubuffet (Plukifekler), Francis Ponge (Le Galet) and others. He didn't hesitate to call on the biggest names to illustrate the books he published, while refusing to be pressured by the media.

In 1953, after a stay at Saint-Michel-de-Chaillol with Jean Dubuffet, Bettencourt created his first Relief, using unconventional materials (slate fragments, coffee beans, eggshells, etc.) on painted backgrounds to give the figures their singular texture and unsettling thickness.

Essentially erotic, these works are Outsider art. They express the mysterious and sacred nature of life, while at the same time revealing the artist's fantasies with innocent crudity.

Bettencourt was one of the contemporary artists exhibited (and collected) by Daniel Cordier in the 1950s-1960s.

Pierre Bettencourt had lived in Stigny since 1963. He was married to Monique Apple.
