= Salmour =

- Comune
- Comune di Salmour
- Location within Italy Location within Piedmont
- Coordinates: 44°35′N 7°48′E
- Country: Italy
- Region: Piedmont
- Province: Cuneo (CN)

Government
  - Mayor: Gian Franco Sineo

Area
  - Total: 12.7 km^{2} (4.9 sq mi)
- Elevation: 391 m (1,283 ft)

Population (31 December 2010)
  - Total: 725
  - Density: 57.1/km^{2} (148/sq mi)
- Demonym: Salmouresi
- Time zone: UTC+1 (CET)
  - Summer (DST): UTC+2 (CEST)
- Postal code: 12040
- Dialing code: 0172
- Website: Official website

Salmour is a comune (municipality) in the Province of Cuneo in the Italian region Piedmont, located about 50 kilometres (31 mi) south of Turin and about 30 kilometres (19 mi) northeast of Cuneo. Salmour borders the following municipalities: Bene Vagienna, Cervere, Cherasco, Fossano, and Narzole.

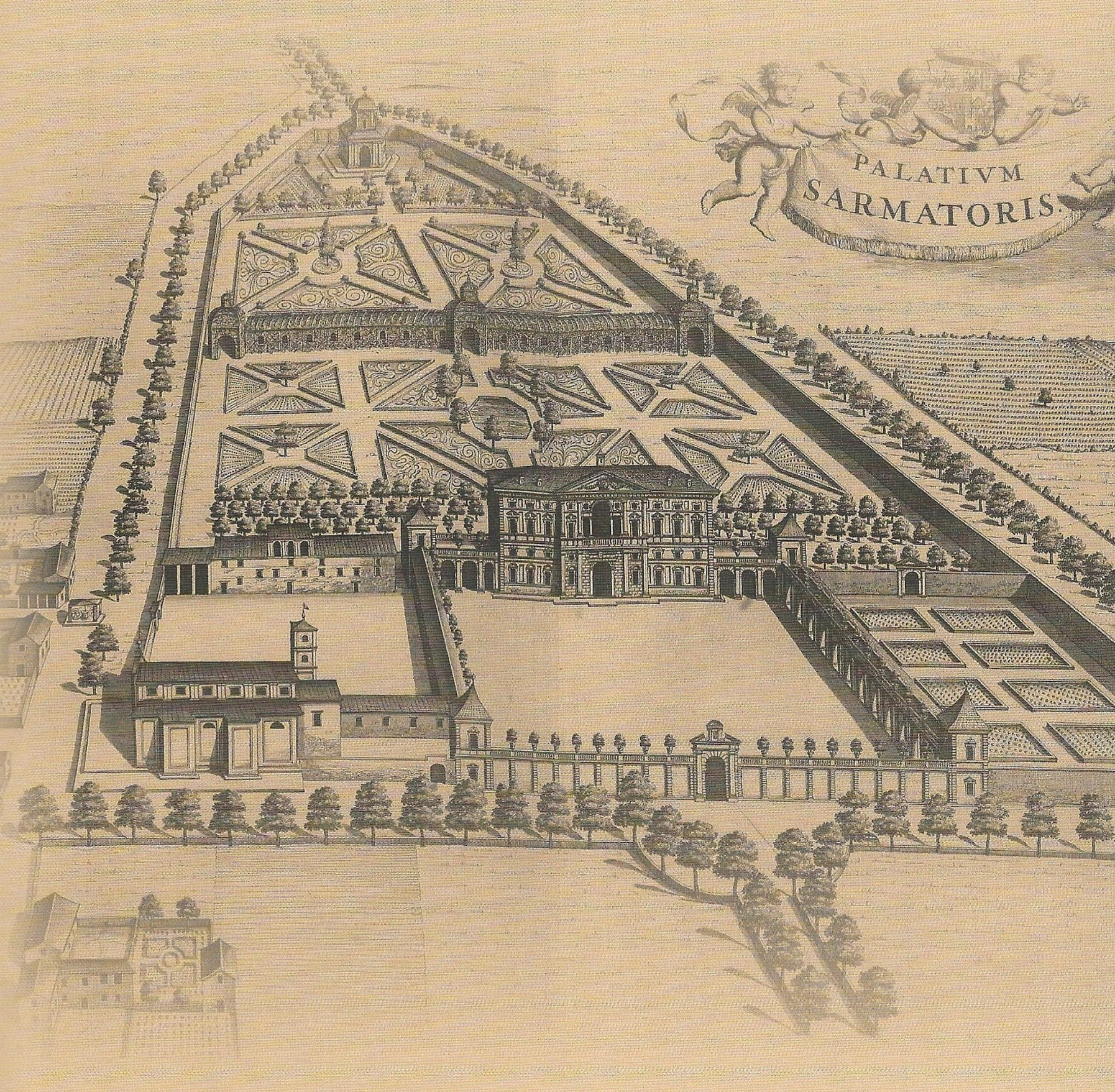
