= Bologna Torah Scroll =

12th-century Hebrew manuscript from Bologna, Italy

The Bologna Torah Scroll (also known as the University of Bologna Torah Scroll, circa 1155–1225 CE) is the world's oldest complete extant Torah scroll. The scroll contains the full text of the five Books of Moses in Hebrew and is kosher.

== Background ==
The scroll was discovered at the University of Bologna's library by Mauro Perani, a professor of Hebrew. While updating the university's catalogue, Perani came across a Torah scroll that he believed to have been erroneously dated to the 17th century after a textual analysis. Two independent carbon-dating tests were performed (one at the University of Sorrento and another at the University of Illinois Urbana-Champaign) and indicated that the scroll was actually written between the second half of the 12th century to the beginning of the 13th century.

== Features ==
The scroll measures 36 meters by 64 cm (39 yards by 25 inches) and is made of sheepskin.
