= Cherasco =

Cherasco Cherasch
- Comune
- Comune di Cherasco
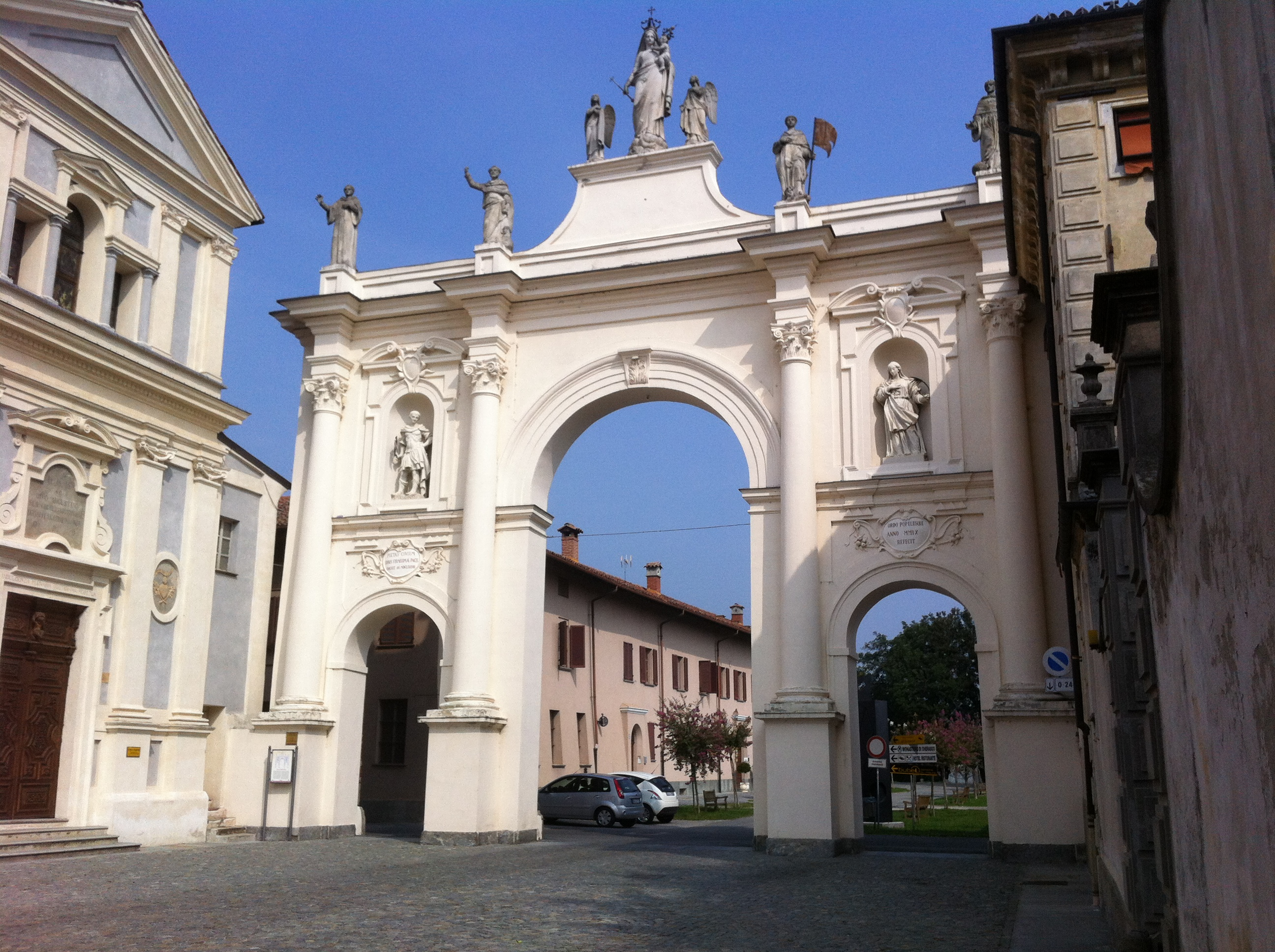

- Location within Italy Location within Piedmont
- Coordinates: 44°39′N 7°52′E
- Country: Italy
- Region: Piedmont
- Province: Province of Cuneo (CN)
- Frazioni: Bricco de' Faule, Roreto, Barali, Bernocchi, Cappellazzo, Carena, Corno, Furno, Ghidone, Gianoglio, Giardina, Gombe, Meane, Picchi, San Bartolomeo, San Giovanni, San Gregorio, San Martino, Sant'Antonino, Sant'Antonio, Tetti Lelli, Veglia

Government
  - Mayor: Carlo Davico

Area
  - Total: 81.54 km^{2} (31.48 sq mi)
- Elevation: 288 m (945 ft)

Population (1 January 2021)
  - Total: 9,383
  - Density: 115.1/km^{2} (298.0/sq mi)
- Demonym: Cheraschese(i)
- Time zone: UTC+1 (CET)
  - Summer (DST): UTC+2 (CEST)
- Postal code: 12062
- Dialing code: 0172
- Website: Official website

Cherasco is a comune (municipality) in the Province of Cuneo in the Italian region Piedmont, located about 50 kilometres (31 mi) southeast of Turin and about 40 kilometres (25 mi) northeast of Cuneo. As of 1 January 2017, it had a population of 9096 and an area of 81.2 square kilometres (31.4 mi^{2}).

The municipality of Cherasco contains the frazioni (subdivisions, mainly villages and hamlets) of Bricco de' Faule, Cappellazzo, Meane, Roreto, San Bartolomeo, San Giovanni, Sant'Antonio and Veglia.

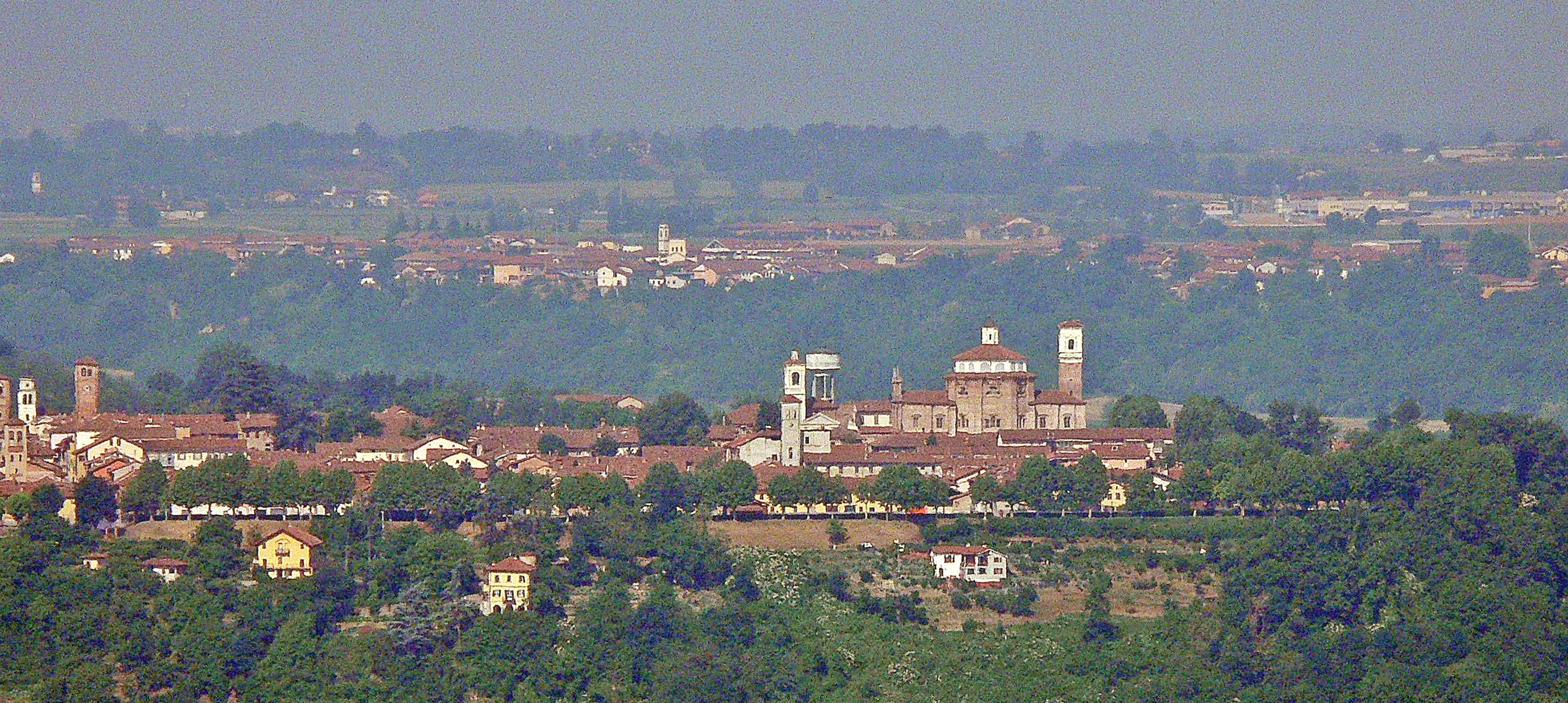

Cherasco borders the following municipalities: Bra, Cavallermaggiore, Cervere, La Morra, Marene, Narzole, and Salmour.

The Cherasco Synagogue in the old Jewish ghetto has a notable Baroque Torah ark and bimah. It was built by a man named DiBenedetti and 51 Jewish families in the 1700s.

The medieval Visconti Castle was built in the 14th century by Luchino Visconti, Lord of Milan, and partly reconstructed at the beginning of the 20th century.

On 28 April 1796 an armistice was signed at Cherasco between Victor Amadeus III of Sardinia and Napoleon Bonaparte.

== Demographic evolution ==
Historical population

Year	Pop.	±%
1861	8,592	—
1871	8,991	+4.6%
1881	9,515	+5.8%
1901	9,077	−4.6%
1911	9,312	+2.6%

Year	Pop.	±%
1921	8,819	−5.3%
1931	8,846	+0.3%
1936	8,388	−5.2%
1951	7,716	−8.0%
1961	6,359	−17.6%

Year	Pop.	±%
1971	6,052	−4.8%
1981	6,254	+3.3%
1991	6,503	+4.0%
2001	7,208	+10.8%

Source: Data from ISTAT

== Twin towns – sister cities ==
Cherasco is twinned with:

- Villars-sur-Var, France (1981)
- Möckmühl, Germany (2001)
- Piliscsaba, Hungary (2005)
- Cefa, Romania (2006)
- Aksakovo, Bulgaria (2009)

== See also ==
- BRC Racing Team
- Treaty of Cherasco (April-June 1631)

== Sources ==
- Conti, Flavio (1980). I castelli del Piemonte. Tomo III (in Italian). Novara: Istituto Geografico De Agostini.
