= Stigny =

- Commune
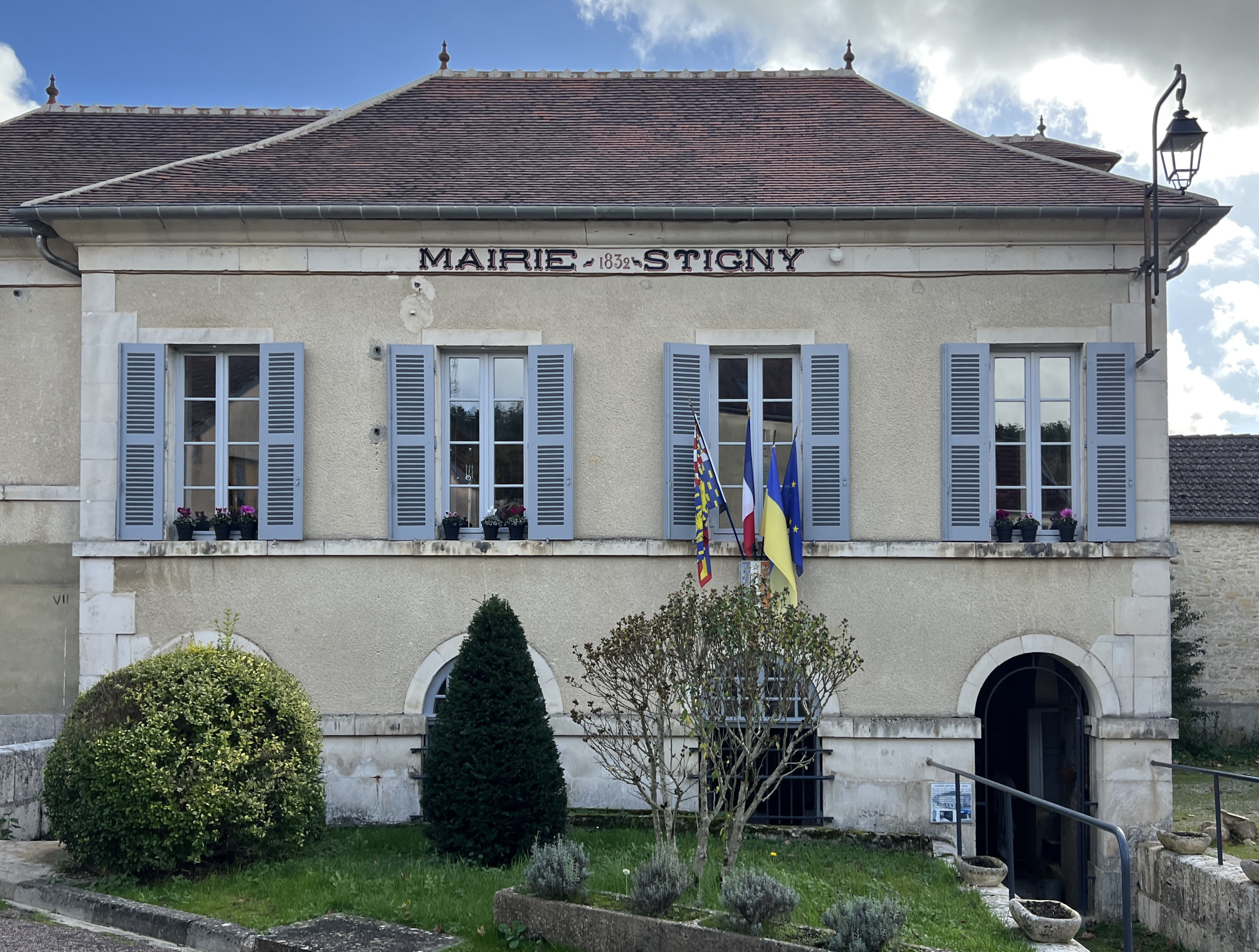
- Stigny Town hall
- Location of Stigny
- Location within France Location within Bourgogne-Franche-Comté
- Coordinates: 47°46′29″N 4°14′01″E
- Country: France
- Region: Bourgogne-Franche-Comté
- Department: Yonne
- Arrondissement: Avallon
- Canton: Tonnerrois

Government
  - Mayor (2020–2026): Anne Dollier
- Area^{1}: 17.86 km^{2} (6.90 sq mi)
- Highest elevation: 328 m (1,076 ft)
- Lowest elevation: 208 m (682 ft)
- Population (2023): 89
  - Density: 5.0/km^{2} (13/sq mi)
- Time zone: UTC+01:00 (CET)
  - Summer (DST): UTC+02:00 (CEST)
- INSEE/Postal code: 89403 /89160
- ^{1} French Land Register data, which excludes lakes, ponds, glaciers > 1 km^{2} (0.386 sq mi or 247 acres) and river estuaries.

Stigny (French pronunciation: [stiɲi]) is a commune in the Yonne department in Bourgogne-Franche-Comté in north-central France.

== See also ==
- Communes of the Yonne department
