= Antonio Recalcati =

Italian painter and sculptor (1938–2022)

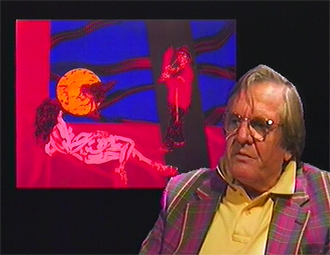
- Recalcati in 1995
- Born: 2 May 1938; Bresso, Italy
- Died: 4 December 2022 (aged 84); Milan, Italy
- Occupation(s): Painter; Sculptor

Antonio Recalcati (2 May 1938 – 4 December 2022) was an Italian painter and sculptor.

== Biography ==
In 1960, Recalcati moved to Milan and met the poet and critic Alain Jouffroy, who first noticed his work. From 1960 to 1962, he exhibited his works in Venice and Brussels, which gravitated informal space and Impronte.Jouffroy, Alain (1975). Les empreintes de recalcati 1960-1962 (in French). Christian Bourgois. In 1963, he moved to Paris, where he met the painters Gilles Aillaud, Eduardo Arroyo, and Paul Rebeyrolle. In 1965, alongside Aillaud and Arroyo, he published a collective work titled Vivre et laisser mourir ou la Fin tragique de Marcel Duchamp. The three painters documented the rise and imaginary fall of Marcel Duchamp.

During the 1970s, Recalcati's paintings tackled the themes of social commitment and repression in subject such as student struggles and the working class outskirts of large cities. Between 1965 and 1971, he took multiple trips to New York, Venezuela, Mexico, Cuba, Brazil, and East Asia. In 1980, he moved to New York City, where he lived until the summer of 1985. In 1990, he began working with ceramics following his stay in Albissola Marina and manufactured a series of 656 vases. His portraits of imaginary New York City landscapes continued until the end of the 1980s with the series After Storm, presented at the Galleria Philippe Daverio in Milan in 1988.

In 1992, Recalcati began his career in sculpture while he was living in Carrara, producing a series of terracotta sculptures. However, he returned to painting in 1996 and produced a series of large canvasses while staying in Morocco.

Antonio Recalcati died in Milan on 4 December 2022, at the age of 84.
