= Vercelli Synagogue =

Synagogue in Vercelli, Italy

- Italian: Tempio Israelitico
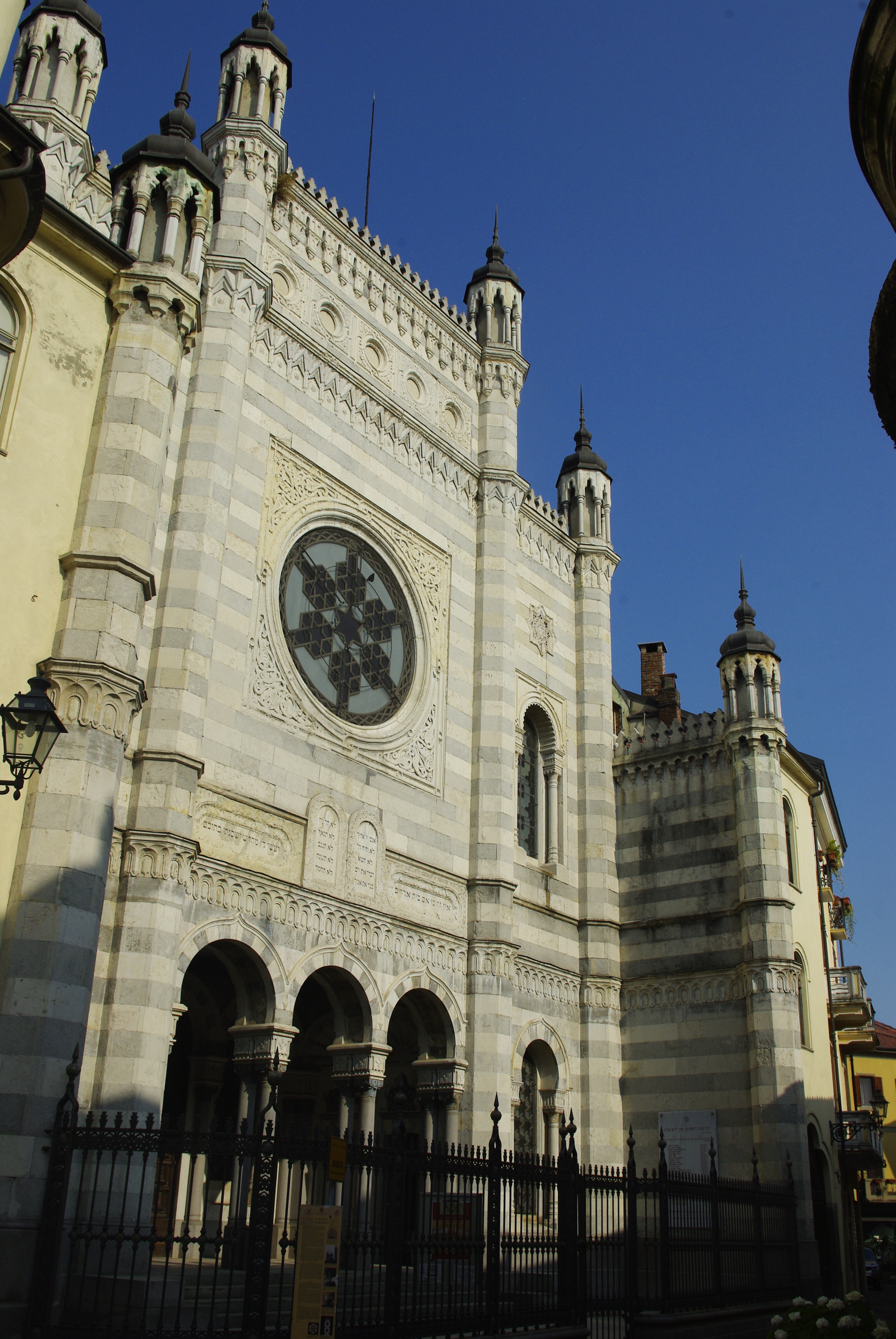
- The synagogue, in 2013

- Location of the synagogue in Piedmont

Religion
- Affiliation: Orthodox Judaism
- Rite: Nusach Ashkenaz; Italki
- Ecclesiastical or organizational status: Synagogue
- Status: Active

Location
- Location: Via Foà 70, Vercelli, Piedmont
- Country: Italy
- Interactive map of Vercelli Synagogue
- Coordinates: 45°19′32.69″N 8°25′33.1″E

Architecture
- Architect: Marco Treves
- Type: Synagogue architecture
- Style: Moorish Revial
- Completed: 1878
- Materials: Brick

Website
- vercelliebraica.jimdo.com (in Italian)

The Vercelli Synagogue (Italian: Tempio Israelitico) is an Orthodox Jewish congregation and synagogue, located at Via Foà 70, in Vercelli, Italy. Designed in the Moorish Revial style by Marco Treves, an architect born in Vercelli who also designed the Great Synagogue of Florence, the synagogue was completed in 1878.

== History ==
The synagogue features red-and-white masonry courses and a flat, tripartite facade with a raised central portion, that resembles a number of other European and American synagogues with designs inspired by Vienna's Leopoldstädter Tempel, by architect Ludwig Förster.

A major restoration project was launched in 2007.

On 23 November 2013, in an antisemitic act, two swastikas were found sprayed on its walls.

== See also ==
- History of the Jews in Italy
- List of synagogues in Italy
