= Gilles Aillaud =

French painter

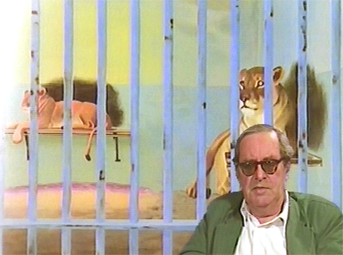
- Born: 1928
- Died: 24 March 2005 (aged 76–77); Paris

Gilles Aillaud (French pronunciation: [ʒil ajo]; 1928 in Paris – 24 March 2005 in Paris) was an internationally known French painter, set decorator, and scenographer; as well, he was one of the main proponents of the Nouvelle Figuration and Figuration Narrative schools of art. He primarily painted animals, being best known for large canvases of zoo animals in which humans are invisible but strongly present, but also producing pictures of African wildlife in their natural environment. Aillaud was president of the Salon de la Jeune Peinture in 1964 and in 1968 painted "La bataille du riz" (in French), a depiction of an American soldier being held prisoner by the Vietnamese.
