= List of Italian locations of Jewish history =

This is a list of Italian locations of Jewish history. The first Jews arrived in Italy more than 2000 years ago and to this day have an unbroken presence in Italy. Today, Italian Jews can be found nearly all regions of Italy.

== Northern Italy ==
- Acqui
- Alessandria
- Ancona
- Aquileia
- Arezzo
- Asti
- Bassano
- Bergamo
- Bologna
- Bolzano
- Bozzolo
- Brescia
- Cento
- Cesena
- Como
- Conegliano
- Cremona
- Cuneo
- Emilia-Romagna
- Faenza
- Florence
- Forlì
- Fossano
- Genoa
- Gorizia
- Imola
- Livorno
- Lodi
- Lombardy
- Lucca
- Lugo
- Mantua
- Merano
- Milan
- Modena
- Moncalvo
- Padua
- Pavia
- Pisa
- Reggio Emilia
- Sabbioneta
- San Daniele Del Friuli
- Siena
- Trent
- Treviso
- Trieste
- Turin
- Tuscany
- Venice
- Vercelli
- Vincenza
- Vittorio Veneto

== Central Italy ==
- Amalfi
- Aquila
- Ascoli Piceno
- Benevento
- Capua
- Fano
- Ferrara
- Gaeta
- Lavello
- Matera
- Naples
- Orvieto
- Ostia
- Papal States
- Perugia
- Pesaro
- Piacenza
- Piove di Sacco
- Pitigliano
- Pompeii
- Ravenna
- Rome
- Salerno
- Spoleto
- Urbino
- Viterbo

== Southern Italy ==
- Agrigento
- Alghero
- Apulia
- Bari
- Brindisi
- Calabria
- Catania
- Catanzaro
- Cosenza
- Messina
- Oria
- Otranto
- Reggio Calabria
- San Nicandro Garganico
- Sardinia
- Sicily
- Syracuse
- Palermo
- Taranto
- Trani
