= History of the Jews in Campania and Basilicata =

The History of the Jews in Campania and Basilicata is at least 2000 years old. This area, which is a mix of mountains and rich fertile plains, is south of Rome, north of Calabria and west of Apulia. Most of the Jewish communities were settled in the Roman Era by Jewish merchants or by Jewish captives after the fall of Jerusalem in the year 70. However, the region was mostly abandoned by the Jews by middle of the 16th century. Today, only the city of Naples has a Jewish population. And, unlike in other southern areas, there seems to be no interest by neofiti descendants to revive the Jewish faith.

== Basilicata ==
=== Matera ===
The Jews lived in the region of Matera in a section behind the Lanfranchi Seminary. Later known as the Seminary Ghetto. The town of Aliano, located in Potenza, is the setting of the Jewish author, Carlo Levi's memoir, Christ Stopped at Eboli. The regions of Apulia, Calabria and Basilicata remained firmly under Byzantine control until the 11th century.

=== Venosa ===
The town of Venosa, is located east of Naples and just outside Campania. The Jews settled in this Roman colony before the 3rd century. Many Jewish inscriptions were discovered there. Fifty-four epitaphs from a Jewish catacomb have been studied. They date from the third to the sixth centuries and are composed in Greek, Latin, and Hebrew. By the 1970s more inscriptions were discovered including 23 epitaphs belonging to a cemetery. All are in Hebrew and date from the ninth century. The 11th-century Chronicle of Ahimaaz reads of an envoy of a Torah academy in Jerusalem who came to Venosa. He stayed and taught the Midrash in the town. In 1041, after the conquest of the town by the Normans, the Jews abandoned the area.

=== Lavello ===
Lavello is a small town with a modest sized historical settlement of Jews. Like, Venosa, a few Jewish tomb inscriptions are known to exist. The Jewish population was engaged in trade and moneylending. The Jews emigrated from the area in the sixteenth century.

== Campania ==
=== Amalfi ===
The port town of Amalfi is located in the Gulf of Salerno, southeast of Naples. The first records for the Jews living in Amalfi dates from the tenth century. The Chronicle of Ahimaaz mentions the Jews of Amalfi. The famous Cairo Geniza also mentions the Jews of Amalfi. The Jews of Amalfi were a small community, engaged in silk manufacture, garment dyeing and trade. Benjamin of Tudela writes of some 20 Jewish families there in about 1159. In 1292, measures were taken to convert the Jews to Christianity. Most Jews were banished along with the rest of the Jews in the area. The Jewish community in Amalfi was resurrected by 1306. However it finally ended when the Jews were banished again from the kingdom of Naples in 1541.

=== Benevento ===
The town of Benevento is located in central Campania. Inscriptions in the town indicate that Jews resideded in Benevento in the 5th century. Around the year 950, Aaron of Baghdad visited the town. Hananeel ben Paltiel founded a yeshivah in the area. In 1065, the Prince of Benevento oversaw a number of Jews being forced to convert to Christianity, and was reproved by Pope Alexander II. In about 1159, Benjamin of Tudela recorded 200 Jewish families living in Benevento. Two Hebrew inscriptions on a sepulchral stone from 1153 also attest to the existence of a Jewish community in this period. Jewish trade and craftmanship included dyeing and weaving and later, moneylending. By the early 16th century they also traded corn. In 1442, Alfonso of Aragon became the ruler of the area and granted some privileges to the Jews. However, in 1458, after Alfonso's death, Benevento returned to pontifical rule. Under Papal rule, Benevento was spared the Jewish expulsion from southern Italy by the Spanish Crown in 1541. Unfortunately, after the election of Pope Paul IV in 1555, the Jews felt increasing pressure to convert and several Jews did convert, among them a Jew by the name of Raphael Usiglio. In 1569 the Jews were expelled from Benevento as well as the other small towns under Papal rule. The Jews returned to Benevento in 1617, but in 1630 they were expelled for the last time, and never to return again.

=== Capua ===
The town of Capua, is north of Naples. The Jewish community dates back to the end of the Roman Empire. The Jews continued to live there after the area fell to the Byzantines. The Jewish community flourished in the 10th century, and the ancestors of Ahimaaz ben Paltiel were prominent within it. Paltiel ben Samuel (born in 988) was in charge of the finances of the town. And his son, Samuel ben Hananel was appointed supervisor of the treasury and the mint of Capua. Around 1167 when Benjamin of Tudela arrived in Capua, he recorded 300 Jews living there. In 1231, Emperor Frederick II granted the Jews the monopoly of the dye-works in the area. During the Jewish persecutions in southern Italy in 1290–94, many Jews in Capua were forcibly baptized to Christianity. From the 13th to 15th century, the Jewish community in Capua was known for its bankers and physicians. In 1464 the Jews of area, including Capua, complained to King Alfonso about the burden of taxation taxes were so large that many Jews threatened to leave the kingdom. The king obliged and lowed the taxes. The Jewish community grew when Sephardic refugees from Spain and Sicily arrived in Capua in 1492 and 1493. However, the Jews of Capua suffered their own expulsion, by the Kingdom of Naples in 1510. A few Jews resided there in the following decades, but the last few Jews were finally expelled in 1541.

=== Naples ===
The history of the Jews in Naples go back to around the 1st century under the Romans. By the 6th century, the Jewish community of Naples was under rule of the Byzantines. In 1159, when Benjamin of Tudela visited the city, he noted the presence of 500 Jewish families. In 1288, the Kingdom of Naples issued an expulsion order for the Jews and in 1293 any Jews still in Naples were forced to convert.

In 1492, many Jews who were expelled from Spain came to Naples, where King Ferdinand of Naples protected them. However, in 1495, the French conquered the kingdom and persecution resumed. In 1510, Spain won control of the city and expelled the Jews, but those who paid 300 ducanti were permitted to stay. In 1535, the last Jews in Naples were gone. In 1735, Jews were permitted to return to Naples. In 1831, a small group of Jews settled in the city. By 1841, the Rothschild family, acquired the Villa Pignatelli which served as the Jewish centre.

Naples's Jewish population in the 1920s were almost 1,000 members. Between 1942 and 1943, 50 Jews of Naples were saved from German deportation by being hidden by villagers in the area of Caserta. After World War II, the Jewish community of Naples numbered between 600 and 700. Today, the city's Jewish population numbers about 200.

=== Pompeii ===
Archeological records have proven the existence of a Jewish population in Pompeii, Herculaneum and Stabia prior to the infamous eruption of Mount Vesuvius in the year 79. Most of the records are of Jewish inscriptions that hint of Jewish life in the area. For example, one inscription reads Sodom Gomor. Some archeologists believe this inscription is a commentary about the wrath of God brought down upon Rome for the destruction of the Second Temple in Jerusalem by Rome in the year 70.

=== Salerno ===
The city of Salerno is located south of Naples. An inscription on a tombstone testifies to a Jewish settlement in Salerno, possibly as early as the 3rd or 4th century. By the Middle Ages, the town was known for a medical school founded by Jews around the year 800. Jews are mentioned in town records in 872. The Jewish quarter of Salerno is also mentioned in 1005. When Benjamin of Tudela visited Salerno in 1159, he found 600 Jews living in the area. Because of the persecutions in southern Italy around 1290–94, many Jewish families were forcibly baptized as Neofiti. However many Neofiti continued along as Crypto-Jews. In 1485, Rabbi Obadiah ben Abraham lived in Salerno and studied at the medical school. The expulsion of the Jews from the Kingdom of Naples in 1510 ended Jewish community of Salerno. In 1941, Italian fascists built the Campagna concentration camp located in Salerno. The Fascists abandoned the camp in 1943 and the inmates were allowed to go free.

== Molise ==
Except for a small Jewish internment camp built in Casacalenda by the Italian fascists in the early 1940s, there is little Jewish history in this area.

== See also ==
=== History of the Jews in Italy by region ===
- History of the Jews in Apulia
- History of the Jews in Calabria
- History of the Jews in Livorno
- History of the Jews in Naples
- History of the Jews in Sardinia
- History of the Jews in Sicily
- History of the Jews in Trieste
- History of the Jews in Turin
- History of the Jews in Venice

== Sources ==
- Kreutz, Barbara (1996). Before the Normans: Southern Italy in the Ninth and Tenth Centuries. University of Pennsylvania Press.
