= History of the Jews in Calabria =

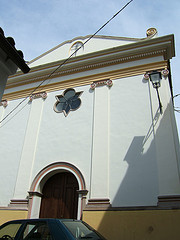
Former Synagogue in old Jewish Quarter of Nicastro

The history of the Jews in Calabria reaches back over two millennia. Calabria (Hebrew: קלבריה) is at the very south of the Italian peninsula, to which it is connected by the Monte Pollino massif, while on the east, south and west it is surrounded by the Ionian and Tyrrhenian seas. Jews have had a presence in Calabria for at least 1600 years and possibly as much as 2300 years. Calabrian Jews have had notable influence on many areas of Jewish life and culture. The Jews of Calabria are virtually identical to the neighbouring Jews of Sicily but are considered separate. However, the Jews of Calabria and the Jews of Apulia are historically the same community, only today are considered separate. Occasionally, there is confusion with the southern Jewish community in Calabria and the northern Jewish community in Reggio Emilia. Both communities have always been entirely separate.

== Early history ==
The history of the Jews in Calabria is presumed to date back several centuries before the common era. While there is evidence of Hellenized Jews living in the Greek colonies of Magna Graecia, there is no direct evidence of a Jewish presence in Calabria, then known as Bruttium, until much later. However, legends state that many Jewish captive slaves were brought to Calabria after the destruction of the Temple in Jerusalem in the year 70. Other legends state that it was the Hellenized Jews from Egypt who introduced the Etrog to Calabria during the time of Magna Graecia. In fact, the prized Etrog known as the Diamante Citron also known as the, "Yanover Esrog", is still grown in Calabria to this day. The Calabrian town of Santa Maria del Cedro still features their Etrog heritage in its place name. It is believed by some Jews, especially the Chabad-Lubavitch, that Moses used a Calabrian Etrog during the first holiday of Sukkot. A Kosher Liqueur made from Calabrian etrogim is commercially available. Today in Israel, one of the most cultivated trees used for reforestation is known as the Calabrian pine

The Mishna, in the order of Moed, Eruvin 42-43, makes an undated reference to the ancient Calabrian settlement of Brindisi, also known as Plandarsin. It was in Brindisi/Plandarsin that Rabbis Gamliel, Akiva, and other Tannaim debate oral law concerning personal travel during Shabbat.

The first dated mentioning of Jewish communities in Calabria were by Roman officials in the service of the Western Emperor Honorius in the year 398. Some ancient towns known to have had a Jewish community were Reggio (Rhegion) and Catanzaro (Katantheros). Today some physical remnants of the ancient Calabrian Jewish community still survives. For example, the remains of the 4th century, Bova Marina Synagogue are located in the town of Bova Marina. Another example is an inscription that mentions Calabria in the Jewish catacombs of Monteverde in Rome. These catacombs were in use from the first to the 3rd century.

Another popular legend states that after the Sack of Rome in 410, Gothic general Alaric carried his booty, including the Temple Treasure of Jerusalem, South with him on his way to Africa. When Alaric died suddenly while in Calabria, he was believed to have buried the Temple Treasure somewhere near the Calabria town of Consentia.

In the year 925, an army of Fatimite Muslims, led by Ja'far ibn Ubaid, invaded Calabria which devastated the Jewish population. It was during this time that Shabbethai Donnolo, was made captive. He would later become the Byzantine court physician in Calabria, and wrote many of his most famous works on medicine and theology while in Calabria.

== Middle Ages ==
During the early period of the Middle Ages, Calabria, Basilicata and Apulia forming the Catepanate of Italy were under Byzantine rule, and Calabria was an important commercial center. During this time the Calabrian Jewish population, estimated at around 12,000, flourished. According to some sources, some areas of Calabria may have had a Jewish population of up to fifty percent. Many Jews were prosperous merchants dominating such industries as silk trading and cloth dyeing. Money lending was also an important source of revenue for the Calabrian Jews.

Many Jews of Calabria lived in special segregated neighborhoods known as La Giudecca. Remnants of these neighborhoods still exist in Calabrian towns such as Nicastro. At their height, the Jews of Calabria, along with the other Jews of southern Italy were second only to the Jews from the Iberian Peninsula.

During the First Crusade, southern Italy, including both Sicily and Calabria fell to the Normans. For a time, this resulted in uniting both Jewish populations, as well as other Jewish communities in southern Italy under the flag of the Kingdom of Sicily. Norman conqueror, Robert Guiscard governed Calabria in 1061. Guiscard encouraged the Jews of Catanzaro to engage in several agricultural trades. In fact, unlike many of the Jewish communities of Western Europe, the Jews of Calabria largely escaped the atrocities associated with that period. Benjamin of Tudela mentioned the Jews of Calabria on his return trip to Spain around 1175.

After several centuries of relative peace and prosperity under the rule of the Kingdom of Naples, the persecution of the Calabrian Jews started in 1288 with accusations of blood libel. Under Charles II of Anjou with the assistance of the friars of the Dominican Order, the decline of the Calabrian Jewish communities began. During this time many Calabrian Jews and their wealth began to move to other Jewish communities of France and Northern Italy. Meanwhile, other Calabrian Jews were pressured to convert to Christianity. These Jewish converts to Christianity in Southern Italy were known as Neofiti.

In 1348, during the years of the Black Death, a Jew by the name of Agimet of Geneva, confessed under torture to poisoning the wells of Calabria among other places. This extracted confession was one of the factors contributing to the anti-semitic Strasbourg pogrom.

The first type set Hebrew books in Europe were printed in Reggio by Abraham Garton in 1475. Garton did not use movable type, but used a block page format to print his material. Garton's works were printed in a Hebrew style known as Rashi Script. Some historians ponder the connection between Garton's pioneering mass production revolution of Hebrew books and the raise of Ashkenazi prominence in religious scholarship. In the former Jewish quarter of Reggio there is a street named, "Via Ashkenaz". In addition to the first printed Hebrew book, the first Hebrew commentary on the Hagaddah also appeared in Reggio, in 1482.

A short-lived revival of the Calabrian Jewish communities began after Sephardic Jews fleeing the Spanish expulsion arrived in 1492. Another wave of Jewish refugees also arrived in Calabria fleeing from the Expulsion of the Jews from Sicily in 1493. And Jews from the island of Sardinia also resettled in Calabria after their expulsion as well. In 1510, the first in a series of Jewish expulsions began in Calabria. The final blow to the Calabrian Jews culminated when the Spanish Inquisition at last reached Calabria. By 1541, the Roman Catholic Church ordered the last Jews of Calabria to either leave or to convert to Catholicism. For those who could afford to leave, most went to the Greek cities of Arta, Corfu and Thessaloniki, The Calabrian Jews were a sizable block in the Jewish community of Thessaloniki where they constituted four of the 30 synagogues in the city. A Calabrian Jewish Synagogue, which was located in Constantinople is also known. Four hundred years later, the last direct descendants of the Calabrian Jews living in Greece would perish in the Holocaust.

As for the rest of Calabrian Jews too poor to emigrate during the Inquisition, they were subjected to a forced conversion, and Jewish houses of worship were converted into churches. For example, the synagogue of Catanzaro was converted to a church dedicated to St. Stefano. The Calabrian converts, many who still secretly practiced Crypto-Judaism, were known in Hebrew as Anusim. Despite their conversion to Catholicism, many converted Jews of Calabria were regularly discriminated against and were forced to live as second class citizens.

During the Middle Ages, Calabria contributed much to the culture of the Jewish people in Europe. Many Jewish scholars, such as Rabbi Hayyim ben Joseph Vital and descendants of the Isaac Abarbanel were known to have come from or resided in Calabria. Also, the 15th-century Christian Hebraist, Agathius Guidacerius, a well regarded Greek and Hebrew grammatical expert was born in the Calabrian town of Rocca-Coragio.

== Modern times ==
Benedetto Musolino (1809–1885), was a non-Jew from a Calabrian noble family. In 1851, he wrote "Gerusalemme e il Popolo Ebreo" - "Jerusalem and the Jewish People", a plan for the establishment of a Jewish state in Turkish Palestine, with Hebrew as its national language. Unfortunately, his writing was not published at that time. Had it been published at the time of its writing, it would have preceded Theodore Herzl's Der Judenstaat by forty-five years.

During World War II, Italian Dictator, Benito Mussolini built the internment camp of Ferramonti di Tarsia near the Calabrian town of Cosenza. Many of the prisoners were Jews from all over Europe who had fled to Italy escaping the Holocaust. However, the Tarsia internment camp was not a death camp and the vast majority of Jews there survived the war unharmed.

Margherita Sarfatti, a wealthy Jewish woman who had a love affair with the Italian Dictator, Benito Mussolini then escaped Italy during the German occupation returned to Italy in 1947.

Today, over 50 descendants of Calabrian neofiti have revived a small Jewish community in Calabria. In 2007, Calabria consecrated its first synagogue in 500 years. The Ner Tamid del Sud Synagogue in the town of Serrastretta, a European member congregation of Reconstructionist Judaism, serves the regional Jewish community. This community began with the efforts of progressive Rabbi, Barbara Aiello. Aiello is also active in Italian American community. Her organizational efforts have led some Italian Americans of Calabrian descent to search for their Jewish ancestry. According to Aiello, many Jewish rituals still remain with modern Calabrian families. For example, the lighting of Friday evening candles, avoiding pork and shellfish, or meat mixed with dairy products. Other practices such as hanging a red string over a baby's crib, or tying it to their wrist, which are Kabbalah rituals.

Since 2008, Kosher Passover vacation packages have been hosted in the city of Reggio. However, these packages cater to affluent Jewish travelers not local to Calabria.

== Language and culture ==
As all of the original Jews of the southern Italian area, which was at some time part of the Byzantine Empire, the Jewish community of Calabria was consisted of Romaniote Jews which had close ties to the Greek-speaking communities of the mainland Greece and of Constantinople and later to the Ottoman Empire. However, these Jews spoke mostly Judaeo-Greek. In this case the Jews were well integrated into the wider Greek-speaking (Christian) community of South Italy. But it was probably in some communities common to speak also Judaeo-Italian and so these Jews had often Hebrew or Italian names.

The Calabrian Jews followed the Romaniote nusach. A Southern Italian Mahzor, from the 16th century for the Romaniote Rite with verses in Judaeo-Greek is known.

With the arrival of the Iberian Jews after 1492, Ladino was also spoken throughout Calabria and the Sephardic rite was also practiced in Calabria.

Despite Mosaic prohibitions against astrology, this occult art was popular with the Jews of Southern Italy, including Calabria, during the Byzantine era.

Cuisine originally associated with the Jews of Sicily and Calabria included those dishes labelled "alla giudia" or "all'ebraica," such as pasta with anchovies and garlic, concia di zucchine, fried courgettes marinated in vinegar and caponata, a sweet and sour aubergine dish. Another well known Jewish Italian dish from the south is Pizza Ebraica di Erbe also known as Jewish Pizza. Yet another example is Pane Azzimo (ἄζυμον gr. unleavened). This is a variation of the Sephardic dish known as Pan de Semita or Semitic Bread. Many of these foods have become mainstream Sicilian and Calabrian dishes.

Christopher Marlowe's play, The Jew of Malta mentions Calabria.

== Image gallery ==
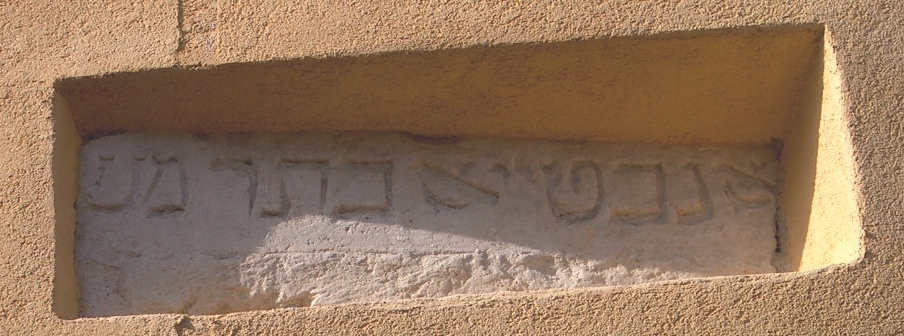
An inscription written with Hebrew characters partially preserved on a wall, in Gerace, Calabria.

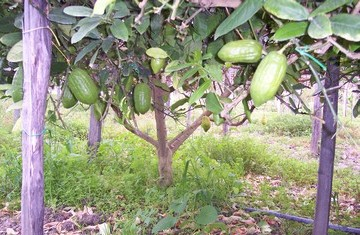
A Diamante Citron Tree in Calabria supported with sticks.

== See also ==
- History of the Jews in Apulia
- History of the Jews in Southern Central Italy
- History of the Jews in Livorno
- History of the Jews in Naples
- History of the Jews in Sardinia
- History of the Jews in Sicily
- History of the Jews in Trieste
- History of the Jews in Turin
- History of the Jews in Venice

=== Other ===
- History of the Jews in Italy
- History of the Jews in the Roman Empire
- History of the Jews of Thessaloniki
- Expulsion of the Jews from Spain
- Expulsion of the Jews from Sicily
- Marranos
- Hebrew incunabula
