= Impade =

Filled cookie from Sephardic cuisine

- Type: Cookie or biscuit
- Place of origin: Jewish Community of Venice, Italy
- Created by: Venetian Jews
- Variations: Filling: traditionally marzipan

Impade is a cookie of Sephardi Jewish origin that is most commonly found among members of the Venetian Jewish community and their descendants, and is traditionally prepared at Purim, but is also prepared year round.

== Etymology ==
The name "impade" may be related to "empanada", the savory pastries popular among Sephardic Jews dating back to their residence in pre-Inquisition Iberia, their name means “wrapped in bread” in Spanish, and they date back to at least the year 1500 CE.

== History ==
"Today, Venice is home to only about 450 Jews, 30 of whom live in the (now very touristy) ghetto, where you can still find a kosher bakery cooking up traditional treats like impade."

— Emily Sacharin, Jewish food historian

Impade was invented by the Jewish community of Venice; which dates back to ancient times but was mostly descended of Sephardic Jewish refugees beginning in the Middle Ages. The almond filling of the impade suggests that it may have evolved from various desserts brought to Venice by Sephardic Jews in the 15th century, who were fleeing from the Spanish Inquisition, as almond was a characteristic ingredient in medieval Iberian baking. Almond paste and marzipan are also found in desserts and sweets through the Jewish diaspora. Jews were subject to various discriminatory laws against them, and were only allowed to enter a limited number of professions; including baking breads, cookies, pastries such as impade. Impade became associated with Purim, as Jewish holiday commemorating the victory of Queen Esther over the evil King Haman.

== Overview ==
Impade consist of a small, hard cookie that is shaped similar to a snake or the Latin letter S, that has been made with a pareve (dairy-free) dough consisting of flour, oil, eggs, sugar and salt, filled with a sweet filling, typically consisting of almond paste or marzipan, and is often topped with powdered sugar.

== See also ==
- Hamantash
- Fazuelos
- Sambusak
