= History of the Jews in the Roman Empire =

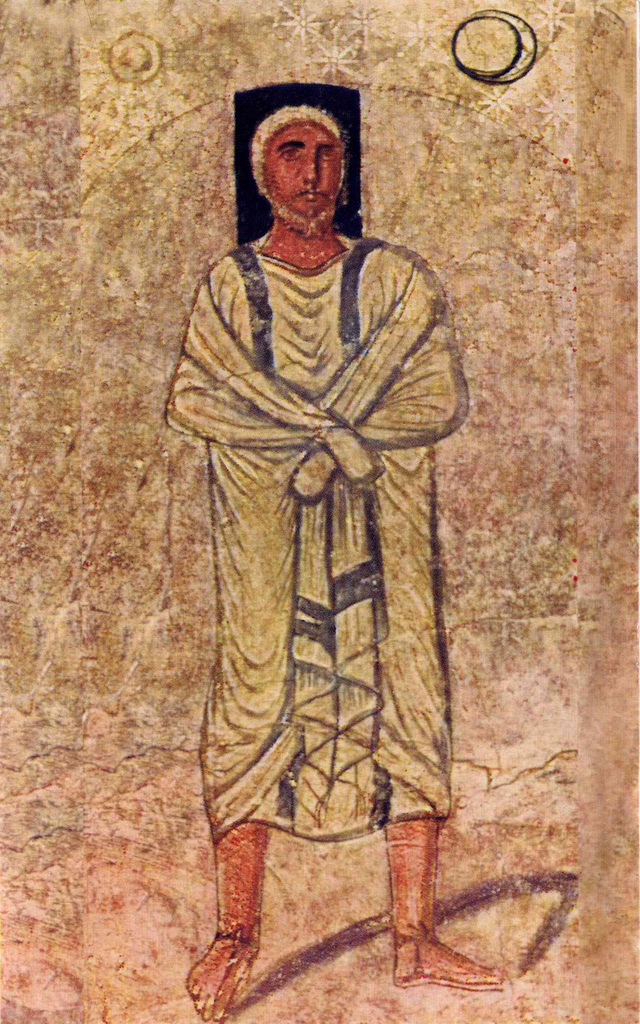
Image of Joshua from the 3rd-century wall paintings at the synagogue of Dura-Europos

The history of the Jews in the Roman Empire traces the interaction of Jews and Romans during the period of the Roman Empire (27 BC – 476 AD). A Jewish diaspora had migrated to Rome and to the territories of Roman Europe from the land of Israel, Anatolia, Babylon and Alexandria in response to economic hardship and incessant warfare over the land of Israel between the Ptolemaic and Seleucid empires from the 4th to the 1st centuries BC. In Rome, Jewish communities thrived economically. Jews likely became a significant part of the Roman Empire's population in the first century AD, though there is no agreement in academia about the exact numbers and most numbers are speculative at best.

Roman general Pompey conquered Jerusalem and its surroundings by 63 BC. The Romans deposed the ruling Hasmonean dynasty of Judaea (in power from c. 140 BC) and the Roman Senate declared Herod the Great "King of the Jews" in c. 40 BC. Judea proper, Samaria and Idumea became the Roman province of Judaea in 6 AD. Jewish–Roman tensions resulted in several Jewish–Roman wars between the years 66 and 135 AD, which resulted in the destruction of Jerusalem and the Second Temple and the institution of the Jewish Tax in 70 AD (those who paid the tax were exempt from the obligation of making sacrifices to the Roman imperial cult).

In 313, Constantine and Licinius issued the Edict of Milan giving official recognition to Christianity as a legal religion. Constantine the Great moved the Roman capital from Rome to Constantinople c. 330, and with the Edict of Thessalonica in 380, Christianity became the state church of the Roman Empire. Christian emperors progressively restricted Jewish legal rights and communal autonomy over several centuries, while also legislating to protect Jews from violence and preserve their religious practice.

== Roman Republic ==
Even before Rome annexed Judea as a province, the Romans had interacted with Jews from their diasporas settled in Rome for a century and a half. Many cities of the Roman provinces in the eastern Mediterranean contained very large Jewish communities, dispersed from the time of the sixth century BC. Though the Romans guaranteed the practice of Jewish religion, they resented the spread of foreign religions among Roman natives and for this reason expelled the Jews from Rome in 139 BC (as had also happened to the cult of Bacchus in 186 BC).

Before the Romans got involved in Judaean politics, they supported the Maccabean Revolt and Judah Maccabee obtained an alliance with the Roman Republic. Rome's deeper involvement in the Eastern Mediterranean dated from 63 BC, following the end of the Third Mithridatic War, when Rome made Syria a province. After the defeat of Mithridates VI of Pontus, the proconsul Pompeius Magnus (Pompey the Great) remained to secure the area, including a visit to the Jerusalem Temple. The former king Hyrcanus II was confirmed as ethnarch of the Jews by Julius Caesar in 44 BC. In 37 BC, the Herodian Kingdom was established as a Roman client kingdom and in 6 AD parts became a province of the Roman Empire, named Iudaea Province. Herod's temple was world-famous and important gentiles offered sacrifices for pious reasons, such as Herod's friend Marcus Agrippa, who offered a hecatomb in 15 BC.

== Roman Empire ==
During the first century AD, Roman rule in Judaea was often clumsy and unsuccessful. Due to chronic insolvency, raids on the Temple were frequent and led to outrage, there were numerous bands of brigands and the mixed Greek-Jewish populations in the towns often led to tensions. There were at least three uprisings: one led by Judas of Gamala in 6 AD, another one in 44 AD led by Theudas, and one in the time of Procurator Felix (52–60 AD). With the slow adoption of emperor worship, relations deteriorated swiftly between the once allies, and Jewish refusal to participate in the formalities of state worship was seen as disloyalty. Roman hostility was enthusiastically supported by Greek intellectuals and especially Alexandria, a large Jewish center, was a center of antisemitic propaganda. These included slanders that the Jews had no claim on Israel, that the Jews worshipped asses and had an ass's head in the temple or that they conducted secret human sacrifices in the temple. Feldman suggests that the many messianic movements in Judaea around the first and second century AD were likely a source of anxiety to the Romans.

The efforts of Caligula to install a statue of himself in the Temple (37–41 AD), which required the intervention of Philo of Alexandria and Herod Agrippa to prevent, has been proposed as the "first open break between Rome and the Jews"; although problems were already evident during the Census of Quirinius in 6 AD and under Sejanus (before 31 AD). The emperor Tiberius had rectified the latter by intervening and ultimately recalling Pontius Pilate to Rome. During the time of Emperor Nero the Jews seem to have had some influence at the court, possibly through the Jewish actor Alityros and even the emperor's wife, who might have been a symphathiser with the Jews.

In the Greek cities in the east of the Roman empire, tensions often arose between the Greek and Jewish populations. One major point of contention were the privileges granted by certain Roman rulers to the Jews. Writing around 90 AD, the Jewish author Josephus cited decrees by Julius Caesar, Mark Antony, Augustus and Claudius, endowing Jewish communities with a number of rights. Central privileges included the right to be exempted from polis religious rituals and the permission "to follow their ancestral laws, customs and religion". Jews were also exempted from military service and the provision of Roman troops. Contrary to what Josephus wants his readers to believe, the Jews did not have the status of religio licita (permitted religion) as this status did not exist in the Roman empire, nor were all Roman decrees concerning the Jews positive. Instead, the regulations were made as a response to individual requests to the emperor. The decrees were deployed by Josephus "as instruments in an ongoing political struggle for status".

Because of their one-sided viewpoint, the authenticity of the decrees has been questioned many times, but they are now thought to be largely authentic. Still, Josephus gave only one side of the story by leaving out negative decisions and pretending that the rulings were universal. This way, he carried out an ideological message showing that the Romans allowed the Jews to carry out their own customs and rituals; the Jews were protected in the past and were still protected by these decisions in his own time. However, Romans seem to have been opposed in general to Jewish missionary activities.

Though Jews seem to have been numerous in the Roman Empire, there is no consensus on the number of Jews in the Roman Empire. Some authors have suggested as high as 7 million people. but this estimation has been questioned. Specifically, the number seems to be based on the misreading of a medieval text of the 13th-century author Bar Hebraeus.

=== Jewish–Roman wars ===
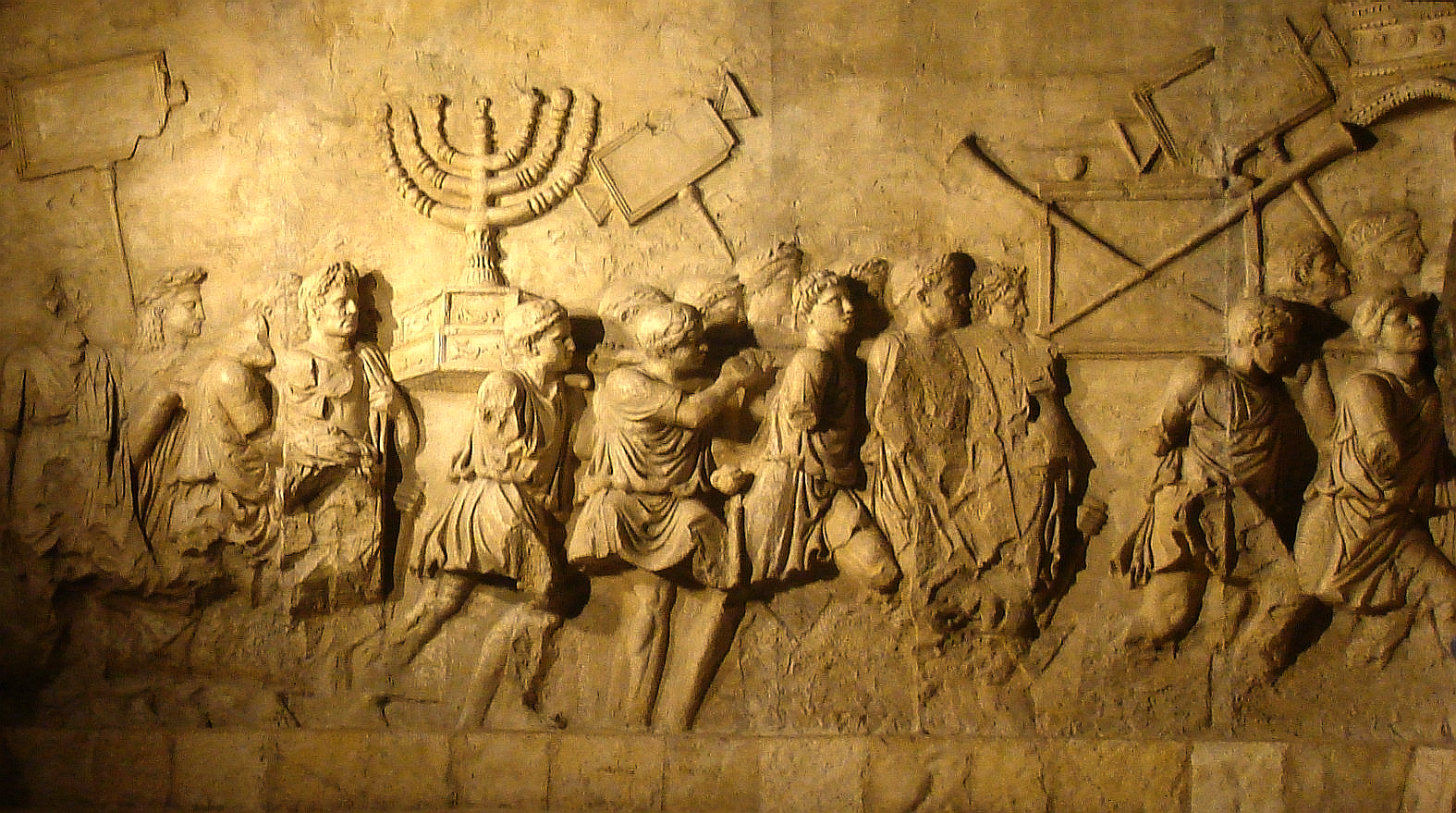
Relief from the Arch of Titus in Rome depicting a menorah and other objects looted from the Temple of Jerusalem carried in a Roman triumph

In 66 AD, the First Jewish–Roman War began after a Graeco-Jewish lawsuit in which the Greek party won. Violence escalated when the Roman governor Gessius Florus plundered the Temple treasury, followed by the suspension of sacrifices at the temple in honour of the people and the emperor of Rome and the massacre of several civilians as well as the Roman garrison. The revolt was both a civil war between the Greek and the Jews as well as between various Jewish factions, specifically the Hellenised Jews and more traditional Jews. The revolt was ultimately crushed by the future Roman emperors Vespasian and Titus. During the siege of Jerusalem in 70 AD, the Romans destroyed the Temple and plundered its artifacts, including the menorah, and its inhabitants killed or enslaved. In the aftermath of the antisemitic sentiment continued to spread and the fall of Jerusalem was taken as evidence that God hated the Jews, such as by the author Philostratus or Tacitus who repeated also previous Greek antisemitic smears. Nevertheless, the Romans did not reverse their policy of toleration of the Jews and did not diminish the privileges granted to Jewish communities across the empire, with the only retribution being the conversion of the Temple tax into a humiliating poll tax called the Fiscus Judaicus for the upkeep of temple of Jupiter Capitolinus.

According to rabbinic sources, Yohanan ben Zakkai, a prominent Pharisaic leader who had opposed the revolt, was smuggled out of Jerusalem in a coffin and was able to obtain permission from the Roman authorities to set up a center for regulation of the Jewish religion at Jamnia. Both Yohanan and the synagogue of Jamnia became normative institutions in Judaism and established many Jewish rules while also completing the canonization of the Tanakh. Yohanan's pupil Joshua ben Hananiah urged the Jews to accept Roman suzerainty and it is likely that many rabbis were reconciled with Roman rule. The Jewish leaders of Alexandria even handed over 600 Sicarii, who had fled after the defeat to Egypt, to the Roman authorities in order to prove their loyalty and restore the relation. Under Emperor Domitian the fiscus iudaicus was collected strictly and converts to Judaism punished, but this seems to have ended under Emperor Nerva and also the Diaspora Revolt in 115–117 did not change Roman policy.

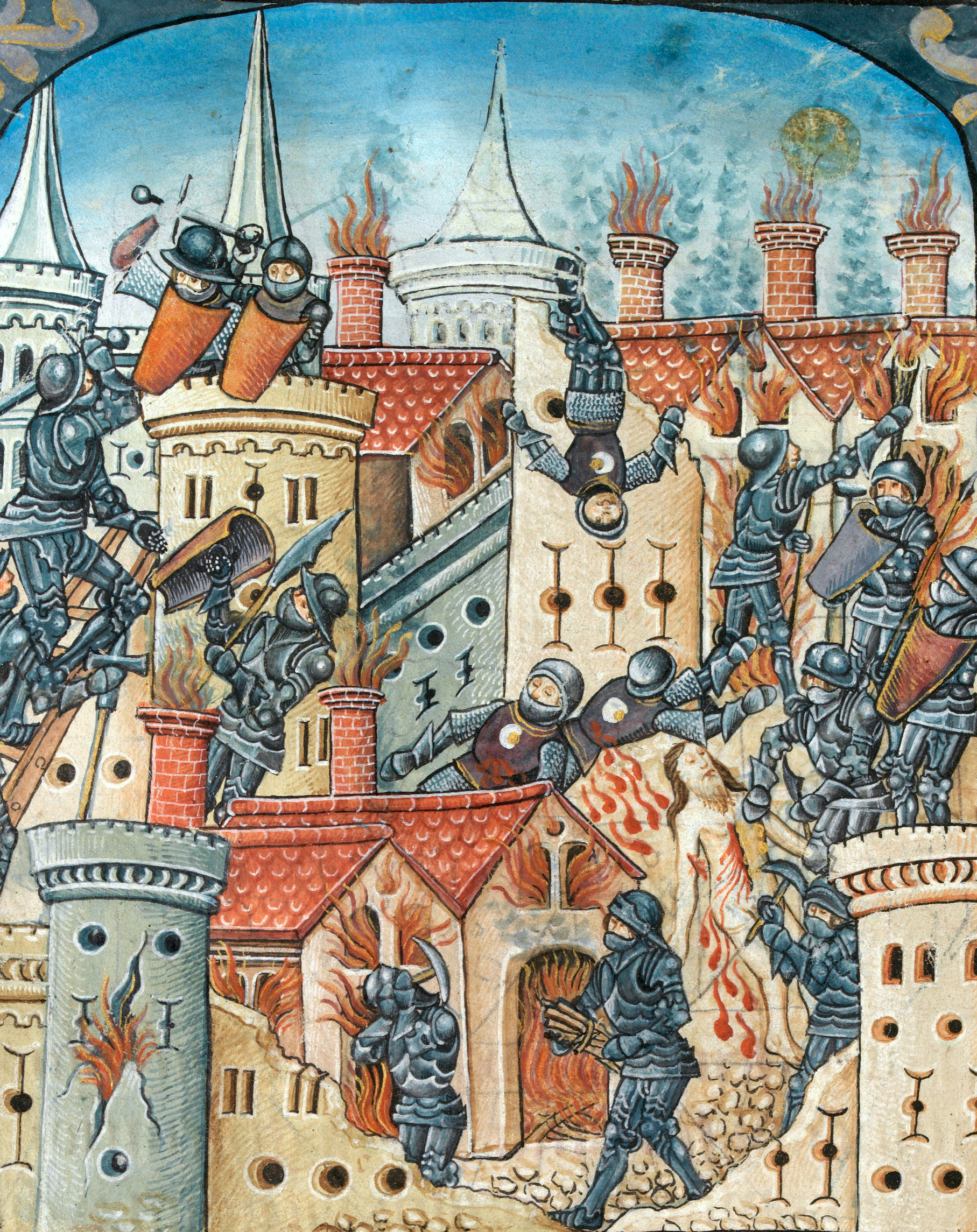
Siege and destruction of Jerusalem by the Romans, painted c. 1504

Jews continued to live in their land in significant numbers, until Sextus Julius Severus devastated the region while crushing the Bar Kokhba revolt of 132–136. Hadrian had been initially friendly to Judaism, but he became increasingly hostile towards Eastern religion and Judaism (possibly due to the influence of Tacitus), with a particular dislike of circumcision. Hadrian's plan to establish a Roman colony on the ruins of Jerusalem, and a possible ban on circumcision, sparked this Jewish rebellion—the last major attempt at regaining independence. Under Simon bar Kokhba, the rebels established a short-lived state, but the Romans soon amassed a large force and brutally crushed the revolt. 985 villages were destroyed and most of the Jewish population of central Judaea was essentially wiped out—either killed, sold into slavery, or forced to flee. Survivors were banished from Jerusalem and its surroundings, and the Jewish population shifted to Galilee.

After the suppression of the Bar Kokhba revolt in 135, Hadrian rebuild Jerusalem under the name Aelia Capitolina, repopulated it with Greek-speakers and forbade Jews to enter it on pain of death. This law might not have been enforced very strictly and the Jews were able to get permission to visit the Wailing Wall on the anniversary of its destruction (Tisha B'Av). Hadrian also renamed the province of Judaea to Syria Palaestina, maybe in an attempt to erase the historical ties of the Jewish people to the region. Other explanations have also been proposed, and Ronald Syme suggested that the renaming efforts preceded and helped precipitate the rebellion. The unsuccessful revolt was followed by several draconian measures against many Jewish observances, but these were alleviated by Hadrian's successor Antoninus Pius. The official policy seems to have been to tolerate and protect Judaism so long as it posed no threat, through attempts at proselytising, to the state cult or social order.

== Late Roman period ==
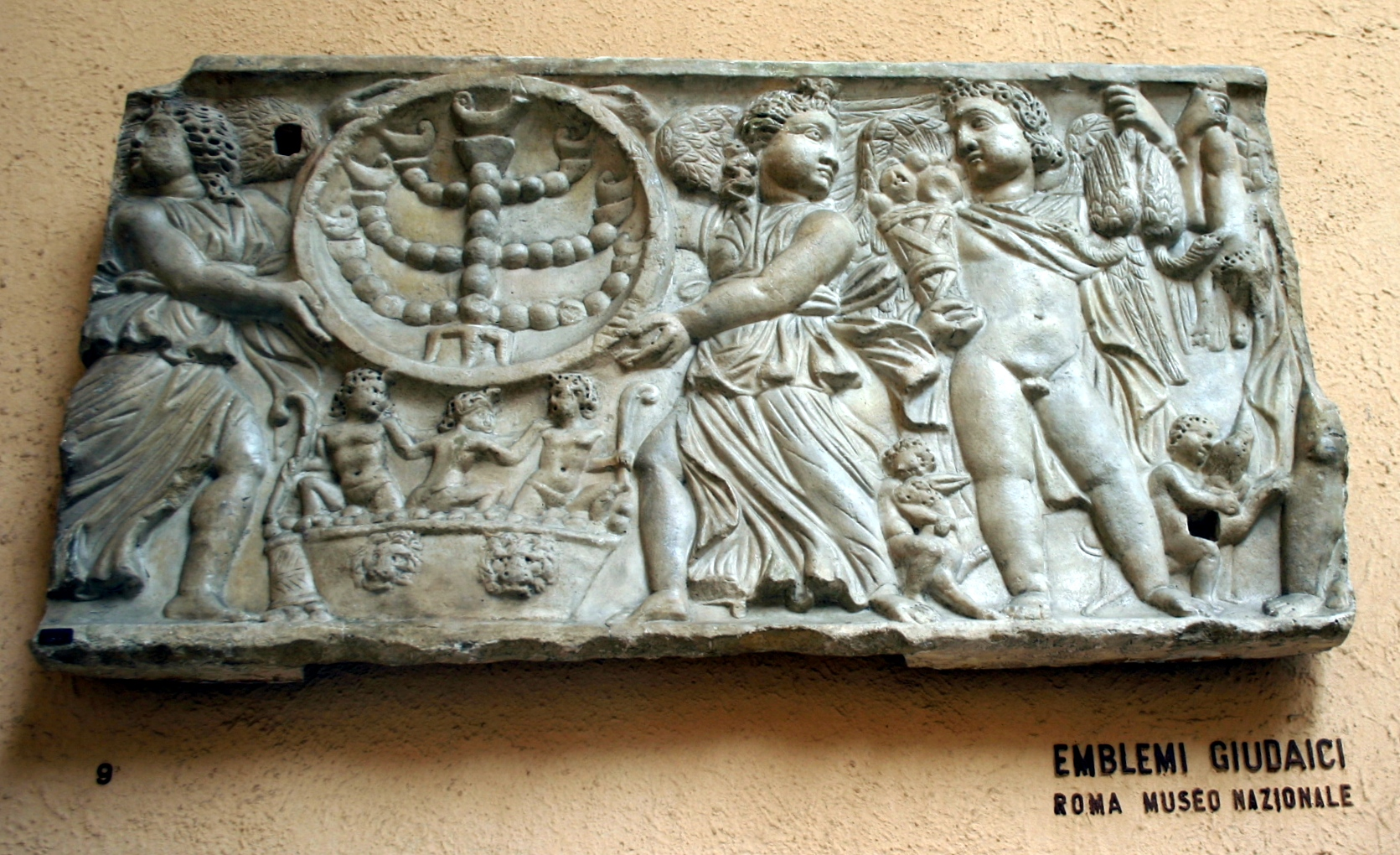
A pair of putti bearing a menorah, on a cast of a 2nd- or 3rd-century relief (original in the National Museum of Rome)

In spite of the failure of the Bar Kokhba revolt, Jews remained in the land of Israel in significant numbers. The Jews who remained there went through numerous experiences and armed conflicts against consecutive occupiers of the Land. Some of the most famous and important Jewish texts were composed in Israeli cities at this time. The completion of the Mishnah is a prominent example.

In this period the tannaim and amoraim were active rabbis who organized and debated the Jewish oral law. A major catalyst in Judaism is Judah haNasi, who was a wealthy rabbi and one of the last tannaim, oral interpreters of the Law. He was in good standing with Roman authority figures, which aided in his ascent to being the Patriarch of the Jewish community in Palestine. The decisions of the tannaim are contained in the Mishnah, Beraita, Tosefta, and various Midrash compilations. The Mishnah was completed shortly after 200 CE, probably by Judah haNasi. The commentaries of the amoraim upon the Mishnah are compiled in the Jerusalem Talmud, which was completed around 400 AD, probably in Tiberias.

In 351, the Jewish population in Sepphoris, under the leadership of Patricius, started a revolt against the rule of Constantius Gallus, brother-in-law of Emperor Constantius II. The revolt was eventually subdued by Gallus' general, Ursicinus.

According to tradition, in 359 Hillel II created the Hebrew calendar, which is a lunisolar calendar based on mathematics rather than observation. Until then, the entire Jewish community outside the land of Israel depended on the observational calendar sanctioned by the Sanhedrin; this was necessary for the proper observance of the Jewish holy days. However, danger threatened the participants in that sanction and the messengers who communicated their decisions to distant communities. As the religious persecutions continued, Hillel determined to provide an authorized calendar for all time to come that was not dependent on observation at Jerusalem.

Julian, the only emperor to reject Christianity after the conversion of Constantine, allowed the Jews to return to "holy Jerusalem which you have for many years longed to see rebuilt" and to rebuild the Temple. However Julian was killed in battle on 26 June 363 in his failed campaign against the Sassanid Empire.

In the 380s, emperor Theodosius I instituted religious uniformity as the official policy of the empire so that many new regultations and statutes were imposed on non-Christians. From the fifth century onwards, Roman legislation increasingly prohibited Jews to engage in various occupations, including the legal profession, the military and the upper ranks of Roman administration and evidence for Jewish men holding high status decreases after this century.

During the Byzantine–Sasanian War of 602–628 many Jews sided against the Eastern Roman Empire in the Jewish revolt against Heraclius, which successfully assisted the invading Persian Sassanids in conquering all of Roman Egypt and Syria. In reaction to this further anti-Jewish measures were enacted throughout the Eastern Roman realm and as far away as Merovingian France. Soon thereafter, 634, the Muslim conquests began, during which many Jews initially rose up again against their Eastern Roman rulers.

== Dispersion of the Jews in the Roman Empire ==
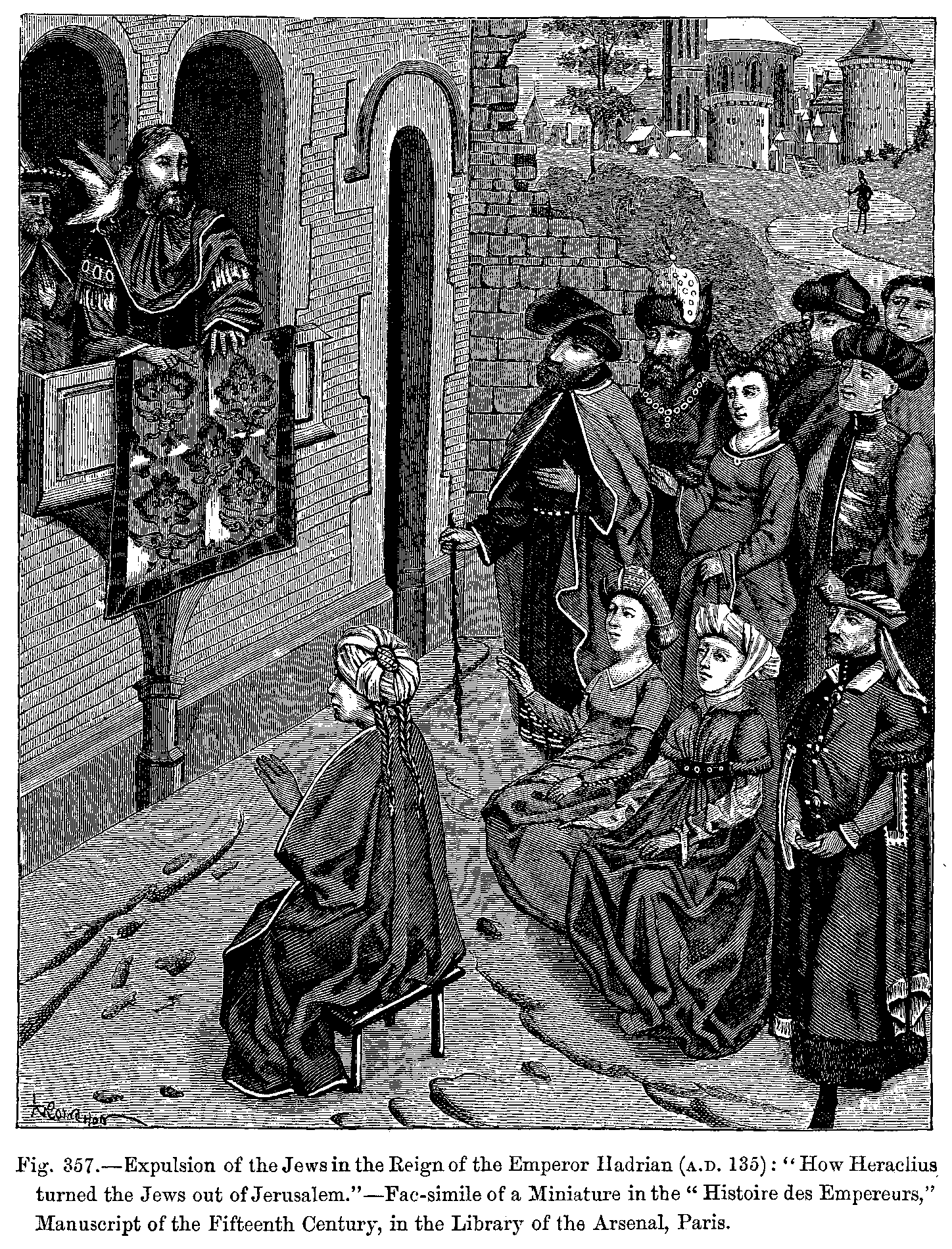
Expulsion of the Jews in the Reign of the Emperor Hadrian (135 AD): How Heraclius turned the Jews out of Jerusalem. (Facsimile of a miniature in the Histoire des Empereurs, 15th-century manuscript, in the Library of the Arsenal, Paris.)

Following the 1st-century Great Revolt and the 2nd-century Bar Kokhba revolt, the destruction of Judea exerted a decisive influence upon the dispersion of the Jewish people throughout the world, as the center of worship shifted from the Second Temple to Rabbinic authority.

Some Jews were sold as slaves or transported as captives after the fall of Judea, others joined the existing diaspora, while still others remained in the region and began work on the Jerusalem Talmud. The Jews in the diaspora were generally accepted into the Roman Empire, but with the rise of Christianity, restrictions grew. Forced expulsions and persecution resulted in substantial shifts in the international centers of Jewish life to which far-flung communities often looked, although not always unified, due to the Jewish people's dispersion itself. Jewish communities were thereby largely expelled from Syria Palaestina and sent to various Roman provinces in the Middle East, Europe and North Africa. The Roman Jewry came to develop a character associated with the urban middle class in the modern age.

== The diaspora ==
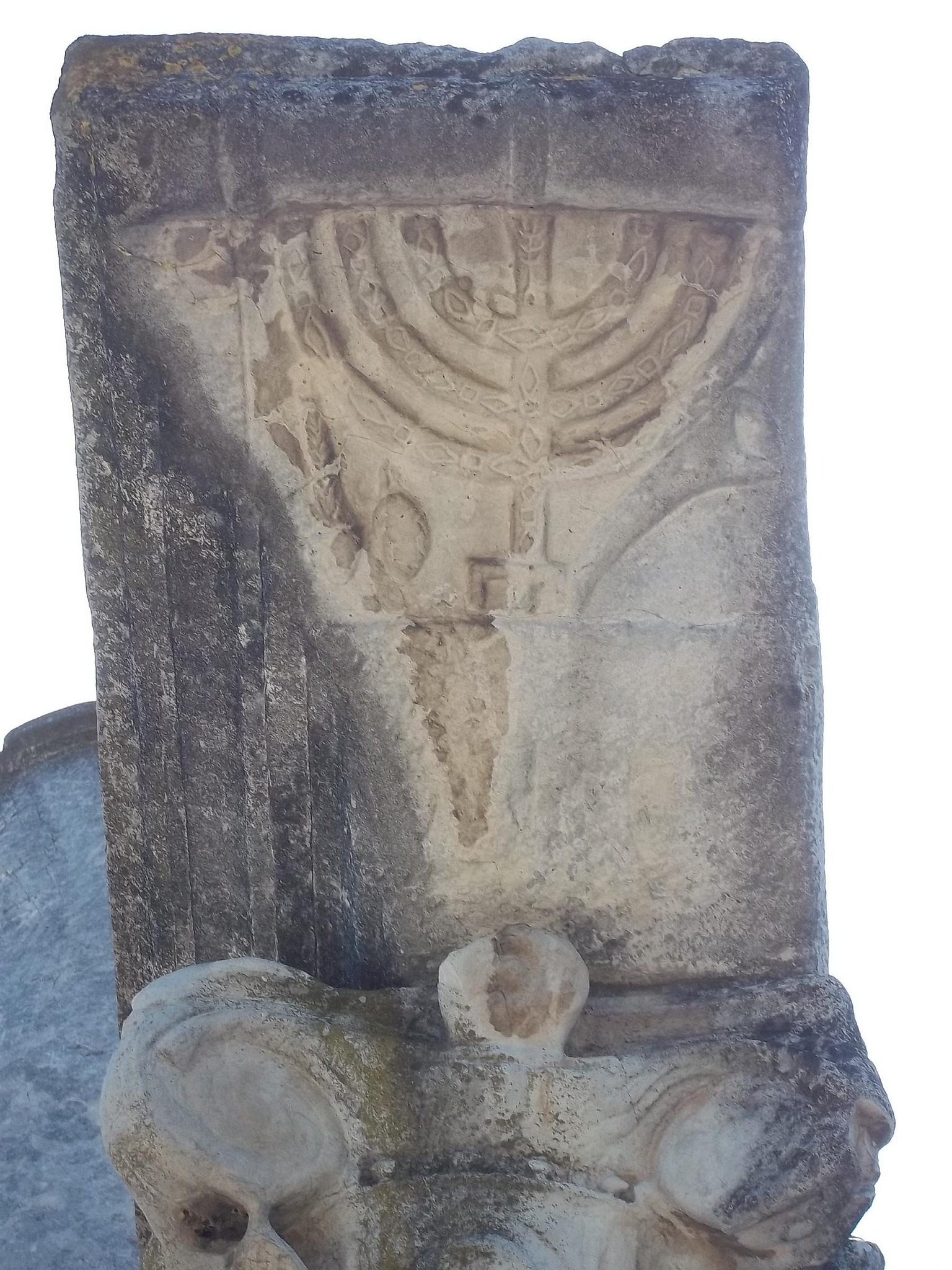
Detail of a menorah relief on a column, Ostia Synagogue, 1st century

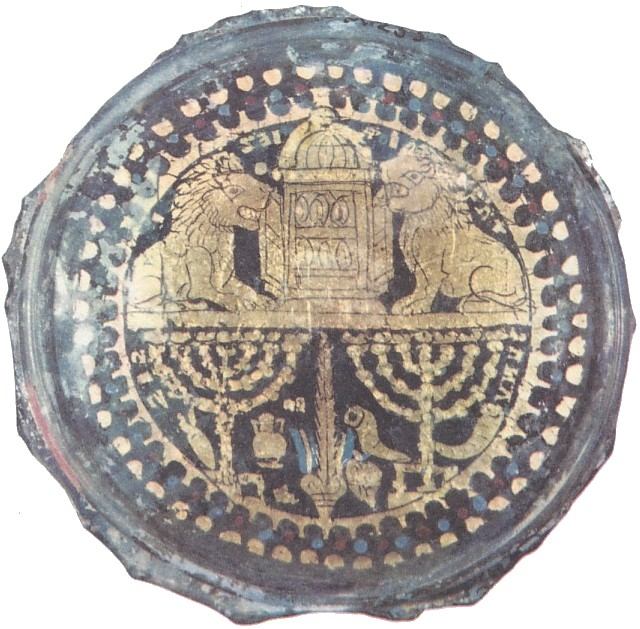
Jewish ritual objects depicted in 2nd century gold glass from Rome

A Jewish diaspora existed for several centuries before the fall of the Second Temple, and their dwelling in other countries for the most part was not a result of compulsory dislocation. Before the middle of the first century AD, in addition to Judea, Syria and Babylonia, large Jewish communities existed in the Roman provinces of Egypt, Crete and Cyrenaica, and in Rome itself; after the Siege of Jerusalem in 63 BC, when the Hasmonean kingdom became a protectorate of Rome, emigration intensified. Many Jews became citizens of other parts of the Roman Empire. Josephus, the book of Acts in the New Testament, as well as other Pauline texts, make frequent reference to the large populations of Hellenised Jews in the cities of the Roman world. It is commonly claimed that the diaspora began with Rome's twofold crushing of Jewish national aspirations. David Aberbach, for one, has argued that much of the European Jewish diaspora, by which he means exile or voluntary migration, originated with the Jewish wars which occurred between 66 and 135 AD. Martin Goodman states that it is only after the destruction of Jerusalem that Jews are found in northern Europe and along the western Mediterranean coast. This widespread popular belief holds that there was a sudden expulsion of Jews from Judea/Syria Palaestina and that this was crucial for the establishment of the diaspora. Israel Bartal contends that Shlomo Sand is incorrect in ascribing this view to most Jewish study scholars, instead arguing that this view is negligible among serious Jewish study scholars. These scholars argue that the growth of diaspora Jewish communities was a gradual process that occurred over the centuries, starting with the Assyrian destruction of Israel, the Babylonian destruction of Judah, the Roman destruction of Judea, and the subsequent rule of Christians and Muslims. After the revolt, the Jewish religious and cultural center shifted to the Babylonian Jewish community and its scholars. For the generations that followed, the destruction of the Second Temple event came to represent a fundamental insight about the Jews who had become a dispossessed and persecuted people for much of their history. Following the Bar Kokhba revolt Jews were reduced to a mainly diaspora people.

Erich S. Gruen maintains that focusing on the destruction of the Temple misses the point that already before this, the diaspora was well established. Compulsory dislocation of people cannot explain more than a fraction of the eventual diaspora. Avrum Ehrlich also states that already well before the destruction of the Temple in 70 AD, more Jews lived in the Diaspora than in Israel. Jonathan Adelman estimated that around 60% of Jews lived in the diaspora during the Second Temple period. Of critical importance to the reshaping of Jewish tradition from the Temple-based religion to the traditions of the Diaspora was the development of the interpretations of the Torah found in the Mishnah and Talmud.

=== Jews in Rome ===
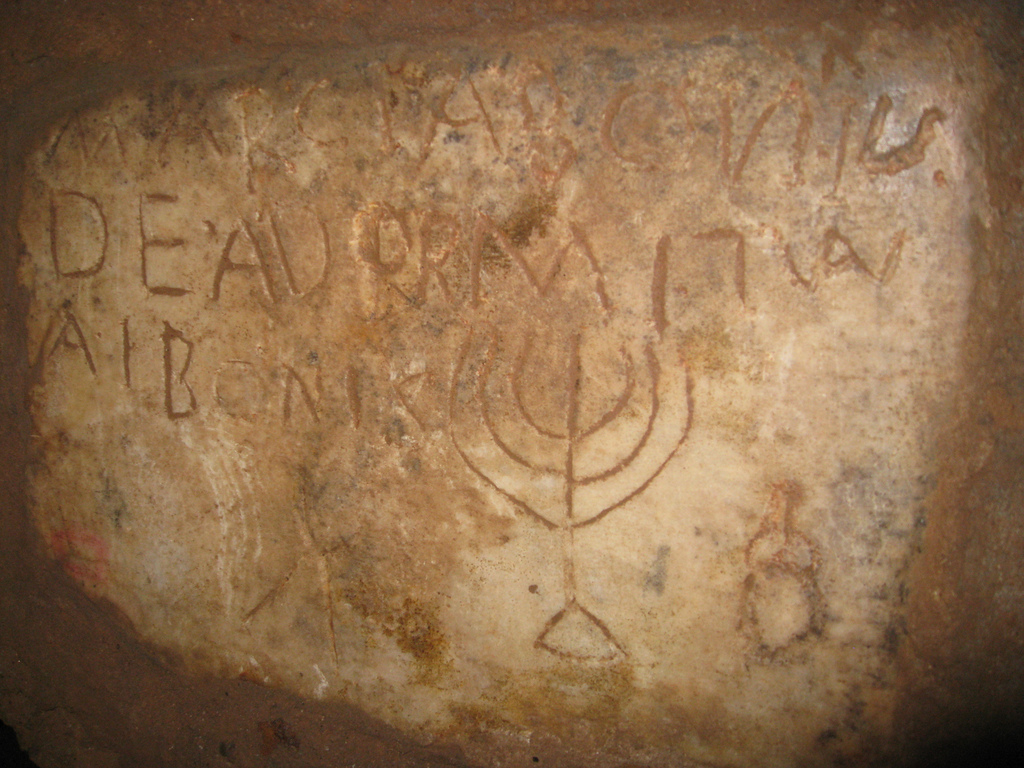
Menorah motif, Vigna Randanini catacombs

According to the article on Rome in The Jewish Encyclopedia, Jews have lived in Rome for over 2,000 years, longer than in any other European city. They might have come there originally from Alexandria, drawn by the lively commercial intercourse between those two cities. In 139 BC and again in 19 AD, the small community of Roman Jews were expelled from the city, likely as they attempted proselytising Romans. Nevertheless, the banishments were brief and Cicero noted in his Pro Flacco around 59 BC how numerous Jews were in Rome and how influential in the assemblies.

The Jewish Encyclopedia connects the two civil wars raging during the last decades of the first century BC, one in Judea between the two Hasmonean brothers Hyrcanus II and Aristobulus II, and one in the Roman republic between Julius Caesar and Pompey, and describes the evolution of the Jewish population in Rome:

... the Jewish community in Rome grew very rapidly. The Jews who were taken to Rome as prisoners were either ransomed by their coreligionists or set free by their Roman masters, who found their peculiar custom obnoxious. They settled as traders on the right bank of the Tiber, and thus originated the Jewish quarter in Rome.

== See also ==
- Constantine the Great and Judaism
- Jewish diaspora
- Jewish ethnic divisions
- Jewish history
- History of the Jews in the Byzantine Empire
- History of the Jews in Egypt
- History of the Jews in Italy
  - History of the Jews in Calabria
  - History of the Jews in Livorno
  - History of the Jews in Naples
  - History of the Jews in Rome
  - History of the Jews in Sicily
  - History of the Jews in Trieste
  - History of the Jews in Turin
  - History of the Jews in Venice
- History of the Jews and Judaism in the Land of Israel
- History of the Jews in Syria
- Italian Jews
- Roman Palestine
