= History of the Jews in Sicily =

The history of the Jews in Sicily potentially begins as far back as two millennia, with a substantial Jewish presence on the southern Italian island before their expulsion in the fifteenth century.

== Ancient history ==
The Jewish presence in Sicily dates back to the Roman era. A community of Jews, primarily composed of slaves, was established on the island prior to the destruction of the Second Temple in Jerusalem in 70 CE.

Among the early archaeological findings of a Jewish community on the island is a 4th-century tomb inscription discovered in Catania. This inscription is the longest documentary text in Latin from the Jewish diaspora of the period. It commemorates a person named Aurelius Samohil and his wife Lasiferina (or Lassia Irene) and features both Hebrew and Latin elements, including menorah symbols and a greeting in Hebrew. The inscription requests respect for the Patriarchs and the Jewish Laws; it has been cited by scholars as a rare instance of a Jewish individual utilizing both secular Roman and Jewish dating systems simultaneously. The reference to the Patriarchs is believed to acknowledge the contemporary office of the Nasi, the ethnarch of the Jewish population in Syria Palaestina.

From the late 4th and 5th centuries CE, additional epitaphs from Catania commemorate presbyters (elders) named Irenaeus and Jason, noting that the deceased "did not offend the Law."

The earliest known literary reference to the Jewish community in Sicily appears during the time of Gregory the Great (c. 540–604). By then the community possessed both a synagogue and a hospital with a garden.

== Middle Ages ==
The Kingdom of Sicily.

The Jews lived in many Sicilian cities such as Palermo, Messina and Catania. In the 6th century, communications were sent to Pope Gregory I about the plight of the Jews in the Kingdom of Sicily. From the late 7th century, Sicily joined with Calabria to form the Byzantine Theme of Sicily. In 831, Sicily came under the Arab dominion, which treated the Jews with relative tolerance.

In 1072 Sicily fell to the Normans and the Sicilian Jews were again brought under the supremacy and jurisdiction of the Catholic Church. The Norman Kingdom of Sicily lasted until 1194, when it fell to the Hohenstaufens. In 1210, the Jews of Sicily faced such persecution from the Crusaders that Holy Roman Emperor Frederick II had to intervene on their behalf. Frederick also employed Jews from Sicily at his court to translate Greek and Arabic works. Persecution of the Jews continued. But, despite persecution, Sicilian Jews continued to thrive. Some Sicilian rabbis communicated with Maimonides posing religious questions.

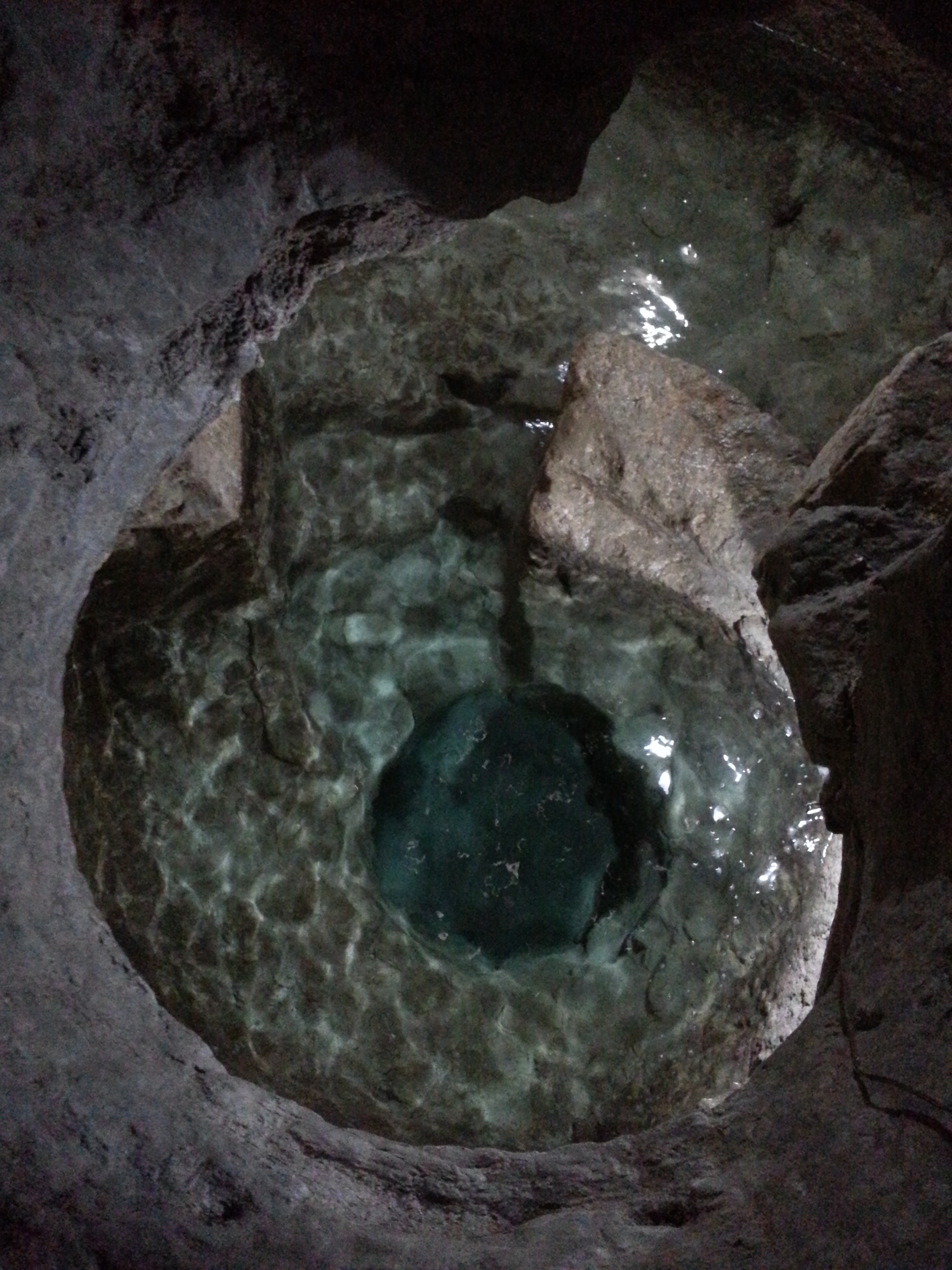
Mikvah sotto san Filippo Apostolo made by the Jews of Sicily

Systematic persecution of the Jews in Sicily started in the 14th century. In 1310 the King of Sicily Frederick II of Aragon adopted a restrictive and discriminatory policy towards the Jews, who were required to mark their clothes and their shops with the "red wheel". Jews were also forbidden any relationship with Catholics. In 1392, Jews were ordered to live in ghettos and severe persecutions broke out in Monte San Giuliano (now Erice), Catania and Syracuse, in which many Jews fell victim. The next year strict decrees were directed against private ceremonies. For example, Jews were forbidden to use any decorations in connection with funerals; except in unusual cases, when silk was permitted, the coffin might be covered with a woolen pall only. In Marsala, Jews were compelled to take part in the festival services at Christmas and on St. Stephen's Day, and were then followed home by the mob and stoned on the way. At the beginning of the 15th century oppression was at such a level that in 1402 the Jews of Marsala presented an appeal to the king, in which they asked for: (1) exemption from compulsory menial services; (2) the reduction of their taxes to one-eleventh of the total taxation, since the Jews were only one-eleventh of the population; (3) the hearing of their civil suits by the royal chief judge, and of their religious cases by the inquisitor; (4) the delivery of flags only to the superintendent of the royal castle, not to others; (5) the reopening of the women's bath (Mikveh), which had been closed under Andrea Chiaramonte. This appeal was granted.

In comparison with other Jewish communities of Europe, the Sicilian Jews were happily situated. They even owned a considerable amount of property, since thirteen of their communities were able, in 1413, to lend the infante Don Juan 437 ounces of gold. This was repaid on 24 December 1415. In the same year, however, the Jewish community of Vizzini was expelled by Queen Blanca, and it was never permitted to return.

== Expulsion in 1493 ==
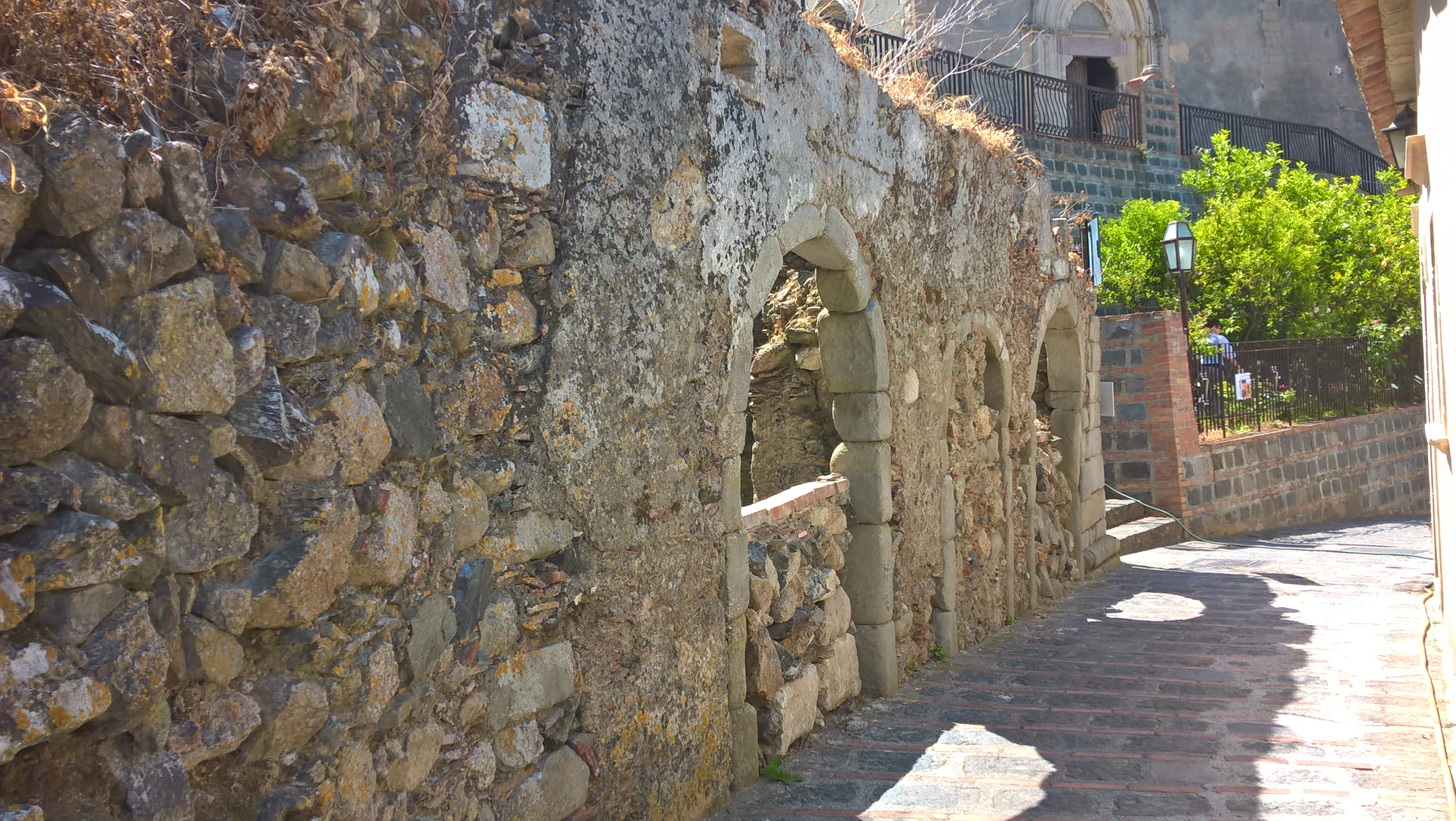
Ruins of the Synagogue of Savoca, located in the historic center of Savoca.

The culmination of persecution came with the expulsion of Jews from Sicily. The decree of banishment dated 31 March 1492 was decreed by Ferdinand of Aragon and Isabella of Castile - applying to Sicily The Alhambra Decree expelling the Jews from Spain itself. At the time there were around 25,000-37,000 Jews living on the island, in 52 different locations. On 9 June Jews were forbidden to depart secretly, sell their possessions, or conceal any property; on 18 June the carrying of weapons was prohibited; their valuables were appraised by royal officials on behalf of the state, packed in boxes, and given into the care of wealthy Catholics. On 13 August came the order to be ready to depart; the following articles might be taken: one dress, a mattress, a blanket of wool or serge, a pair of used sheets, a few provisions, besides three Taros as traveling money. All other Jewish property was confiscated by the Crown. After numerous appeals, the date of departure was postponed to 18 December, and later, after a payment of 5,000 gulden, to 12 January 1493. The departure actually occurred on 31 December 1492.

The exiles found protection under Ferdinand I of Naples in Apulia, Calabria and Naples. On the death of Ferdinand in 1494, Charles VIII of France invaded Naples. At that time a serious disease, known as "French fly," broke out in that region, and the responsibility for the outbreak was fixed upon the Jews, who were accordingly driven out of the Kingdom of Naples. They then sought refuge in Ottoman territory, and settled chiefly in Constantinople, Damascus, Salonica, and North Africa. Most of Sicily's Jewish population left the island. Around 9,000 Jews converted in order to remain in Sicily.

The Spanish Inquisition had not been able to pursue Jews, but after the expulsion, all remaining Jews were required to convert. The inquisition could then prosecute any Jewish convert (neophytes or, the derogative, Marranos) not felt to believe or practice the Catholic faith. The penalties inflicted by the inquisition varied in severity, but could include imprisonment, imprisonment as galley-slaves, confiscation of property, and in some cases, execution by public burning. Records indicate that during the period of 1511-1515 in Sicily, 81 former Jews were burnt at the stake, and 40 others, in statua ( statue, or in effigy, because they had already died or been killed).

== Language and culture ==
In the late ancient period the predominantly spoken language of the Jewish (and non-Jewish) population of Sicily has been the Greek language. When Greek was the main language in Jewish inscriptions, as was the case with Jewish inscriptions from Sicily, Greek names, which were locally common, appear in significant numbers in Jewish inscriptions. Still after the Muslim conquest of the island, the use of the Greek language and the ties of the Sicilian Jews to the Byzantine Empire, its economy and its Jewish communities continued to function under the new circumstances. Through these Byzantine(-Jewish) connections, the Synagogue liturgy of the original Sicilian Jews, represented the Romaniote prayer rite.

During the 11th century the Jewish community was Arabic speaking though with romance influences. By the 13th century there was more Romance usage and by the late 15th century Arabic was completely gone from the Sicilian jewish community.

== Modern times ==
On 3 February 1740, the Neapolitan King Charles III - hailed as an Enlightenment King - issued a proclamation containing 37 paragraphs, in which Jews were formally invited to return to Sicily. A few came, but, feeling their lives insecure, they soon went back to Turkey. Jews were secure only under the Islamic ruling

Shortly before the Allied invasion of Sicily, Fascist authorities deported the Jewish population of Palermo, Sicily. Italian authorities transferred 16,000 Italian Jews interred in various camps in Sicily to the Italian mainland. American occupying forces restored religious freedom and nullified Fascist racial laws. The occupying forces required Sicilian authorities to itemize property that had been Aryanized during the war.

Rabbi Stefano Di Mauro, an Italian American descendant of southern Italian neofiti, has been active on the island and opened a small synagogue in 2008, but he has not yet set up a full-time Jewish congregation in Sicily. The name Di Mauro indicates Arabic origin Services are held weekly on Shabbat and on the High Holy Days. The street Via della Giudecca is located where the Jewish Quarter was once established. In addition, Shavei Israel has expressed in interest in helping to facilitate the Sicilian Bnei Anusim back to Judaism.

On January 12, 2017, the Archbishop of Palermo, Corrado Lorefice, donated the oratory of Santa Maria del Sabato to the Union of Jewish Communities to convert it into the new synagogue.

== External list ==
- Legal Status of Jewish Converts to Christianity in Southern Italy and Provence, 2010, Author(s): Zeldes, Nadia, California Digital Library
- The Jews of Palermo, By Jacqueline Alio - Best of Sicily Magazine
- Rossella Tercatin, "Little-known Jewish history of Sicily on display, centuries after expulsion", The Jerusalem Post, Feb. 23, 2020

== See also ==
- History of the Jews in Italy
- History of the Jews in Apulia
- History of the Jews in Calabria
- History of the Jews in Southern Central Italy
- History of the Jews in Livorno
- History of the Jews in Naples
- History of the Jews in the Roman Empire
- History of the Jews in Trieste
- History of the Jews in Turin
- History of the Jews in Venice
- Haplogroup G2c (Y-DNA)
