= Constantine the Great and Judaism =

Emperor Constantine's views and laws regarding Judaism

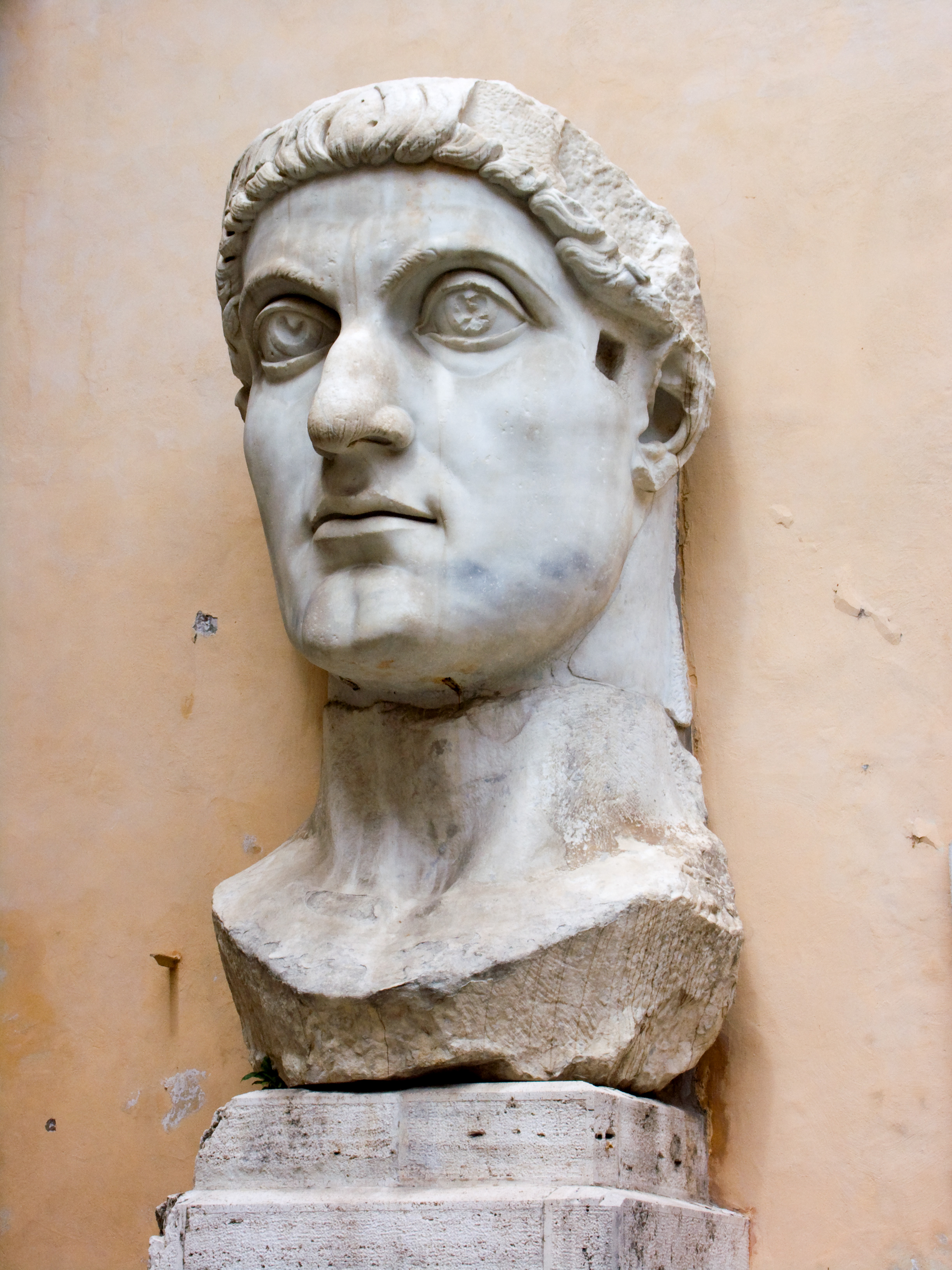
Colossal head of Constantine (4th century), Capitoline museum, Rome

When Constantine the Great came to power in 306, he worked to stop the persecution of Christians in the Roman Empire. However, this led to a large split in the treatment of Christians and Jews.

== Anti-Judaic legislation ==
Under Constantine the Great, Jewish clergy were given the same exemptions as Christian clergy. Jews living in the Roman Empire were legally obliged to pay the Fiscus Judaicus tax since the destruction of the Jewish Temple in 70 CE. This tax continued during his reign and some historians credit the emperor Julian with abolishing this in 362.

It was noted that Judaism was “an abominable sect”.

He also began to claim land in Syria Palaestina for use by the Christian Church. During a visit by his mother in 326 to 327, she identified places where key events may have taken place in Jesus’ life; Constantine went on build churches at those locations.

== The dating of Easter ==
Constantine supported the separation of the date of Easter from the Jewish Passover (see also Quartodecimanism), stating in his letter after the First Council of Nicaea (which had already decided the matter):

"... it appeared an unworthy thing that in the celebration of this most holy feast we should follow the practice of the Jews, who have impiously defiled their hands with enormous sin, and are, therefore, deservedly afflicted with blindness of soul ... Let us then have nothing in common with the detestable Jewish crowd; for we have received from our Saviour a different way."

According to Mark DelCogliano, “it was not the quartodeciman practice that Constantine sought to eliminate, but rather the so-called 'Protopaschite' practice which calculated the paschal full moon according to the Jewish lunar calendar and not the Julian solar calendar".

Theodoret's Ecclesiastical History records The Epistle of the Emperor Constantine, concerning the matters transacted at the Council, addressed to those Bishops who were not present:

"It was, in the first place, declared improper to follow the custom of the Jews in the celebration of this holy festival, because, their hands having been stained with crime, the minds of these wretched men are necessarily blinded. ... Let us, then, have nothing in common with the Jews, who are our adversaries. ... Let us ... studiously avoiding all contact with that evil way. ... For how can they entertain right views on any point who, after having compassed the death of the Lord, being out of their minds, are guided not by sound reason, but by an unrestrained passion, wherever their innate madness carries them. ... lest your pure minds should appear to share in the customs of a people so utterly depraved. ... Therefore, this irregularity must be corrected, in order that we may no more have any thing in common with those parricides and the murderers of our Lord. ... no single point in common with the perjury of the Jews."

== See also ==
- History of the Jews in the Roman Empire
