= History of the Jews in Venice =

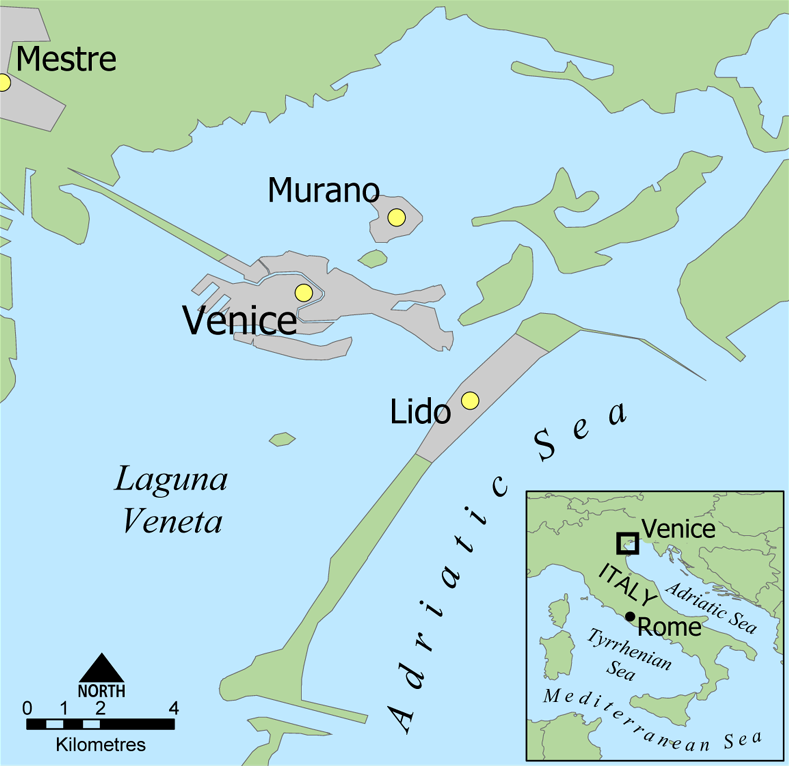
Location of Venice in Italy and the Venetian Lagoon

The history of the Jewish community of Venice, the capital of the Veneto region of Italy, has been well known since the later medieval era.

== Medieval history ==
Although it has been previously assumed that Jews resided in Venice since as early as the twelfth century, these claims have been demonstrated to be invalid and the first Jew documented to have been in Venice was an inhabitant of Venetian Crete who came to the doge as representative of the Jewish community there. Reinhold Mueller demonstrated that only from the late fourteenth century onwards Jews were allowed to reside in Venice when, after the Fourth Genoese War, Venice was in need of loans and new tax income sources. Therefore, the Venetian Republic issued in February 1382 an invitation and legislation to people able to provide funds to come to Venice. Although this was not a direct invitation or legislation catered towards Jews, Mueller shows that nearly all that accepted this invitations were Jews, who subsequently were allowed to stay on a temporary basis. As the Jews proved a less profitable tax resource than expected, the Venetian government decreed that the Jews should depart after 1397 and could only stay for up to fifteen days in the city and should, according to the policy of the Fourth Council of the Lateran that Jews and Muslims should be distinguishable from Christians, wear a yellow circle on their outer clothing.

These rules were not applied consequently and Jews were able to evade them, so that the Venetian government adopted in the fifteenth century a policy of toleration while it did not permit open practice of Judaism. The situation improved slightly in 1464 when Jews petitioned the Ducal college based on the policy of Pope Pius II, who had allowed Jews to practice their religion and threatened anyone with excommunication who hindered them in doing so. Thereafter, while still not allowed to establish synagogues, they were allowed to gather in small groups and recite certain prayers according to their laws. These restrictions were not applied to the Jewish communities in either the Stato da Màr or the Venetian territory on the Italian mainland.

== Renaissance ==
=== Creation of the Venetian Ghetto ===
In 1509, among the many refuges from the former Venetian possessions on the Italian mainland entering Venice during the start of the War of the League of Cambrai, were also Jewish moneylenders. These spread throughout the city, but mostly on the Frari side of the Grand Canal. The Jews were allowed to stay, not only because of their tax contributions, which represented a small but not insignificant part of the Venetian budget, but also due to their capacity to provide loans to the poor of the city. Nevertheless, their numbers and wealth caused consternation and rumours about bribery and blasphemy among the public, such as reflected in the diaries of Girolamo Priuli. This conundrum, in which ideas to expel the Jews conflicted with their economic importance, resulted in the idea to separate them from the rest of the population while keeping them as an economic resource. A first attempt to segregate the Jews was suggested in 23 April 1515 by Giorgio Emo, a powerful politician, but two leaders of the Jewish community successfully protested against it.

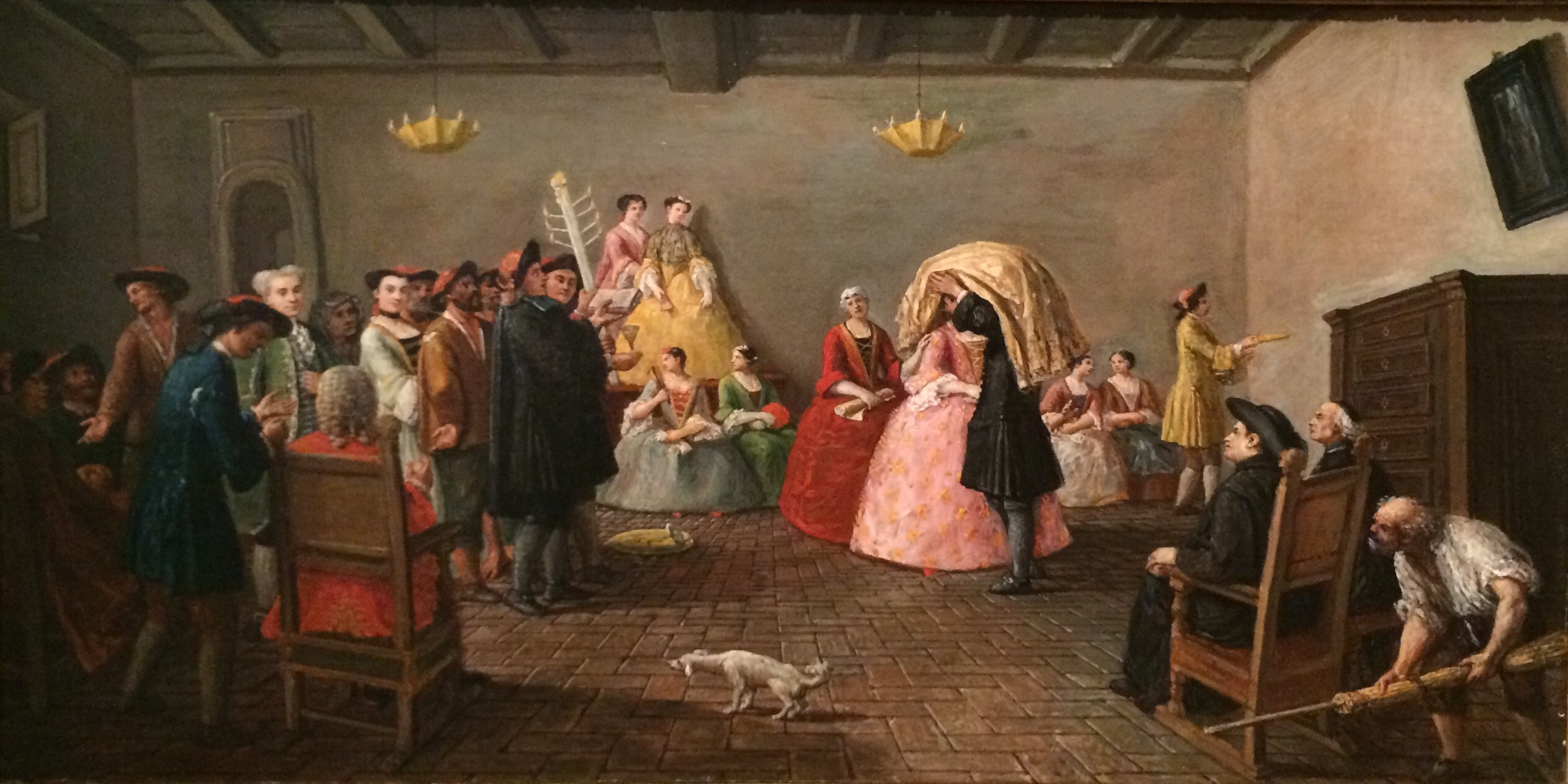
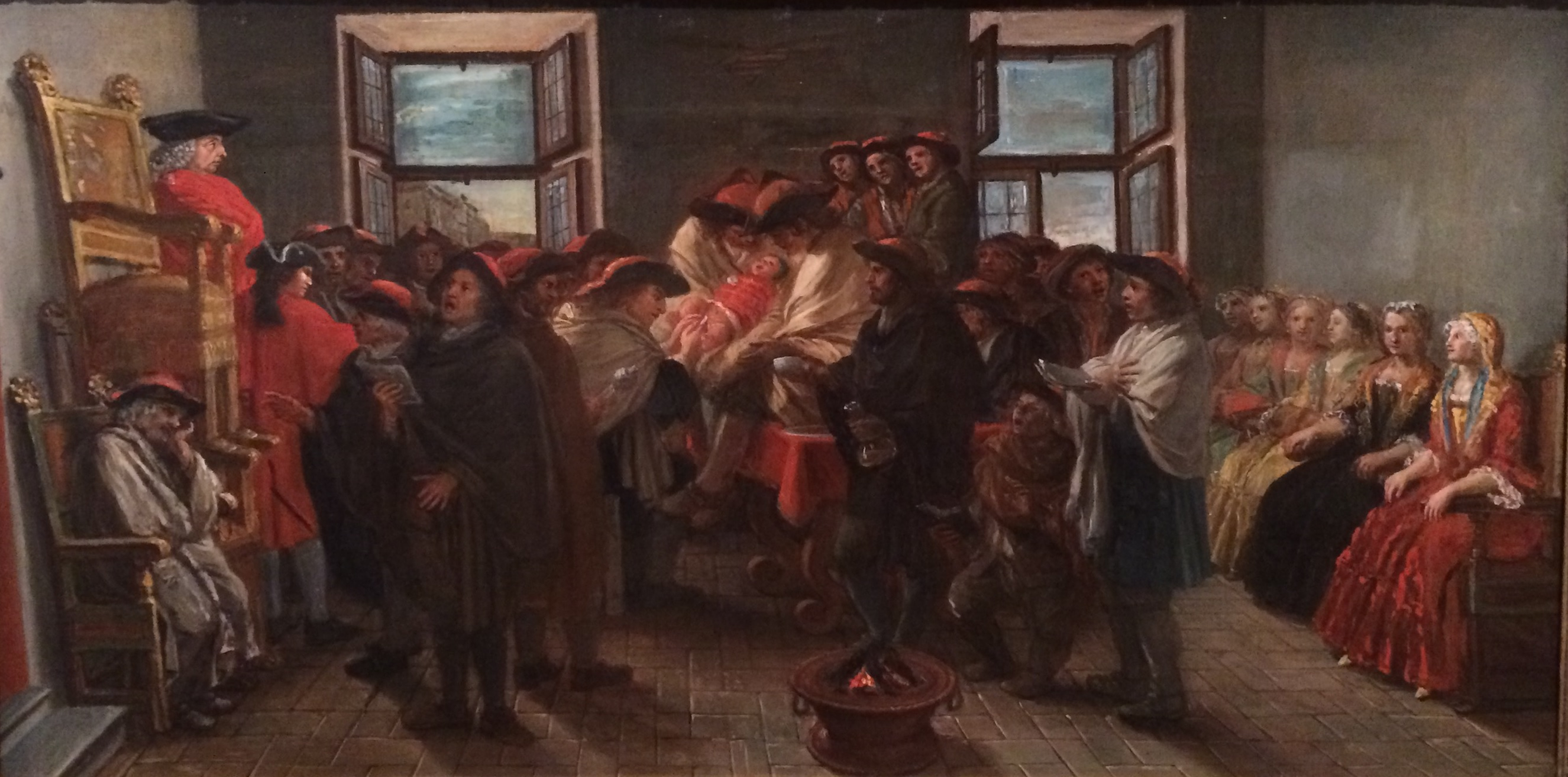
Jewish Wedding and A circumcision, Venice, c. 1780, by Marco Marcuola

A year later, however, on March 29, 1516, Doge Leonardo Loredan and the senators of the Republic of Venice enacted a decree to formally isolate the Jews of Venice. According to Robert Finlay, a major factor of why the Venetian government decided to go through with isolation this time were the previous defeats the Venetian Republic had suffered, which were seen as divine punishment, and that it was thought that the action would result in divine approbation.

In the decree, the Republic obliged the Jews to live in an area of the city where the foundries, known in Venetian as geto, had been situated in ancient times, to wear a sign of identification and to manage the city's pawnshops at rates established by La Serenissima. Separated into two sections, ghetto vecchio and ghetto nuovo, the Venetian ghetto was home to about 700 Jews in the year 1516. Many other onerous regulations were also included, in exchange for which the Community was granted the freedom to practice its faith and protection in the case of war. Another regulation that existed in reference to the Venetian ghetto was the restriction to non-Venetian Jewish merchants who were wanting to work in Venice. This restriction originated in 1541. There was little to no accommodations for Jewish merchants traveling to Venice in the existing ghetto and it was a requirement for all Jews to live in the Venetian Ghetto even if it was temporary. Under the permission and discretion of government officials, Jewish merchants living in Venice temporarily were allowed to move into the ghetto vecchio under the guise that none of them would move to Venice permanently or bring their families.

The first Jews to comply with the decree were Ashkenazi from Central Europe. They used to melt metal, getto in Venetian, as their one in two options of income. The other choice was selling secondhand items and clothing. When the Germans came, their guttural pronunciation changed the Venetian term from getto into ghetto, creating the word still used today to indicate various places of emargination. The ghetto was closed from 6 p.m. every night to 12 p.m. the next day. The boats of the Christian guards scoured the surrounding canals to impede nocturnal violations. This is how Europe's first ghetto was born. Known as Scole, the synagogues of the Venetian ghetto were constructed between the early-16th and mid-17th centuries. (The word scole (σχολή) can be compared with the Yiddish shul, the German Schule, the Italian scuola, or the English school.) Each represented a different ethnic group that had settled here stably and obtained a guarantee of religious freedom: the German and Canton Scole practiced the Ashkenazi rite; the Italian, the Italian rite and the Levantine and Spanish, the Sephardic rite. Despite a few later interventions, these synagogues have remained intact over time and testify to the importance of the Venetian ghetto. The unusual tall buildings found here were divided into floors of sub-standard height, demonstrating how the density of the population had increased over the years.

=== Hebrew Book Printing ===
In the early sixteenth century, Venice became the center for Hebrew book printing. While Jews were not allowed to print by themselves, they collaborated with non-Jews such as Daniel Bomberg, who became the dominant printer of Hebrew books between 1515 and 1535. Hebrew books during that period were exported as far as Egypt and Syria. This period ended after the Reformation when, during the heightened tension of the Counter-Reformation the Bragadin-Giustiniani dispute sparked renewed debate about the Talmud and resulted in the burning of the Talmud as well as other books in Venice.

== Modern era ==
After the fall of the Venetian Republic in 1797, Napoleon decreed the end of the Jewish segregation and the equalization of the Jews to other citizens. This provision became definitive when Venice was annexed to the Italian Kingdom.

== Rise of fascism and the Holocaust ==
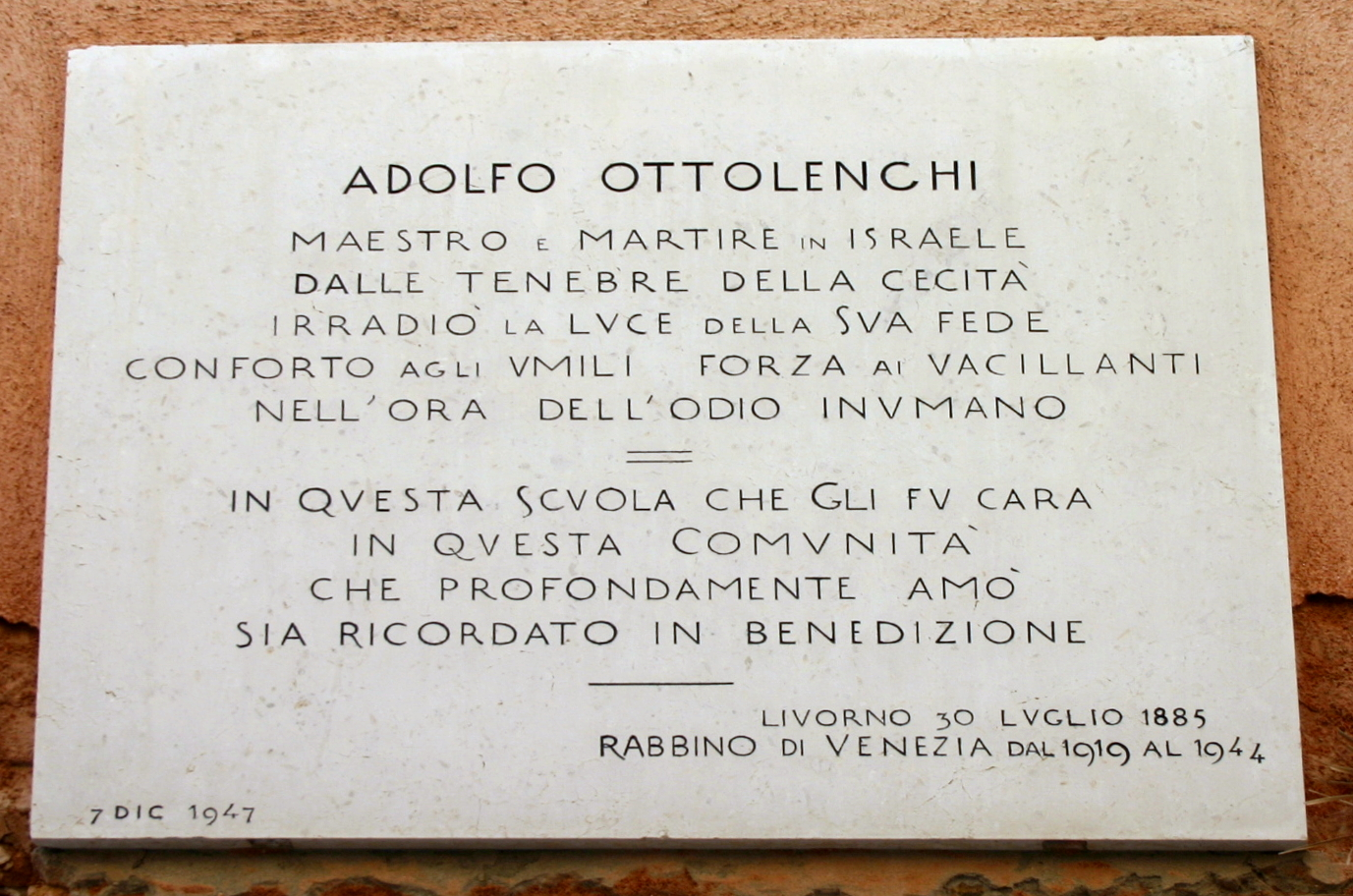
Memorial tablet to Adolfo Ottolenghi

In September 1938, the promulgation of the fascist racial laws deprived the Jews of civil rights, and the Jewish community entered a difficult period under the leadership first of Aldo Finzi and subsequently (from June 1940) of Professor Giuseppe Jona.

In September 1943, Italy changed from being an ally of Nazi Germany into an occupied country, and the Nazis started a systematic hunt for Jews in Venice as in other Italian cities. On 17 September, Professor Jona committed suicide rather than hand over to the German authorities a list of Jewish community residents.

In November 1943, Jews were declared 'enemy aliens' in accordance with the manifesto of the Italian Social Republic, to be arrested and their property seized. Although some Jews managed to escape to neutral Switzerland or Allied-occupied southern Italy, over two hundred were rounded up, most between 5 December 1943 (when approximately 150 were arrested) and late summer 1944. They were held at the city's Marco Foscarini college, the women's prison on Giudecca, the prison at Santa Maria Maggiore and subsequently at Fossoli concentration camp, before being deported, in most cases, to Auschwitz-Birkenau in 1944. Those arrested later in 1944 included some 20 residents of a Jewish convalescence home, the Casa di Ricovero Israelitica (including Venice's Chief Rabbi, Adolfo Ottolenghi, who chose to follow the fate of his fellow deportees) and 29 from a Jewish hospital. Most of those arrested in the summer of 1944 spent time incarcerated at Risiera di San Sabba concentration camp, Trieste. Although a figure of two hundred and five Jewish deportees from Venice between November 1943 and August 1944 is often quoted, one source give the higher figure of 246, which includes those deported to Trieste, some of whom died there, and a smaller number of arrests after this point up until the end of the war. Only 8 Jewish residents of Venice emerged from the death camps. The 1938 Jewish population of Venice (2000) was reduced by the war's end to 1500, or in some sources 1050.

A memorial plaque to Venice's Holocaust victims can be seen in Venice's Campo del Ghetto Nuovo, close to a memorial sculpture by Arbit Blatas. Chief Rabbi Adolfo Ottolenghi is also commemorated there in a memorial tablet, as well as by a memorial woodland at Mestre.

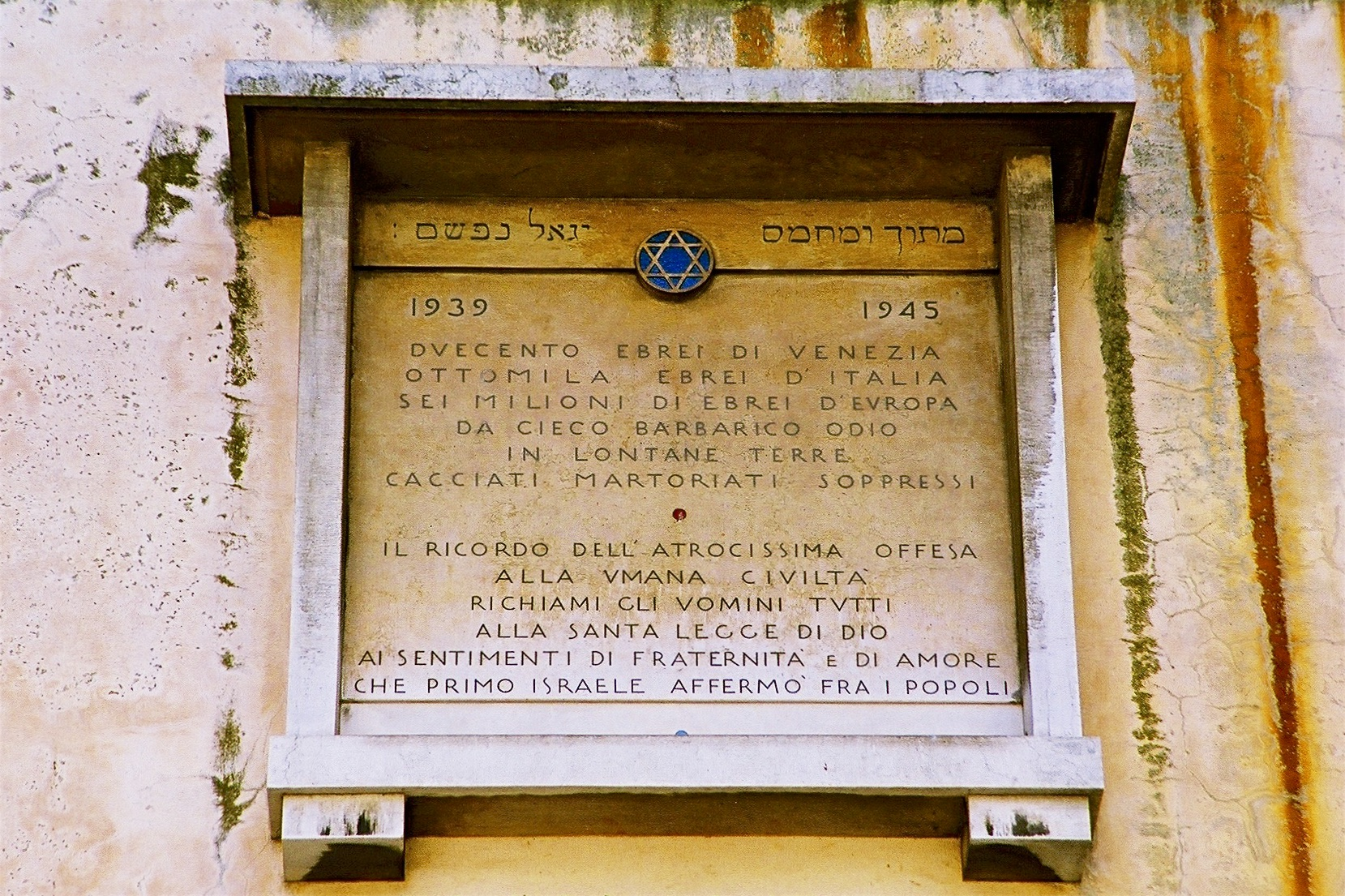
A memorial plaque to Venice's Holocaust victims in Campo del Ghetto Nuovo, Venice

== Today ==
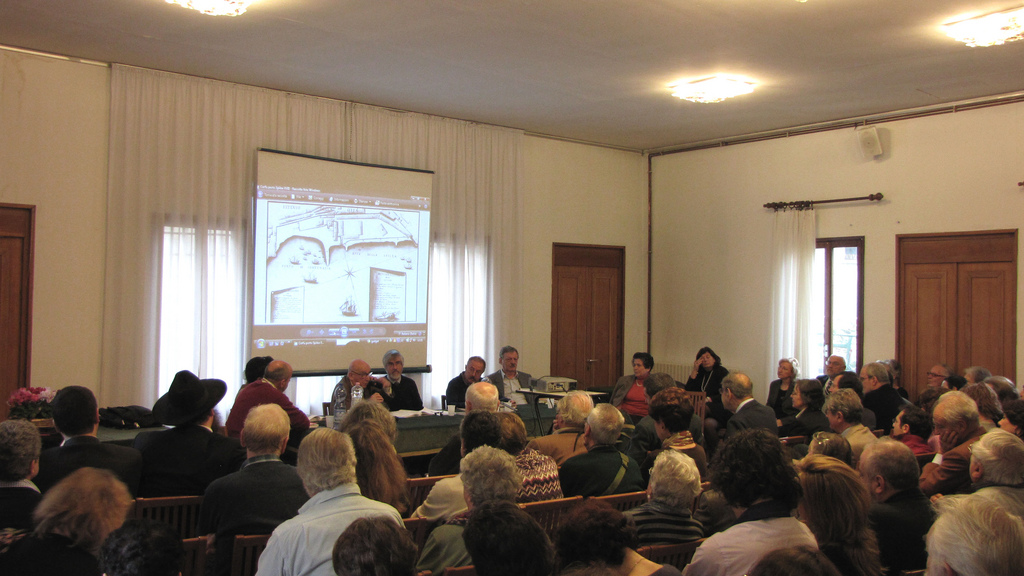
International conference on Hebrew Studies - 2009 - Yeudim de Yavan

The former ghetto is now a popular district of the city where the religious and administrative institutions of the Jewish Community and its five synagogues persist.

== Library ==
The Renato Maestro Library and Archives was opened in the Venetian Ghetto via private funding in 1981.

Its main goal is to make a wide range of resources on Judaism, Jewish civilization, and particularly the history of Italian and Venetian Jews, accessible to a vast public, and to promote knowledge of all these subjects. The library owns a large collection of documents and publications on the Jewish community dating from the 17th century.

The catalogue of modern books numbers 8,000 titles in Italian, English, French, German, and Hebrew. The Catalogue of Ancient Hebrew Books includes 2,500 volumes (16th–19th century). The library subscribes to thirty-five periodicals and several others, totaling one hundred, are available.

== Language ==
The Jewish community of Venice had its own language, a dialect of Judeo-Italian known as Judeo-Venetian. Though it is now extinct, it is attested through various writings and was based on Venetian with many Hebrew loanwords.

== Museum ==
The Jewish Museum of Venice is situated in the Campo of the Ghetto Novo, between the two most ancient Venetian synagogues. It is a small museum founded in 1953 by the Jewish Community of Venice.

The precious objects shown to public, important examples of goldsmith and textile manufacture made between the 16th and the 19th centuries are a lively witnessing of the Jewish tradition. The first room of the museum is dedicated to silver wares reminding the most important Jewish festivities starting from Shabbat (windows 1 and 2). With the objects displayed in window 3 the Days of Repentance, Rosh Ha Shanà and Yom Kippur, opening the Jewish year, are introduced.

The display of festivities continues with Channukkà (the Inauguration), a festivity during which nine-branch-lamps are lighted at home and in the synagogue (every day a further lamp is lit). In windows 5 and 6 you can admire several examples of these lamps).

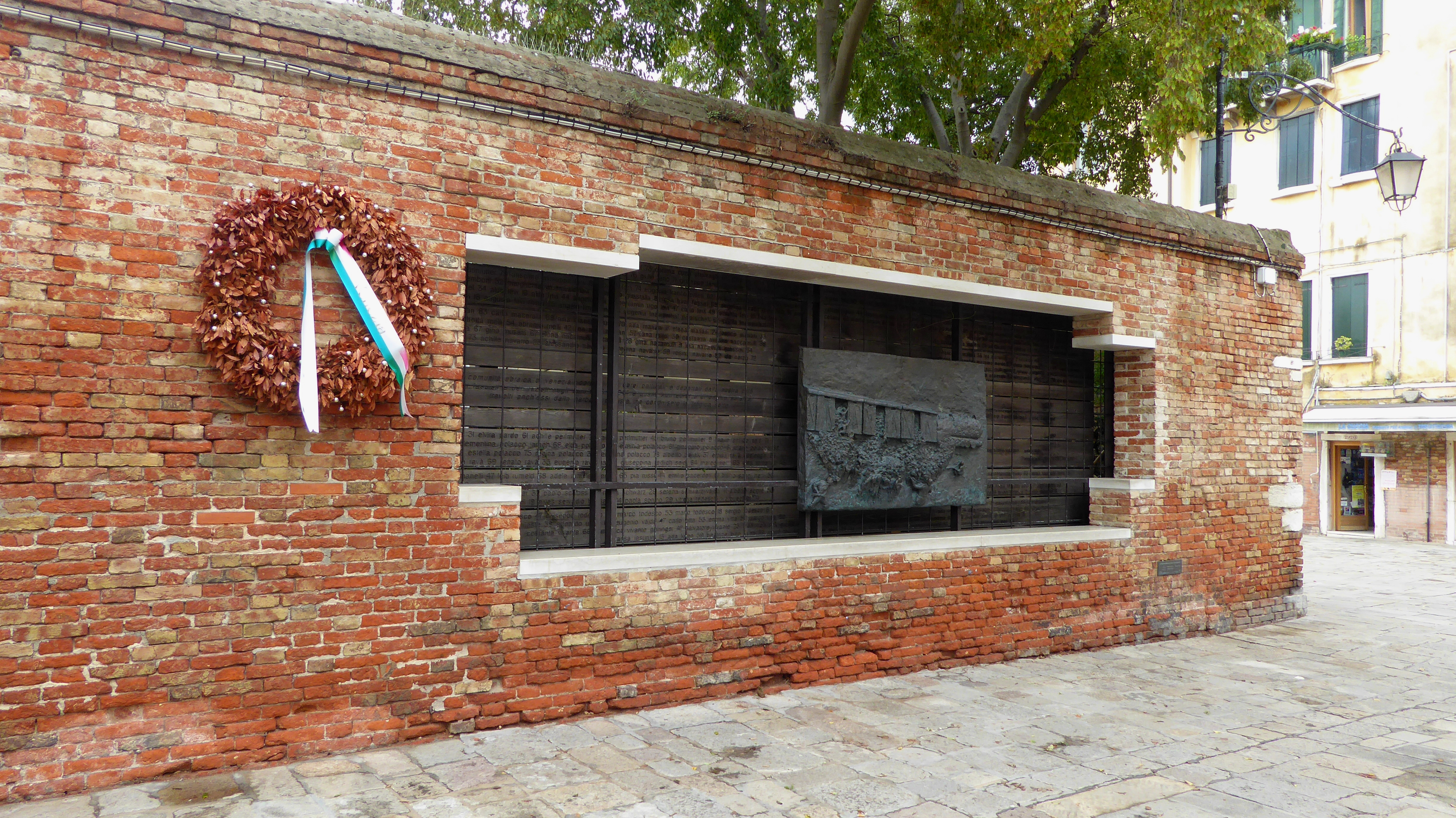
Holocaust Memorial in the Ghetto

The festivity of Purim happens about at the end of winter and it is a feast of joy during which Meghillat Ester is read (the scroll of handwritten manuscript where this story is told is on display on window 8. Pesach (Passover), feast of unleavened bread, of spring and of pilgrimage, is a joyful feast commemorating the liberation from slavery in Ancient Egypt. A big tray for the Seder di Pesach is on display on window 7.

Place of honour, in the first room of the museum, is given to the Sefer Torah (Scroll of Divine Law). It is a manuscript, executed in a ritual way, of Pentateuch. The Scroll of Divine Law is covered with a mantle (Meil), a crown (Atarah), symbol of the royalty of the Lord. Often a silver dedicatory plaque (Tass)(window 11) is hanged over the Scroll of Divine Law. In many cases the inscription of the Ten Commandments or the title of the passage read in a given solemnity is carved in the plaque.

The Scroll of Divine Law, covered with the Meil and the Atarah is kept inside the synagogue, in the 'Aron Ha Kodesh (Ark of Holiness). To help the reading of the scroll a little decorated silver stick, ending with a little hand is used (Yad). There are many examples of this on window 11.

The second room of the museum is instead mostly dedicated to textile manufacture, related of course to Jewish tradition.There are examples of Meil and other precious coverings used to decorate the Torah, but you can particularly find beautiful examples of Parokhet, curtains to cover the doors of 'Aron Ha Kodesh.

Besides this room are several Ketubboth, a form of wedding contract for the protection of woman in case of dissolution of marriage, allowed by Jewish tradition; and a 1779 set of clothes for the circumcision, rite of basic importance that shows the entrance of the new-born Jewish boy in the alliance stipulated by the Lord with Abraham and his descendants.

== Cemetery ==
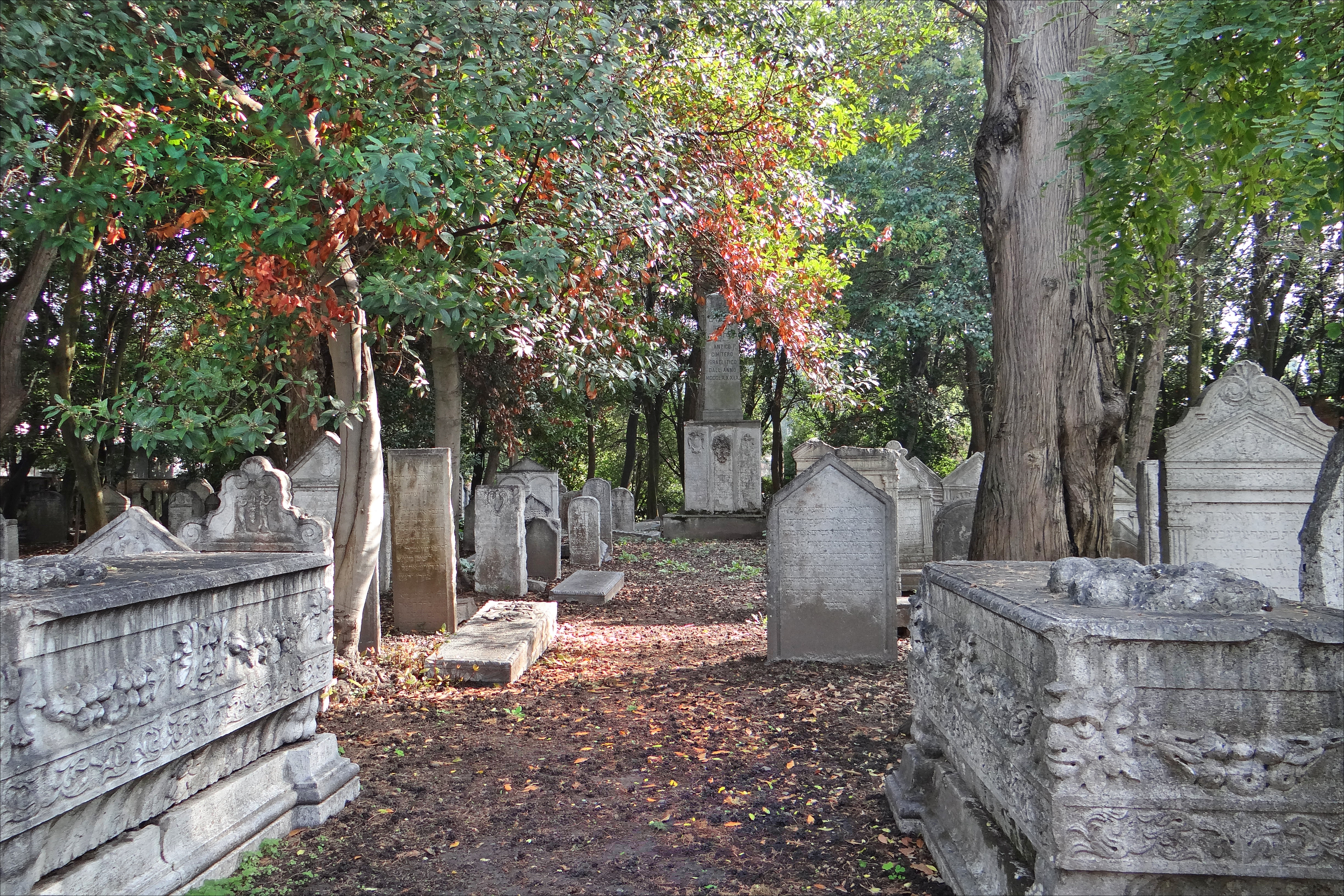
Old Jewish Cemetery of Venice (Antico Cimitero Ebraico di Venezia)

The Republic of Venice gave the Jews the possibility to create a cemetery of their own in 1386, giving them a non-cultivated piece of land in St. Nicholas of Lido, whose property was however claimed by the monastery at Lido di Venezia.

At the end of the disputation with the monks the cemetery, starting from 1389, was used with no interruptions and later made bigger reaching its top expansion in 1641. After this date, the widening of system of fortification of the Lido, wanted by the Serenissima Republic to defend itself from the Ottoman Empire, brought to a slow but constant reshaping of the cemetery spaces southbound, so that in 1736 the "University of Jews" was forced to buy a piece of land bordering it.

The fall of the Venetian Republic, the foreign occupations and the consequent vandalism, as well as the atmospheric agents brought to the disappearance of many monuments and to the ruin of the Jewish cemetery. In the 19th century, because of the project to make the Lido of Venice healthier and competitive, part of the Cemetery (now belonging to the state) was expropriated and bound to other uses. Later, some attempts to restore it began, without outcome and in 1938 (promulgation of Italian Racial laws) the cemetery was definitely abandoned.

In 1999, thanks to the collaboration of public and private enterprises, both from Italy and abroad, restoration of Antico Cimitero Ebraico di Venezia has begun; many memorials have been saved and classified more than 1000 of them which can be dated between 1550 and the early 18th century.

== See also ==
- Venetian Ghetto
- History of the Jews in Italy
- History of the Jews in Calabria
- History of the Jews in Livorno
- History of the Jews in Naples
- History of the Jews in the Roman Empire
- History of the Jews in Sicily
- History of the Jews in Trieste
- History of the Jews in Turin
- The Merchant of Venice

== Bibliography ==
- Davis, Robert C.; Ravid, Benjamin (28 March 2001). The Jews of Early Modern Venice. JHU Press. ISBN 978-0-8018-6512-1.
- Finlay, Robert (1982). "The Foundation of the Ghetto: Venice, the Jews, and the War of the League of Cambrai". Proceedings of the American Philosophical Society. 126 (2): 140–154. ISSN 0003-049X. JSTOR 986357.
- Voghera, Gadi Luzzatto ed. (2017). La Bibbia miniata della Comunita ebraica di Venezia; The Illuminated Bible of the Jewish Community of Venice. Saonara: il Prato. ISBN 978-8-863-36431-6
