= History of the Jews in Sardinia =

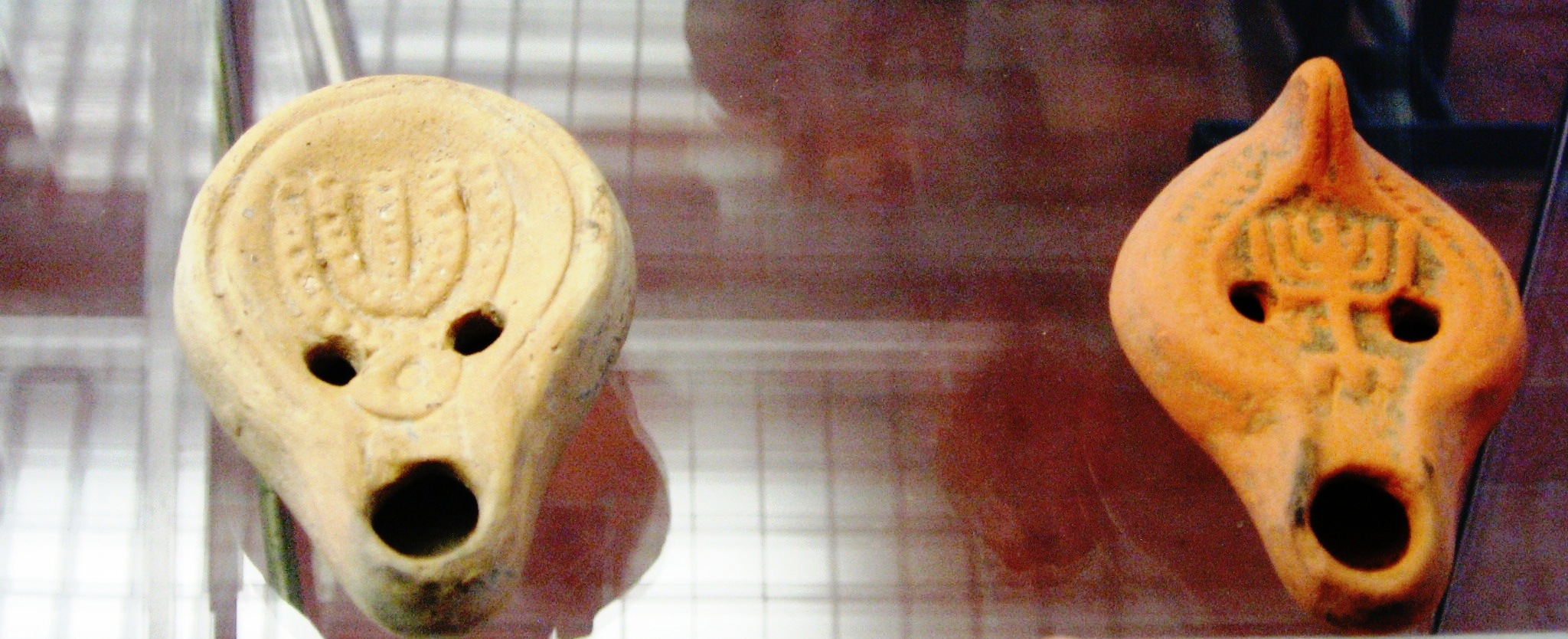
Roman-era oil lamps decorated with menorahs from Sassari.

The history of the Jews in Sardinia can be traced three millennia back. The modest Jewish community in Sardinia consisted of Sephardic Jews of Spanish and Italian descent.

== Early history ==
The first recorded mention of Jews in Sardinia occurred in the year 19, during the reign of Roman emperor Tiberius. 4000 Jews were exiled from Rome to Sardinia. Little recorded Jewish history of early Sardinia remains but it is presumed they led a quiet, provincial life with full rights along with the natives. When Christianity became the state religion of Rome, Jewish rights everywhere, including Sardinia, became curtailed. After the fall of Rome, a succession of foreign rulers became the governors of Sardinia and life for the Jews became increasingly harsh. Sardinia is one of the few places in Italy where there are catacombs containing Jewish inscriptions. The catacombs of Sant'Antioco date from the 4th and 5th centuries, and the inscriptions therein are in a form of Hebrew-Latin.

== Medieval history ==
In 1325, Sardinia fell under the rule of the Crown of Aragon. For the first century during Iberian rule, life was more or less pleasant for Sardinian Jews. During this time Spanish Jews began to arrive and settle on the island. The Jewish inhabitants of Marseille fleeing violence in 1484 and again in 1485, which led to an exodus of Jews from the city, settled in Sardinia which became home to about 200 Jewish families from Marseille Also, in 1485, the Jews of Sardinia were declared property of the King of Aragon and were governed by his authority alone.

Many Jewish families lived in the capital of the Kingdom of Sardinia, Cagliari, where there was a large synagogue. This synagogue was eventually forcibly converted into a Roman Catholic Church, which today goes by the name of Santa Croce However, the largest Jewish community in Sardinia was located in the city of Alghero. Many Jewish families were engaged in trade and other professions such as banking and medicine. While life was good for the Jews in Alghero, the Jews living in other Sardinian cities endured increasing intolerance. This included the establishment of Jewish ghettos and special identifying clothing as well as forced baptism. Any further Jewish immigration to Sardinia was halted under pain of death. A decree issued in 1481 fixed the penalties for an offense against Christianity and for the employment of Christian servants. In 1492, the Spanish crown with the Alhambra Decree ordered the expulsion of Jews from the Iberian Crown: later that year the Jews of Sardinia and Corsica were also ordered to leave. Thus, many Sardinian Jews arrived in Malta, Greece, and the Italian region of Calabria, which became a temporary home for other Sephardic refugees as well. Sardinia is also mentioned in the Spanish Inquisition records pertaining to a population of Marranos.

== Later history ==
During the 19th century, a modest number of Jewish families from Italy settled back on the island, which had been previously ceded to and made into a possession of the House of Savoy. Sardinian Jews were emancipated on March 29, 1848. In the years that followed, 180 Jews joined the army of the Savoyard Kingdom of Sardinia.

The Prime minister of Sardinia became embroiled in the Edgardo Mortara affair. A secret plot was hatched to kidnap the boy and bring him secretly to Sardinia.

By Italian law regulating Jewish communal organization in 1931, Sardinian Jews were under the jurisdiction of the Jewish community in Rome. Most of the Sardinian Jews were murdered during the Holocaust. There is no trace of the former Marrano population as well.

== See also ==
- Sardinian people
- History of Sardinia
