= History of the Jews in Apulia =

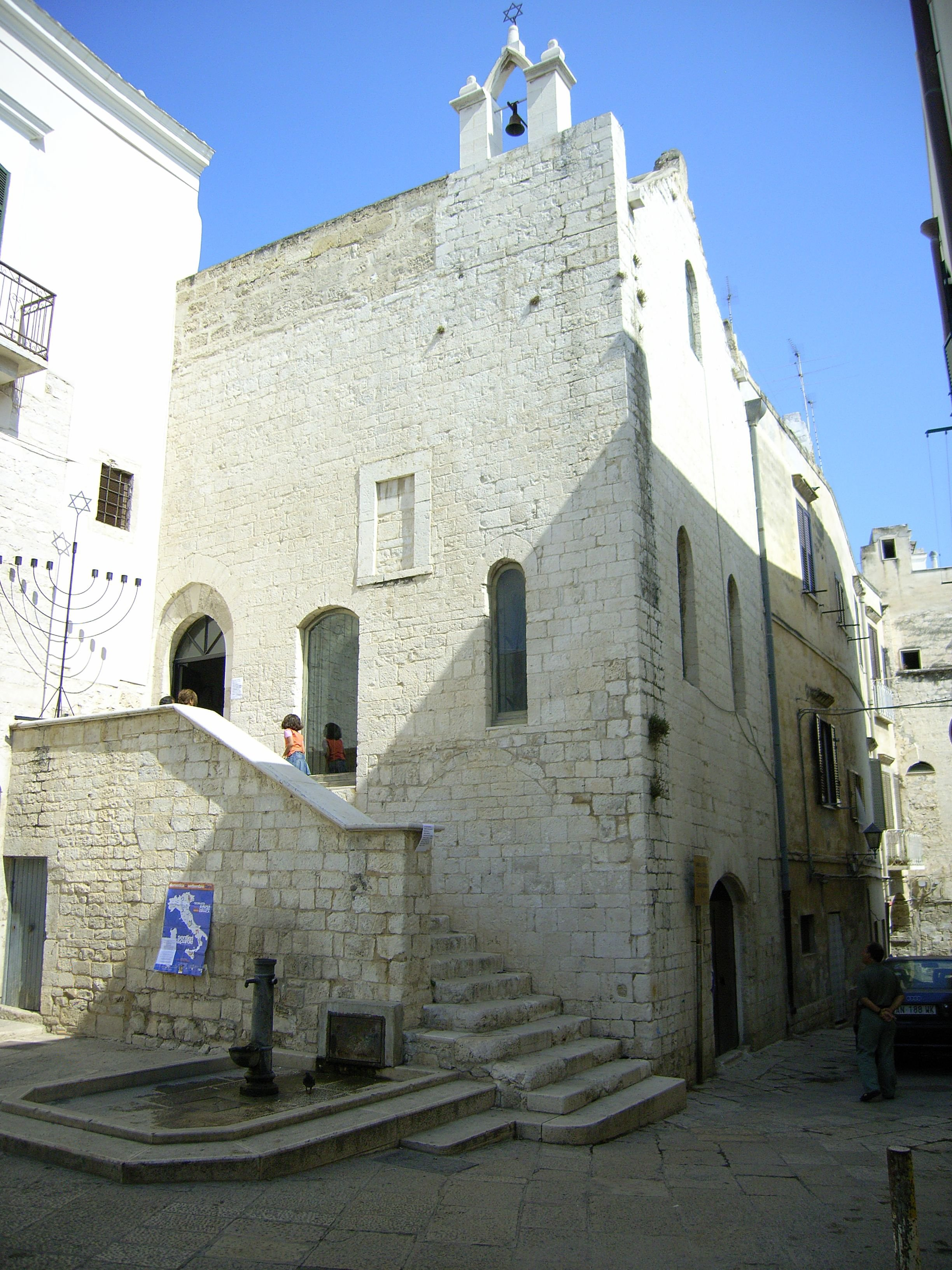
The 13th-century Scolanova synagogue, Trani

The history of the Jews in Apulia (called in Italian Puglia) can be traced back over two thousand years. Apulia (from the Greek Ἀπουλία, in Italian: Puglia, pronounced [ˈpuʎʎa]) in Hebrew :פוליה) is a region in the "heel of the boot" of the peninsula of Italy bordering the Adriatic Sea. The Jews have had a presence in Apulia for at least 2000 years. The Jews of Apulia had a rich Rabbinic tradition and also had a sizeable Jewish population in the central Mediterranean prior to their expulsion.

== Ancient history ==
Apulia was once part of the ancient Roman province of Bruttium, then became part of the Italian region of Calabria until its distinction today as a separate area. In the 1st century, Roman records tell of the Jewish communities of Bari, Oria, Otranto, and Taranto.

Other legends tell of Jewish captives deported from Judea by the Roman Emperor Titus after the fall of Jerusalem in the year 70. According to medieval Jewish sources, around 5,000 Jewish captives taken by Titus were resettled in various cities in Apulia, including Oria, Otranto, and Trani.

Official documents from the Western Roman emperor Honorius in the year 398, confirm there were several Jewish communities in Apulia. The many tombstone inscriptions, some entirely or partially written in Hebrew, found in Trani, Taranto, Matera, Bari, Brindisi, Otranto, and Oria shows the large number of Jews settled in the region, and the usage of Hebrew. Inscriptions found in the town of Venosa (nowadays in Basilicata but previously in Apulia) mention the communal organization of Jewish life in southern Italy. After the fall of the Roman Empire, the region of Apulia fell under the rule of the Byzantine Empire and during the 9th century. This opened a troubling time of zealous Christian missionary effort for the region's Jews. In 875 and 925, Arab armies invaded and occupied parts of Apulia, resulting in much misery for the Jews, which forced many of them to flee for their lives. The Jewish court physician Shabbethai Donnolo lived in the Calabria/Apulia area in the tenth century and wrote of these times.

== Medieval history ==
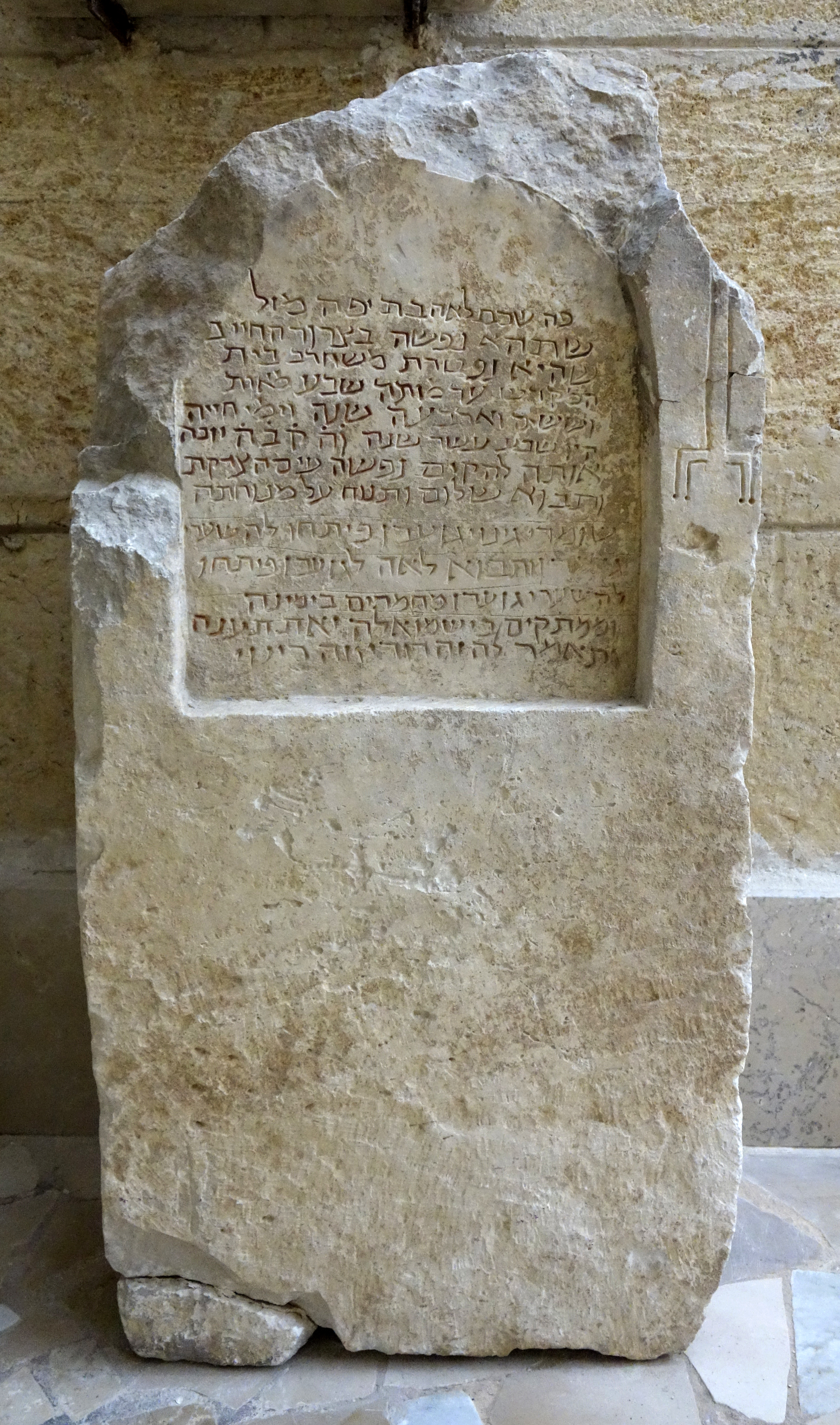
Funerary inscription of Leah, daughter of Yafeh Mazal, who died in 832/3 CE at age 17 (Museo archeologico provinciale Francesco Ribezzo, Brindisi)

During the early period of the Middle Ages, Calabria, Basilicata and Apulia forming the Catepanate of Italy were under Byzantine rule. By the 11th century, the region was again a peaceful haven for the Jews. During this time many Apulian Torah scholars had regular contact with the Rabbinic academies of the east. The Chronicle of Ahimaaz in 1054 contains many details on Apulian Jewry. Apulian poets of the time include Shephatiah of Oria who wrote the poem "Yisrael Nosha" which is included in the Neilah service on the Day of Atonement in the Ashkenazi liturgy. Amittai in Oria, and Silano in Venosa were also well-known poets. Torah scholars are mentioned from the middle of the tenth century in Bari, Oria, and Otranto. The Josippon chronicle, composed sometime in the mid-tenth century, is a product of the southern Italian Jewish/Hebrew culture. The south Italian Jewry contributed to the early Ashkenazi culture in central Europe. The Jews of France and Germany recognized the scholarship of the Apulian center as late as the 12th century. This is acknowledged in a quote by the French Tosafist, Jacob ben Meir: "For out of Bari goes forth the Law and the word of the Lord from Otranto" Other rabbinic scholars of Apulia in the 13th century include Isaiah ben Mali of Trani (the Elder), his grandson Isaiah ben Elijah of Trani, and Solomon ben ha-Yatom. The lives of the Jews in Apulia continued to be tolerable until the end of the 13th century. Jews in Apulia owned land and were employed in crafts, such as the dyeing industry. Thomas Aquinas, a native of southern Italy, refers to the employment of the Jews in southern Italy in 1274, saying: "it would do better to compel the Jews to work for their living, as is done in parts of Italy, than to allow them… to grow rich by usury."

Toleration of the Jews in Apulia came to end when Apulia, as well as other parts of southern Italy, fell to the Kingdom of Naples. King Charles II of Anjou ordered the forced baptism of all Jews in his realm. Many Apulian Jews fled to neighboring central Italy and northern Italy. Many also moved to the Germanic areas of central Europe. All synagogues at that time were converted into Roman Catholic churches and all Torah academies were closed. Many of the Jews who had been coerced into Christianity still practiced the Jewish faith in secret. These Jews became the historic population of Neofiti. These Crypto-Jews, also known in Hebrew as Anusim, were frequently compelled to live in special quarters known as Giudecca. They were regarded by the local Catholic population as heretics. In 1311 King Robert directed that those who had either secretly practised or relapsed back into Judaism should be severely punished; the order was renewed in 1343 by Joanna I. Both Jews and Neofiti who had again settled in Apulia in the 15th century were subjected to mob attacks occurring in Bari and Lecce in 1463. In Trani, local campaigns aimed to exclude neofiti from public office, which led many of them to migrate to the nearby city of Barletta until King Ferrante intervened in their favor. The invasion of Otranto by the Ottoman Turks in 1480 led to a large massacre of Jews who lived in the area.

In 1492, after the expulsion of the Jews from Spain, many Spanish and Portuguese Jews settled in Apulia. This led to a small revival of Jewish life in the area. Isaac Abrabanel lived in Apulia at this time after leaving Spain. However, the revival was short lived. In 1495, the Kingdom of Naples fell to the French and King Charles VIII ordered more restrictions to be placed on the Jews of Apulia. Also in 1495, the Jews of Lecce were massacred and the Jewish quarter was burned to the ground. In Barletta, local hatred was stoked by tensions over Jewish pawnbroking. Frightened Jews in Barletta destroyed their records of debts but failed to return pawned items. This resulted in an appeal by local Christians to Charles VIII to expel the Barlettan Jews, arguing they were "enemies of the Christians and would set a bad example for those who have recently converted." To the amazement of the local Christians, the new French government forbade the expulsion. Lecce was the birthplace of Abraham de Balmes a noted Hebrew expert. One Balmes' pupils was Daniel Bomberg.

During the 15th century, political tensions in nearby Trani drove many Neofiti to migrate to Barletta. After the 1413 quotas set by King Ladislas that guaranteed Neofiti representation on the city council were dismantled, local campaigns sought to exclude them entirely. Seeking refuge in Barletta, these Neofiti formed a tight-knit merchant class (mercatores) that predominantly intermarried and conducted business within their own group.

In 1495 one-third of the population of the town of Martina Franca, Italy, was made of practising Jews or Jews converted to Christianity. The escape involved one-third of the population: 150–200 families (at least one thousand people). Among the privileges granted the city council of Martina Franca (Taranto) in 1495, King Frederick of Aragon forbade Crypto-Jews and Neofiti to press charges against those who robbed them (probably during the riots of 1494–1495 during the French invasion of the Kingdom of Naples) and prohibited their coming to live in that city. Also in 1495, the Jews of Martina Franca were massacred.

When Apulia fell to the Spanish in 1510, the beginning of the end was in sight for the Apulian Jews. The Spanish Inquisition reached Apulia because of the large number of Jews, Crypto-Jews and Neofiti living in the area. A series of expulsions started 1511. Most Jews and Neofiti were expelled and or tortured to death. Most Jewish property was seized and all remaining synagogues were rededicated as Catholic churches. Despite these hostilities, some Conversos were still able to hold lesser administrative offices in the region; for example, Baltazar Galzerano ran the customs house at Barletta.

By 1540, the last expulsion finally ended Jewish life in Apulia. Most remaining Crypto-Jews were driven so deep underground that their presence finally came to an end as well. Some of the Apulian Jewish refugees fled north. However, most of them settled in Greece or the Aegean islands. The Apulian Jews set up new congregations in Corfu, Arta and Salonika. The last remnants of the Apulian Jews were murdered during the Holocaust.

The area in Martina Franca where the Jews used to live is the one between "u'Curdunnidde" and Vico Montedoro (this is a Jewish name, present also in Taranto and Naples). Before the anti-Semite laws (1938), the population called that area Giudecca (the Jewish quarter). There was a synagogue at the foot of Montedoro; it might be the present cloister of St. Dominic. The Jewish cemetery was outside the walls. Perhaps the cloister of St. Anthony is all that is left.

== Modern times ==
In 2006, the orthodox Scolanova Synagogue was rededicated and opened for worship in Apulian city of Trani. The synagogue was built in the 13th century but seized by the Roman Catholic Church in 1380 and converted into a church. A congregation of Jews of San Nicandro and Apulian Gerim descended from Neofiti families, worship in the synagogue regularly. Also in Trani, the Scolagrande Synagogue was acquired by the Roman Catholic Church in 1380, renamed as the St. Anne's Church (Italian: Chiesa di Sant’Anna), and, in 2004 returned to the Jewish community for use as a synagogue and as a Jewish museum.

== Language and culture ==
It is known that the early Jewish inhabitants in southern Italy including Apulia, spoke mostly Greek and Latin as their vernacular. Later this evolved into the hybrid languages Jewish Koine Greek and Judeo-Latin. After the decline of the Roman Empire, The Jewish Koine became to Judaeo-Greek and Judeo-Latin gave way to different forms of Judeo-Italian known as "Italki". The Jewish community of Salento (at that time a region inhabited mostly by Greek Christians) was in the Middle Ages Greek-speaking while the rural Jews in the outland of Salento spoke mostly Judaeo-Italian. However, the Jews originated from Apulia followed uniformly the Romaniote Prayer custom, though with some own peculiarities and piyyutim. After the expulsion of the Jews from southern Italy, either Yevanic and Italki remained their mother tongue in their new settlements in Greece. Some of the best known examples of spoken Italki were found at the Jews of Corfu. Italki is now virtually extinct as a spoken language with the deaths of the Italian Jews as a result of the Holocaust.

== Astrology ==
Despite Mosaic prohibitions, Astrology was widely practiced in Apulia. An Apulian Jew by the name of Paltiel, a descendant of Hananeel ben Amittai and owing his distinction to astrology, became the friend and counselor of the calif Abu Tamim Maad, conqueror of Egypt and builder of Cairo. The friendship began in Italy on the occasion of one of the Apulian invasions led by Abu Tamim Maad. Paltiel achieved distinction among the Jews of Egypt in the second half of the tenth century and was given the title of "Naggid."

== Star of David ==
The earliest known depiction of the Star of David as a Jewish symbol appears on a Jewish tombstone in the Apulian town of Taranto. The Jews of Apulia were noted for their scholarship in Kabbalah, which has been assumed to be the genesis of the Star of David.
