= Judaeo-Romance languages =

Judaeo-Romance languages are Jewish languages derived from Romance languages, spoken by various Jewish communities (and their descendants) originating in regions where Romance languages predominate, and altered to such an extent to gain recognition as languages in their own right. The status of many Judaeo-Romance languages is controversial as, despite manuscripts preserving transcriptions of Romance languages using the Hebrew alphabet, there is often little-to-no evidence that these "dialects" were actually spoken by Jews living in the various European nations.

== Languages ==
=== Judaeo-Aragonese ===
Judaeo-Aragonese was spoken in north-central Spain from the around the mid-8th century to around the time of the Alhambra Decree, which expelled Jews from Spain. Later, it either merged with the various Judeo-Spanish dialects or fell out of use, to be replaced by the far more influential Judeo-Spanish dialects from Southern Spain, especially in the areas occupied by the modern lands of Valencia, Murcia and Andalucia.

=== Jewish Brazilian Portuguese ===
Jewish Brazilian Portuguese is a variety of Brazilian Portuguese incorporates Hebrew and Yiddish phrases. Sephardi communities also borrow from Ladino.

=== Judaeo-Catalan ===
Judaeo-Catalan also known as Catalanic, was a Catalan dialect in Catalonia, Valencia and the Balearic Islands that was spoken before the 1492 expulsion of the Alhambra Decree. It is unknown when Jews abandoned the language. While numerous Catalan texts written in the Hebrew alphabet survive, whether or not they truly represent a dialect is debated. Some scholars, while conceding that the evidence for the language is scarce, still defend Judaeo-Catalan's status as a language, whereas other scholars deny such a language ever truly existed, or, contend that the evidence is too limited to take any position on the matter at all.

=== Jewish French ===
Jewish French is an ethnolect of French spoken by 200-300 French Jews. Unlike most other Judeo-Romance languages, it is considered not to be in decline, but instead is doing well. It contains some influence from Yiddish and Israeli Hebrew, as well as from Judeo-Arabic introduced by Mizrahi Jews who moved to France after being expelled from North Africa. Today there exist both digital and print media in Jewish French. It is not descendent from Zarphatic.

==== Southern Jewish French ====
This is a dialect of French spoken by 50-100 Jews in southern France. It contains influence from all three of the Judeo-Occitan languages particularly Judeo-Gascon.

=== Judaeo-Italian ===
Judaeo-Italian, sometimes called "Italkian", a term coined by Solomon Birnbaum in 1942, has gone extinct except for one variety, now spoken fluently by fewer than 200 people. They speak the last remnant of the widely variant Judaeo-Italian languages spoken throughout Italy and Corfu and along the eastern shores of the Adriatic Sea and the Ionian Sea. The language may have had some influence on the development of Yiddish. The language is not as well preserved as larger Jewish languages like Ladino and much of what is documented was made to preserve the language. It had several varieties which were:

==== Judaeo-Latin ====
Judaeo-Latin is a hypothetical language covering a range of geographical and register varieties of Latin. It is postulated to have been spoken in specific Jewish communities of the Roman Empire. A small corpus of Latin texts from the Middle Ages written in the Hebrew alphabet exist, but they are insufficient to indicate a commonly spoken ethnolect, and thus the existence of a veritable Jewish Latin language is pure conjecture.

==== Judaeo-Piedmontese ====
Judaeo-Piedmontese was a language spoken by Jews in Piedmont, Northwest Italy from around the 16th century to the Second World War. It was based on Piedmontese, a Gallo-Italian language close to Provençal, with many loanwords from Classical Hebrew. Italian author Primo Levi, who was born within the Piedmontese Jewish community, describes the language briefly in the opening chapter of his book The Periodic Table. It went extinct circa 2015

==== Bagitto ====
Bagitto also known as Judeo-Livornese was a dialect or slang used by the Jews of Livorno. Though extinct many works in it were written by Guido Bedarida. It contained many loanwords from Spanish, Portuguese, and Ladino.

==== Judeo-Salentinian ====
A now extinct dialect of Salentino used by Jews in Salento and Corfu. The oldest text in Salentino is in the margin notes of a copy of the Mishnah from 1072 to 1073 known as Parma A which is in Judeo-Salentinian.

==== Judeo-Roman ====
Judeo-Roman is the only variety of Judeo-Italian which is not extinct. It is moribund, and is spoken by 250 elderly people 200 of which are in Italy. There are groups trying to preserve the language. There is a theater groups called Chaimme 'a sore 'o sediaro e 'a moje (Chaim, the sister, the chairmaker and the wife) makes plays in Judeo-Roman, some which are available on YouTube. There are also poems in Judeo-Roman by Crescenzo del Monte.

==== Judeo-Mantuan ====
Judeo-Mantuan was a dialect of Judeo-Italian spoken in and around the Italian city of Mantua. It dropped the Italian e at the end of words (far instead of fare). It is attested through several poems by a Jewish physician Annibale Gallico, made from 1876 to 1935.

==== Other varieties ====
Other varieties of Judeo-Italian are:

- Judeo-Modenese (Giudeo-Modenese) in Modena
- Judeo-Pitigliano (Giudeo-Pitigliano) in Tuscany
- Judeo-Reggiano (Giudeo-Reggiano) in Reggio Emilia
- Judeo-Resan (Giudeo-Resab) in the region of Reggio Emilia of Emilia-Romagna
- Judeo-Venetian (Giudeo-Veneziano) in Venice
- Judeo-Ferrarese (Giudeo-Ferrarese) in Ferrara
- Judeo-Florentine (Giudeo-Fiorentino) in Florence
- Judeo-Torinese (Giudeo-Torinese) in Turin

There are few samples of these languages.

=== Jewish Latin American Spanish ===
Jewish Latin America Spanish is variety of Spanish spoken by the by 300,000 members of the Jewish community of Latin America. It contains loanwords from Aramaic, Modern Hebrew, Yiddish, and Ladino. Though older varieties have more Aramaic, Ladino, and Yiddish loanwords while the version spoken by younger generations has more Modern Hebrew loanwords.

=== Judaeo-Occitan ===
There exists three distinct, now extinct varieties of the Occitan language spoken by Jews.

==== Judaeo-Provençal ====
was the language that developed in Provence and in the rest of medieval southern France. Judaeo-Occitan had several unique phonemic changes in Hebrew loanwords. Use of Judaeo-Provençal began to decline following the expulsion of the Jews from France in 1498 and continued with the spread of French language in the southern parts of the country. This decline accelerated with the emancipation of the Jews during the French Revolution which enabled Provençal Jews to migrate and settle outside of Provence. it finally died when the last speaker Armand Lunel, died in 1977. But Lunel only remembered a few words of the language.

===== Judeo-Niçard =====
A subdialect of the Niçard subdialect of Provençal spoken by the Jewish community in and around Nice. The least attested of the Judeo-Occitan dialects, Judeo-Niçard was spoken by the community of Jews living in Nice, descendants of local Jewish immigrants from Provence, Piedmont, and other Mediterranean communities. It is attested from a few documents from the 19th century. It contained significant influence in both vocabulary and grammar from Hebrew.

==== Judeo-Gascon ====
Judeo-Gascon was a sociolect of the Gascon dialect of Occitan spoken in Gascony it was spoken until the early 20th century. It had influence on Southern Jewish French with about 850 words a some morphological and grammatical changes from various languages being transferred to Southern Jewish French through Judeo-Gascon.

=== Judaeo-Portuguese ===
Judeo-Portuguese was the language spoken by the secret Jewish population of Portugal until the 16th century when it was extinct. A few vestigial archaism forms survived in secret religious rituals through small, unique Crypto-Jewish communities in the Belmonte municipality. While it is extinct as a spoken language it is still used in a limited liturgical sense.

=== Judaeo-Spanish ===
Judaeo-Spanish or Ladino is known by a number of other names. It is found in many varied regional dialects and is the modern descendant of the Spanish that was spoken by the Sephardi Jews, the descendants of Spain's large and influential Jewish population. After the 1492 Alhambra Decree mandated the expulsion of Spain's Jewish population of 300,000, Judaeo-Spanish spread throughout Europe and the Ottoman Empire, becoming the lingua franca of the Adriatic Sea. In 2017, it was formally recognized by the Royal Spanish Academy. It is mainly spoken by Sephardic Jews by only 133,000 of 1,000,000 Sephardic Jews speak it and it is classified as Definitely Endangered. Many of its speakers were killed during the Holocaust and most others would switch into the main languages of their countries. The largest Ladino speaking communities are in Israel (125K) and Turkey (8K) though tiny communities in Greece and Bosnia Herzegovina also exist with 12 and 4 speakers respectively.

==== Haketia ====
Haketia is an endangered dialect of Ladino spoken by 1000 North Africa Sephardim down from 30,000 in 1900, historically spoken in several Moroccan cities. It is differentiated by other dialects by its presence of Arabic influence. Unlike other Ladino dialects, Haketia does not have a literary tradition. Teutani is a subdialect of Haketia historically spoken in the Algerian city of Oran.

=== Zarphatic ===
Zarphatic, also known as Judeo-French, was a Jewish language of Northern France, Norman England, the Low Countries, and western Germany. It was used in a limited sense by Rashi. There is a debate over how different Judaeo French was from Old French, some believe it was a sociolect, dialect, or separate language. The term Zarphatic, coined by Solomon Birnbaum, comes from the Hebrew name for France, Tzarfat (צרפת)

== History and development ==
The exact development of the Judeo-Romance languages is unclear. The two predominant theories are that they are either descended from Judeo-Latin, and that their development paralleled that of Latin's daughter languages or that they are independent outgrowths of each individual language community. Another theory adopts parts of both, proposing that certain of the Judeo-Romance languages (variously, Zarphatic, Shuadit, Italkian and Catalanic) are descended from Judeo-Latin, but that others (variously, Zarphatic, Catalanic, Ladino, Judeo-Portuguese) are the product of independent development.

== Present status ==
Most Judaeo-Romance languages are extinct or facing serious risks of extinction. Assuming they actually existed, Judaeo-Latin died out in ancient times, while Judaeo-French and Judeo-Aragonese disappeared in the Middle Ages. Judeo-Portuguese ceased being used in Portugal in the 16th century, but survived in the Jewish diaspora until the late 18th century. Judaeo-Catalan died sometime between the Middle Ages and the Second World War, when most of its speakers would have been exterminated in the Holocaust. Judaeo-Occitan became extinct when its last native speaker, Armand Lunel, died in 1977. Judaeo-Italian is critically endangered, with all of its dialects except one being extinct, and that last remaining dialect Judeo-Roman being spoken by around 250 individuals in 2022. Judaeo-Spanish is spoken by the remaining Sephardic communities of the Maghreb in northern Africa, in the Middle East, especially in Turkey and Israel, which accounts for as many as 160,000 people; however, nearly all of this number speak at least one other language. While Jewish French and Jewish Latin America Spanish break the trend and are described as "Vibrant" and are facing no threat of extinction.
