= Roman Jews =

Roman Jews can refer to:

- Jews in Rome
- Jews in the Roman Empire
