= Mantuan =

Mantuan may refer to:

- Mantuan, adjective describing things of or relating to Mantua
- Mantuan dialect, one of the Eastern Lombard dialects
- Baptista Mantuanus (1447–1516), Italian Carmelite reformer, humanist and poet
