= Judeo-Italian dialects =

Italian-derived Jewish dialect continuum

Judeo-Italian
- ג׳יודו־איטאליאנו giudeo-italiano
- Pronunciation: [dʒuˌdɛoitaˈljaːno], [(ʔ)italˈkit]
- Region: Italy; Israel
- Ethnicity: Italian Jews
- Native speakers: 200 in Italy, 250 in total (2022); Very few speakers are fluent as of 2007
- Language family: Indo-European: Italic; Latino-Faliscan; Romance; Italo-Western; Judeo-Italian
- Dialects: Northern Judeo-Italian†; Tuscan Judeo-Italian†; Central Judeo-Italian
- Writing system: Hebrew alphabet 10th-18th centuries Italian Alphabet 19th century onwards

Language codes
- ISO 639-3: itk
- Glottolog: jude1255
- ELP: Judeo-Italian
- Linguasphere: & -bf 51-AAB-be & -bf

Judeo-Italian (or Judaeo-Italian, Judæo-Italian, and other names including Italkian) is a group of endangered and extinct Jewish dialects, with only about 200 speakers in Italy and 250 total speakers today. The dialects are one of the Italian languages and are a subgrouping of the Judeo-Romance Languages. Some words have Italian prefixes and suffixes added to Hebrew words as well as Aramaic roots. All of the dialects except Judeo-Roman are now extinct.

== The term Judeo-Italian ==
The glottonym giudeo-italiano is of academic and relatively late coinage. In English, the term was first used (as Judæo-Italian) by Lazaro Belleli in 1904 in the Jewish Encyclopedia, describing the languages of the Jews of Corfu. In Italian, Giuseppe Cammeo referred to a gergo giudaico-italiano ('Judaico-Italian jargon') in a 1909 article. That same year, Umberto Cassuto used the term giudeo-italiano, in the following (here translated into English):

...It is almost nothing, if you will, even compared with other Jewish dialects, Judeo-Spanish for instance, that are more or less used literally; all this is true, but from the linguistic point of view, Judeo-German is worth as much as Judeo-Italian [giudeo-italiano], to name it so, since for the glottological science the different forms of human speech are important in themselves and not by its number of speakers or the artistic forms they are used in. Moreover, a remarkable difference between Judeo-German and Judeo-Italian [giudeo-italiano], that is also valuable from the scientific point of view, is that while the former is so different from German as to constitute an independent dialect, the latter by contrast is not essentially a different thing from the language of Italy, or from the individual dialects of the different provinces of Italy

=== Other designations ===
- Historically, Italian Jews referred to their vernaculars as la`az (לעז), Hebrew for 'foreign language', 'non-Hebrew language'. And linguists use lo'ez as a description of words of Romance origin in Yiddish. (Note: La'az or lo'ez is also used for the French or other Romance words used in Rashi's Biblical and Talmudic commentaries to explain the meanings of obscure Hebrew or Aramaic words.) This may be connected with the Germanic use of the word *walhaz (literally, 'foreign') and derived cognates, for Romance peoples and languages and sometimes Celtic peoples and languages (as in English terms Walloons, Wallachians, and Welsh): the Italian and Sephardic Hebrew script for Torah scrolls is known in Yiddish as Velsh or Veilish.
- In 1587, David de Pomis used the word italiano in reference to the Italian glosses in his trilingual dictionary. The Hebrew title of the 1609 Venice Haggadah uses the word italiano or italyano (איטליאנו) for the language of Leone Modena's translation (u-fitrono bi-leshon iṭalyano, ופתרונו בלשון איטליאנו).
- Other historic descriptions are latino and volgare, both of which were commonly used in the Middle Ages to mean early Italian dialects in general, i.e. Vulgar Latin varieties.
- After the institution of the Ghetto forced Jewish communities throughout Italy into segregation, the term ghettaiolo was identified with local Jewish varieties of regional dialects.
- Another native name type is giudeesco (e.g., Judeo-Florentine iodiesco; < Latin *IUDÆĬSCU[M], or an assimilation of the hiatus /aˈe/ *giudaesco < *IUDAĬSCU[M]).
- The English neologism Italkian was coined in 1942 by Solomon Birnbaum, based on the modern Hebrew adjective ית־/אטלקי italki[t], 'Italian', from the Middle Hebrew adjective איטלקי meaning 'Italic' or 'Roman'.

=== ISO and Library of Congress classifications ===
The International Organization for Standardization language code for Judeo-Italian / Italkian in the ISO 639-3 specification is itk; the ISO 639-2 collective language code roa (for Romance languages) can also apply more generally.

"Italkian" is not used by the US Library of Congress as a subject heading, nor does it figure as a reference to Judeo-Italian. The authorized subject heading is "Judeo-Italian language".

== History ==
=== Early history ===
The first Jewish communities in Italy emerged during the 2nd century BC and were Greek speaking with knowledge of Hebrew and Aramaic. But by 1000 AD the Jewish community in Italy had abandoned Greek and adopted early forms of Italian. By the 900's AD Hebrew loanwords had begun to find their way into the speech of Italian Jews and Italian writing begins appearing in Hebrew, though the amount of Hebrew influence varies widely.

=== Later History ===
During the 16th century expulsions led to a massive decline in the amount of Judeo-Italian literature. During the 19th century Judeo-Italian had switched from using Hebrew letters to the latin alphabet. The language began to decline in the early 19th century as Italian Jews were emancipated and began to switch to standard Italian instead of Judeo-Italian. At the same time it began to be written down to preserve the language as it declines. By 1900, 30,000 people spoke the language, today it is down to 250. Around 2015 Judeo-Piedmontese went extinct. All of the dialects of Judeo-Italian except for Judeo-Roman are now extinct.

== Influence on other Jewish languages ==
According to some scholars, there are some Judeo-Italian loan words that have found their way into Yiddish. For example, the word in Judeo-Italian for 'synagogue' is scola, closely related to scuola, 'school'. The use of words for 'school' to mean 'synagogue' dates back to the Roman Empire. The Judeo-Italian distinction between scola and scuola parallels the Standard Yiddish distinction between shul/shil for 'synagogue' and shule for 'school'. Another example is Yiddish iente, from the Judeo-Italian yientile ('gentile', 'non-Jew', 'Christian'), as differentiated from the standard Italian gentile, meaning 'noble', 'gentleman' (even if the name can come from Judeo-French and French as well).

There are also several loanwords from Judeo-Italian dialects in Judeo-Gascon, due to the migration of a few Italian families to the Sephardi communities in Gascony during the 18th and 19th centuries.

== Dialects ==
Judeo-Italian regional dialects (ghettaioli, giudeeschi), these:

=== Unspecified ===
- Judeo-Ferrarese† (Giudeo-Ferrarese) in Ferrara
- Judeo-Modenese† (Giudeo-Modenese) in Modena
- Judeo-Pitigliano/ Judeo-Pitiglianese† (Giudeo-Pitigliano/ Giudeo-Pitgiliananese) in Tuscany
- Judeo-Salentinian† (Giudeo-Salentino) In Salentino
- Judeo-Resan† (Giudeo-Resab) in the region of Reggio Emilia of Emilia-Romagna
- Judeo-Torinese† (Giudeo-Torinese) in Turin
- Judeo-Italian of Lugo Di Romagna† (Giudeo-italiano di Lugo Di Romagna) in Lugo Di Romagna
- Judeo-Italian of Moncalvo† (Giudeo-italiano di Moncalvo) in Moncalvo
- Judeo-Italian of Casale Monferrato† (Giudeo-italiano di Casale Monferrato) in Casale Monferrato
- Judeo-Italian of Finale Emilia† (Giudeo-italiano di Finale Emilia) in Finale Emilia

=== Central Judeo-Italian ===
- Judeo-Roman (Giudeo-Romanesco) in Rome

=== Tuscan Judeo-Italian ===
- Bagitto/Judeo-Livornese† (Bagitto/Giudeo-Livornese) in Livorno
- Judeo-Florentine† (Giudeo-Fiorentino) in Florence

=== Northern Judeo-Italian ===
==== Venetian ====
- Judeo-Venetian† (Giudeo-Veneziano) in Venice
- Judeo-Triestine† (Giudeo-Triestino) in Trieste
- Judeo-Veronese† (Giudeo-Veronese) in Verona

==== Gallo-Italic ====
- Judeo-Reggiano† (Giudeo-Reggiano) in Reggio Emilia
- Judeo-Piedmontese† (Giudeo-Piemontese) in the region of Piedmont
- Judeo-Mantuan† (Giudeo-Mantovano) in Mantua

At least two Judeo-Italian varieties, based on the Salentino and Venetian languages, were also used in Corfu.

=== Time based divisions ===
It is also divided into two time based varieties which are Early Judeo-Italian which is attested through writings made from 1200 to 1700 and Modern Judeo-Italian attested from 1700 onwards.

== Characteristics ==
All of the spoken Judeo-Italian varieties used combination of Hebrew verb stems with Italian conjugations (e.g., אכלר akhlare, 'to eat'; גנביר gannaviare, 'to steal'; דברר dabberare, 'to speak'; לכטיר lekhtire, 'to go'). Similarly, there are abstract nouns such as טובזה tovezza, 'goodness'. This feature is unique among Jewish languages although there are arguably parallels in Jewish English dialect.

Also common are lexical incorporations from Hebrew, particularly those applicable to daily life. Terms from other Jewish languages such as Yiddish and Judeo-Spanish were also incorporated. Bagitto, spoken in Livorno, is particularly rich in loanwords from Judeo-Spanish and Judeo-Portuguese.

It was claimed by Cassuto that most Judeo-Italian dialects reflect the Italian dialect of places further to the south, due to the fact that since the expulsion of the Jews from the Kingdom of Naples, the general direction of Jewish migration in Italy had been northward.

Compared to the non Jewish languages they're related to, the Judeo-Italian languages are relatively similar to each other, with them all being mutually intelligible.

The degree of variation between Judeo-Italian dialects and their base languages (Judeo-Venetian and Venetian, Judeo-Piedmontese and Piedmontese etc.) varies. With some like Judeo-Mantuan being more divergent, others like Judeo-Venetian being less divergent and some like Judeo-Livornese being in the middle.

== Works in Judeo-Italian ==
The oldest known Judeo-Italian text is found in the margin notes of a copy of the Mishnah written between 1072 and 1073 known as "Mishnah A". One of the most accessible ways to view the Judeo-Italian language is by looking at translations of biblical texts such as the Torah and Hagiographa. For example, the Judeo-Italian language is represented in a 1716 Venetian Haggadah, a Jewish prayer book typically used during a seder, some samples of which are available online.

Today, there are two locations, the Oxford Bodleian Library, and the Jewish Theological Seminary in New York, in which many of these texts have been archived.

Some notable writers who wrote in Judeo-Italian are: Guido Bedarida who wrote in Bagitto, and Annibale Gallico who wrote in Judeo-Mantuan. A theater group named Chaimme 'a sore 'o sediaro e 'a moje (Chaim, the sister, the chairmaker and the wife) performs plays in Judeo-Roman, and Crescenzo Del Monte wrote plays in Judeo-Roman, and the play Gnora Luna in Judeo-Florentine.

== See also ==
- Italian Jews
- Judeo-Latin
- Judeo-Romance languages
- Ladino

== Bibliography ==
- Ferretti Cuomo, Luisa (1982). "Italchiano versus giudeo-italiano versus 0 (zero), una questione metodologica". Italia: Studi e ricerche sulla storia, la cultura e la letteratura degli Ebrei d'Italia (in Italian). 3 (1–2): 7–32.
- Fortis, Umberto (2006). La parlata degli ebrei di Venezia e le parlate giudeo-italiane (in Italian). Firenze: La Giuntina. ISBN 88-8057-243-1.
- Fortis, Umberto; Zolli, Paolo (1979). La parlata giudeo-veneziana. "Collana di cultura ebraica" series (in Italian). Vol. 13. Assisi/Rome: B. Carucci. ISBN 88-85027-07-5.
- Gold, David L. (1980). "The Glottonym Italkian". Italia: Studi e ricerche sulla storia, la cultura e la letteratura degli Ebrei d'Italia. 2 (1–2): 98–102.
- Jochnowitz, George (2002). "Judeo-Italian: Italian Dialect or Jewish Language?". In Pugliese, Stanisalo G. (ed.). The Most Ancient of Minorities: The Jews of Italy. Greenwood Press – via Jochnowitz.net.
- Levi, Joseph Abraham (Spring 1998). "La Ienti de Sion: Linguistic and Cultural Legacy of an Early Thirteenth-century Judeo-Italian Kinah". Italica. 75 (1): 1–21. doi:10.2307/479578. JSTOR 479578. Archived from the original on 13 November 2008 – via Orbis Latinus.
- Massariello Merzagora, Giovanna (1977). Giudeo-Italiano. "Profilo dei dialetti italiani" series. Vol. 23. Pisa: Pacini.
- Mayer Modena, Maria Luisa (1997). "Le parlate giudeo-italiane". In Vivanti, Corrado (ed.). Storia d'Italia: Gli ebrei in Italia, Vol. II: Dall'emancipazione a oggi [History of Italy: The Jews in Italy, Vol. II: From Emancipation to Today]. Turin: Einaudi. pp. 939–963.
- Mayer Modena, Maria Luisa (2022). Vena Hebraica nel Giudeo-Italiano. Dizionario dell'Elemento Ebraico negli Idiomi degli Ebrei d'Italia. Milano: LED.
