= Judismo =

Judismo may refer to at least the following two languages:

- Judeo-Arabic
- Ladino language

== See also ==
- Judaeo-Romance languages
- Jewish languages
- Judaism
