= Judaeo-Aragonese =

Extinct Romance language

- aragonit yehudit / אראגונית יהודית
- Region: Aragon
- Extinct: probably Middle Ages
- Language family: Indo-European: Italic; Latino-Faliscan; Latinic; Romance; Italo-Western; Western; (unclassified); Pyrenean–Mozarabic?; Navarro-Aragonese; Aragonese; Judaeo-Aragonese

Language codes
- ISO 639-3: None (mis)
- Glottolog: None

Judaeo-Aragonese (Aragonese: Chodigo-Aragonés) was a Judaeo-Romance language, a Jewish language that was derived from Aragonese. It was used by Spanish Jews in north-central Spain from the mid-8th century to the 1492 Alhambra Decree, which expelled Jews from Spain. Later, it either merged with the various Judaeo-Spanish dialects or fell out of use because of the far more influential Judaeo-Spanish.

While there are some scholars that believe that the language may have had some speakers until the Second World War, most scholars believe that it died out in the Middle Ages.

Along with Judaeo-Catalan, Judaeo-Aragonese shares a marked component of Judaeo-Greek. It has been suggested that Judaeo-Catalan's influence on Judaeo-Aragonese was because of the influx of Judaeo-Catalan-speakers in the 14th century, especially after the 1391 pogroms.
