= Judeo-Mantuan =

Dialect of the Judeo-Italian languages based on the Mantuan dialect of Emilian

- Native to: Italy
- Region: Mantua
- Ethnicity: Mantuan Jews
- Extinct: 20th century
- Language family: Indo-European: Italic; Latino-Faliscan; Latin; Romance; Italo-Western; Western Romance; Gallo-Romance; Gallo-Italic; Emilian–Romagnol; Emilian; Mantuan; Judeo-Mantuan
- Writing system: Latin

Language codes
- ISO 639-3: None (mis)
- Glottolog: None

Judeo-Mantuan is a dialect of the Judeo-Italian languages based on the Mantuan of Emilian. Judeo-Mantuan like all dialects of Judeo-Italian besides Judeo-Roman is now extinct. It was spoken in and around the city of Mantua.

== History ==
The Jewish community of Mantua dates from the 12th century. By 1610 3,000 or 15% of Mantua's population was Jewish and there was a large population of Jewish bankers in the city. It was the only sizeable Jewish community in Lombardy until the 19th century. It would maintain its relevance taking part in every part of the city's society. It would be home to one of two Hebrew printers in Italy the other being in Venice. The community would be emancipated in 1866.

The earliest Mantuan texts which show some of the features of Judeo-Mantuan are from 1200.

The community would begin to decline during the 1860s as wealthy members began to move en masse to richer and better connected Milan. In 1876, Annibale Gallico the most important source of Judeo-Mantuan literature would be born. Mantua and its Jewish community would half in population by 1910, and by 1930, the community was down to only 500 members. The community would be damaged during the Holocaust and today only numbers around 100 individuals.

In 2004, the poems of Annibale Gallico would be published.

== Media ==
Several poems would be written in Judeo-Mantuan by a Mantuan Jewish doctor named Annibale Gallico (1876-1935). And texts dating from 1200 to 1700 in Mantuan that show several of the changed between Judeo-Mantuan and Mantuan.

There are also writings by Mayer Modena and Massariello Merzagora.

== Characteristics ==
Unlike in Italian where the plural definite article is i, in Judeo-Mantuan it is li.

The U in Hebrew words like Morenu (Our teacher) is replaced with a O (Moreno).

Judeo-Mantuan has several archaic traits that were lost in regular Mantuan. The main archaic traits are the lack of the high and low front rounded vowels ü and ö.

Other features include:

- Fricativization of the Occlusive p
- Absence of Rounded Vowels
- The presence of anaptyctic vowels
- Compared to Judeo-Livornese and Judeo-Venetian, Judeo-Mantuan contain the highest degree of distinctiveness from the language it's based on.

== Sample text ==
Judeo-Mantuan	English
Non ghe meti sal nè péver, la contava Scarponsel: Una volta Prosper Rever è andá a scόla a far gomèl. El moreno ghe demanda che maccá gh'era succès. Lu s'el tira de una banda e ghe dis col cόr sospés: "M'è cascá dal davansal la camisa de percal: E se denter ghe fuss stá?" "Ma che vaga in chelalá!"	I'll add neither salt nor pepper to what I heard from Scarponsel: One time Prosper Rever went to shul to make gomèl. And when the rabbi asked him what misfortune he had fled, he took him to one side and with a beating heart he said: "My gingham shirt fell to the ground from the windowsill. What if I'd been in it?" Said the rabbi, "You'd be dead!"
