= Italian Hebrew =

Pronunciation system for Hebrew used by Italian Jews

- Region: Italy, Europe
- Language family: Afro-Asiatic: Italian Hebrew

Language codes
- ISO 639-3: None (mis)
- Glottolog: jude1264

Italian Hebrew or Italki Hebrew refers to the pronunciation system for liturgical Hebrew traditionally used by Italian Jews. Italian Hebrew are mainly used in religious, literary and academic contexts. They are formed by regional dialects, interactions with local Italian dialects and evolving grammatical conventions.

This article covers the following aspects of Italian Hebrew: features, the differences in pronunciation between the east and west, morphological changes, NP-strategy, the gradual rise of Europe, religious uses, the rise and status of Renaissance studies.

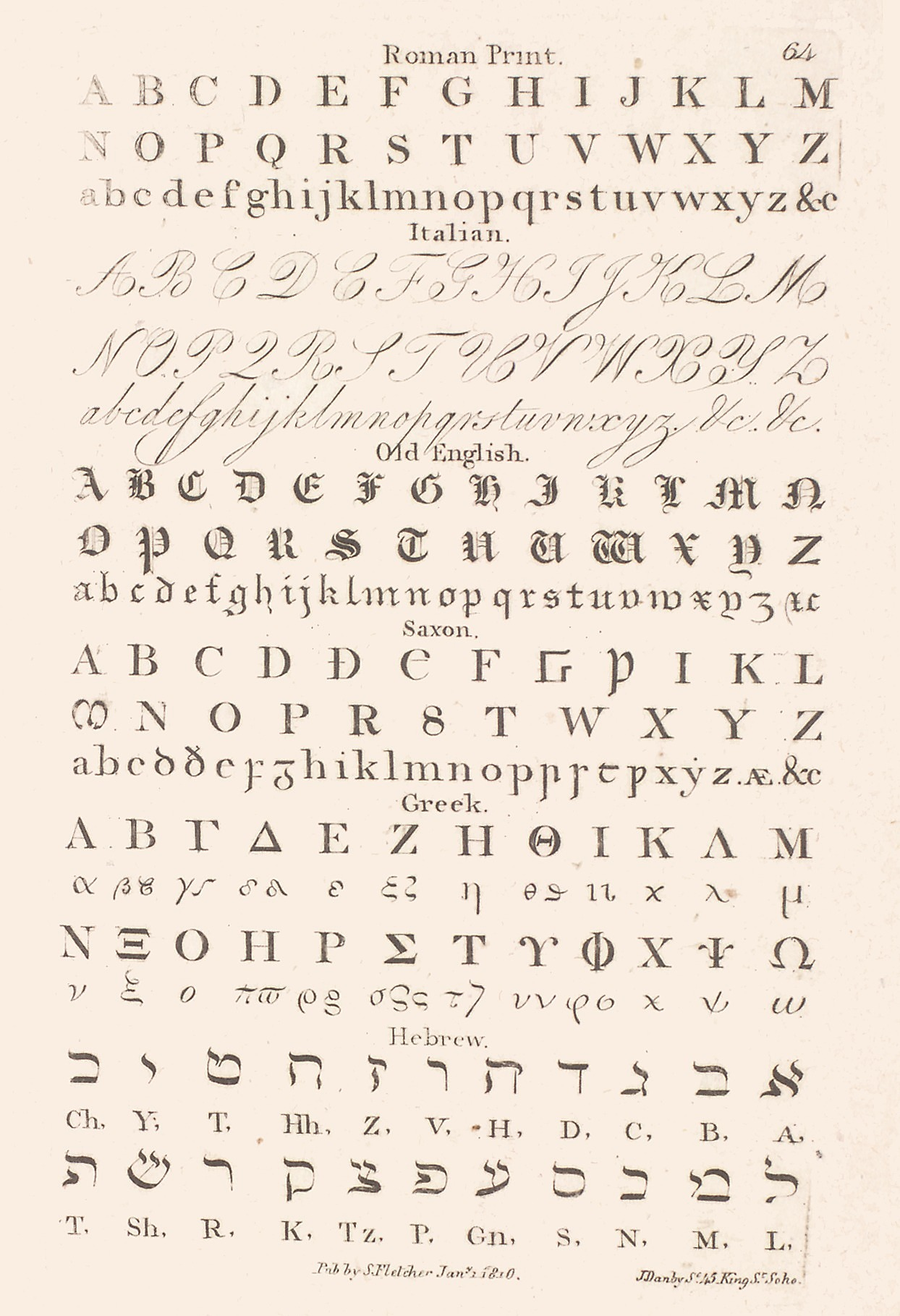
Alphabets: Roman, Italian, Old English, Saxon, Greek, Hebrew

== Features ==
The Italian pronunciation of Hebrew is similar to that of conservative Spanish and Portuguese Jews. Distinguishing features are:

- beth rafe is pronounced [v];
- he is often silent, as in the family name "Coen";
- vav is normally [v] as in most Hebrew dialects, but can become [w] in diphthongs (as in the family name "Anau"). Thus, in construct masculine plurals with male singular possessive suffix יו-, the pronunciation is not [-av] but [-au];
- zayin is often pronounced [dz] like Italian voiced "z";
- ayin is pronounced [ŋ] (like English "ng" in "sing"). In some dialects, like the Roman, this sometimes becomes [ɲ], like the Italian combination "gn";
- tav rafe is pronounced [d];
- speakers in communities south of the La Spezia–Rimini Line, and communities transplanted north of this, pronounce dagesh forte as a true geminate sound, in keeping with the pronunciation of double letters in Italian.

This pronunciation has in many cases been adopted by the Sephardi, Ashkenazi and Appam communities of Italy as well as by the Italian rite communities.

== Dialectal differences in Hebrew pronunciation ==
In the context of modern Hebrew, there are two main dialects: Eastern and non-Eastern. The two dialects show significant differences in the use of consonants. Eastern dialects retain some of the pronunciation features of ancient Hebrew, such as the guttural stop /h/. This makes the pronunciation shorter, and Eastern dialect speakers, especially in religious ceremonies, intentionally pronounce certain consonants, such as /s/, /t/, /l/, in guttural forms that non-Eastern dialects do not have.

At the same time, the pronunciation of non-Eastern dialects is more modern, with European influences. For example, the auxiliary middle vowel /e/ in non-Eastern dialects is sometimes changed to [ei], while Eastern dialect speakers tend to retain the monophonic [e] sound. Eastern dialect speakers are more conservative in their use of consonant junctions than non-Eastern dialect speakers, especially in cautious and slow speech. In addition, /r/ in Eastern dialects is usually pronounced as a gingival trill [r], while /r/ in non-Eastern dialects is usually pronounced as a uvula [R].

The pronunciation of Hebrew is markedly different from English, especially in the use of vowels and consonants. Hebrew has only five basic vowel phonemes /i/, /e/, /a/, /o/, /u/ and no vowel harmony. Some consonants in Hebrew, such as /x/ and uvula /r/, are not found in English and are pronounced in a position and manner that is markedly different from their English equivalents. Although Hebrew has fewer vowels than English, the pronunciation of certain vowels is slightly but significantly different from that of English vowels.

== Grammatical Structures and Morphological Change ==
Compared to languages such as Spanish and French, Hebrew nouns have relatively complex morphological changes, requiring distinction between gender, number and case, etc., while verbs need to agree with the subject in number, gender, person and tense. This makes verbs more complex than nouns. Many morphological change rules lack obvious phonetic cues, and the pronunciation of affixes depends on the root of the word that follows them.

Modern Hebrew usually follows the SVO word order, and it is also found that the VSO word order, nouns usually appear at the end of the sentence, they are more easily highlighted by the pronunciation and intonation, but because of the SVO word order, verbs usually appear after nouns, which can cause them to be more easily ignored in the sentence.

== Noun Phrase Constructions and Reciprocity ==
In Hebrew grammar, noun phrases (NP) have various structural forms, among which the most common ones are the unitary structure and the binary structure. These two structures are not only different in form, but also have their own characteristics in historical evolution and functions.

Two-unit constructions consists of two elements. This structure may stem from two different language phenomena: one is the repetitive expression of nouns or pronouns, and the other is the repetition of measure words or participles.

In the grammatical structure of early Hebrew, the use of the two-unit constructions is more common, it is composed of two separate parts, each of which plays a different syntactic role in the predicate. For example, the Hebrew expression "man- his brother" or "man - his companion" shows the classical use of this two-unit constructions, where the two parts each act as subject and object. In modern Hebrew usage, one-unit constructions becomes more common, consisting of a one unit (anaphor) and referred to jointly with another compound noun phrase (NP) in the sentence. Although this structure does not act as the subject of a non-clause, it can fill any other syntactic position required by the predicate. For example, the Hebrew word for "mutual" is a one-unit anaphor.

The transformation from the binary structure to the unit structure involves the adjustment of speech and the change of the grammatical relationship framework among the constituent elements. The main driving force for this transformation comes from the reanalysis of the left edge of the sentence (that is, the subject defined by the clause). This kind of change may lead to a series of morphological changes, including fusion, deletion, solidification, consistency and lattice changes. There are various noun phrase (NP) construction strategies in Hebrew, showing diversity in form and function. This consistency may be influenced by multiple factors such as language history, functional distribution, and sociolinguistics.

The shift from two-unit to one-unit constructions reflects not only the evolution of the language itself, but also changes in the ways of thinking and communication habits of the social groups that use the language.

== The Rise of Hebrew in Europe ==
Since the 9th century, the use of Hebrew has gradually emerged in Europe. Evidence of academic research using Hebrew has emerged, such as the Spanish Jewish poets Samur bin Nagra and Solomon ibn Gabbirol, as well as the Jewish scholar Sabatai Donolo from southern Italy, etc. More Jewish inscriptions in Hebrew also emerged in southern Italy, indicating that Hebrew began to be used in religious ceremonies. During this period, literary works created in Hebrew began to emerge, such as poetry and biblical commentaries.

The use of Hebrew in Europe reached its peak in the 10th century and beyond. Hebrew holds a dominant position in the academic research and religious ceremonies of the Jews and has become one of the main languages of the European Jewish community. The educational system of the Jews also began to be based on the Hebrew language, such as writing Greek and other languages in the Hebrew alphabet.

== Influence of Hebrew words in medieval and Renaissance Italian Jewish prayer book translations ==
The Hebrew language is divided into three historical periods:

- Biblical Hebrew: used from about 1000 to 200 BC, it is the written language of the Hebrew Bible (Old Testament).
- Mishnaic Hebrew: Used from about 200 BC to 700 ADS, it is the written language of the Mishna (Jewish Torah).
- Modern Hebrew: The official language of Israel since the late 19th century, derived from the Mishnahi language.

Hebrew is widely used in Jewish life as a symbol of national identity, differentiating Jewish prayer from Christian worship, and conveying an atmosphere of holiness and mystery. As the core medium of Judaism, Hebrew presents a unique grammatical system and morphological complexity in religious texts because of its sacredness.

The translation of the prayer book does not only convey the semantic content of the original Hebrew, but also conveys additional meanings, such as emphasizing the formulaic structure of the prayer, highlighting the importance of the Hebrew language, and expressing respect for ancient traditions. Different translation choices will convey different meanings. Some prayer books use Old English translations to emphasize respect for ancient traditions. Some translations focus on expressing concern for the prayer community, while others focus on God. In addition, there are some translators who use unique linguistic constructs to explain their unique views on blessing.

Hebrew is closely associated with the religious texts and writings of Judaism and is considered a sacred language. This language is not only a tool of daily communication, but also a key element of Jewish identity and cultural inheritance. During the Middle Ages, Jewish civilization experienced a cultural Renaissance, resulting in a significant increase in the acquisition and use of Hebrew. Many Jewish scholars and translators devoted themselves to translating Greek philosophical, scientific, and literary works into Hebrew, thus making the classical wisdom widely disseminated and advanced.

In prayer books, foreign words from the Hebrew language are widely used, and various prayer books show the understanding of Hebrew pronunciation by different communities. Reform prayer books in North America tended to adopt modern Israeli Hebrew pronunciation habits, while Orthodox prayer books in England preferred Ashkenazi pronunciation. Different Jewish groups have different perceptions and preferences for Hebrew pronunciation. Many words with explicit religious meanings were retained in the translation, which may be related to the function of the prayer book as a prayer text, and the translators wanted to keep the blessing as close as possible to the original text. This reservation is not only in the words themselves, but also in the pronunciation and spelling of the words.

== The study of Hebrew in Italy during the 15th and 16th centuries ==
The 15th-century Hebrew-Arab-Italian dictionary "Maqre Dardəqe" included Hebrew roots and their corresponding Italian and Arabic interpretations, reflecting the influence of Hebrew on early Italian Jewish literature. Furthermore, some early documents, such as Parma's famous manuscript of Mishnah, also contain a large number of Hebrew annotations, further demonstrating the infiltration of Hebrew into the early Italian Jewish literature.

Similar to the Latin and Greek Renaissances, the study of Hebrew in Italy during the 16th century can be considered a form of "Hebrew Renaissance." It was awakened from its original state of silence and began to receive academic and cultural attention. Due to its historical and cultural background, Italy has become an important center for Hebrew studies.

At the end of the 15th century, the Hebrew printing industry gradually developed. Jewish and Christian printers published a variety of Hebrew documents, such as the Bible, prayer books, codes and rabbinic essays, providing scholars with abundant educational resources. Around 1480, Hebrew manuscripts were expensive and hard to obtain. In the following decades, mainly in Italian cities, Jewish and Christian printers began to supply Epistle to the Hebrews and Bible texts to the European market.

== Influence of Hebrew on Italian Jewish ==
Literary Italian-Jewish refers to Italian texts written in the Hebrew alphabet, spanning approximately 1200 to 1700 years, including translations and original works. The number of literary works in Italian Jewish is much greater than that in other Judeo-Romance dialects, except for Judeot (Ladino). Apart from its unique writing system, Literary Italian Jewish can be regarded as a variant of Literary Italian in most cases, but its uniqueness lies in the incorporation of a small number of Hebrew words.

== Importance of Hebrew in Italian Jewish encyclopedias ==
Hebrew, as an important carrier of Jewish culture, has long carried and passed on the thoughts and traditions of the Jewish nation. During the Renaissance, Hebrew became the core language of Jewish academic and cultural expression. The Hebrew encyclopedias of this period often revoled around the image of King Solomon, endowing it with symbolic meanings of mysticism and metaphysics. King Solomon was shaped as an ideal model of philosopher and ruler, and his wisdom and contributions to science were regarded as key elements in the Jewish cultural system.

Facing the impact of the anti-Reformation and anti-Semitism during the Renaissance, the channels for the expression and dissemination of Jewish intellectuals were restricted. Against this background, Hebrew has become a knowledge tool that can circumvent external censorship and circulate within the Jewish community.
