= 1609 Venice Haggadah =

Illustrated Jewish Passover service book

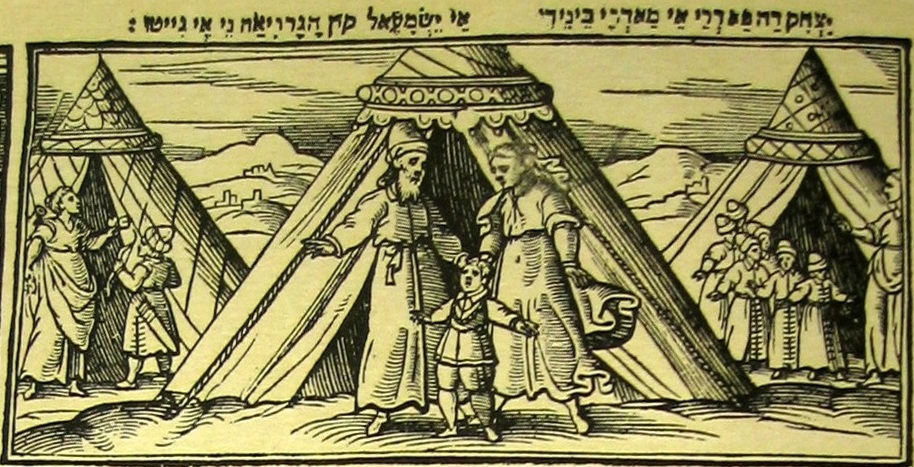
A portion of a page from the Venice Haggadah of 1609, displaying the three wives of Abraham and his sons.

The 1609 Venice Haggadah contains the text of the Passover Haggadah which accompanies the Passover Seder. The haggadah was created by Israel ha-Zifroni of Guastalla. The Haggadah appeared with translations into Judeo-Italian, Judaeo-Spanish (Ladino), and Judeo-German (Yiddish).

The New Venice Haggadah of 1609 was republished to mark the 500th anniversary of the imposition of the Venetian Ghetto. The new haggadah was published by Damocle Edizioni and printed in Venice.
