= History of the Jews in Rome =

The Jewish community in Rome is one of the oldest in Europe, with its origins tracing back to at least 161 BCE.

== Antiquity ==
The period from 161 BCE marks the arrival of Jason ben Eleazar and Eupolemus ben Yochanan, who came as emissaries of the Maccabees to form an alliance with Rome against the Seleucid Greeks. The initial Jewish settlers in Rome were primarily diplomats and community leaders who moved to the city to maintain and strengthen the newly formed alliance. Over time, these early settlers established a small but significant Jewish community. Under the early Roman emperors, the Jewish community in Rome experienced a relatively tolerant environment. Julius Caesar granted several privileges to the Jewish population, allowing them to own property, administer their community affairs, and exempting them from military service due to their religious obligations.

In the 40s CE, Philo, a Jewish philosopher from Alexandria who visited the court of Emperor Caligula in Rome, wrote that the Jewish community on the Transtiberine side of the city descended from captives who had gained their freedom without being forced to abandon their identity.

As a result of the First Jewish–Roman War (66–73 CE), Rome experienced a significant influx of enslaved Jewish captives.

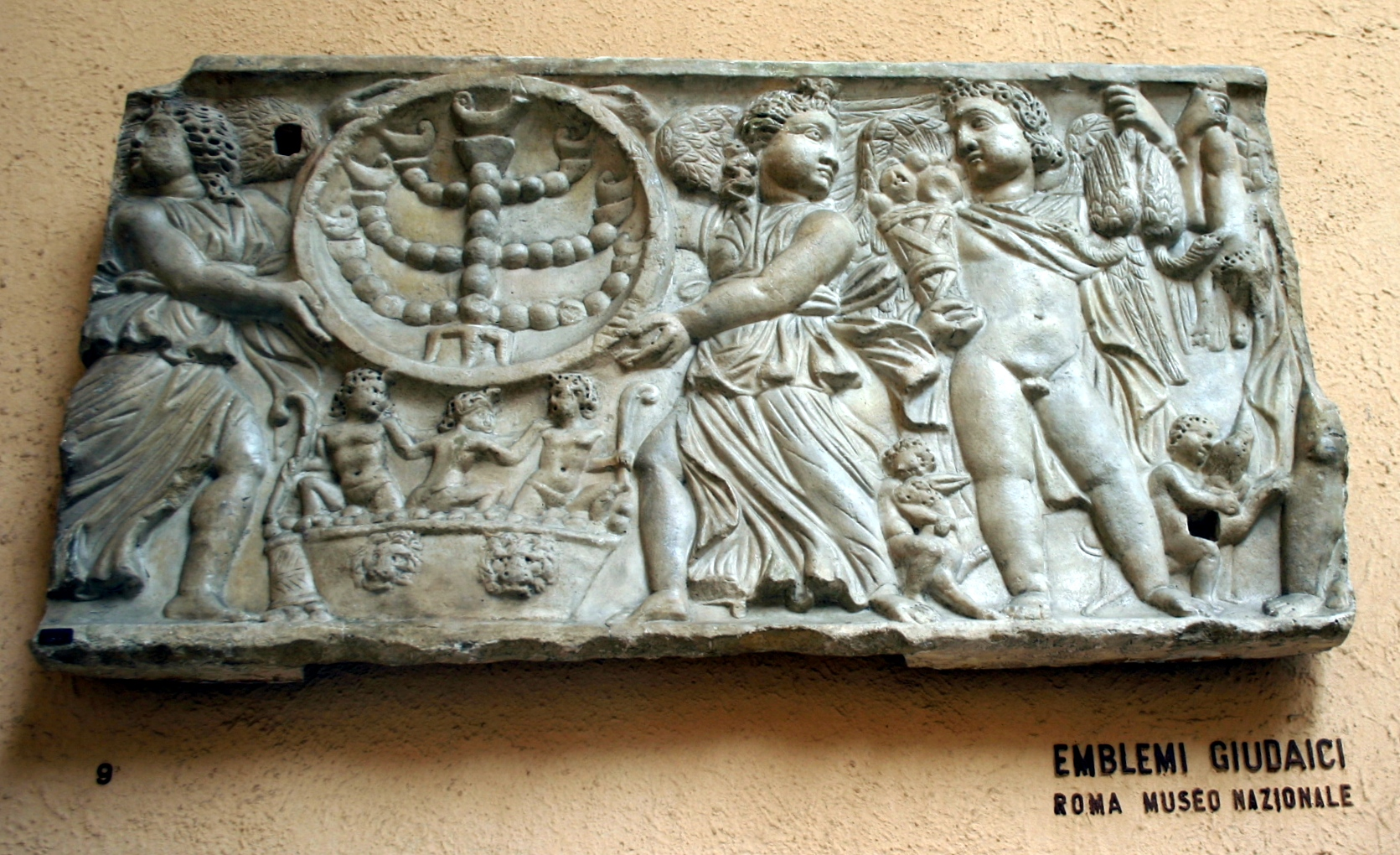
A pair of putti bearing a menorah, on a cast of a 2nd- or 3rd-century relief (original in the National Museum of Rome)

Between the 2nd and 4th centuries CE, funerary inscriptions along Rome's main thoroughfares provide evidence of Jewish religious life. Epitaphs discovered along the Appian Way, south of Rome, feature honorific titles that center on Torah observance. The interred were commemorated as philonomos (lover of the Law), nomomathes (student of the Law), nomodidaskolos (teacher of the Law), philentolos (lover of the Commandments), and philolaos (lover of the people). One unnamed epitaph features the formula from Proverbs, "the memory of the righteous is a blessing." while multiple inscriptions close with the phrase "sleeps in peace with the righteous," suggesting a belief that a life of Torah observance leads to a blessed afterlife. From the Via Portuensis, an early 2nd century Latin plaque commemorates a woman named Regina as "obedient to the Law," and a bilingual Latin and Greek epitaph records a woman named Victorina, described as righteous, holy, and a lover of the commandments; her stone is adorned with a menorah, etrog and shofar. A sarcophagus from the Via Nomentana records that Julia Irene Arista was a woman "filled with the virtue of God and the faith of the chosen people, who observed the Laws exactly."

== Late Antiquity ==
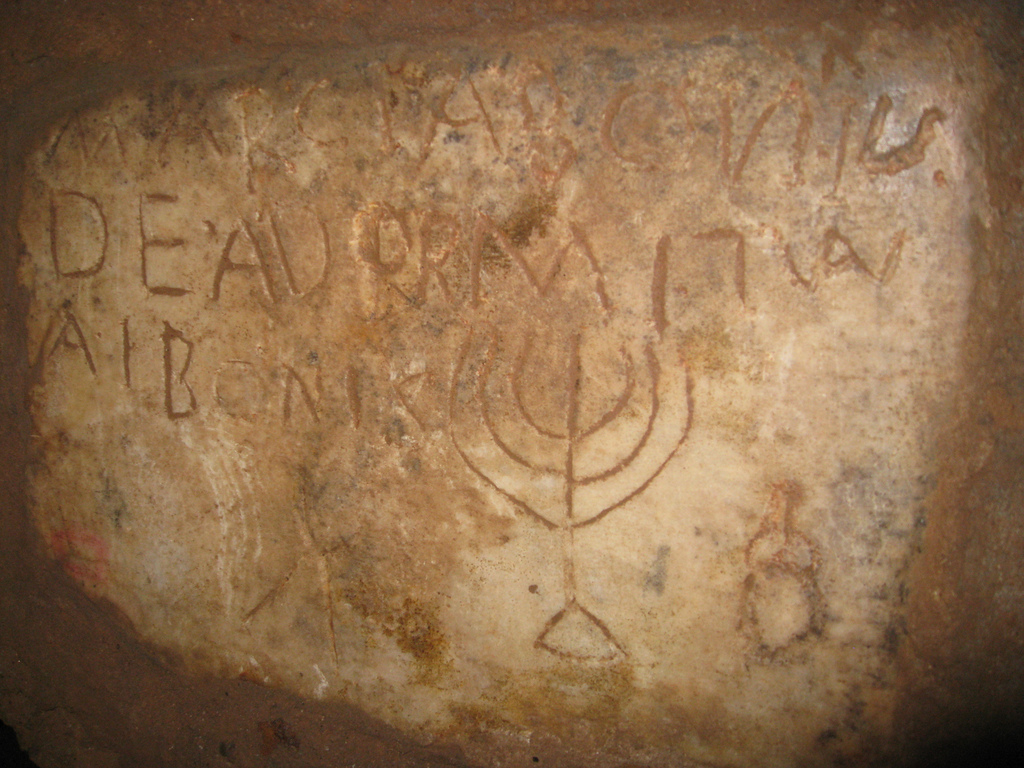
Menorah motif, the Jewish catacombs of Vigna Randanini (2nd–5th centuries CE)

With the Christianization of the Roman Empire under Emperor Constantine in 312 CE, the status of Jews in Rome began to change. In Late Antiquity, Rome was home not only to Jews but also to a Samaritan community. A Samaritan synagogue is mentioned in a letter of Theoderic the Great, the Ostrogothic king of Italy, dated between 507 and 511 CE and preserved in Cassiodorus' Variae. In the document, Theoderic rebukes the Samaritans for claiming that a church had once been their synagogue.

== Middle Ages ==
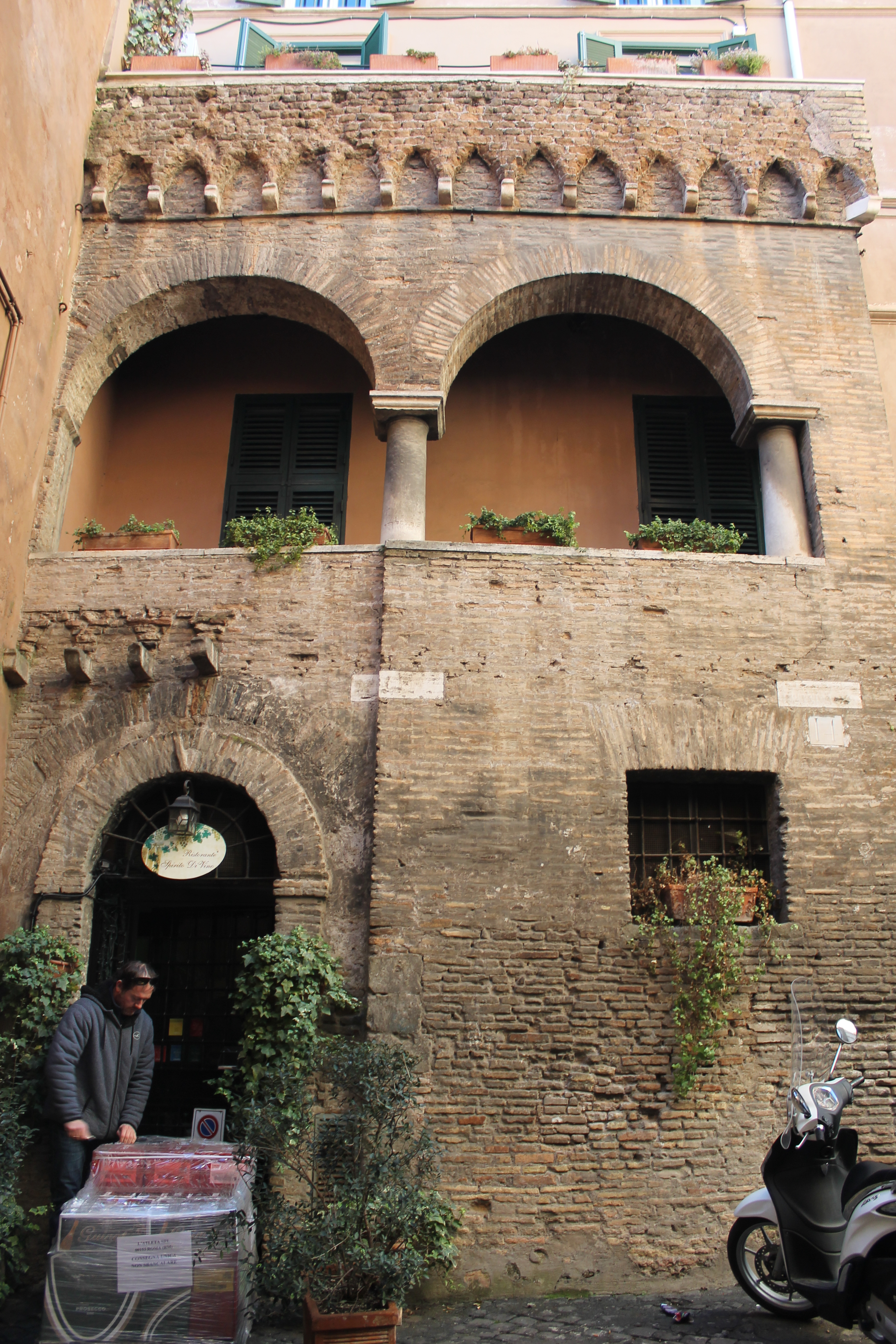
Remnants of the Rabbi Nathan ben Jehiel Synagogue at Vicolo dell'Atleta in Trastevere

The distinctive nature of the Jewish community in Rome as the capital of Western Christianity set it apart from other Jewish communities. Except for the time of antipope Anacletus II, Jews and Christians co-existed peacefully in Rome and suffered little from the discrimination Jews faced in other parts of Europe. They had always enjoyed a direct line of communication with the popes and were since the sixth century influential enough to seek papal intervention when needed. Due to this status, they were occasionally also asked for guidance and assistance by other Jewish communities in Europe and there are a number of cases in which popes intervened on behalf of the Jews of Rome. Particularly important in this regard was the influential Pierleoni family, who, though they converted eventually to Christianity, often interceded with the papacy on behalf of European Jewish communities and in return often provided the popes with both financial support and physical protection. Since the twelfth century, it became custom that representatives of the Jewish community of Rome would display the newly elected pope a torah during the papal adventus, with Boniface VIII being the last pope before the Avignon Papacy.

The Jewish community in Rome produced several notable scholars during the Middle Ages. Among them was Rabbi Nathan ben Jehiel, who authored the Arukh, an essential Talmudic dictionary. He is also credited with founding a synagogue in 1101, the remnants of which can still be seen today at Vicolo dell'Atleta in Trastevere. Another synagogue, once located near the church of San Tommaso in the 14th century, no longer exists.

The late medieval period saw significant changes in the composition of the Jewish community in Rome. The expulsion of Jews from Spain in 1492 and Portugal in 1497 led to an influx of Jewish refugees into Rome. Throughout the Middle Ages, the Papal States were one of the few areas of medieval Europe from which Jews were never expelled.

== Early Modern ==
=== Renaissance period ===
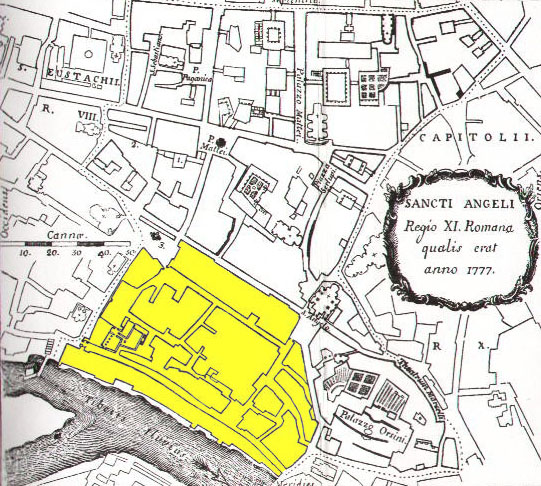
Map of Rome showing the Ghetto in yellow

The Renaissance period, spanning from the 14th to the 17th century, was a time of significant cultural, artistic, and intellectual revival in Europe. For the Jewish community in Rome, this era was marked by both opportunities for cultural contributions and episodes of severe persecution. Following the expulsion of the Jews from Spain, pope Alexander VI allowed those refugees that came to Italy to settle in Rome against the resistance of the local Roman Jews as well as against exhortation by king Ferdinand II of Aragon who tried to influence Alexander VI to also expel the Jewish population of Rome. Thereafter, additionally to the half-dozen already existing old Italian congregations and those formed by immigrants from France and Germany, synagogues following the Castilian, Catalan, the Aragonese and Sicilian rites were established. Pope Leo X (pontificate from 1513 to 1521) was very favourable to the Jews of Rome and to Jews in Christianity in general. Leo X was interested in Jewish learning, had Jewish musicians and physicians among his court and authorised in 1518 both the establishment of a Hebrew printing office in Rome as well as a special privilege for the issuance of a new edition of the Talmud.

Despite their contributions, the Jewish community faced significant persecution during the Renaissance, especially during the time of the Reformation and Counter-Reformation which led to increased antisemitism and restrictive measures against Jews. In 1554, after a child was found crucified in the Teutonic cemetery, the local population accused the Jews of ritual murder, but the Church did not believe these accusations and proceeded to find the real murderer. Despite the harsh conditions, the Jewish community in the Ghetto maintained a vibrant intellectual and religious life.

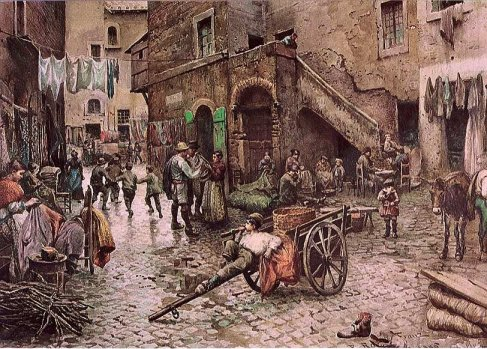
Street scene from the Roman Ghetto, painting by Ettore Roesler Franz (circa 1880)

In 1555, the bull Cum nimis absurdum by Pope Paul IV established the Roman Ghetto, which was one of the longest lasting ghettos. The Ghetto was located in the Rione Sant'Angelo district, an area prone to frequent flooding from the River Tiber. Life in the Ghetto was marked by severe restrictions and discrimination. Jews were stripped of many of their rights and were subjected to various forms of humiliation and control. Despite the oppressive conditions, the Jewish community in the Ghetto maintained a rich social and cultural life. After the Church closed the Jewish banks in 1682, the condition of the Ghetto deteriorated. The community developed its own dialect, known as Giudeo-Romanesco, and continued to observe religious practices and traditions.

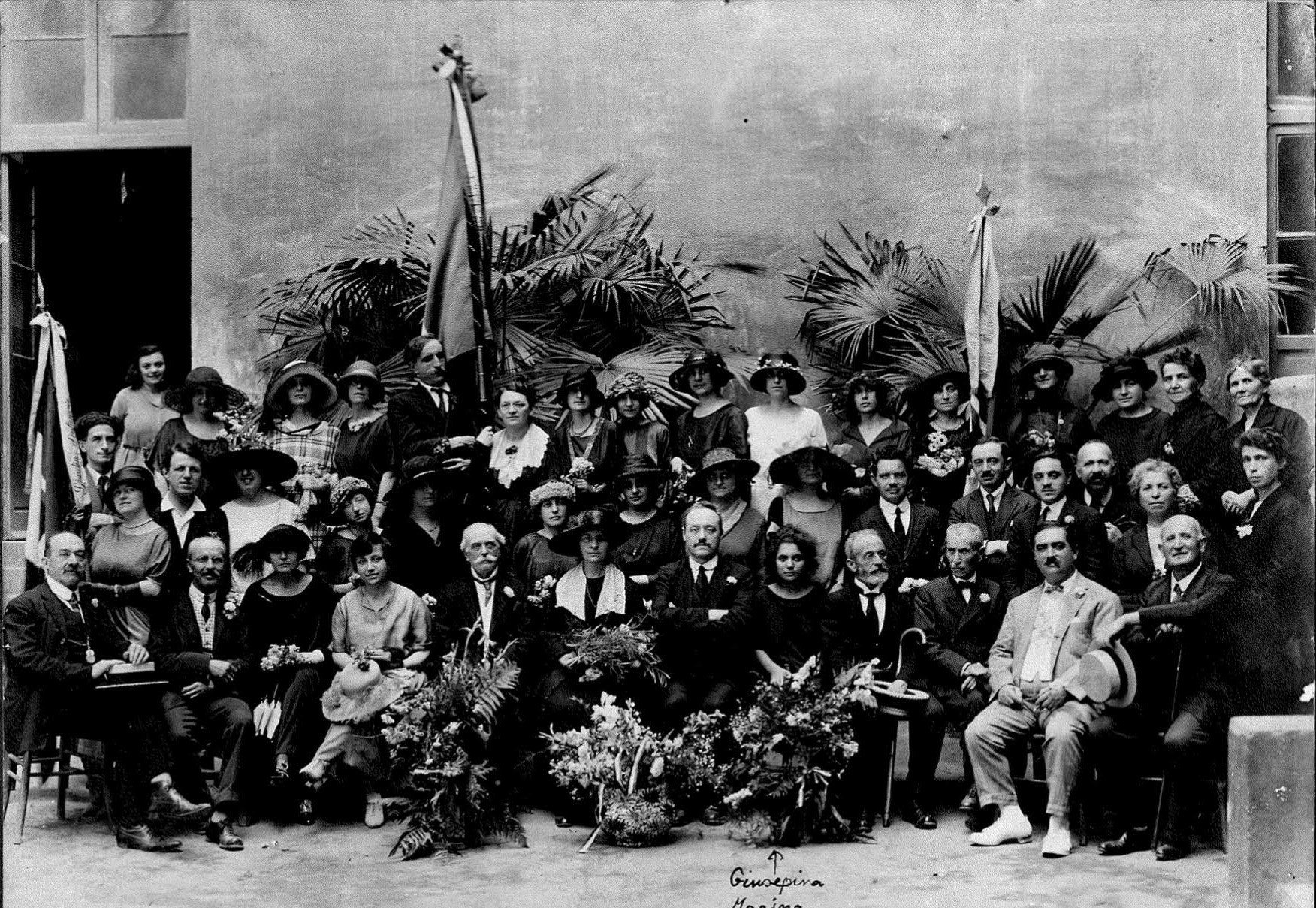
Staff of the Jewish school in Rome, Vittorio Polako, photo taken between 1924 and 1929

=== 19th century ===
The emancipation of the Jewish community in Rome marked a significant turning point in their history, transitioning from centuries of segregation and discrimination to a period of increased integration and participation in broader Italian society. The process of Jewish emancipation in Rome began in earnest during the period of the Italian Risorgimento, the movement for Italian unification. A pivotal moment in the emancipation of Roman Jews occurred on 20 September 1870, with the breach of Porta Pia and the capture of Rome by the forces of the Kingdom of Italy. Following the breach of Porta Pia, the walls of the Roman Ghetto were torn down, and Jews were granted the same civil rights as other citizens. The post-war period saw the Jewish community in Rome flourish in various fields. Jewish individuals became prominent in the arts, sciences, and academia.

== 20th century ==
The period of World War II and the Holocaust was a time of immense suffering and tragedy for the Jewish community in Rome. The Nazi occupation of Rome and the implementation of the "Final Solution" had devastating effects on the Jewish population, leading to widespread persecution, deportation, and murder. In early September 1943, following the armistice between Italy and the Allied forces, German troops occupied northern and central Italy, including Rome. Despite the payment of the ransom, the Germans proceeded with their plans to deport the Jews of Rome. On 16 October 1943, the SS conducted a massive raid on the Roman Ghetto, seizing Jews from their homes and taking them to a military college in the center of the city. Over the following days, more than 1,000 Jews were deported Auschwitz-Birkenau. The German occupation of Rome lasted for nine months. During this period, approximately 1,800 Jews were deported, but over 10,000 Jews survived, largely due to the efforts of those who hid them and the lack of cooperation from the Italian police. The terror of the Roman Ghetto was Celeste Di Porto (Rome, 29 July 1925 – Rome, 13 March 1981), who, despite being Jewish herself, collaborated with the occupying forces. Among those she betrayed to the Germans was Roman Jewish boxer Lazzaro Anticoli, known as Bucefalo, who was killed in the Fosse Ardeatine massacre. After the war she served 7 years of a 12-year sentence for collaboration.

The post-war period for the Jewish community in Rome was marked by efforts to rebuild and recover from the devastation of World War II and the Holocaust. This era saw significant challenges, including the restitution of property, the preservation of cultural heritage, and the re-establishment of community life. The Jewish community in Rome faced the daunting task of rebuilding their lives and institutions. Many survivors returned to find their homes and businesses destroyed or confiscated. One of the significant challenges in the post-war period was the restitution of property confiscated by the Nazis and Italian Fascists. The preservation of cultural heritage was another critical issue for the Jewish community in Rome. The Jewish community in Rome is a vibrant and active part of the city's cultural and social fabric. With a history that spans over two millennia, the Jewish population in Rome has managed to preserve its rich heritage while adapting to modern times.

== Contemporary ==
=== Demographics and distribution ===
As of the latest estimates, the Jewish population in Rome numbers around 15,000. While historically concentrated in the Roman Ghetto, most Roman Jews now live in various neighborhoods across the city. Prominent areas with significant Jewish populations include Marconi, Monteverde, Parioli, and the neighborhood around Piazza Bologna and Viale Libia, where many Libyan Jews settled after immigrating to Rome.

=== Religious and cultural institutions ===
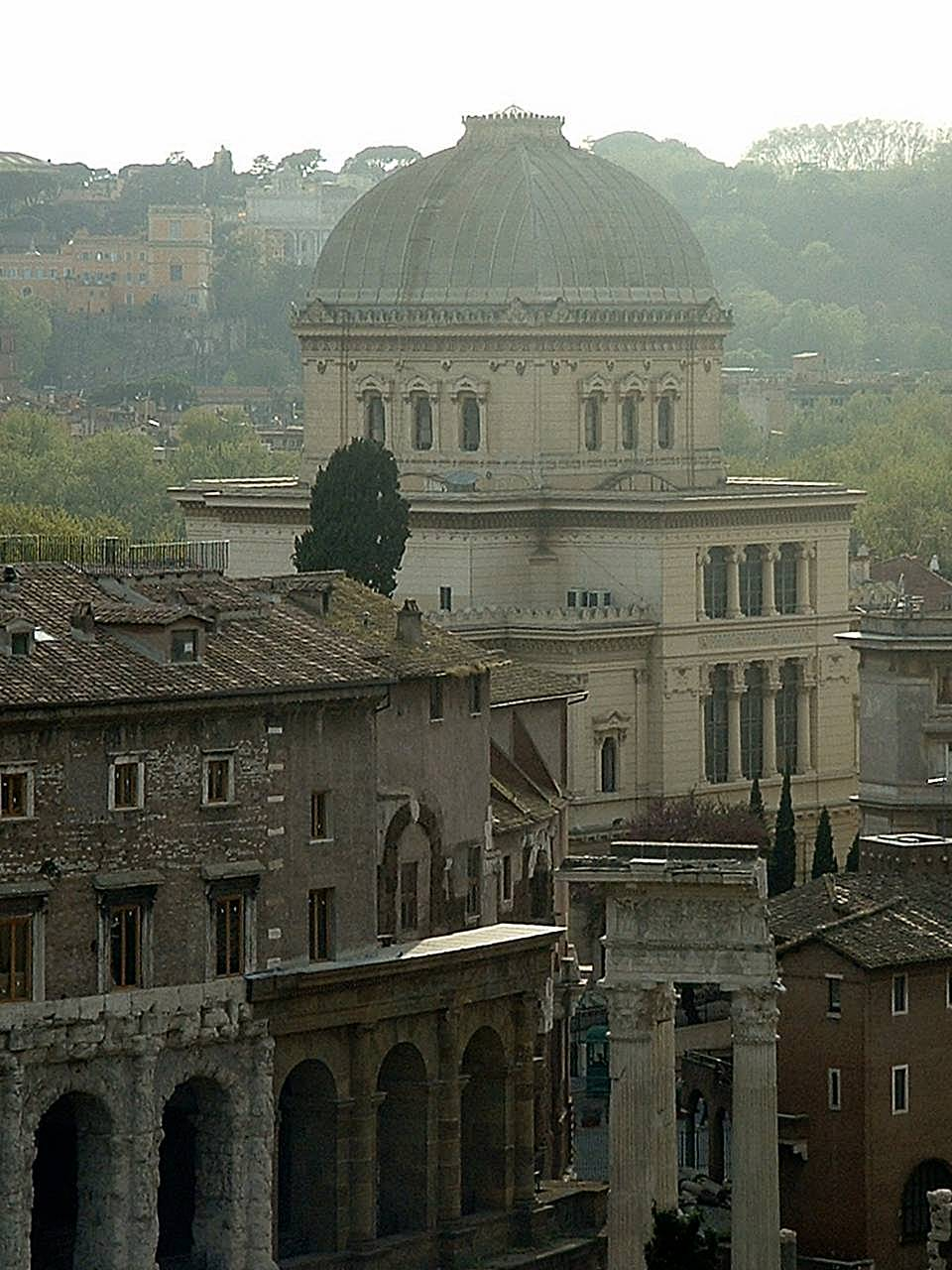
The Great Synagogue of Rome

The Great Synagogue of Rome, completed in 1904, remains the central place of worship and a symbol of the community's enduring presence. In addition to the Great Synagogue, there are several smaller synagogues scattered throughout the city, catering to the diverse needs of the Jewish population. These include both Sephardic and Ashkenazic congregations, reflecting the community's varied heritage.

The Jewish community operates a day school located in the former Ghetto area, which provides education from kindergarten through high school. The school emphasizes both secular and Jewish studies, ensuring that students receive a well-rounded education that includes a strong foundation in Jewish traditions and values.

=== Community organizations and activities ===
Numerous organizations and institutions serve the Jewish community in Rome, offering a wide range of social, cultural, and religious activities. The Union of Italian Jewish Communities (UCEI) plays a central role in coordinating activities and representing the interests of Jews in Italy. Chabad of Rome, established in 1976, provides religious services, educational programs, and social support to both local Jews and visitors.

One of the most popular community events organized by Chabad is the public Menorah lighting in Piazza Barberini during Chanukah. This event draws hundreds of participants, including community leaders and dignitaries, and has become a symbol of Jewish pride and resilience.

=== Cultural contributions ===
The Jewish community in Rome has made significant contributions to the city's cultural life. Jewish cuisine, particularly dishes such as carciofi alla giudia (Jewish-style artichokes) and cassola (a type of cheesecake), is known and consumed by both Jews and non-Jews. Kosher restaurants and bakeries are found throughout the city, offering a taste of traditional Jewish culinary heritage.

The community also maintains a rich tradition of music and the arts. The Judeo-Roman dialect, Giudaico-Romanesco, which incorporates elements of Hebrew and Italian, is a unique linguistic heritage that continues to be studied and preserved.

=== Challenges and antisemitism ===
Contemporary Roman Jews still face challenges, including instances of antisemitism. The community works to combat antisemitism through education, advocacy, and collaboration with broader Italian society. Efforts to preserve the memory of the Holocaust and educate future generations about its atrocities are central to these initiatives.

=== Integration and identity ===
The Jewish community in Rome has integrated into broader Italian society while maintaining a distinct cultural and religious identity. This balance is reflected in the active participation of Jews in various professional fields, including academia, business, and the arts. The community's ability to adapt and thrive in a modern, secular society while preserving its traditions is a testament to its resilience and vitality.

=== Future prospects ===
Looking ahead, the Jewish community in Rome continues to focus on preserving its heritage, supporting its members, and contributing to the broader society. Plans for the construction of a new Shoah Museum in Rome, although delayed, underscore the community's commitment to remembrance and education. The ongoing efforts to recover and preserve cultural artifacts lost during the Holocaust also highlight the importance of cultural preservation.

In conclusion, the contemporary Jewish community in Rome is a dynamic and integral part of the city's mosaic. With a rich history and a strong sense of identity, the community continues to thrive, contributing to the cultural, social, and intellectual life of Rome while navigating the challenges of the modern era.

=== Literature and scholarship ===
Throughout its long history, the Jewish community in Rome has produced notable scholars and literary figures. During the "Golden Age" of the 13th century, the community was home to Talmudists, poets, philosophers, and Kabbalists. One of the most significant literary achievements was the printing of the world's first Jewish book in Rome in 1470. This milestone marked the beginning of a rich tradition of Jewish scholarship and literature in the city.

Prominent scholars from the Roman Jewish community include Rabbi Nathan ben Jehiel, known for his work "The Arukh," a comprehensive dictionary of Talmudic and Midrashic terms. This work remains a vital resource for Jewish scholars worldwide.

=== Art and textiles ===
The Jewish community in Rome has also made remarkable contributions to the arts, particularly in the field of textiles. During the period of forced ghettoization, Roman Jews were restricted to certain professions, including money lending and working with "rags." Despite these limitations, they created beautiful and intricate textiles, many of which are now considered some of the most exquisite collections in Europe.

The Jewish Museum in Rome houses a significant collection of these textiles, including gilded Torah covers made from second-hand clothes and upholstery. One notable piece is a Torah cover made from fabric that once belonged to Queen Christina of Sweden, showcasing the community's ability to transform humble materials into works of art.

=== Cuisine ===
Jewish cuisine in Rome is a unique blend of traditional Jewish dietary laws and local Italian ingredients. The community's culinary contributions are celebrated and enjoyed by both Jews and non-Jews alike. Dishes such as Carciofi alla giudia (Jewish-style artichokes) and cassola (a type of cheesecake) are iconic examples of Roman-Jewish cuisine.

Kosher restaurants and bakeries are found throughout the city, offering a taste of traditional Jewish culinary heritage. These establishments not only serve the local Jewish population but also attract visitors from around the world who seek to experience the unique flavors of Roman-Jewish cuisine.

=== Religious life ===
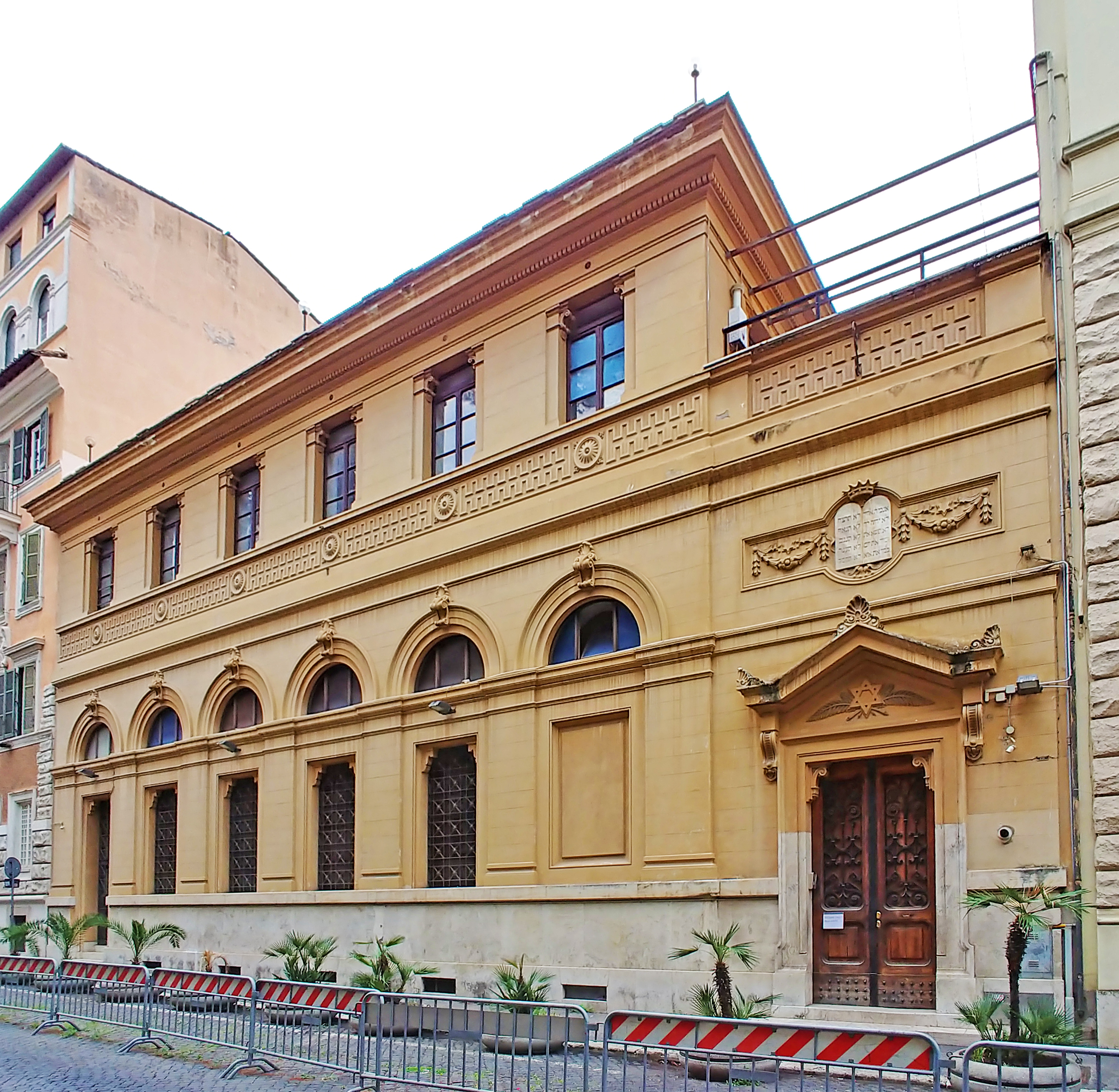
Oratorio Di Castro

Religious scholarship and practice have always been central to the Jewish community in Rome. The Great Synagogue of Rome, completed in 1904, remains a focal point for religious and community life. In addition to the Great Synagogue, there are several smaller synagogues throughout the city, catering to the diverse needs of the Jewish population.

The community maintains a strong tradition of religious education, with schools and yeshivas providing instruction in both secular and Jewish studies. This emphasis on education ensures the preservation and transmission of Jewish traditions and values to future generations.

=== Music and festivals ===
Music and festivals play an important role in the cultural life of the Jewish community in Rome. Public celebrations, such as the annual Menorah lighting in Piazza Barberini during Chanukah, draw large crowds and symbolize Jewish pride and resilience. These events are not only religious observances but also opportunities for the community to come together and celebrate their heritage.

=== Preservation of heritage ===
The Jewish community in Rome is deeply committed to preserving its cultural heritage. The Jewish Museum in Rome serves as a repository for historical artifacts, documents, and works of art that tell the story of the community's long and storied history. The museum's exhibitions and educational programs help to raise awareness about the contributions and experiences of Roman Jews.

Efforts to recover and preserve cultural artifacts lost during the Holocaust are ongoing. These initiatives highlight the importance of cultural preservation and the community's determination to honor its past while looking to the future.

=== Contemporary contributions ===
Today, the Jewish community in Rome continues to make significant contributions to the city's cultural and intellectual life. Two 20th-century Nobel Prize winners, physicist Emilio Segrè and economist Franco Modigliani, were Roman Jews, exemplifying the community's impact on the global stage.

The community's commitment to tradition is evident in the observance of Shabbat, the careful preparation of kosher food, and the vibrant life of the Jewish school. These practices ensure that the rich cultural identity of Roman Jews is preserved and passed on to future generations.

In conclusion, the cultural contributions of the Jewish community in Rome are a testament to their resilience, creativity, and enduring presence in the city. From literature and art to cuisine and religious scholarship, the community has enriched the cultural landscape of Rome and continues to play a vital role in its social and cultural life.

== Notable Monuments and Sites ==
The Jewish community in Rome has a rich history that is reflected in numerous notable monuments and sites throughout the city. These landmarks provide a glimpse into the community's long-standing presence and cultural contributions, spanning from ancient times to the modern era.

=== Great Synagogue of Rome ===
The Great Synagogue of Rome, also known as the Tempio Maggiore di Roma, is one of the most prominent symbols of the Jewish community in the city. Completed in 1904, the synagogue stands on the banks of the Tiber River, near the former Ghetto area. Its distinctive square dome is a recognizable feature of the Roman skyline. The synagogue serves as the central place of worship and community gathering, hosting religious services, cultural events, and educational programs. The building also houses the Jewish Museum of Rome, which contains a vast collection of artifacts, documents, and artworks that tell the story of Roman Jewry.

=== Jewish Museum of Rome ===
Located within the Great Synagogue, the Jewish Museum of Rome offers an in-depth look at the history and culture of the Jewish community in the city. The museum's exhibits include religious artifacts, historical documents, and works of art that span centuries. Highlights of the collection include beautifully decorated Torah covers, ancient manuscripts, and items from the period of forced ghettoization. The museum also features exhibits on the Holocaust and the impact of World War II on the Jewish community in Rome.

=== Arch of Titus ===
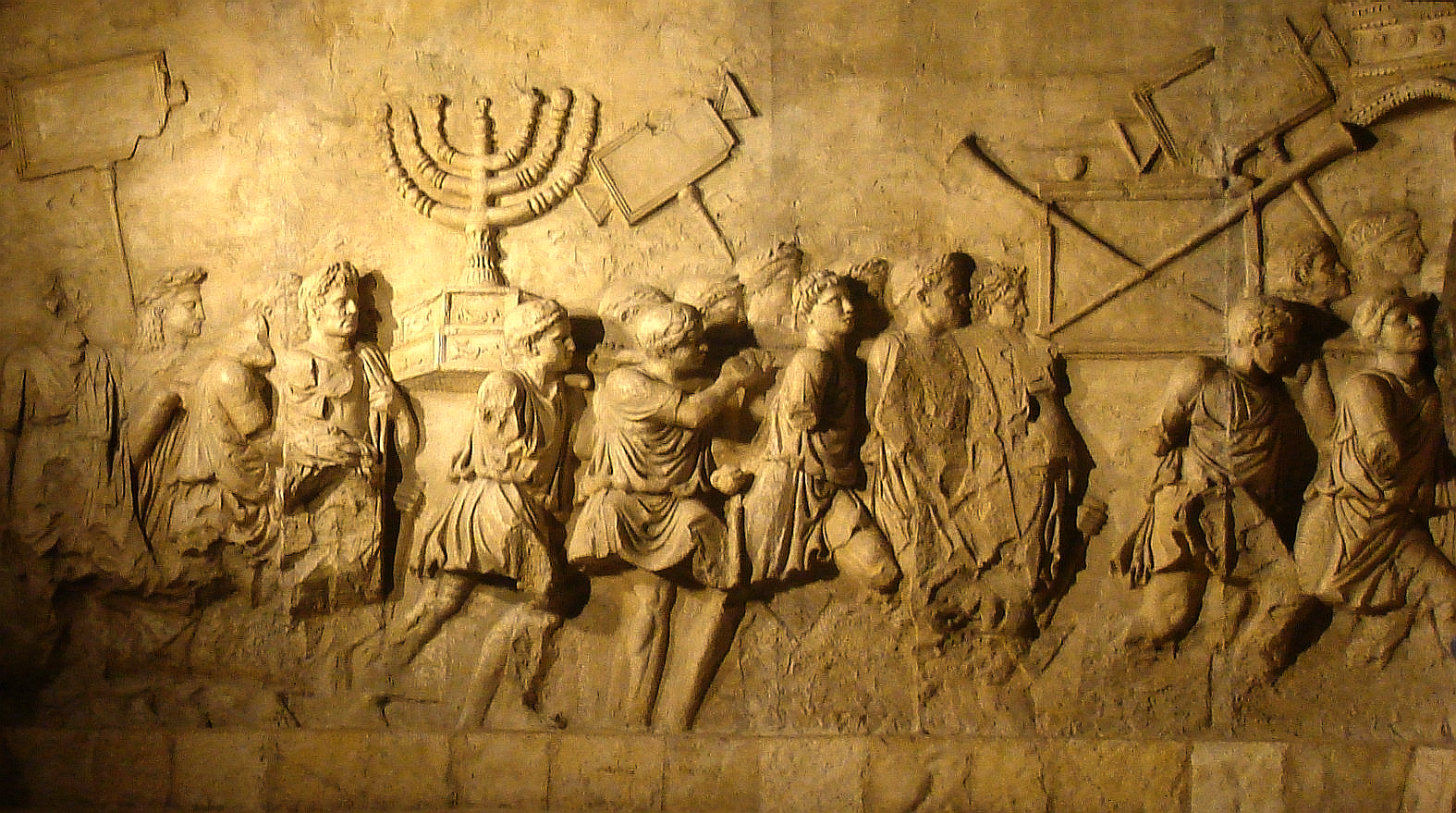
Relief from the Arch of Titus in Rome depicting a menorah and other objects looted from the Temple of Jerusalem carried in a Roman triumph

The Arch of Titus, located in the Roman Forum, is a significant monument that bears a direct connection to Jewish history. Erected in 81 CE by Emperor Domitian, the arch commemorates the Roman victory over the Jewish rebellion in Judea and the subsequent destruction of the Second Temple in Jerusalem. The reliefs on the arch depict Roman soldiers carrying spoils from the Temple, including the Menorah, which has become an iconic symbol of Jewish history. The Arch of Titus serves as a poignant reminder of the ancient Jewish presence in Rome and the community's resilience.

=== Jewish catacombs of Rome ===
The Jewish catacombs in Rome are among the oldest and most extensive in Europe. These underground burial sites date back to the 2nd and 3rd centuries CE and provide valuable insights into the early Jewish community in the city. The catacombs feature intricate carvings, inscriptions, and frescoes that reflect Jewish religious practices and beliefs. They are a testament to the community's long-standing presence and its efforts to maintain cultural and religious traditions even in times of adversity.

=== Synagogue of Ostia Antica ===
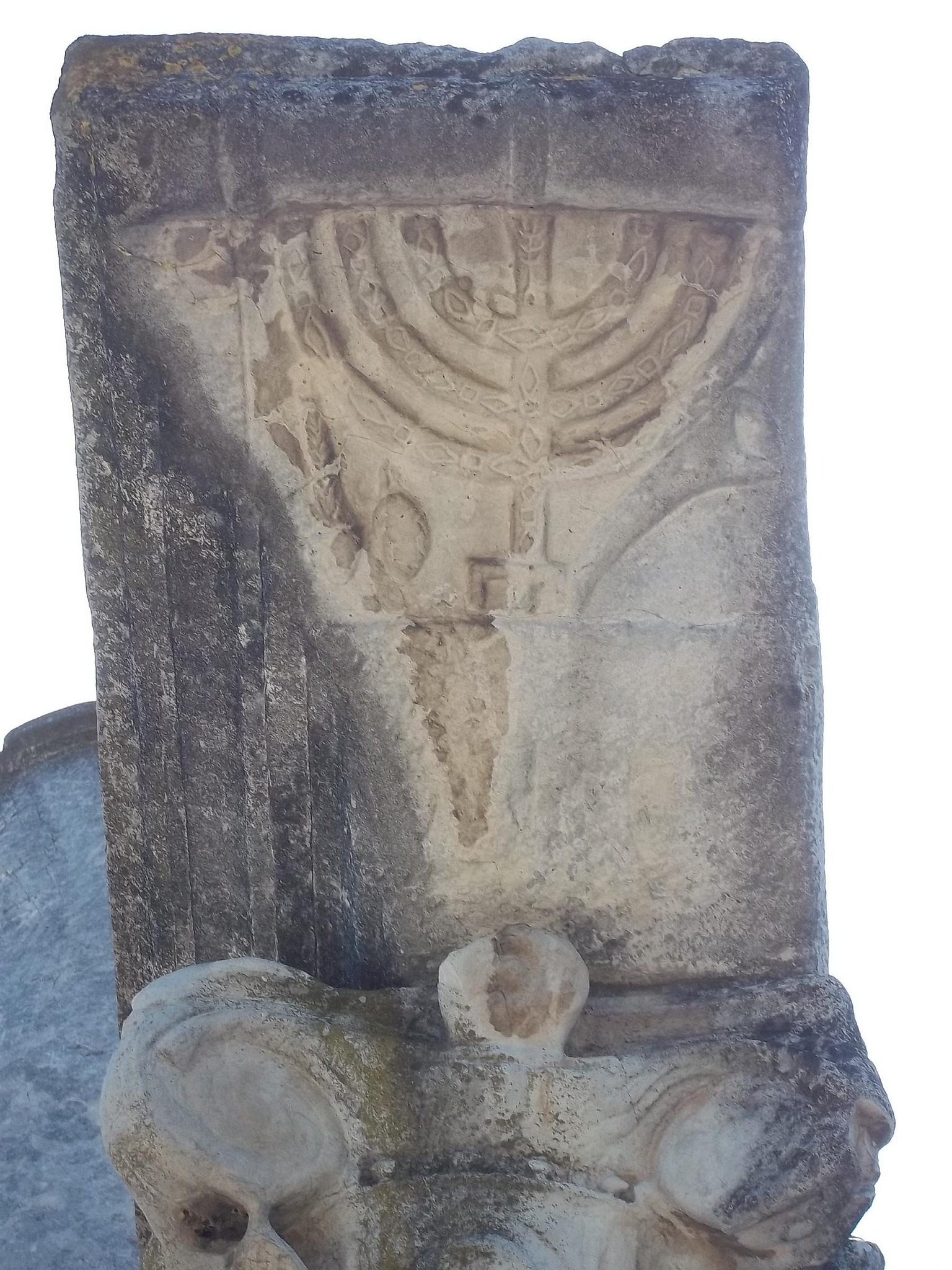
Menorah relief of Ostia Antica Synagogue

The Ostia Antica Synagogue, the ancient port city of Rome, is one of the oldest known synagogues in Europe. Discovered in 1962, the synagogue dates back to the first century CE and was in use until the fourth century. The site includes a prayer hall, study room, and an oven for baking unleavened bread. The remains of the synagogue, including the aron (ark) and bimah (pulpit), provide a fascinating glimpse into the religious life of the Jewish community during the Roman Empire.

=== Piazza delle Cinque Scole ===
Piazza delle Cinque Scole, located in the heart of the former Ghetto, is a historic square that played a central role in the life of the Jewish community. The square is named after the five synagogues (scole) that once stood in the area, serving different Jewish rites and traditions. Today, the square is a vibrant part of the Jewish Quarter, with kosher restaurants, shops, and cultural institutions that celebrate the community's heritage.

=== Turtle Fountain ===
The Turtle Fountain (Fontana delle Tartarughe) in Piazza Mattei is a Renaissance-era fountain that has become an iconic symbol of the Jewish Quarter. Designed by Giacomo della Porta and completed in the late 16th century, the fountain features bronze figures of young men and turtles. It is a popular spot for both locals and tourists, reflecting the artistic and cultural richness of the area.

=== Jewish Quarter ===
The Jewish Quarter, also known as the Roman Ghetto, is a historic district that has been home to the Jewish community since the 16th century. Established by Pope Paul IV in 1555, the Ghetto was a walled area where Jews were confined and subjected to various restrictions. Despite these hardships, the community thrived and developed a unique cultural identity. Today, the Jewish Quarter is a lively neighborhood with a rich history, featuring kosher restaurants, shops, and historic sites that attract visitors from around the world.
