= Guido Bedarida =

Italian Jewish writer (1900–1962)

Guido Berdarida
- Born: 1900; Ancona
- Died: 1962 (aged 61–62); Livorno
- Other name: Eliezer Ben David
- Occupation: Judeo-Livornese writer

Guido Bedarida (also known as Eliezer Ben David, 1900–1962) was an Italian Jewish writer. He is notable for being the main source of Judeo-Livornese literature.

== Biography ==
Bedarida was born in Ancona, the third of four children in a Sephardic Jewish family. He attended high school for 2 years and moved with his family to Livorno at 15, where he developed an interest in the local language, Judeo-Livornese. He attended college in 1919.

Instead of following in his families commercial ventures, he chose to become a lawyer. He was opposed to fascism and violence, and the latter caused him to embrace vegetarianism. He majored in history and authored several essays between 1924 and 1935 under the pseudonym Eliezer Ben David. Throughout his life he embraced Zionism, Hebrew revival and Jewish cultural awareness. In 1924 he founded the Livornese Zionist Group. He believed that in order for Jews to maintain their cultural identity they must reclaim their linguistic identity. In 1932, he married Pia Toaff, sister of the later Chief Rabbi of Rome and Venice Elio Toaff, and daughter of Alfredo Sabato Toaff the Chief Rabbi of Livorno.

During the Holocaust he and his family fled to France, then in 1943 to the Tuscan countryside and later a family home in Villa Marsiliana. After the end of the war, he returned to Livorno with his family who had also survived the Holocaust. He would restart his writing and reopened his family's business. Due to the war, he would develop serious health problems after and he died in 1962.

== Writing ==
Bedarida would be the main source for modern Judeo Livornese texts. These texts would often focus on the day-to-day lives of the Jews in Livorno. His main work being Ebrei di Livorno in 180 sonetti giudaico-livornesi (English:The Jews of Livorno in 180 Sonnets in Livornese Jewish Dialect).

== Works ==
- "The legal value of the English Mandate for Palestine" — 1922, Graduate Thesis, RMI 1925
- "Lucilla does it herself" — 1924, comedy, Livorno
- "Io Ebreo" — 1927, written with the pseudonym "Eliezer Ben David", autobiographical work published by Salomone Belforte e C. - Livorno
- "The awakened beauty" — 1927 allegorical poem
- "The Empty House" — 1927
- "A medium of ancient songs" — 1928, Città di Castello
- "I called you" — 1930 comedy in 3 acts
- "The sea" — 1930, short story
- "The Jews in Italian cultural life" — 1931
- "Saturday's Eve" — 1934, comedy, Città di Castello
- "The Silver Shekel" — 1935, comedy
- "Jews of Sardinia" — 1937
- "Jews of Italy" — 1950, in which he reports the contributions of Jews to Italian culture in the hundred years preceding publication
- "At the Memo bank and the legacy of sor Barocas" — 1950, skits in Judaeo-Livornese
- "Jews of Livorno" — 1956, 180 sonnets, Le Monnier – Florence
- "Jewish-Livornese jargon" — 1957, "Rivista di Livorno" - Livorno
- "To Pia" — 1957, Poems dedicated to his wife Pia Toaff on the occasion of their 25th wedding anniversary
- "The Jews and the Italian Risorgimento" — speech delivered at the Congress of the Italian Jewish Communities at Palazzo Barberini in 1961 and published the same year. In Judeo Livornese
