= Judeo-Livornese =

Extinct dialect of Judeo-Italian spoken in Livorno

- Bagitto
- Region: In and around Livorno
- Ethnicity: Italian Jews
- Extinct: After August 18, 1962
- Language family: Indo-European: Italic; Latino-Faliscan; Latin; Romance; Italo-Western; Italo-Dalmatian; Italo-Romance; Tuscan; Northern; Pisano-Livornese; Livornese; Judeo-Livornese
- Writing system: Latin

Language codes
- ISO 639-3: –

Judeo-Livornese or Bagitto (Italian: giudeo-livornese or bagitto) is an extinct dialect of the Judeo-Italian languages, historically spoken by the Jewish community in and around Livorno. It was heavily influenced by Judeo-Portuguese and Ladino. It is best attested through the works of Guido Bedarida.

== History ==
The Livornese dialect of Tuscan would first emerge during the 18th century when it began to diverge from the nearby Pisan dialect, due to Livorno gaining independence from Pisa in 1606. Judeo-Livornese would form at the same time as Jews from Spain and Italy would all live in Livorno. As the different languages they spoke which included Spanish, Judeo-Italian, and Ladino would all converge to form Judeo-Livornese.

The first texts in Judeo-Livornese were made by Christians, more specifically a poem based on the story of Judith. Written by a Livornese-French teacher named Luigi Duclo in 1832. An antisemite named Giovanni Guarducci would publish several plays aimed at mocking the Jews in the 1840s–1860s. Though these texts are now extremely rare likely due to the local jews destroying them.

The Jewish community in Livorno would number at 5,000 by 1800 but by 1900 it would lower to only 2,500. During WW2 60-90% of Livorno would be destroyed and 108 of Livorno's 2250 Jews would be killed in the holocaust. After the war only half or around 1,000 would stay in Livorno with the rest leaving. Today the community numbers 700 but few of its current members are descendants of the old community.

Linguists used to believe that Judeo-Livornese was a dialect of Ladino but later research has shown it a Tuscan dialect with Ladino influence.

== Characteristics ==
Judeo-Livornese has a lot of loanwords from Ladino and Hebrew. There are also several archaic traits from older varieties of Tuscan. The Ladino loanwords include several loan translations.

There is a wide usage of antiphrasis in Judeo-Livornese one example being Ber-aḥaim literally meaning "The house of life" but being used to mean "Graveyard". There are also a large amount of phonetic distortion oftentimes replaces a phoneme in the middle of a word with an r, tarsanìm instead of tafsanìm

== Usage ==
Judeo-Livornese would be used alongside several other languages by Livorno's Jewish community. Aramaic and Hebrew were used for prayers, Ladino for literature, and Ladino or Judeo-Portuguese among the upper class Jews. The ones who used Judeo-Livornese were the lower class Jews as it was avoided by the upper class due to its lack of prestige.

== Media ==
The first texts in Judeo-Livornese would come about in 1832 which was a comedic poem by a teacher named Luigi Duclo. The most famous writer in Judeo-Livornese is Guido Bedarida, who wrote under the stage name of Eliezer Ben David. He would publish works in 1924, 28, 35, 49, 50 and 1956.

== Sample Text ==
Judeo-Livornese	English
per la mi/tu’/su’ vita	on my/your/his/her life
bimba da far bimbi	feminine child with whom to make children
invito	refreshments
frati	friars, doughnut
Allo spedale	At the hospital
L'ammalta Ebrea	The sick Jewish
tarsanìm	Policeman
