= Judaeo-Catalan =

Jewish language spoken in the northeastern Iberian Peninsula

- Catalanic
- קטלאנית יהודית
- Region: Catalonia
- Ethnicity: Catalonian Jews
- Extinct: (date missing)
- Language family: Indo-European: Italic; Latino-Faliscan; Latin; Romance; Italo-Western; Western; Gallo-Iberian?; Gallo-Romance or Iberian Romance; Occitano-Romance?; Catalan; Judaeo-Catalan
- Early forms: Old Latin: Vulgar Latin; Proto-Romance; Old Gallo-Romance?; Old Occitan?; Old Catalan

Language codes
- ISO 639-3: None (mis)
- Glottolog: None

Judaeo-Catalan (Hebrew: קטלאנית יהודית; Catalan: judeocatalà, IPA: [ʒuˌðewkətəˈla]), also called Catalanic or Qatalanit (Hebrew: קאטאלנית; Catalan: catalànic or qatalanit), was a presumed Jewish language spoken by the Jews in Northern Catalonia and what is today Northeastern Spain, especially in Catalonia, Valencia and the Balearic Islands.

Linguistically, it has been described as sharing many features in common with early Judaeo-Provençal. This would be the case of the Jews living in Old Catalonia, stretching between Perpignan and Barcelona, linked with Occitania at least until the battle of Muret in 1213. Most Jewish texts in this area are written in Catalan with Hebrew characters. However, in western and southern Catalonia, Judaeo-Catalan should have been quite distinct from Judaeo-Provençal, mostly as a result of the Moorish conquest of Iberia. The golden age of Judaeo-Catalan is supposed to have been between the early 12th century and 1492, when the Jews were expelled from Spain by Alhambra Decree.

However, the very existence of the Judeo-Catalan is debated. While authors like Paul Wexler defend its existence, it is usually understood that "the evidence of its existence is scarce, although texts are known that mix Catalan and Hebrew, and the subject is rather controversial".

In one of the few investigations on the subject, Feliu and Ferrer (2011) analyzed a set of notarial texts of 1443, and concluded that their analysis "allows us to sign the death certificate of a linguistic ghost – the supposed 'Judeo-Catalan dialect' that never was". Another subsequent study of some songs from the same period suggests the existence of a "linguistic repertoire of the Jews of medieval Catalonia", although it does not prove the existence of a dialect proper.

== See also ==
- Jewish languages
- Judaeo-Romance languages
- Judeo-Provençal

== Sources ==
- Argenter, Joan (2013). "Iberian language ecology: notes on history and current situation". In Jahr, Ernst Håkon; Trudgill, Peter; Vandenbussche, Wim (eds.). Language Ecology of the 21st Century: Social Conflicts in their Linguistic Environment. Oslo: Novus Forlag. pp. 137–164.
- Feliu, Francesc; Ferrer, Joan (2011). "Judaeo-Catalan: In Search of a Mediaeval Dialect that Never Was". Journal of Medieval Iberian Studies. 3 (1): 41–60. doi:10.1080/17546559.2011.556702. S2CID 162553109.
- Brinner, William. "Jewish Languages – European". Mishkan.com.
- "judeocatalà" [Judaeo-Catalan]. enciclopèdia.cat (in Catalan).
