= Mantuan dialect =

Dialect of Emilian

Mantuan
- Mantovano
- Mantuàn, Mantfàn
- Native to: Italy
- Region: Mantua
- Ethnicity: Mantuans
- Native speakers: ~170,000
- Language family: Indo-European: Italic; Latino-Faliscan; Latin; Romance; Italo-Western; Western Romance; Gallo-Romance; Gallo-Italic; Emilian–Romagnol; Emilian; Mantuan
- Dialects: Judeo-Mantuan †
- Writing system: Latin

Language codes
- ISO 639-3: None (mis)
- Glottolog: None
- Linguasphere: 51-AAA-okb
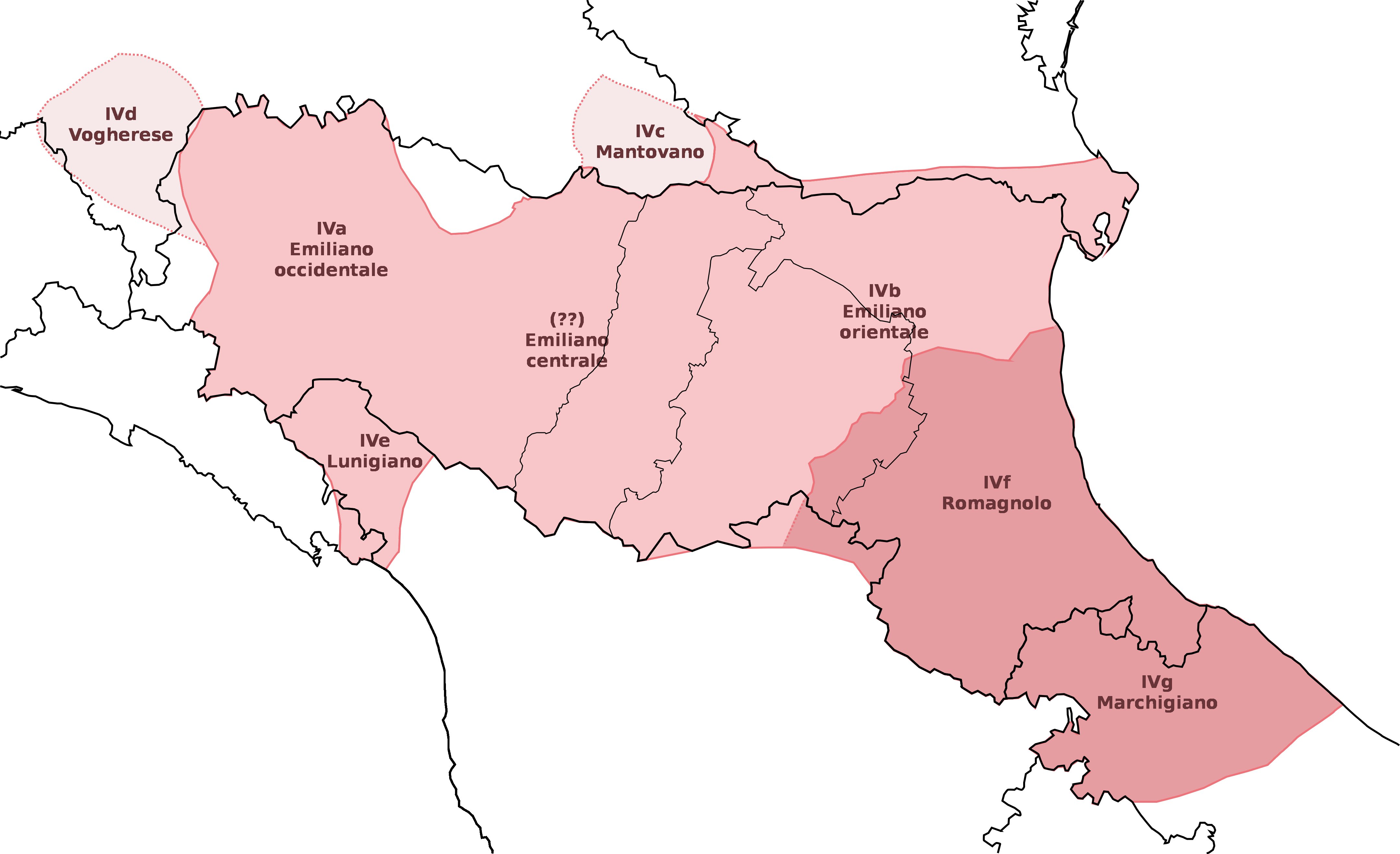
- Dialects of Emilian, including Mantuan (Mantovano)

Mantuan (also known as Mantovano) is a Gallo-Italic dialect of Emilian that was also influenced by Lombard. According to Bernardino Biondelli's work Saggio sui dialetti gallo-italici from 1853, Mantuan is an Emilian dialect belonging to the Ferrarese subgroup together with Mirandolese and Ferrarese.

== History ==
The Mantuan dialect was born from Vulgar Latin, grafted onto the Celtic language spoken by the Gauls who then populated the Po Valley. Like the other Gallo-Italic dialects, it has undergone various influences throughout history, including Lombard and Emilian (which was itself a Gallo-Italic language, under the Canossa family of Reggio Emilia). In addition to more recent influences, due to Austrian domination. However, it is worth underlining the phonetic and pronunciation differences that differentiate this dialect from the dialects of adjacent areas. A characteristic of the Mantuan dialect, both spoken and written (unlike the Emilian dialects), is the lack of the letter "z", replaced with "s" (calsét = calza = sock) or with "sz" (sound expressed with the notation "capital S", (raSor = rasoio = razor) which make the speech softer. Furthermore, in most of the province, the abundance of sounds such as Ö and Ü stands out, almost absent in the neighbouring Emilian dialects, accentuating the difference in pronunciation with the latter.

== Dialects ==
The Province of Mantua is divided into four large dialect groups: the pure Mantuan dialect (spoken in Mantua and in the central area of the province, where the Emilian dialect is influenced by elements of transition with the Veronese dialect and the Upper Mantuan dialect), the Upper Mantuan dialect (of a predominantly Eastern Lombard nature but with evident influences of the city Mantuan, spoken in Upper Mantua, i.e. the northern area of the province of Mantua), the Lower Mantuan dialect (of a pure Emilian nature, in transition with the Ferrarese, the Mirandolese and the Guastallese, spoken in the southern area in the Oltrepò Mantovano), and the Casalasco-Viadanese, a dialect which presents striking similarities with the Parmigiano, so much so that it is probably a variant of it; Spoken in the Viadana and Sabbioneta area, in the province of Mantua, and in the Casalmaggiore area, in the Province of Cremona. The level of comprehension is fair, especially among the central and southern areas, much less so with the Upper Mantuan dialect, which belongs to the Lombard dialect group, to the point of reaching levels of difficult mutual understanding between inhabitants at the extremes of the province bordering Brescia and Ferrara/Modena.

In the municipalities of the Lower Mantua and Oltrepò areas, the Lower Mantuan dialect is spoken, a fundamentally different Mantuan dialect and indisputably of Emilian type: in the municipalities on the Modena border (Poggio Rusco in particular) one can notice a slight influence from the nearby province and a slight strengthening of the typical closed sounds "Ö" and "Ü". In Sermide e Felonica, the Mantuan dialect tends to disappear in favor of a more markedly Ferrarese dialect, losing its characteristic closed sounds (Ö and Ü). The Lower Reggiana dialect area (Guastalla, Luzzara and Reggiolo) is also part of the Lower Mantuan dialect area, with an dialect almost similar to that of the Lower Mantuan dialect.

Also in the Lower Mantua area, near the provinces of Parma and Reggio Emilia, in the areas of Viadana and Sabbioneta, Casalasco-Viadanese is spoken, a transitional dialect between Mantuan and Parmesan. In the northern part of the Oglio-Po River, in the areas of Rivarolo Mantovano and Bozzolo, the dialect remains closer to Mantuan.

Near the Verona border (Castel d'Ario, Villimpenta, Roverbella), the blending with the Veronese dialect is noticeable (Ponti sul Mincio, Monzambano, Roverbella, Castelbelforte, Castel d'Ario, etc.). The influence of the Ferrarese dialect on the municipalities bordering this province is quite evident.

The Mantuan dialect, however, is not spoken in the area that includes the municipalities located in the Upper Mantua area. The most important are Asola, Castel Goffredo, and Castiglione delle Stiviere, where the Upper Mantuan dialect is spoken, strongly influenced by the Brescian dialect and, in the eastern areas, for example in Monzambano, also by the Veronese dialect. In Ponti sul Mincio, the northernmost municipality in the Mantuan province and bordering Peschiera del Garda, only the Veronese dialect is spoken. For obvious geographical reasons, the dialect spoken in Castiglione delle Stiviere is very close to the Brescian dialect.

== Grammar ==
They are properties of the Mantuan dialect, compared to the corresponding Italian words:

- Apocope of vowels, except "a", common to most other Gallo-Italic dialects (e.g.: far and dir for fare and dire) and, in some cases, also the intermediate ones (e.g.: nisün and semnar for nessuno and seminare);
- Result of the Latin "scl" (Italian "schi") or of words with the same consonantal connection, but originally allogeneic to it, in "s'ci" (e.g.: s'ciopp for "schioppo");
- Change of occlusive consonants from voiceless to voiced, such as "t" to voiced "d" (e.g., didal for "ditale"), "p" to "b" (e.g., banca for "panca"), "c" and "g" to "s" (e.g., sisòra and snòćć for "cesoia" and "ginocchio").
- Absence of the sound [t͡s] (replaced by the hard "s" sound) and almost never the "v" (replaced by a sound similar to "u").

In Mantuan, another word between the subject and the verb is added (a, at, al, la, a, a, i). Unlike the subject, these "particles" can't be understood, so they could be a second subject to avoid confusing the people being spoken to, or an initial part of the verb that's the same in all cases.

The past participles of the verbs listed are:

- Èssar - stà
- 'Vergh - avì/awü
- Vegnar - gni/gnü
- Andar - andá
- Restar - restá

== Vocabulary ==
=== Anthroponyms ===
In Mantuan, the pronunciation of many names also changes slightly compared to Italian. Below are the 25 most common male names in Italy with their pronunciation in Mantuan alongside.

- Andrea → Andrèa
- Luca → Lüca
- Marco → Màrcu
- Francesco → Francéscu
- Matteo → Matéu
- Alessandro → Lissàndar / Alésàndru
- Davide → Dàuide
- Simone → Simón / Simóne
- Federico → Federìco / Federìcu
- Lorenzo → Loréns / Lurénsu
- Lucia → Lüsìa / Lösia
- Mattia → Matìa
- Stefano → Stèfano / Stéwan
- Giuseppe → Giüsèpe / Gèpe
- Riccardo → Ricàrdu
- Daniele → Danièle / Daniéle
- Michele → Michél
- Alessio → Alèsiu
- Antonio → Antòniu / Antòni
- Giovanni → Giuàn / Giuàni
- Nicola → Nicòla
- Gabriele → Gabriéle
- Fabio → Fàbiu
- Alberto → Albèrtu
- Giacomo → Giàcum
- Giulio → Giülio

== Texts ==
=== Proverbs ===
Ch'as ciava l'avarésia: a màgnom 'n öv in trì e la balòta a la mìtom in dal sfòi admàn!
Andàr in còlara l'è da òm, stàragh l'è da bèstia.
Chi ia fa a 's dismèntga, e chi ricév sü a tègn a mènt.

=== Our Father ===
Pàdar nòstar, ch'at sè in ciél,
ch'al sìa santificà al tu nom,
ch'al vegna al tu règn,
ch'la végna fàta la tu volontà,
in ciél cóm in tèra.
Dàs incò al nòstar pan cutidiàn,
e armèt a nuàltar i nòstar débit,
isè com nuàltar li armètom ai nòstar debitùr.
E non indùras in tentasiòn,
ma réndas lìbar dal mal, amen.

=== Parable of the Prodigal Son ===
Ón òm al gh'avéva dü fiöi.
E 'l piü zóvan 'd lór l'ha dit a sò pàdar: "Papà, dam cla part de patrimòni che am tóca!" e lü al g'ha divìs la ròba.
E dòp pòchi gióran, mücià sü tüt, al fiöl piü zóvan l'è andà ind una tèra luntàna, e là l'ha strüsià la sò sustànsa, vivènd da lüsüriùs.
E dòp ch'l'ha 'vü cunsümà tüt, è gnü in quèl sit 'na gran carestìa, e lü stès l'ha prinsipià a vér de bizógn.
E l'è andà e 'l s'è mìs a servìr ón sitadìn de cla tèra, che 'l l'ha mandà ind la sò campàgna, perché cundüzès föra i pursèi.
E l'avrìa vulü impinìras la pànsa có le giànde che mangiàva i pòrch, ma nisün gh'an dàva.
Alùra, turnànd in lü stès, l'ha dit: "Quànti servitùr in càza 'd mè pàdar i g'ha del pan in abundànsa, e mì chì möri de fam!
Am farò spìrit e andarò da mè pàdar e agh dirò: "Papà, hò ofés al Signùr e tì;
zà 'n són dégn d'ésar ciamà tò fiöl; tòm cóme ón di tò servitùr".
E al s'è tòlt sü e l'è andà vèrs sò pàdar. Quand l'éra ancùra luntàn sò pàdar al l'ha vist, al s'è mòs a cumpasión e, curèndagh incùntra, al s'è bütà e l'ha bazà.
E 'l fiöl al g'ha dit: "Papà, hò ofés al Signùr e tì. Zà 'n són piü dégn d'ésar ciamà tò fiöl".
Ma 'l pàdar l'ha dit ai sò servitùr: "Prest, purtègh chì la piü bèla vèsta e vestìl, metìgh l'anèl al dit e le scàrpe ai pè;
e menè chì ón vdèl ingrasà, masèl e magnémal e stém alégar;
parchè 'stu mè fiöl l'éra mòrt e l'è resüsità, l'éra pèrs e l'è stà truà!" e i s'è mìs a magnàr.
Intànt sò fiöl piü vècc e, quand l'è turnà e l'è stà darént a càza, l'ha sentì ch'i sunàva e i cantàva.
E l'ha ciamà 'n servitùr e 'l g'ha dmandà cus'éra cla ròba.
E quèst al g'ha dit: "È rivà tò fradèl e tò pàdar l'ha masà 'n vdèl gras, parchè l'è turnà san e salv".
L'è andà sübit in còlera e no 'l voléva 'ndàr déntar; sò pàdar dùnca l'è gnü e l'ha cuminsià a pregàral.
Ma quèl, rispundèndagh, l'ha dit a sò pàdar: "Ècu, tanti an che 't sèrvi, e an hò mài trascürà i tò órdin, e 'n at m'hè mài dà ón cavrét da magnàr cói mè amìgh;
Ma, sübit rivà 'stu tò fiöl, che l'ha strüsià tüt al sò cun dle sgualdrìne, at g'hè fat cupàr ón vdèl ingrasà".
Ma quèl al g'ha dit: "Fiöl, tì 't sè sémpar cun mì, e tüt al mè l'è tò;
Ma l'éra bén giüst magnàr e star alégar, parchè 'stu tò fradèl l'éra mòrt e l'è resüsità, l'éra pèrs e l'è stà truà".

=== Theatrical dialogue by Attilio Zuccagni-Orlandini ===
- Master: Eben, Batista, gh'èt fat, cal t'ho dit?
- Servant: Siorsì, al staga sicür che mì gh'ho fat cal che hoo pudüü per mustràmegh puntüal. Stamatina, a le ses e ün quart mì a sera zà in viazz, a le set e mezza mì a sera a mità strada, a le ot e trii quart andava dentar in cità, ma pò al gh'ha tant piövüt!
- Master: Eh, al solit tì 't saree staa a far al pultron int 'na qual ustaria a sptàrgh a 'n piövess. Par cosa n'èt tölt con tì l'umbrela?
- Servant: Oh bela, par an purtar con mì cl'imbroj; e pò iersira, quand a son andaa a let, a 'n piöveva miga e, se piöveva, piöveva puchissim; 'sta matina, int l'alba, quanda mì a son levaa sü, l'era seren, e int l'alvaras al sol al s'è nivulaa; a mezza matina a s'è alvaa ün gran vent, ma incambi da serenaras a l'è 'gnüü zò üna tempesta che l'ha dürat mezzura, e pò s'è miss a piövar a secc arvers.

=== Another story by Boccasc ===
==== Mantuan dialect ====
A ì dùnca da savér che ind al tèmp che a Cìpri a gh'éra 'l prim rè, dòp che Gofrè ad Büglión l'avéa ciapà Tèra Sànta, è sücès che üna gran siùra francéza l'è andàda al Sepülcar dal nòstar Siùr, e ind al turnàr indré l'è pasàda par Cìpri,indùa du scavesacòi i 'gh n'ha fat da tüt li sòrti. E lé, daspràda par la sö disgràsia, l'ha pensà d'andàr dal rè a fàras giüstìsia. Ma i g'ha dit ch'la podéva vansà, che al rè l'éra acsì da pòch ch'al n'al s'la toléva gnanch par lü, e ch'al mandàva zò li piü gròsi ingiüri ch'i 'gh fàva, in manéra che tüti i podéva fàrach quèl ch'i voléva. Ascoltànd 'sta siùra 'sti còzi chì, e conoscénd che par lé a n'ach podéva ésar piü rimédi, l'è volüda andàr l'istès dal rè par fàrgan 'na bèla; e pianzénd cóme mài, la g'ha dit: "Cara 'l mè siùr, mé a 'n sòn mìga chì da vü parchè a 'm fèghi qualcòza par mì da quèl ch'a m'è stà fat, ma sulamént sòn gnüda a pregàrav ch'a m'insgnèghi cóma fè a süpürtàr tüti i insült ch'i 'f fa, parchè ànca mì pòsa imparà a süpürtàr i mè, che al sa al Signùr, s'a podès, a v'ià donarìa vontéra, parchè sò che vü a sì brav da pasàrvla vìa".
Al re, santénd 'stu discùrs, al s'è tüt vergugnà e, facéndas spìrit, l'ha cominsià intànt a castigàr bén chi birbùn ch'éva ofés la siùra francéza, e pò dòp l'ha seguità a far giüstìsia par lü, e difèndar l'unùr dla sö curùna, el n'ha lasà pasà piü nisüna.

==== Bozzolo dialect ====
Dónca av dìghi ch'al témp dal prém rè 'd Cìpri, dòp che Gotifrè 'd Bügliòn l'avè ciapà la Tèra Sànta, è sücès che 'na siùra 'd Guascógna l'è andàda in pelegrinàcc al Sepùlcar e ind al turnà indré l'è pasàda per Cìpri, dùa l'è stàda maltratàda da di balòs. Lé, tüta rabiàda per st'asiòn, e non savènd còza fà, l'ha pensà d'andà dal rè; ma i g'ha dét sübit che 'l sarés témp trat vìa inütilmènt, parchè l'éra 'n òm tant da póch e stras, che nò 'l tolìva al strach d'vendicà gl'insült fat a chiàter, ma gnànca cói fat a lü; tant l'è véra che cói ch'a gh'ìva qualcòs cóntra 'd lü, i sa sfogàva fazèndagh ògni sòrt d'asiòn. Cla siùra che, santènd acsé, l'ìva pèrs ògni sperànsa d'èsar vendicàda, per volés procurà 'na sudisfasiòn in mès al sò dispiazér, l'ha pensà 'd volì dàgh al rè, in bùna manéra, dal bòn d'angót; e, andàndagh pianzulènta davànti, la g'ha dét: "Càra 'l mè siùr, mé végni mìa ché pr'èsar vendicàda di insült ch'i m'ha fat, ma parchè t'am fàghi almèn al piazér d'inseiàm cmüta 't fè a portà tüti cói che, da cól ch'a sènti, i 't fa 'nca a té; parchè, quànd aró savì cmüta 't fè, alùra podró portà con püsè pasiènsa cól ch'i m'ha fat a mé; cla pasiènsa ch'la sa 'l Signór, s'avès da pudì at vorès donà, zà che at sè portàla acsé bén".
Al rè, che fin alùra l'éra stà trascurà e pìgar, cóma s'al s'füdès tüt in 'na vòlta dasmisià, cominciànd di insült fat a 'sta dóna, ch'al g'ha vendicà a sangh, l'è dventà rigorós cóntra tüti cói che dòp i s'è ris'cià da fà qualcòs cóntra l'onór dla sò coróna.

==== Ostiglia dialect ====
A digh dónca ch'al témp da prim rè 'd Cìpri, dòp che Gofrè 'd Bügliòn l'ha desliberà Gerüzalèm dài Türch, gh'éra 'na siùra ch'l'è 'ndàda par 'n aòt al Sant Sepùlcar e, ind al turnàr, quànd l'è rivàda a Cìpri, da 'nsoquànti da 'sti scavesacòi agh n'è stà dit e fat da tüt li sgnàdi. 'Sta pòvra dòna an s'an pudènd dar pas, la voléva andàr dal re, par fargh insgnàr. Ma i g'ha vulü far crédar ch'l'era fadìga pèrsa: che lü l'éra csì trascüra e csì da póch, che pasiènsia pr'i tórt ch'a 's fàva ai àltar, ma ch'al na s'an toléva gnànca par chi tànti ch'igh fàva a lü, ch'l'éra fin 'na vargógna màrsa, tant che chi gh'éva bìla al s'dasfugàva con di insolènsi a lü. 'Sta dòna, daspràda 'd vendicàras, par fàrsla un póch pasàr, la s'è mìsa in tèsta d'andàr a smüstasàr al rè d'èsar csì mìzar. E, tòltas sü pianzànd, quand la s'è vìsta d'adnans a lü, l'ha tacà a dir: "Al mè siùr, mì an són mìnga gnüda parchè vója giüstìsia, ma par tüt rimédi, av préghi ch'a m'insgnèghi cóma fè vü a mandàr zó tant da ladìn tüti cl'ingròsi che mì a sò ch'iv fa, parchè da vü imparànd ànca mì pòsa con pasiènsia supurtàr l'ingiüria ch'i m'ha fat: che, s'a pudès, al Signùr al la sa quànt vuluntéra v'la donaréa a vü, pòst ch'a fè csì bèl a supurtàli".
Al rè, che infin alùra l'éra stà intrégh e mìzar, a pars cóma ch'al s'dasmisiès e, tacànd da l'ingiüria da 'sta dòna, ch'al l'ha castigàda ma da bòn, l'è dvantà 'l pü sütìl ch'agh sìa mài stà, che guài dòp a tucàral ind l'unùr dla sò curùna.

== Bibliography ==
- Biondelli, Bernardino (1853). Saggio sui dialetti gallo-italici (in Italian). archive.org.
- Papanti, Giovanni (1875). I parlari italiani in Certaldo alla festa del v centenario di Messer Giovanni Boccacci: omaggio di Giovanni Papanti (in Friulian). Tipi di F. Vigo.
