= Judeo-Roman dialect =

Dialect of Judeo-Italian spoken in Rome

Judeo-Roman
- Giudeo-Romanesco (Italian) ג'ודיו רומן (Hebrew)
- Native to: Italy, Israel
- Ethnicity: Italian Jews
- Native speakers: 200 in Italy 250 in total (2022)
- Language family: Indo-European: Italic; Latino-Faliscan; Latin; Romance; Italo-Western; Italo-Dalmatian; Italo-Romance; Central Italian; Romanesco; Judeo-Roman

Language codes
- ISO 639-3: –

Judeo-Roman (Italian: Giudaico-Romanesco/ Giudaico Romanesca) or Italkit is the only still living dialect of the Judeo-Italian languages, historically used by the Jews living in Rome. It is spoken by 250 people, most of whom live in Italy. The language is on the decline and most of its remaining speakers are elderly. There are efforts to preserve the language and keep it from extinction.

== History ==
Judeo-Roman, like other Jewish languages, emerged due to the Jews of Rome being isolated in the Rome Ghetto, on order of the Pope. The language declined as Jews were emancipated and Roman Jews switched to the Roman dialect of Italian.

Younger Italian Jews are attempting to preserve the language.

== Vocabulary ==
Judeo-Roman has at least 360 Hebrew words and phrases in it. Many of these were used to conceal what the users were saying from Christians. examples include:

Judeo-Roman	Root Hebrew Word	English
Kadosc Baruchù	Kadosh Baruch Hu	Holy blessed be he
Caròvve	Karov	Close relative
Mangkòdde	Ma’ot	Money
Ngesa’vve	‘Esav	Christian/Christians

== Phonology ==
Judeo-Italian has several phonetic shifts that differentiate it from standard Italian; these include:

/e/ becoming /i/ (e.g. detto to ditto)

/l/ becoming /r/ (e.g. qualcuno to quarcuno)

It also contains several vowel shifts and other changes:

Loss of initial vowels (e.g. oppure to pure)

Loss of final consonants (e.g. con to co')

Contractions (e.g. dirte to ditte)

Archaisms (e.g. de te to d'oo ti)

== In media ==
=== Plays ===
A theater group called Chaimme 'a sore 'o sediaro e 'a moje (Chaim, the sister, the chairmaker and the wife) makes plays in Judeo-Roman.

=== Writing ===
There is a collection of poems written by Crescenzo del Monte from 1908 and republished in 2007 in Judeo Roman. These works include The sonnets of Crescenzo del Monte.

=== Internet ===
Several YouTube videos have been posted in Judeo-Roman.

== Sample text ==
Judeo-Roman	English
Jorno	Day
Capeto	Understood
Ar	At the
Letigate	Fight
Gniente	Nothing
Quarcuno	Someone
Quarche	Some
Aremane	To remain
Kadosc Baruchù	Holy blessed be he

Judeo-Roman	English
Due donne sono sedute vicino alla pasticceria del Portico d’Ottavia, Settimia e Fiorella. Come pretenni che fieto parli bene ancora un ajo capeto, tu e mariteto tutto o jorno, ‘o sento io, che letigate in giudaico Romanesco. te sbai Settì ce stamo attenti, da retta a me, me devi da crede ‘o stamo proprio a fa pe lui, un volemo che viè sù che i ngaciri dicheno che è uno de piazza.	Two women are seated near the pastry shop at the Portico d’Ottavia, [their names are] Settimia and Fiorella How you can pretend that your son speaks well, I still don't understand. You and your husband all day — I heard it myself, that you quarrel in Giudaico-Romanesco. You are mistaken Settì, we are careful. Listen to me, you have to believe me, we are specifically doing it for him. I don't want him to grow up so that the rich [people] say that he is one from the Piazza [the Ghetto].
