= Italian Jews =

Ethnic group

Italian Jewish people Italkim יהודים איטלקים
Total population
- 60,000

Regions with significant populations
- Italy: 30,000 (secular and religious) (Note: As reported by the American Jewish Year Book (2007), on a total Italian population of circa 58 million people, which therefore is approx. 0.1% of the population. Greater concentrations are in Rome and Milan. As data originate from records kept by the various Italian Jewish congregations (which means they register "observant" Jews who have somehow had to go through basic rituals such as the Brit Milah or Bar/Bat Mitzvah etc.). Excluded are therefore "ethnic Jews", lay Jews, atheist/agnostic Jews, et al. – cfr. "Who is a Jew?". If these are added, then the total population would increase, possibly to approx. 50,000 Jews in Italy, not counting recent migrations from North Africa and Eastern Europe.)
- Israel: 30,000

Languages
- Italian, Hebrew, Judeo-Italian languages and dialects (historically), Yiddish, Ladino

Religion
- Judaism

Related ethnic groups
- Jews, Sephardi Jews, Ashkenazi Jews, Israelis

Italian Jews (Italian: ebrei italiani; Hebrew: יהודים איטלקים) can be used in a broad sense to mean all Jews living in or with roots in Italy, or, in a narrower sense, to mean the Italkim, an ancient community living in Italy since the Ancient Roman era, who use the Italian liturgy (or "Italian Rite") as distinct from those Jewish communities in Italy dating from medieval or modern times who use the Sephardic liturgy or the Nusach Ashkenaz.

== Name ==
Italkim have descent from the Jews who lived in Italy during the Roman period. Their Nusach is distinct from the Sephardic Nusach and the Ashkenazi Nusach, and are sometimes referred to in the scholarly literature as Italkim (Hebrew for "Italians"; pl. of italki, Middle Hebrew loanword from the Latin adjective italicu(m), meaning "Italic", "Latin", "Roman"; italkit is also used in Modern Hebrew as the word for "Italian language" (singular). They have traditionally spoken a variety of Judeo-Italian languages.

== Divisions ==
Italian Jews historically fall into four categories.

1. Italkim, Jews of the "Italian Rite" who have resided in Italy since Roman times; see below.
2. Sephardi Jews, in particular Spanish and Portuguese Jews, i.e., Jews who arrived in Italy following their expulsion from the Iberian Peninsula. The Kingdom of Spain expelled Jews with the 1492 Alhambra Decree and the persecution of Jews and Muslims by Manuel I of Portugal led to their forced conversion to Roman Catholicism in 1497, at which time many Iberian Jews immigrated to Italy. In addition, in 1533, Iberian Sephardi Jews were forced out of the Spanish territory/colony in Italy known as the Kingdom of Naples and began migrating to other parts of the Italian peninsula. These groups also include anusim, crypto-Jewish families who left Iberia in subsequent centuries and reverted to Judaism in Italy, as well as immigration by Sephardi families which had lived in the Eastern Mediterranean following expulsion from the Iberian Peninsula before coming to Italy.
3. Ashkenazi Jews, living mainly in Northern Italy and Central Italy.
4. The Jews of Asti, Fossano, and Moncalvo ("Appam"). These represent the Jews expelled from France beginning in 1182 subsequent to the Rhineland massacres after the First Crusade. Their liturgy is similar to that of the Ashkenazim, but contains some distinctive usages descended from the French Jews of the time of Rashi, particularly in the services for the High Holy Days.

Historically these communities remained separate: in a given city there was often an "Italian synagogue" and a "Spanish synagogue", and occasionally a "German synagogue" as well. In many cases these have since amalgamated, but a given synagogue may have services of more than one rite.

Today there are further categories:

- The Jews of San Nicandro who are converts, descendants of the neofiti (anusim) of San Nicandro Garganico;
- Persian Jews living in Rome and Milan;
- Libyan Jews living in Rome and Livorno.

== History ==
Italian Jews can be traced as far back as the 2nd century BCE: tombstones and dedicatory inscriptions survive from this period. At that time they mostly lived in the far South of Italy, with a branch community in Rome, and were generally Greek-speaking. It is thought that some families (for example the Adolescenti) are descendants of Jews deported from Judaea by the emperor Titus in 70 CE. In early medieval times there were major communities in southern Italian cities such as Bari and Otranto. Medieval Italian Jews also produced important halachic works such as the Shibbole ha-Leḳeṭ of Zedekiah ben Abraham Anaw. Following the expulsion of the Jews from the Kingdom of Naples in 1533, the centre of gravity shifted to Rome and the north.

Two of the most famous of Italy's Jews were Obadiah ben Jacob Sforno (1475–1550) and Moshe Chaim Luzzatto (1707–1746) whose written religious and ethical works are still widely studied.

The Italian Jewish community as a whole has numbered no more than 50,000 since it was fully emancipated in 1861. During the Second Aliyah (between 1904 and 1914) many Italian Jews moved to Israel. Around 7,700 Italian Jews were deported and murdered during the Holocaust.

In 1951 the Conegliano Veneto Synagogue, originally built in 1701 in the town's Jewish ghetto, was dismantled and transferred in its entirety to Israel. It was rebuilt and formally dedicated in Jerusalem in 1952, and operates until today as the Italian Synagogue of Jerusalem and the Umberto Nahon Museum of Italian Jewish Art.

== Italian Rite Jews ==
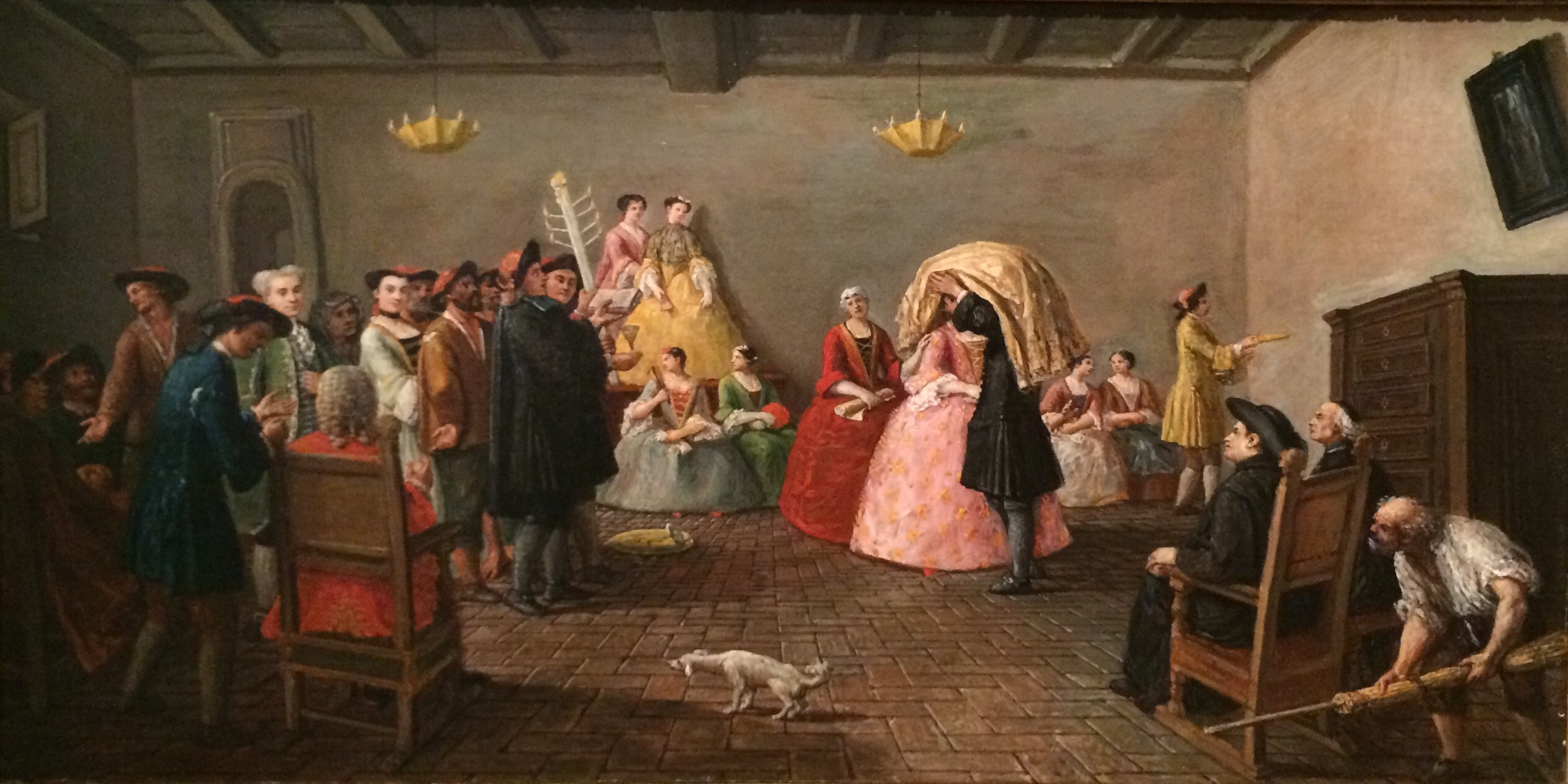
Jewish wedding in Venice, 1780 Musée d'Art et d'Histoire du Judaïsme

The Italian Rite community traditionally has used Italian Hebrew, a pronunciation system similar to that of conservative Iberian Jews.

=== Graeco-Italian Jews in Italy ===
The medieval pre-expulsion Jews of Southern Italy (the Jews of Apulia, Calabria, and Sicily) are often subsumed under the designation of "Italian Jews", and from a geographical point of view this is correct. In truth, however, Southern Italy, divided into the provinces of Sicily and the Catepanate of Italy, belonged to the Byzantine Empire till 1071. Accordingly, the medieval Jewish communities of Southern Italy were linguistically a part of the Yevanic area and as concerns customs and liturgy a part of the Romaniote area. Even after the Byzantine Empire had lost the Southern Italian provinces, the Kehillot in Apulia, Calabria and Sicily maintained connections to their coreligionists in Greece and Constantinople. Nevertheless, Jews in rural areas of Emirate of Sicily and Apulia are known to have made some use of Judeo-Arabic and Judeo-Latin languages in addition to Greek.

== Ashkenazi Jews in Italy ==
There have been Ashkenazi Jews living in the North of Italy since at least as early as the late Middle Ages. In Venice, they were the oldest Jewish community in the city, antedating both the Sephardic and the Italian groups. Following the invention of printing, Italy became a major publishing centre for Hebrew and Yiddish books for the use of German and other northern European Jews. A notable figure was Elijah Levita, who was an expert Hebrew grammarian and Masorete as well as the author of the Yiddish romantic epic Bovo-Bukh.

Another distinctive community was that of Asti, Fossano and Moncalvo, which was descended from Jews expelled from France in 1394: this community includes the well-known Lattes family. Only the Asti synagogue is still in use today. Their rite, known as Afam (from the Hebrew initials for those three cities), is similar to the Western Ashkenazic, but has some peculiarities drawn from the old French rite, particularly on the High Holy Days. These variations are found on loose-leaf sheets which the community used in conjunction with the normal Ashkenazi prayer-book; they are also printed by Goldschmidt. This rite was the only surviving descendant of the original French rite, as known to Rashi, used anywhere in the world: French Ashkenazim since 1394 have used the German-Ashkenazic rite. The rite died out in the 1950s.

In musical tradition and in pronunciation, Italian Ashkenazim differ considerably from the Ashkenazim of other countries, and show some assimilation to the other two communities. Exceptional are the north-eastern communities such as that of Gorizia, which date from Austro-Hungarian times and are much closer to the German and Austrian traditions.

== Sephardi Jews in Italy ==
Since 1442, when the Kingdom of Naples came under Spanish rule, considerable numbers of Sephardi Jews came to live in southern Italy. Following the expulsion of the Jews from Spain in 1492, from Portugal in 1495 and from the Kingdom of Naples in 1541, many moved to central and northern Italy. One famous refugee was Isaac Abarbanel.

Over the next few centuries they were joined by a steady stream of conversos leaving Spain and Portugal. In Italy they ran the risk of prosecution for Judaizing, given that in law they were baptized Christians; for this reason they generally avoided the Papal States. The popes did allow some Spanish-Jewish settlement at Ancona, as this was the main port for the Turkey trade, in which their links with the Ottoman Sephardim were useful. Other states found it advantageous to allow the conversos to settle and mix with the existing Jewish communities, and to turn a blind eye to their religious status; while in the next generation, the children of conversos could be brought up as fully Jewish with no legal problem, as they had never been baptized.

The main places of settlement were as follows.

1. Venice. The Venetian Republic often had strained relations with the Papacy; on the other hand they were alive to the commercial advantages offered by the presence of educated Spanish-speaking Jews, especially for the Turkey trade. Previously the Jews of Venice were tolerated under charters for a fixed term of years, periodically renewed. In the early 16th century these arrangements were made permanent, and a separate charter was granted to the "Ponentine" (western) community. The price paid for this recognition was the confinement of the Jews to the newly established Venetian Ghetto. Nevertheless, for a long time the Venetian Republic was regarded as the most welcoming state for Jews, equivalent to the Netherlands in the 17th century or the United States in the 20th century.
2. Sephardic immigration was also encouraged by the Este princes, in their possessions of Reggio, Modena and Ferrara (these cities also had established Italian-rite and Ashkenazi communities). In 1598, following the extinction of the male line of d'Este dukes of Ferrara, that city was repossessed by the Papal States, leading to some Jewish emigration from there (although overall the community survived as a distinct and significant entity up until the 20th century).
3. In 1593, Ferdinando I de' Medici, Grand Duke of Tuscany, granted Portuguese Jews charters to live and trade in Pisa and Livorno (see Jewish community of Livorno).

On the whole the Spanish and Portuguese Jews remained separate from the native Italian Jews, though there was considerable mutual religious and intellectual influence between the groups.

The Scola Spagnola of Venice was originally regarded as the "mother synagogue" for the Spanish and Portuguese community worldwide, as it was among the earliest to be established, and the first prayer book was published there: later communities, such as Amsterdam, followed its lead on ritual questions. With the decline in the importance of Venice in the 18th century, the leading role passed to Livorno (for Italy and the Mediterranean) and Amsterdam (for western countries). The Livorno synagogue was destroyed in the Second World War: a modern building was erected in 1958–1962.

In addition to Spanish and Portuguese Jews strictly so called, Italy has been host to many Sephardi Jews from the eastern Mediterranean. Dalmatia and many of the Greek islands, where there were large Jewish communities, were for several centuries part of the Venetian Republic, and there was a "Levantine" community in Venice. This remained separate from the "Ponentine" (i.e. Spanish and Portuguese) community and close to their eastern roots, as evidenced by their use in the early 18th century of a hymn book classified by maqam in the Ottoman manner (see Pizmonim). (Today both synagogues are still in use, but the communities have amalgamated.) Later on the community of Livorno acted as a link between the Spanish and Portuguese and the eastern Sephardic Jews and as a clearing house of musical and other traditions between the groups. Many Italian Jews today have "Levantine" roots, for example in Corfu, and before the Second World War Italy regarded the existence of the eastern Sephardic communities as a chance to expand Italian influence in the Mediterranean.

In the 18th and 19th centuries, many Italian Jews (mostly but not exclusively from the Spanish and Portuguese group) maintained a trading and residential presence in both Italy and countries in the Ottoman Empire: even those who settled permanently in the Ottoman Empire retained their Tuscan or other Italian nationality, so as to have the benefit of the Ottoman Capitulations. Thus in Tunisia there was a community of Juifs Portugais, or L'Grana (Livornese), separate from, and regarding itself as superior to, the native Tunisian Jews (Tuansa). Smaller communities of the same kind existed in other countries, such as Syria, where they were known as Señores Francos, though they generally were not numerous enough to establish their own synagogues, instead meeting for prayer in each other's houses. European countries often appointed Jews from these communities as their consular representatives in Ottoman cities.

Between the two World Wars Libya was an Italian colony and, as in other North African countries, the colonial power found the local Jews useful as an educated elite. Following Libyan independence, and especially after the Six-Day War in 1967, many Libyan Jews left either for Israel or for Italy, and today most of the "Sephardi" synagogues in Rome are in fact Libyan.

== Genetics ==
A 2000 genetic study by M. F. Hammer et al. found that the paternal haplogroups of Jews in Rome are of Middle Eastern origin with low level European admixture. A strong genetic connection between Jews in Rome and other Jewish populations from Europe, North Africa and the Middle East was noted. According to the study, the results suggest that modern Jews "descend from a common Middle Eastern ancestral population".

A 2010 study on Jewish ancestry by Atzmon and Ostrer et al. stated "Two major groups were identified by principal component, phylogenetic, and identity by descent (IBD) analysis: Middle Eastern Jews and European/Syrian Jews. The IBD segment sharing and the proximity of European Jews to each other and to southern European populations suggested similar origins for European Jewry and refuted large-scale genetic contributions of Central and Eastern European and Slavic populations to the formation of Ashkenazi Jewry", as both groups – the Middle Eastern Jews and European/Syrian Jews – shared common ancestors in the Middle East about 2500 years ago. The study examines genetic markers spread across the entire genome and shows that the Jewish groups share large swaths of DNA, indicating close relationships and that each of the Jewish groups in the study (Iranian, Iraqi, Syrian, Greek, Italian, Turkish and Ashkenazi) has its own genetic signature but is more closely related to the other Jewish groups than to their fellow non-Jewish countrymen. Ashkenazi, Italian, and Sephardi Jews were all found to share Middle Eastern and Southern European ancestry. Atzmon–Ostrer's team found that the SNP markers in genetic segments of 3 million DNA letters or longer were 10 times more likely to be identical among Jews than non-Jews. It is suggested that Sephardi, Ashkenazi and Italian Jews commonly descend from a group of Jews from the Middle East who, having migrated to Italy, intermarried with Italians during the Roman era. The ancestors of Ashkenazi Jews are then thought to have left Italy for Central Europe (and from there eventually Eastern Europe), with the ancestors of Italkic Jews remaining in Italy.

The results of a 2013 study by Behar et al. showed that Italian Jews show genetic connection to Sephardic, North African and Ashkenazic Jewish groups, Italians and Cypriots and Middle Eastern populations.

== Culture ==
Italian Jewish culture has flourished through the passage of time, with tradition regarding Italian Jewish identity, and transformations to the lives of those in Italian Jewish communities. With the spread of Jewish settlement throughout Italy came the eventual pride for the country of Italy, and the opportunities that arose to celebrate both cultures.

Italian Jewish food tradition is an identifiable part of their culture that has made an impact to this day on culinary tradition. Italian Jews maintained means of kosher within the context of their culinary traditions at home. The unique aspect of how they maintained kosher is that each individual family followed kosher within their own unique standard. Some Italian Jews ate pork, while others refrained, but would instead eat rabbit. Not only did this allow for new traditions to be established, kosher also maintained different meanings established in every household. Additionally, Italian Jewish households would enjoy meals that blended the culinary traditions of both Italians and Jews. One popular tradition that came to be within culinary tradition was the preparing of goose salami for Passover. These various culinary traditions made their way into restaurants and specialty markets, eventually to be seen in the newspapers. This led to widespread support for the Italian Jewish food tradition and the transformation of it through the years, many of which tradition can be found in cookbooks and passed along through generations of Italian Jewish families.

Northern Italy was a location in which Ashkenazi Jews came to establish Italian Jewish food traditions. Another significant aspect of this tradition was observing the religious ways of challah, from its ingredients, to its preparation, to the very moment it is shared amongst those gathered. With that said, the passage of time allowed for the transformation of such traditions to remain in respect to Ashkenazi Jews, while continuing to grow in food tradition and expand throughout Italy.

== See also ==
- History of the Jews in Italy
  - History of the Jews in Apulia
  - History of the Jews in Calabria
  - History of the Jews in Livorno
  - History of the Jews in Naples
  - History of the Jews in the Roman Empire
  - History of the Jews in Rome
  - History of the Jews in Sardinia
  - History of the Jews in Sicily
  - History of the Jews in Trieste
  - History of the Jews in Turin
  - History of the Jews in Venice
- List of Italian Jews
- Israel–Italy relations
- Jews of San Nicandro
- Italian Nusach
