= History of the Jews in Italy =

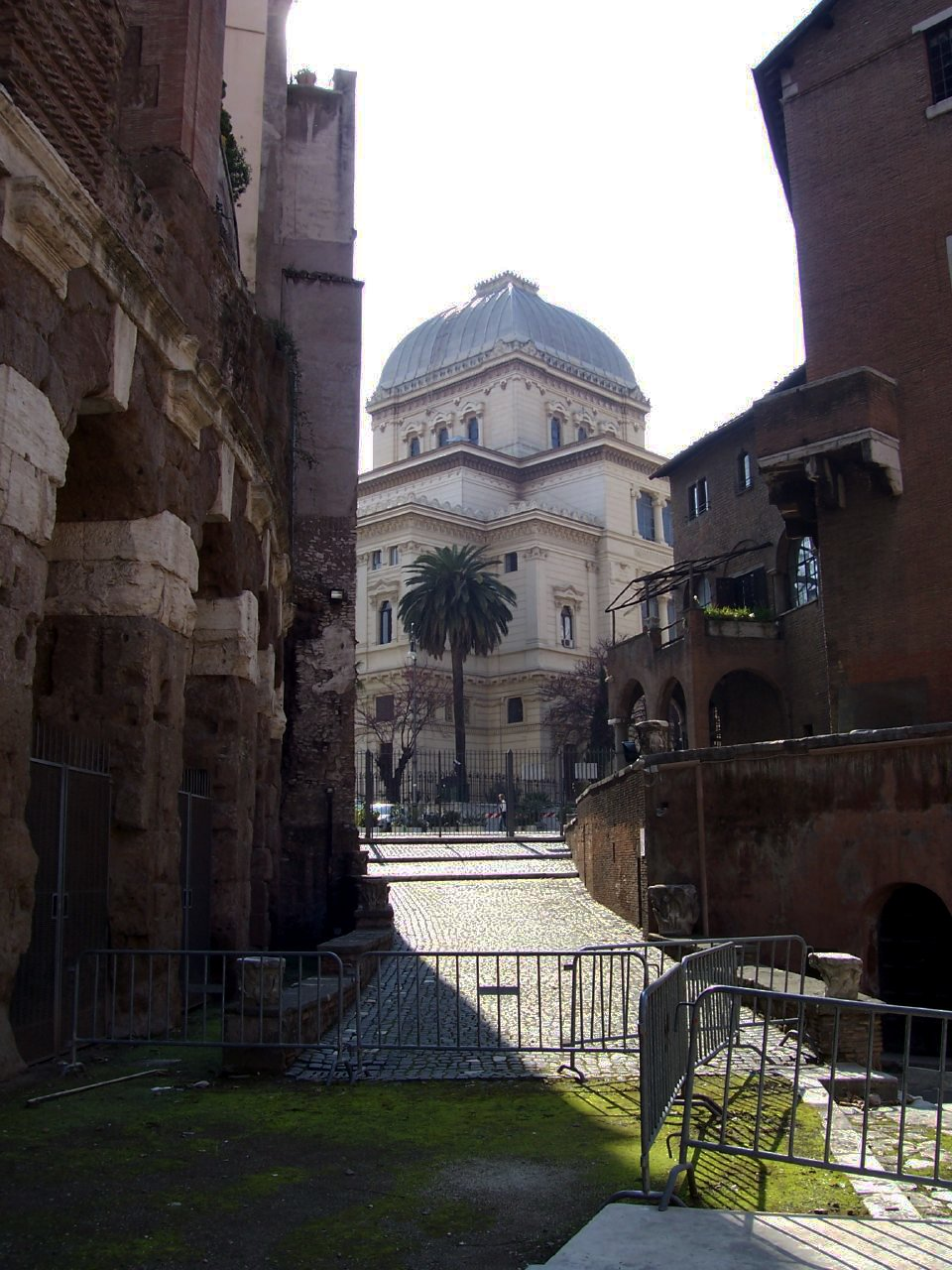
The Great Synagogue of Rome

The history of the Jews in Italy spans more than two thousand years to the present. The Jewish presence in Italy dates to the pre-Christian Roman period and has continued, despite periods of extreme persecution and expulsions, until the present. As of 2019, the estimated core Jewish population in Italy numbers around 45,000. In 2023, the Center for Studies of New Religions estimated the total at 36,000 while the Union of Italian Jewish Communities put the number at 27,000.

== Early Jewish presence ==
The Jewish community in Rome is likely one of the oldest continuous Jewish communities in the world, existing from classical times until today. Most certainly, it is known that in 139 BCE, Simon Maccabeus sent a Hasmonean embassy to Rome in order to strengthen his alliance with the Roman Republic against the Hellenistic Seleucid kingdom. The ambassadors received a cordial welcome from their coreligionists already established in Rome.

Large numbers of Jews even lived in Rome during the late Roman Republican period (from around 150 BCE). They were largely Greek-speaking and poor. As Rome had increasing contact with and military/trade dealings with the Greek-speaking Levant, during the 2nd and 1st centuries BCE, many Greeks, as well as Jews, came to Rome as merchants or were brought there as slaves. In Aquileia, a first century BC inscription mentions a freedman named Lucius Aiacius Dama, possibly originating from Damascus, who describes himself as a "Iudaeus", a Jew. The Lucilii Gamalae, a prominent Ostian family, have been suggested to descend from a slave from Gamla who took the cognomen Gamala from his city of origin, perhaps arriving in Italy as early as Pompey's conquest of Judaea in 63 BCE.

The Romans appear to have viewed the Jews as followers of peculiar, backward religious customs, but antisemitism as it would come to be in the Christian and Islamic worlds did not exist (see Anti-Judaism in the pre-Christian Roman Empire). Despite their disdain, the Romans did recognize and respect the antiquity of the Jews' religion and the fame of their Temple in Jerusalem (Herod's Temple). Many Romans did not know much about Judaism, including the emperor Augustus who, according to his biographer Suetonius, thought that Jews fasted on the sabbath. Julius Caesar was known as a great friend to the Jews, and they were among the first to mourn his assassination.

In Rome, the community was highly organized, and presided over by heads called άρχοντες (archontes) or γερουσιάρχοι (gerousiarchoi). The Jews maintained in Rome several synagogues, whose spiritual leader was called αρχισυνάγωγος (archisynagogos). Their tombstones, mostly in Greek with a few in Hebrew/Aramaic or Latin, were decorated with the ritual menorah (seven-branched candelabrum).

Some scholars have previously argued that Jews in the pre-Christian Roman Empire were active in proselytising Romans in Judaism, leading to an increasing number of outright converts. The new consensus is, that this is not the case. According to Erich S. Gruen, though conversions did happen, there is no evidence of Jews trying to convert Gentiles to Judaism. Leonard V. Rutgers has shown, on the basis of tomb counts in the Jewish Vigna Randanini and Villa Torlonia catacombs, that the Jewish community in third- and fourth-century Rome made up about one to two percent of the city’s population. It has also been argued that some people adopted some Jewish practices and belief in the Jewish God without actually converting (called God-fearers).

The fate of Jews in Rome and Italy fluctuated, with partial expulsions being carried out under the emperors Tiberius and Claudius.

== Following the Jewish–Roman Wars ==
After the First Jewish Revolt (66–73/74 CE) and the Bar Kokhba Revolt (132–136 CE), large numbers of Jews were brought from Judaea to Italy as slaves, in keeping with common Roman practice of enslaving prisoners of war and populations of defeated peoples. As a result, most of the Jewish population in Italy in the following period is thought to have originated from these captives.

The presence of Jewish slaves in Italy following the First Jewish–Roman War is documented in multiple sources: a funerary inscription from Puteoli, near Naples, dating to 70–95 CE, refers to a Jerusalem-born captive woman named Claudia Aster. Her name is believed to derive from the biblical figure, Esther. The Roman poet Martial, writing in the late 1st century CE, mentions a Jewish slave in his work who is described as originating from "Jerusalem destroyed by fire." A graffiti from Pompeii and other cities in Campania attest to their arrival. Some individuals appearing in Roman records with the family name Flavius may have been descendants of freed Jewish captives who adopted their liberators' name. The city of Rome itself received a considerable number of Jewish captives who were enslaved.

The revolts also caused increasing official hostility from the reign of Vespasian onwards. The most serious measure was the Fiscus Judaicus, which was a tax payable by all Jews in the Roman Empire. The new tax replaced the tithe that had formerly been sent to the Temple in Jerusalem (destroyed by the Romans in 70 CE), and was used instead in the temple of Jupiter Optimus Maximus in Rome.

In addition to Rome, there were a significant number of Jewish communities in southern Italy during this period. For example, the regions of Sicily, Calabria, and Apulia had well established Jewish populations.

From the second to fourth centuries CE epitaphs along the Appian Way feature honorific titles that center on Torah observance. The interred were commemorated as philonomos (lover of the Law), nomomathes (student of the Law), nomodidaskolos (teacher of the Law), philentolos (lover of the Commandments), and philolaos (lover of the people). One unnamed epitaph features the formula from Proverbs, "the memory of the righteous is a blessing." while multiple inscriptions close with the phrase "sleeps in peace with the righteous," suggesting a belief that a life of Torah observance leads to a blessed afterlife. From the Via Portuensis, an early 2nd century Latin plaque commemorates a woman named Regina as "obedient to the Law," and a bilingual Latin and Greek epitaph records a woman named Victorina, described as righteous, holy, and a lover of the commandments; her stone is adorned with a menorah, etrog and shofar. A sarcophagus from the Via Nomentana records that Julia Irene Arista was a woman "filled with the virtue of God and the faith of the chosen people, who observed the Laws exactly." Outside Rome, a Greek metrical epitaph from Lorium commemorates a man named Rufinus as a god-fearer learned in the holy Laws and wisdom, while a 3rd-century inscription from Ostia records the construction of a synagogue and an ark for the holy Law by a man named Mindius Faustus.

== Late antiquity ==
In late antiquity, Jewish communities in Italy were dispersed across both urban and rural areas. Archaeological discoveries, such as Jewish epitaphs and catacombs, reveal significant Jewish mobility. Jews arrived in Italy from both the Levant and various diaspora communities. The city of Rome, for instance, attracted Jewish migrants from multiple regions, including Sicily, Italy, and the Eastern Mediterranean. Naples, Milan, and Sicily also hosted Jewish communities with diverse origins. For example, Naples saw the immigration of Jews from Venafrum, Rome, Caesarea (likely Caesarea Maritima), and Mauretania, while Milan received Jews from Alexandria. Sicily hosted Jewish migrants from Egypt, and in Venosa, Jews from Lecce and Albania were interred.

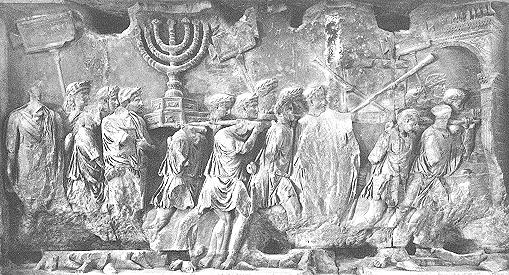
The treasures of Jerusalem (detail from the Arch of Titus).

With the promotion of Christianity as a legal religion of the Roman Empire by Constantine in 313 (the Edict of Milan), the position of Jews in Italy and throughout the empire declined rapidly and dramatically. Constantine established oppressive laws for the Jews; but these were in turn abolished by Julian the Apostate, who showed his favor toward the Jews to the extent of permitting them to resume their plan for the reconstruction of the Temple at Jerusalem. This concession was withdrawn under his successor, who, again, was a Christian; and then the oppression grew considerably. Nicene Christianity was adopted as the state church of the Roman Empire in 380, shortly before the fall of the Western Roman Empire.

Among the early archaeological finds of a Jewish community in Sicily is a 4th-century funerary inscription discovered in Catania. This text is the longest Latin documentary inscription from the Jewish Diaspora of that period. It commemorates a man named Aurelius Samohil and incorporates both Latin and Hebrew elements, including depictions of the menorah and a Hebrew greeting. The inscription requests respect for the Patriarchs and the Jewish Laws, and it has been cited by scholars as a rare instance of a Jewish individual combining secular and Jewish dating systems. The reference to the Patriarchs is believed to acknowledge the contemporary office of the Nasi, the rabbinic ethnarch of the Jewish population in Syria Palaestina. From the late 4th and 5th centuries CE, additional epitaphs from Catania commemorate presbyters named Irenaeus and Jason, noting that the deceased "did not offend the Law."

At the time of the foundation of the Ostrogothic rule under Theodoric (493–526), there were flourishing communities of Jews in Rome, Milan, Genoa, Palermo, Messina, Agrigentum, and in Sardinia. The Popes of the period were not seriously opposed to the Jews; and this accounts for the ardor with which the latter took up arms for the Ostrogoths as against the forces of Justinian—particularly at Naples, where the remarkable defense of the city was maintained almost entirely by Jews. After the failure of the various attempts to make Italy a province of the Byzantine Empire, the Jews had to suffer much oppression from the Exarch of Ravenna; but it was not long until the greater part of Italy came into the possession of the Lombards (568-774), under whom they lived in peace. Indeed, the Lombards passed no exceptional laws relative to the Jews. Even after the Lombards embraced Catholicism the condition of the Jews was always favourable, because the popes of that time not only did not persecute them, but guaranteed them more or less protection. Pope Gregory I was the first to issue the letter of protection to the Jews, which became known as Sicut Judaeis and was reissued several times in the later Middle Ages. Gregory I also intervened on behalf of the Jews of Sicily after having been petitioned by the Jewish community in Rome petitioned Gregory to rectify an unfair situation. Under succeeding popes the condition of the Jews did not grow worse; and the same was the case in the several smaller states into which Italy was divided. Both popes and states were so absorbed in continual external and internal dissensions that the Jews were left in peace. In every individual state of Italy a certain amount of protection was granted to them. The fact that the historians of this period scarcely make mention of the Jews, suggests that their circumstances were tolerable.

== Middle Ages ==
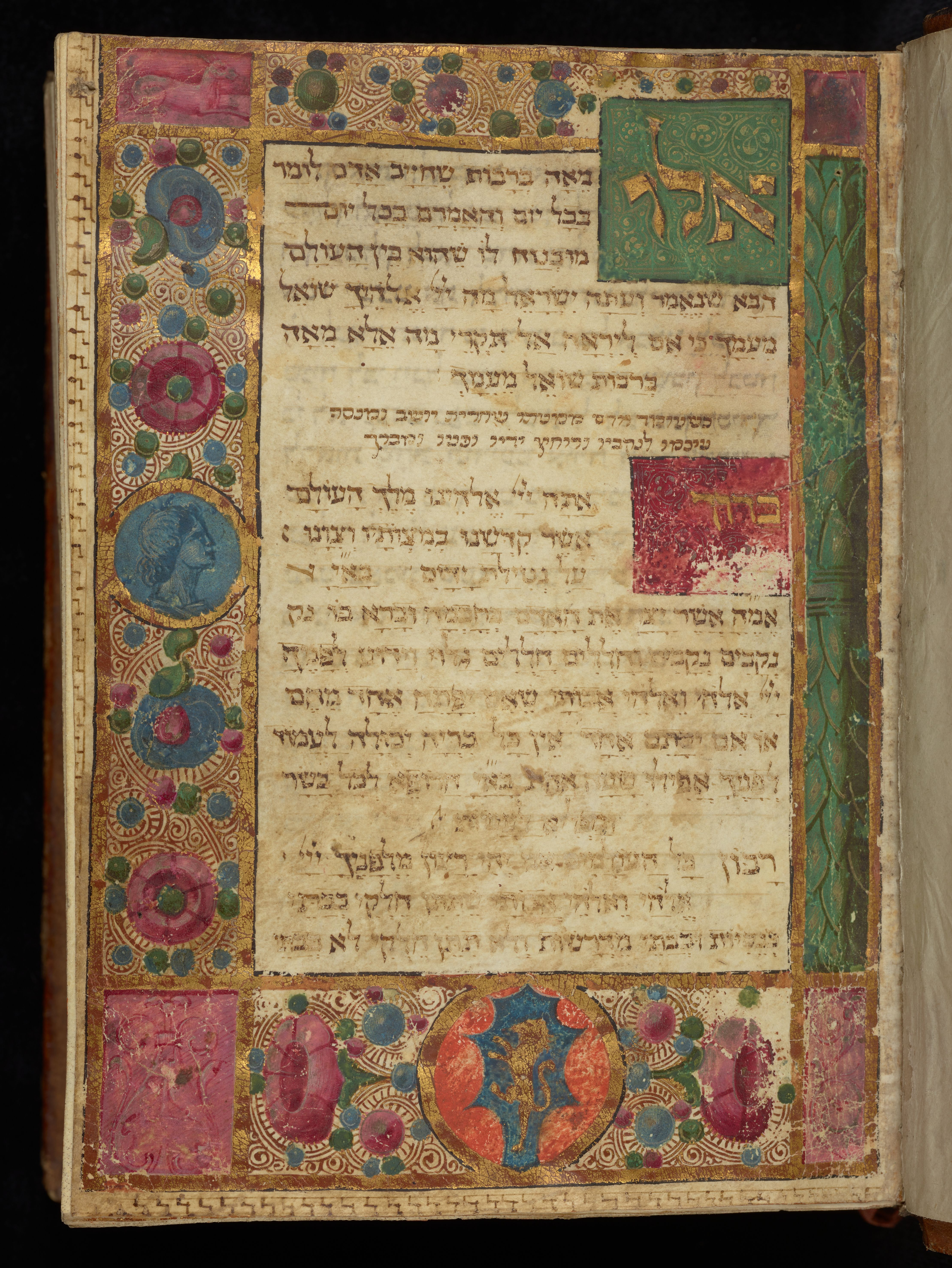
Machzor written on parchment in Hebrew in an Italian square script and dated to the 14th or 15th century. Chester Beatty Library

Italy, as most of Mediterranean Latin Christendom, offered a more hospitable environment to Jews than Northern Europe. They were less segregated from Christians and allowed some other professions except money lending. Mark R. Cohen attributes this to the continuity of Roman legal traditions, the survival of urban societies from Roman times of which Jews were an organic part and the lower degree of political unification. Especially the Jews of Rome enjoyed the special protection and connection to the papacy and was on occasion asked for guidance and assistance by other Jewish communities all over Europe. Throughout the Middle Ages, the Papal States were one of the few areas of medieval Europe from which Jews were never expelled.

Some expulsions happened, however, in other parts of Italy, such as in Bologna in 1172, as well as forced conversions: in Trani in 1380 there were four synagogues, transformed into churches at the time of Charles III of Naples, while 310 local Jews were forced to be baptized. A nephew of Rabbi Nathan ben Jehiel acted as administrator of the property of Pope Alexander III, who showed his amicable feelings toward the Jews at the Lateran Council of 1179. He defeated the designs of hostile prelates who advocated anti-Jewish laws. Under Norman rule, the Jews of southern Italy and of Sicily enjoyed even greater freedom; they were considered the equals of Christians, and were permitted to follow any career. They also had jurisdiction over their own affairs. The canonical laws against the Jews were more frequently disregarded in Italy than in any other country or region. A later pope—either Nicholas IV (1288–1292) or Boniface VIII (1294–1303)—had a Jewish physician, Isaac ben Mordecai, nicknamed Maestro Gajo.

=== Literary achievement ===
Among the early Jews of Italy who left written manuscripts was Shabbethai Donnolo (died 982). Two centuries later (1150), poets Shabbethai ben Moses of Rome; his son Jehiel Kalonymus, once regarded as a Talmudic authority even beyond Italy; and Rabbi Jehiel of the Mansi (Anaw) family, also of Rome, became known for their works. Nathan, son of the above-mentioned Rabbi Jehiel, was the author of a Talmudic lexicon ("'Aruk") that became the key to the study of the Talmud.

During his residence at Salerno, Solomon ben Abraham ibn Parhon compiled a Hebrew dictionary. This encouraged Italian Jews to study Biblical exegesis. On the whole, however, Hebrew literary culture was not flourishing. The only liturgical author of merit was Joab ben Solomon, some of whose compositions are extant.

Toward the second half of the 13th century, signs appeared of a better Hebrew culture and of a more profound study of the Talmud. Isaiah di Trani the Elder (1232–1279), a high Talmudic authority, wrote many celebrated responsa. David, his son, and Isaiah di Trani the Younger, his nephew, followed in his footsteps, as did their descendants until the end of the seventeenth century. Meïr ben Moses presided over an important Talmudic school in Rome, and Abraham ben Joseph over one in Pesaro. In Rome two famous physicians, Abraham and Jehiel, descendants of Nathan ben Jehiel, taught the Talmud. Paola dei Mansi, one of the women of this gifted family, also attained distinction; she had considerable knowledge of the Bible and Talmud, and she transcribed Biblical commentaries in a notably beautiful handwriting (see Jew. Encyc. i. 567, s.v. Paola Anaw).

During this period, the Holy Roman Emperor Frederick II, the last of the Hohenstaufen, employed Jews to translate from the Arabic philosophical and astronomical treatises. Among the translators were Judah ben Solomon ha-Kohen of Toledo, later of Tuscany, and Jacob Anatoli of Provence. This encouragement naturally led to the study of the works of Maimonides—particularly of the "Moreh Nebukim"—the favorite writer of Hillel of Verona (1220–1295). This last-named litterateur and philosopher practised medicine at Rome and in other Italian cities, and translated several medical works into Hebrew. The liberal spirit of the writings of Maimonides had other votaries in Italy; e.g., Shabbethai ben Solomon of Rome and Zerahiah Ḥen of Barcelona, who migrated to Rome and contributed much to spread the knowledge of his works. The effect of this on the Italian Jews was apparent in their love of freedom of thought and their esteem for literature, as well as in their adherence to the literal rendering of the Biblical texts and their opposition to fanatical cabalists and mystic theories. Among other devotees of these theories was Immanuel ben Solomon of Rome, the celebrated friend of Dante Aligheri. The discord between the followers of Maimonides and his opponents wrought most serious damage to the interests of Judaism.

The rise of poetry in Italy at the time of Dante influenced the Jews also. The rich and the powerful, partly by reason of sincere interest, partly in obedience to the spirit of the times, became patrons of Jewish writers, thus inducing the greatest activity on their part. This activity was particularly noticeable at Rome, where a new Jewish poetry arose, mainly through the works of Leo Romano, translator of the writings of Thomas Aquinas and author of exegetical works of merit; of Judah Siciliano, a writer in rimed prose; of Kalonymus ben Kalonymus, a famous satirical poet; and especially of the above-mentioned Immanuel. On the initiative of the Roman community, a Hebrew translation of Maimonides' Arabic commentary on the Mishnah was made. At this time Pope John XXII was on the point of pronouncing a ban against the Jews of Rome. The Jews instituted a day of public fasting and of prayer to appeal for divine assistance. King Robert of Sicily, who favored the Jews, sent an envoy to the pope at Avignon, who succeeded in averting this great peril. Immanuel himself described this envoy as a person of high merit and of great culture. This period of Jewish literature in Italy is indeed one of great splendor. After Immanuel there were no other Jewish writers of importance until Moses da Rieti (1388).

=== Worsening conditions in the High and Late Middle Ages ===
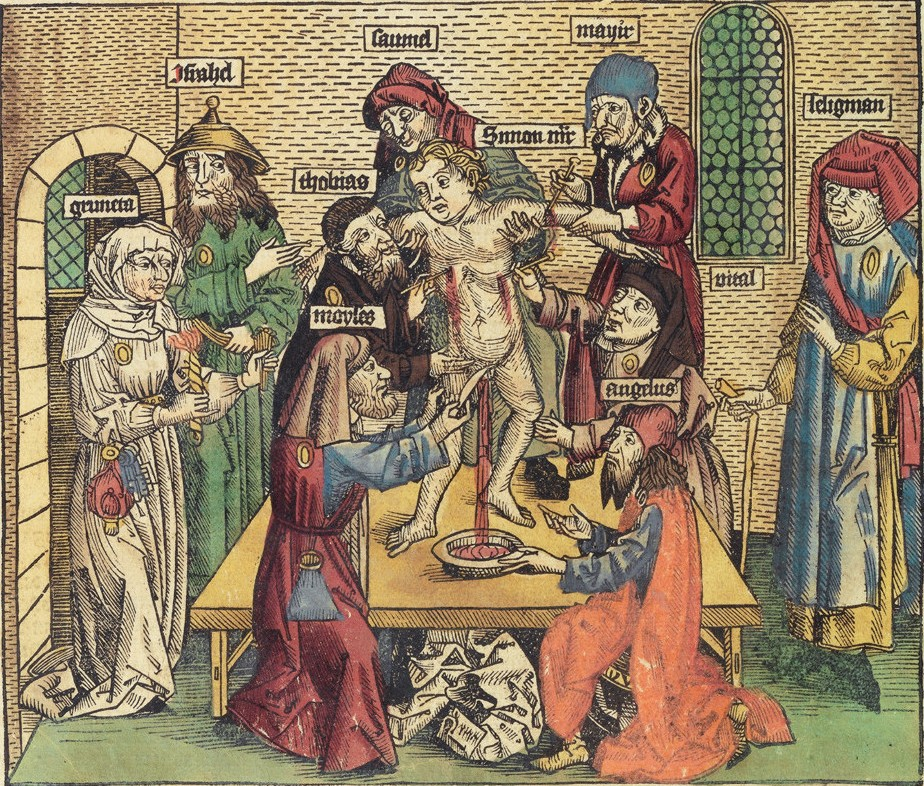
Simon of Trent blood libel. Illustration in Hartmann Schedel's Weltchronik, 1493

The position of Jews in Italy worsened considerably under Pope Innocent III (1198–1216). The Fourth Council of the Lateran, which he convened, exceeded the degree to which previous councils had regulated Jewish life. These constitutions condemned Jewish usury, ordered Jews to pay the tithe, ordered Jews (and Muslims) to wear distinguishing garb (as was common in Muslim countries), reiterated the prohibition of Jews to hold public office and stated that converts from Judaism must not reconvert. Nevertheless, though Innocent III was disturbed by the Jewish presence in the Christian society, he insisted on the Church's traditional teaching that the Jews had a special part in the divine plan and were therefore to be protected.

In 1235 Pope Gregory IX published the first bull against the ritual murder accusation. Other popes followed his example, particularly Innocent IV in 1247, Gregory X in 1272, Clement VI in 1348, Gregory XI in 1371, Martin V in 1422, Nicholas V in 1447, Sixtus V in 1475, Paul III in 1540, and later Alexander VII, Clement XIII, and Clement XIV.

=== Antipope Benedict XIII ===
The Jews suffered much from the relentless persecutions of the Avignon-based antipope Benedict XIII. They hailed his successor, Martin V, with delight. The synod convoked by the Jews at Bologna, and continued at Forlì, sent a deputation with costly gifts to the new pope, praying him to abolish the oppressive laws promulgated by Benedict and to grant the Jews those privileges which had been accorded them under previous popes. The deputation succeeded in its mission, but the period of grace was short; for Martin's successor, Eugenius IV, at first favorably disposed toward the Jews, ultimately reenacted all the restrictive laws issued by Benedict. In Italy, however, his bull was generally disregarded. The great centers, such as Venice, Florence, Genoa, and Pisa, realized that their commercial interests were of more importance than the affairs of the spiritual leaders of the Church; and accordingly the Jews, many of whom were bankers and leading merchants, found their condition better than ever before. It thus became easy for Jewish bankers to obtain permission to establish banks and to engage in monetary transactions. Indeed, in one instance even the Bishop of Mantua, in the name of the pope, accorded permission to the Jews to lend money at interest. Much of the banking negotiations of Tuscany were in the hands of a Jew, Jehiel of Pisa. The influential position of this successful financier was of the greatest advantage to his coreligionists at the time of the exile from Spain.

The Jews were also successful as skilled medical practitioners. William of Portaleone, physician to King Ferdinand I of Naples, and to the ducal houses of Sforza and Gonzaga, was one of the ablest of that time. He was the first of the long line of illustrious physicians in his family.

== Early modern period ==
It is estimated that in 1492 Jews made up between 3% and 6% of the population of Sicily. Many Sicilian Jews first went to Calabria, which already had a Jewish community since the 4th century. In 1524 Jews were expelled from Calabria, and in 1540 from the entire Kingdom of Naples, as all these areas fell under Spanish rule and were subject to the edict of expulsion by the Spanish Inquisition.

Throughout the 16th century, Jews gradually moved from the south of Italy to the north, with conditions worsening for Jews in Rome after 1556 and the Venetian Republic in the 1580s. Many Jews from Venice and the surrounding area migrated to the Polish–Lithuanian Commonwealth at this time.

=== Refugees from Spain ===
When Jews were expelled from Spain in 1492, many of them found refuge in Italy, where they were given protection by King Ferdinand I of Naples. One of the refugees, Don Isaac Abravanel, even received a position at the Neapolitan court, which he retained under the succeeding king, Alfonso II. The Spanish Jews were also well received in Ferrara by Duke Ercole d'Este I and in Tuscany through the mediation of Jehiel of Pisa and his sons. But at Rome and Genoa they experienced all the vexations and torments that hunger, plague, and poverty bring with them, and they were forced to accept baptism to escape starvation. In a few cases, the refugees exceeded in number the Jews already domiciled, and thus gave the determining vote in matters of communal interest and in the direction of studies.

Popes Alexander VI to Clement VII were indulgent toward Jews, having more urgent matters to occupy them. After the 1492 expulsion of Jews from Spain, some 9,000 impoverished Spanish Jews arrived at the borders of the Papal States. Alexander VI welcomed them into Rome, declaring that they were "permitted to lead their life, free from interference from Christians, to continue in their own rites, to gain wealth, and to enjoy many other privileges." He similarly allowed the immigration of Jews expelled from Portugal in 1497 and from Provence in 1498.

The popes and many of the most influential cardinals openly violated one of the most severe enactments of the Council of Basel, namely, that prohibiting Christians from employing Jewish physicians; they even gave the latter positions at the papal court. The Jewish communities of Naples and of Rome received the greatest number of accessions; but many Jews passed on from these cities to Ancona, Venice, Calabria, and thence to Florence and Padua. Venice, imitating the odious measures of the German cities, assigned to the Jews a special quarter (ghetto).

=== Expulsion from Naples ===
The ultra-Catholic party tried with all the means at its disposal to introduce the Inquisition into the Neapolitan realm, then under Spanish rule. Charles V, upon his return from his victories in Africa, was on the point of exiling the Jews from Naples when Benvenida, wife of Samuel Abravanel, caused him to defer the action. A few years later, in 1533, a similar decree was proclaimed, but upon this occasion also Samuel Abravanel and others were able through their influence to avert for several years the execution of the edict. Many Jews repaired to the Ottoman Empire, some to Ancona, and still others to Ferrara, where they were received graciously by Duke Ercole II.

After the death of Pope Paul III (1534–1549), who had shown favor to the Jews, a period of strife, persecution, and despondency set in. A few years later the Jews were exiled from Genoa, among the refugees being Joseph Hakohen, physician to the doge Andrea Doria and eminent historian. Duke Ercole allowed the Marranos, driven from Spain and Portugal, to enter his dominions and to profess Judaism freely and openly. Samuel Usque, also a historian, who had fled from the Portuguese Inquisition, settled in Ferrara, and Abraham Usque founded a large printing establishment there. A third Usque, Solomon, merchant of Venice and Ancona and poet of some note, translated the sonnets of Petrarch into excellent Spanish verse, and this work was much admired by his contemporaries.

Although the return to Judaism of the Marrano Usques caused much rejoicing among the Italian Jews, this was counterbalanced by the deep grief into which they were plunged by the conversion to Christianity of two grandsons of Elijah Levita, Leone Romano and Vittorio Eliano. One became a canon of the Church; the other, a Jesuit. They heavily criticized the Talmud to Pope Julius III and the Inquisition; as a consequence the pope pronounced a sentence of destruction against this work, to the printing of which one of his predecessors, Leo X, had given his sanction. On the Jewish New Year Day (9 September) in 1553, all the copies of the Talmud in the principal cities of Italy, in the printing establishments of Venice, and even in the distant island of Candia (Crete), were burned. He was restrained from the execution of the scheme by Cardinal Alexander Farnese who succeeded in bringing to light the true culprit.

=== Paul IV ===
Marcellus' successor, Paul IV, confirmed all the bulls against the Jews issued up to that time and added more oppressive measures, including a variety of prohibitions designed to condemn Jews to abject misery, depriving them of the means of sustenance, and denying them the exercise of all professions. The papal bull Cum nimis absurdum of 1555 created the Roman ghetto and required the wearing of yellow badges. The Jews were also forced to labor at the restoration of the walls of Rome without any compensation.

Cum nimis absurdum limited each ghetto in the Papal States to one synagogue. In the early 16th century, there were at least seven synagogues across Rome, each serving as the house of worship for distinct demographic subgroup: Roman Jews (Benè Romì), Sicilian Jews, Italian Jews (that were neither Benè Romì nor Sicilian), German Ashkenazim, French Provençal, Castilian Sephardim, and Catalan Sephardim.

Many Jews abandoned Rome and Ancona and went to Ferrara and Pesaro. Here the Duke of Urbino welcomed them graciously in the hope of directing the extensive commerce of the Levant to the new port of Pesaro, which was, at that time, predominantly in the hands of the Jews of Ancona. Among the many who were forced to leave Rome was the Marano Amato Lusitano, a distinguished physician, who had often attended Pope Julius III. He had even been invited to become physician to the King of Poland, but had declined the offer in order to remain in Italy.

=== Expulsion from Papal States ===
Paul IV was followed by the tolerant pope Pius IV, who was succeeded by Pius V, who restored all the anti-Jewish bulls of his predecessors—not only in his own immediate domains, but throughout the Christian world. In Lombardy, the expulsion of the Jews was threatened, and, although this extreme measure was not put into execution, they were tyrannized in countless ways. At Cremona and at Lodi their books were confiscated. In Genoa, from which the Jews were expelled at this time, an exception was made in favor of Joseph Hakohen. In his Emek Habachah he narrates the history of these persecutions. He had no desire to take advantage of the exception, though, and went to Casale Monferrato, where he was graciously received even by the Christians. In this same year the pope directed his persecutions against the Jews of Bologna. Many of the wealthiest Jews were imprisoned and tortured to force false confessions from them. When Rabbi Ishmael Ḥanina was being racked, he declared that should the pains of torture elicit from him any words that might be construed as casting reflection on Judaism, they would be false and null. Jews were forbidden to leave the city, but many succeeded in escaping by bribing the watchmen at the gates of the ghetto and of the city. The fugitives, together with their wives and children, repaired to the neighboring city of Ferrara. Then Pius V decided to banish the Jews from all his dominions, and, despite the enormous loss which was likely to result from this measure, and the remonstrances of influential and well-meaning cardinals, the Jews (in all about 1,000 families) were actually expelled from all the Papal States excepting Rome and Ancona. A few became Christians. The majority found refuge in other parts of Italy, e.g. Leghorn and Pitigliano.

=== Approval within the Republic of Venice ===
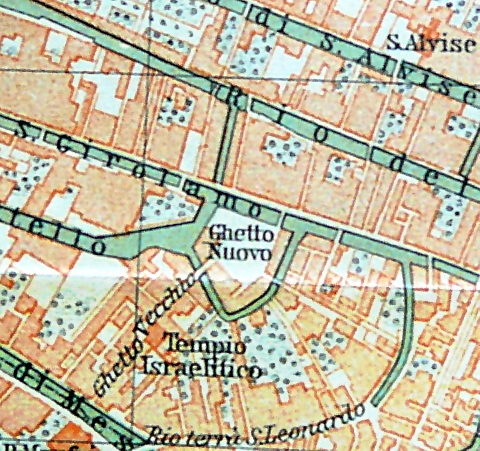
The Venetian Ghetto was abolished by Napoleon when he occupied the city in 1797

A great sensation was caused in Italy by the choice of a prominent Jew, Solomon of Udine, as Turkish ambassador to Venice who was selected to negotiate within that republic during July 1574. There was a pending decree of expulsion of the Jews by the leaders of several kingdoms within Italy, thereby making the Venetian Senate concerned if whether there would be difficulties collaborating with Solomon of Udine. However, through the influence of the Venetian diplomats themselves, and particularly of the Patrician, Marcantonio Barbaro of the noble Barbaro family, who esteemed Udine highly, Solomon was received with great honors at the Doge's Palace. In virtue of this, Udine received an exalted position within the Republic of Venice and was able to render great service to his coreligionists. Through his influence Jacob Soranzo, an agent of the Venetian Republic at Constantinople, came to Venice. Solomon was influential in having the decree of expulsion revoked within Italian kingdoms, and he furthermore obtained a promise from Venetian patricians that Jews would have a secure home within the Republic of Venice. Udine was eventually honored for his services and returned to Constantinople, leaving his son Nathan in Venice to be educated. Nathan was one of the first Jewish students to have studied at the University of Padua, under the inclusive admission policy established by Marcantonio Barbaro. The success of Udine inspired many Jews in the Ottoman Empire, particularly in Constantinople, where they had attained great prosperity.

=== Persecutions and confiscations ===
The position of the Jews of Italy at this time was pitiable; pope Paul IV and Pius V reduced them to the utmost humiliation and had materially diminished their numbers. In southern Italy there were almost none left; in each of the important communities of Rome, Venice, and Mantua there were about 2,000 Jews; while in all Lombardy there were hardly 1,000. Gregory XIII was not less fanatical than his predecessors; he noticed that, despite papal prohibition, Christians employed Jewish physicians; he therefore strictly prohibited the Jews from attending Christian patients, and threatened with the most severe punishment alike Christians who should have recourse to Hebrew practitioners, and Jewish physicians who should respond to the calls of Christians. Furthermore, the slightest assistance given to the Marranos of Portugal and Spain, in violation of the canonical laws, was sufficient to deliver the guilty one into the power of the Inquisition, which did not hesitate to condemn the accused to death. Gregory also induced the Inquisition to consign to the flames a large number of copies of the Talmud and of other Hebrew books. Special sermons, designed to convert the Jews, were instituted; and at these at least one-third of the Jewish community, men, women, and youths above the age of twelve, was forced to be present. The sermons were usually delivered by baptized Jews who had become friars or priests; and not infrequently the Jews, without any chance of protest, were forced to listen to such sermons in their own synagogues. These cruelties forced many Jews to leave Rome, and thus their number was still further diminished.

=== Varied fortunes ===
Under the following pope, Sixtus V (1585–1590), the condition of the Jews was somewhat improved. He repealed many of the regulations established by his predecessors, permitted Jews to reside in all parts of his realm, and gave Jewish physicians freedom to practice their profession. David de Pomis, an eminent physician, profited by this privilege and published a work in Latin, entitled De Medico Hebraeo, dedicated to Duke Francis of Urbino, in which he proved to the Jews their obligation to consider the Christians as brothers, to assist them, and to attend them. The Jews of Mantua, Milan, and Ferrara, taking advantage of the favorable disposition of the pope, sent to him an ambassador, Bezaleel Massarano, with a present of 2,000 scudi, to obtain from him permission to reprint the Talmud and other Jewish books, promising at the same time to expurgate all passages considered offensive to Christianity. Their demand was granted, partly through the support given by Lopez, a Marano, who administered the papal finances and who was in great favor with the pontiff. Scarcely had the reprinting of the Talmud been begun, and the conditions of its printing been arranged by the commission, when Sixtus died. His successor, Gregory XIV, was as well disposed to the Jews as Sixtus had been; but during his short pontificate he was almost always ill. Clement VIII (1592–1605), who succeeded him, renewed the anti-Jewish bulls of Paul IV and Pius V, and exiled the Jews from all his territories with the exception of Rome, Ancona, and Avignon; but, in order not to lose the commerce with the East, he gave certain privileges to the Turkish Jews. The exiles repaired to Tuscany, where they were favorably received by Duke Ferdinand dei Medici, who assigned to them the city of Pisa for residence, and by Duke Vincenzo Gonzaga, at whose court Joseph da Fano, a Jew, was a favorite. They were again permitted to read the Talmud and other Hebrew books, provided that they were printed according to the rules of censorship approved by Sixtus V. From Italy, where these expurgated books were printed by thousands, they were sent to the Jews of other various countries.

Giuseppe Ciante (d. 1670), a leading Hebrew expert of his day and professor of theology and philosophy at the College of Saint Thomas in Rome was appointed in 1640 by Pope Urban VIII to the mission of preaching to the Jews of Rome (Predicatore degli Ebrei) in order to promote their conversion." In the mid-1650s Ciantes wrote a "monumental bilingual edition of the first three Parts of Thomas Aquinas' Summa contra Gentiles, which includes the original Latin text and a Hebrew translation prepared by Ciantes, assisted by Jewish apostates, the Summa divi Thomae Aquinatis ordinis praedicatorum Contra Gentiles quam Hebraicè eloquitur.... Until the present this remains the only significant translation of a major Latin scholastic work in modern Hebrew."

=== In the ducal dominions ===
It was strange that under Philip II the Jews exiled from all parts of Spain were tolerated in the Duchy of Milan, then under Spanish rule. Such an inconsistency of policy was designed to work ill for the interests of the Jews. To avert this misfortune an eloquent ambassador, Samuel Coen, was sent to the king at Alessandria; but he was unsuccessful in his mission. The king, persuaded by his confessor, expelled the Jews from Milanese territory in the spring of 1597. The exiles, numbering about 1,000, were received at Mantua, Modena, Reggio, Verona, and Padua. The princes of the house of Este had always accorded favor and protection to the Jews, and were much beloved by them. Eleonora, a princess of this house, had inspired two Jewish poets; and when she was ill public prayers were said in the synagogues for her restoration to health. But misfortune overtook the Jews of Ferrara as well; for when Alfonso II, the last of the Este family, died, the Principality of Ferrara was incorporated in the dominions of the Church under Clement VIII, who decreed the banishment of the Jews. Aldobrandini, a relative of the pope, took possession of Ferrara in the pontiff's name. Seeing that the Jewish community was vital to the city's economic stability, he complied with their request for an exemption of five years from the decree, although this was much against the pope's wish.

The Mantuan Jews suffered seriously at the time of the Thirty Years' War. The Jews exiled from the papal dominions had repeatedly found refuge in Mantua, where the dukes of Gonzaga had accorded protection to them, as they had done to the Jews already resident there. The next to the last duke, although a cardinal, favored them sufficiently to enact a statute for the maintenance of order in the ghetto. After the death of the last of this house the right of succession was contested at the time of the Thirty Years' War, and the city was besieged by the German soldiery of Wallenstein. After a valiant defense, in which the Jews labored at the walls until the approach of the Sabbath, the city fell into the power of the besiegers, and for three days was at the mercy of fire and sword. The commander-in-chief, Altringer, forbade the soldiers to sack the ghetto, thereby hoping to secure the spoils for himself. The Jews were ordered to leave the city, taking with them only their personal clothing and three gold ducats per capita. There were retained enough Jews to act as guides to the places where their coreligionists were supposed to have hidden their treasures. Through three Jewish zealots these circumstances came to the knowledge of the emperor, who ordered the governor, Collalto, to issue a decree permitting the Jews to return and promising them the restoration of their goods. Only about 800, however, returned, the others having died.

The victories in Europe of the Turks, who brought their armies up to the very walls of Vienna in a 1683 siege, helped even in Italy to incite the Christian population against the Jews, who remained friendly to the Ottoman Empire. In Padua, in 1683, the Jews were in great danger because of the agitation fomented against them by the cloth-weavers. A violent tumult broke out; the lives of the Jews were seriously menaced; and it was only with the greatest difficulty that the governor of the city succeeded in rescuing them, in obedience to a rigorous order from Venice. For several days thereafter the ghetto had to be especially guarded.

== Reaction after Napoleon ==
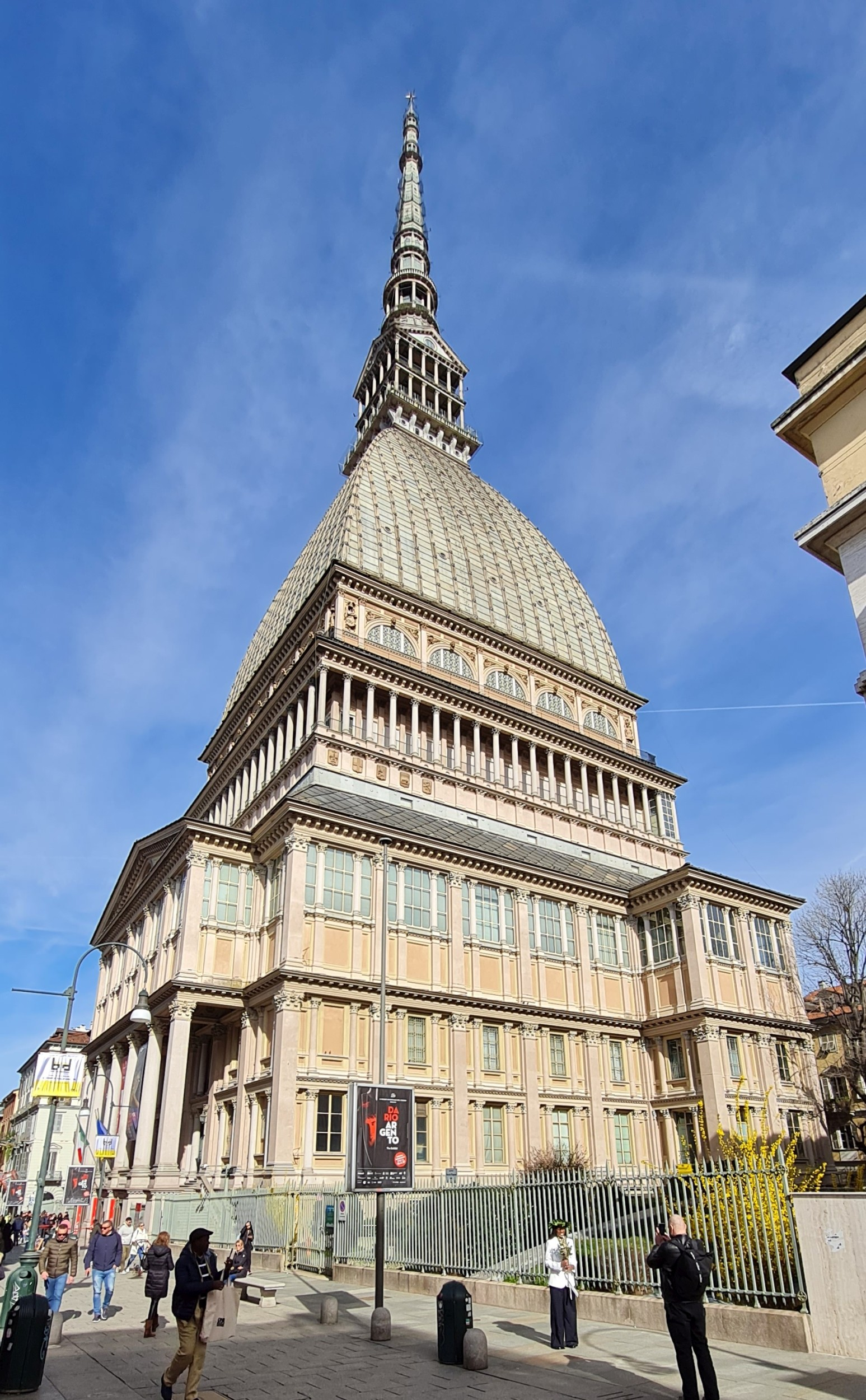
The Mole Antonelliana in Turin was conceived and constructed as a synagogue.

Among the first schools to adopt the Reform projects of Hartwig Wessely were those of Trieste, Venice, and Ferrara. Under the influence of the liberal religious policy of Napoleon I, the Jews of Italy, like those of France, were emancipated. The supreme power of the popes was broken: they no longer had time to give to framing anti-Jewish enactments, and they no longer directed canonical laws against the Jews.

To the Sanhedrin convened by Napoleon at Paris (1807), Italy sent four deputies: Abraham Vita de Cologna; Isaac Benzion Segre, rabbi of Vercelli; Graziadio Nepi, physician and rabbi of Cento; and Jacob Israel Karmi, rabbi of Reggio. Of the four rabbis assigned to the committee which was to draw up the answers to the twelve questions proposed to the Assembly of Notables, two, Cologna and Segre, were Italians, and were elected respectively first and second vice-presidents of the Sanhedrin. But the liberty acquired by the Jews under Napoleon was of short duration; it disappeared with his downfall.

Pope Pius VII, on regaining possession of his realms, reinstalled the Inquisition; he deprived the Jews of every liberty and confined them again in ghettos. Such became to a greater or less extent their condition in all the states into which Italy was then divided; in Rome they were again forced to listen to proselytizing sermons.

In the year 1829, consequent upon an edict of the Emperor Francis I, there was opened in Padua, with the cooperation of Venice, of Verona, and of Mantua, the first Italian rabbinical college, in which Lelio della Torre and Samuel David Luzzatto taught. Luzzatto was a man of great intellect; he wrote in pure Hebrew upon philosophy, history, literature, criticism, and grammar. Many distinguished rabbis came from the rabbinical college of Padua. Zelman, Moses Tedeschi, and Castiglioni followed at Trieste the purposes and the principles of Luzzatto's school. At the same time, Elijah Benamozegh, a man of great knowledge and the author of several works, distinguished himself in the old rabbinical school at Leghorn.

== Nineteenth century ==
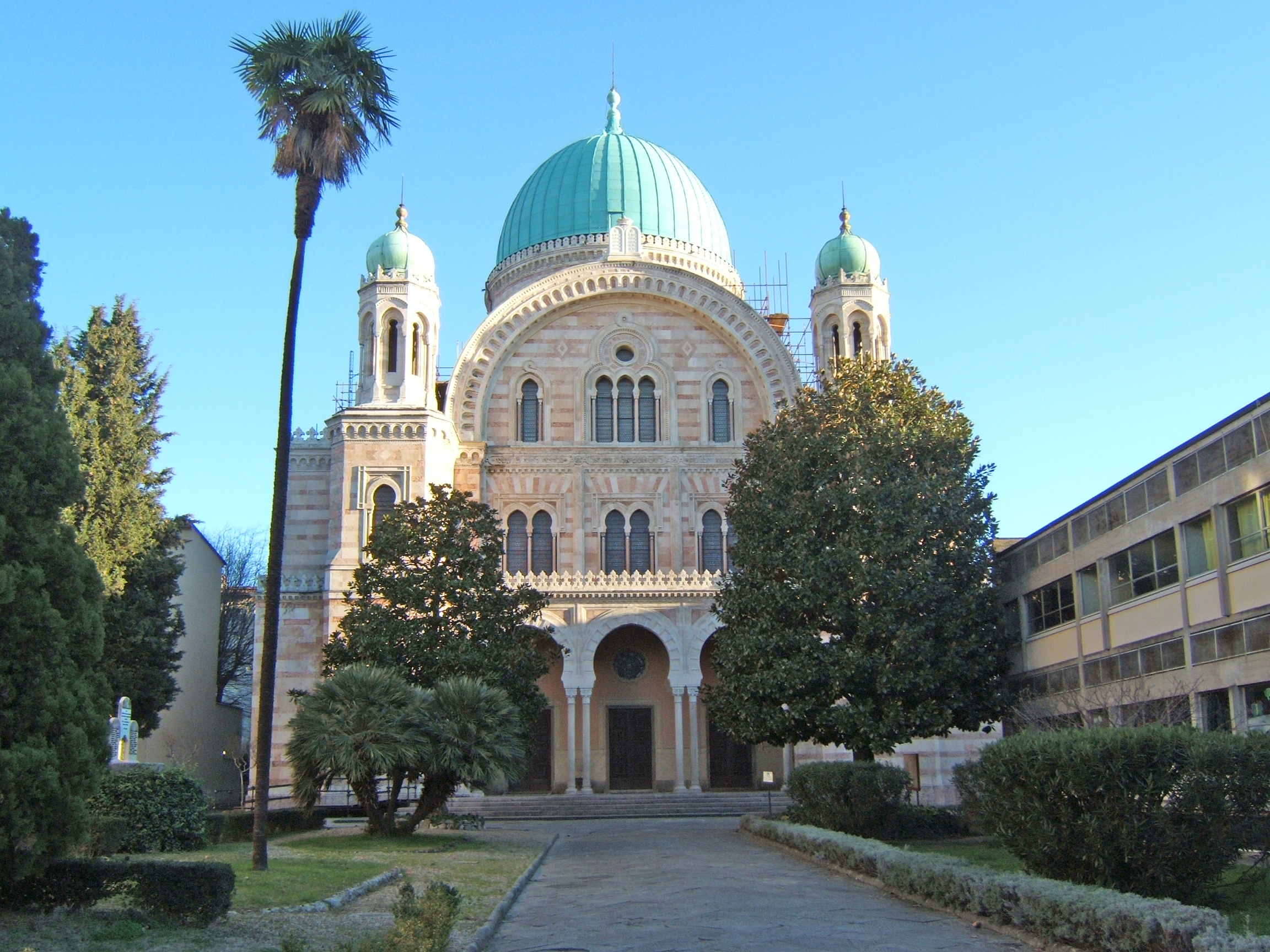
Great Synagogue of Florence, built in 1874–1882

The return to medieval servitude after the Italian restoration did not last long; and the Revolution of 1848, which convulsed all Europe, brought great advantages to the Jews. Although this was followed by restoration of the Papal States only four months later, in early 1849, yet the persecutions and the violence of past times had to a large extent disappeared. The last outrage against the Jews of Italy was connected with the case of Edgardo Mortara, which occurred in Bologna in 1858. In 1859 most of the papal states were annexed into the united Kingdom of Italy under King Victor Emanuel II. Except in and near Rome, where oppression lasted until the end of the papal dominion (20 September 1870), the Jews obtained full emancipation. In behalf of their country the Jews with great ardor sacrificed life and property in the memorable campaigns of 1859, 1866, and 1870. Of the many who deserve mention in this connection may be singled out Isacco Pesaro Maurogonato. He was minister of finance to the self-proclaimed Venetian Republic of San Marco (whose president, Daniele Manin came from a Jewish family that had converted to Christianity in 1759) during the war of 1848 against Austria, and his grateful country erected to him a memorial in bronze. Also erected in the palace of the doges there was a marble bust of Samuele Romanin, a celebrated Jewish historian of Venice. Florence, too, has commemorated a modern Jewish poet, Solomon Fiorentino, by placing a marble tablet upon the house in which he was born. The secretary and faithful friend of Count Cavour was the Piedmontese Isaac Artom; while L'Olper, later rabbi of Turin, and also the friend and counselor of Mazzini, was one of the most courageous advocates of Italian independence. The names of the Jewish soldiers who died in the cause of Italian liberty were placed along with those of their Christian fellow soldiers on the monuments erected in their honour.

== Twentieth century ==
=== Early twentieth century ===
Italian prime minister Luigi Luzzatti, who took office in 1910, was one of the world's first Jewish heads of government (not converted to Christianity). Another Jew, Ernesto Nathan served as mayor of Rome from 1907 to 1913. By 1902, out of 350 senators, there were six Jews. By 1920, there were nineteen Jewish senators.

Pope John Paul II gave access to some formerly secret Vatican Archives to scholars, one of whom, David Kertzer, used information thus obtained in his book The Popes Against the Jews. According to that book, in the late 19th and early 20th centuries, the popes and many Catholic bishops and Catholic publications consistently made a distinction between "good antisemitism" and "bad antisemitism". The "bad" kind directed hatred against Jews merely because of their descent. That was considered un-Christian, in part because the church held that its message was for all of mankind equally, and any person of any ancestry could become a Christian. The "good" kind denounced alleged Jewish plots to gain control of the world by controlling newspapers, banks, schools, etc., or otherwise attributed various evils to Jews. Kertzer's book details many instances in which Catholic publications denounced such alleged plots, and then, when criticized for inciting hatred of Jews, would remind people that the Catholic Church condemned the "bad" kind of antisemitism.

Approximately 5,000 Italian Jews were conscripted to the Royal Italian Army during World War I and about half of them served as officers (this was due to the average higher level of education among Italian Jews). About 420 were killed in action or went missing in action; about 700 received military decorations.

=== Jews during the Fascist era ===
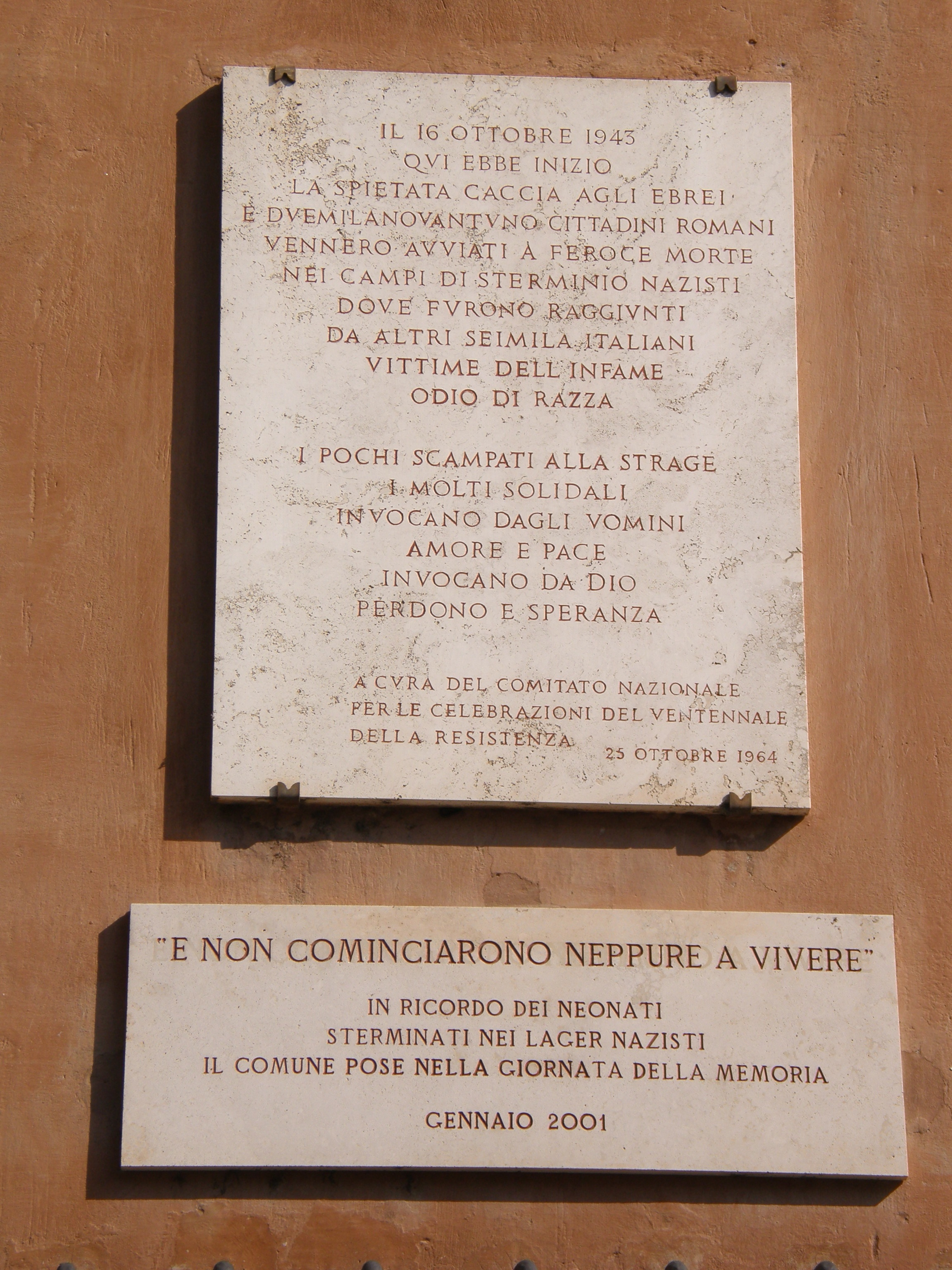
A Holocaust Memorial in Rome's Jewish ghetto

Jews fervently supported the Risorgimento, identified as Italian nationalists, proved valiant as soldiers in World War I, and, in terms of their relatively small numerical presence within the general population, they later went on to form a disproportionate part of the Fascist Party from its beginnings down to 1938.

In 1929, Mussolini acknowledged the contributions which Italian Jews had made to Italian society, despite their minority status, and he also believed that Jewish culture was Mediterranean, aligning his early opinion of Italian Jews with his early Mediterraneanist perspective. He also argued that Jews were natives of Italy, after living on the Italian Peninsula for a long period of time. In the early 1930s, Mussolini held discussions with Zionist leadership figures over proposals to encourage the emigration of Italian Jews to the mandate of Palestine, as Mussolini hoped that the presence of pro-Italian Jews in the region would weaken pro-British sentiment and potentially overturn the British mandate.

Until Benito Mussolini's alliance with Adolf Hitler, he had always denied any antisemitism within the National Fascist Party (PNF). In the early 1920s, Mussolini wrote an article which stated that Fascism would never elevate a "Jewish Question" and that "Italy knows no antisemitism and we believe that it will never know it" and then elaborated "let us hope that Italian Jews will continue to be sensible enough so as not to give rise to antisemitism in the only country where it has never existed". In 1932 during a conversation with Emil Ludwig, Mussolini described antisemitism as a "German vice" and stated: "There was 'no Jewish Question' in Italy and could not be one in a country with a healthy system of government". On several occasions, Mussolini spoke positively about Jews and the Zionist movement. Mussolini had initially rejected Nazi racism, especially the idea of a master race, as "arrant nonsense, stupid and idiotic".

Mussolini originally distinguished his position from Hitler's fanatical racism while affirming that he himself was a Zionist. More broadly, he even proposed building a mosque in Rome as a sign that Italy was the Protector of Islam, a move blocked by a horrified Pope. German propagandists often derided what they called Italy's "Kosher Fascism". There were however some Fascists, Roberto Farinacci and Giovanni Preziosi being prime examples, who held fringe and extremely racist views before Fascist Italy formed its alliance with Nazi Germany. Preziosi was the first to publish an Italian edition of the Protocols of the Elders of Zion, in 1921, which was published almost simultaneously with a version issued by Umberto Benigni in supplements to Fede e Ragione. However, the book had little impact until the mid-1930s.

It has also been indicated that Benito Mussolini had his own, if somewhat different from Nazism, brand of racist views. Mussolini attempted to reconcile the divisive racial discourse which had developed within the nation by asserting that he had already resolved the Southern question and as a result, he asserted that all Italians, not just Northerners, belonged to the "dominant race" which was the Aryan race.

Mussolini originally held the view that a small contingent of Italian Jews had lived in Italy "since the days of the Kings of Rome" (a reference to the Bené Roma) and as a result, they should "remain undisturbed". One of Mussolini's mistresses, Margherita Sarfatti, was Jewish. There were even some Jews in the National Fascist Party, such as Ettore Ovazza who founded the Jewish Fascist paper La Nostra Bandiera in 1935. Mussolini once declared "Anti-Semitism does not exist in Italy... Italians of Jewish birth have shown themselves good citizens and they fought bravely in [World War I]."

Despite the presence of a Fascist regime, some Jewish refugees considered Italy a safe haven in the first half of the 1930s. During that period, the country hosted up to 11,000 persecuted Jews, including 2,806 Jews who were of German descent. However, as early as 1934, Jewish personnel were removed from institutions and state organizations. 1934 also saw press campaigns against anti-fascist Jews, in which they were equated with Zionists. Between 1936 and 1938, the Fascist regime-endorsed anti-Semitic propaganda was mounting in the press and it was even mounting in graffiti. Equally, scholars of eugenetics, statistics, anthropology and demographics began to outline racist theories.

The anti-Semitic metamorphosis of Fascism culminated in the racial laws of 18 September 1938. Although they did not directly threaten Jewish lives, these laws excluded Jews from public education, the military and the government, and they also made it practically impossible for them to engage in most economic activities. Jews could not hire non-Jews. Marriages between Jews and non-Jews were also prohibited. Not all Italian Fascists supported discrimination: while the pro-German, anti-Jewish Roberto Farinacci and Giovanni Preziosi strongly pushed for them, Italo Balbo and Dino Grandi strongly opposed the Racial Laws. Balbo, in particular, regarded antisemitism as having nothing to do with fascism and staunchly opposed the antisemitic laws.

At least until the promulgation of the 1938 racial laws, a number of Italian Jews were sympathetic to the regime and occupied significant offices and positions in politics and economy. It is estimated that 230 Italian Jews participated in the October 1922 March on Rome that brought about Mussolini's ascent to power. The 1938 Italian census recorded 590 Jewish "old fighters" who had joined the National Fascist Party before its seizure of power in 1922.

Examples of Italian Jews that operated within the regime until the enactment of the racial laws include Giorgio Morpurgo (lieutenant colonel, staff officer of the Corpo Truppe Volontarie), Aldo Finzi, Renzo Ravenna (podestà of Ferrara and personal friend of Italo Balbo), Ettore Ovazza and Guido Jung (the latter however eventually converted to Christianity in 1938). Furthermore, Margherita Sarfatti, a writer and socialite, was a close friend and possibly mistress of Mussolini and a propaganda and political adviser of his. She authored the popular biography of the Italian dictator entitled "Dux". Giorgio Bassani, a Jewish Italian author, has given an insight into the life of the Jewish middle class during the Fascist regime. Michele Sarfatti has written a thorough compendium of the situation of the Italian Jewish community under the fascist regime in his book The Jews in Mussolini's Italy: from equality to persecution. On the other hand, a significant number of Italian Jews were also active in anti-fascist organizations, and some joined the Resistenza: among them the most significant were the brothers Carlo and Nello Rosselli, Franco Momigliano, Leone Ginzburg and the brothers Ennio and Emanuele Artom.

The Fascist regime also helped, at the request of Vladimir Jabotinski, the establishment in 1934 of a navy officer training camp in Civitavecchia for Mandatory Palestine Jews, laying the foundations of the Israeli Navy. By helping the Zionist cause, Mussolini hoped to gain influence in the Middle East at the expense of the British Empire.

The Italian colonial authorities in Ethiopia after the conquest of this African state came into contact with the Beta Israel community and greatly favoured them, enacting special laws to protect them from offences and violences routinely committed against them by Christian and Muslim Ethiopians. The regime also encouraged cultural exchanges between the Italian Jewish community and the Ethiopian Jews. Incidentally, the first scholar to describe using a modern, scientific approach this ethnic group had been Filosseno Luzzatto, an Italki Jew. Starting in 1843, he collected and selected data about the Falasha.

On 28 July 1938, Pope Pius XI made a speech at Propaganda Fide college, expressing the view that mankind is "a single, large, universal human race" with "no room for special races", and the Alliance Israélite Universelle thanked him for that speech.

In September of that year in a speech to Belgian pilgrims, Pius XI proclaimed:

Mark well that in the Catholic Mass, Abraham is our Patriarch and forefather. Anti-Semitism is incompatible with the lofty thought which that fact expresses. It is a movement with which we Christians can have nothing to do. No, no I say to you it is impossible for a Christian to take part in anti-Semitism. It is inadmissible. Through Christ and in Christ we are the spiritual progeny of Abraham. Spiritually we are all Semites.

While some Catholic prelates tried to find compromises with Fascism, several others spoke out against racism. The Archbishop of Milan, Cardinal Schuster, who had supported Amici Israel, condemned racism as "heresy" and an "international danger ... not lesser than bolshevism" in his 13 November 1938 homily at Milan Cathedral.

After Italy entered the war in 1940, Jewish refugees living in Italy were interned in Italian concentration camps such as the Campagna concentration camp and the concentration camp at Ferramonti di Tarsia. In 1942, the Italian military commander in Croatia refused to hand over Jews in his zone to the Nazis. In January 1943, the Italians refused to cooperate with the Nazis in rounding up the Jews living in the occupied zone of France under their control, and in March prevented the Nazis from deporting Jews in their zone. German Foreign Minister Joachim von Ribbentrop complained to Benito Mussolini that "Italian military circles... lack a proper understanding of the Jewish question."

The deportations of Italian Jews to Nazi death camps began after September 1943, when the Italian Royal government capitulated to the Allies and, in response, the Germans forcibly disarmed the Italian armed forces. However, by the time they got to the Campagna internment camp, the inmates had already fled to the mountains with the help of the local inhabitants. Rev. Aldo Brunacci of Assisi, under the direction of his bishop, Giuseppe Nicolini, saved all the Jews who sought refuge in Assisi. This effort became the basis for the novel The Assisi Underground. In October 1943, Nazis raided the Jewish ghetto in Rome. In November 1943, the Jews of Genoa and Florence were deported to Auschwitz. Jews of Friuli were deported to Auschwitz via Risiera di San Sabba concentration camp. It is estimated that 7,682 Italian Jews became victims of the Holocaust. Celeste Di Porto terror of the Roman Jewish Ghetto reported the hiding places of twenty-six Jews, who were shot in the Fosse Ardeatine massacre of 1943 (postwar she served seven years of a 12 year sentence and died in 1981).

The attitude of the Italian Fascists (in their Italian Social Republic German puppet state in northern Italy) towards Italian Jews drastically changed in November 1943, after the Fascist authorities declared them to be of "enemy nationality" during the Congress of Verona and begun to actively participate in the prosecution and arrest of Jews. However, this prosecution by Italian authorities did not extend to people descended from mixed marriages. Initially, after the Italian surrender, the Italian police had only assisted in the round up of Jews when requested to do so by the German authorities. But after the Manifest of Verona, in which Jews were declared to be foreigners and, in times of war, enemies, this changed. Police Order No. 5 on 30 November 1943, issued by the Minister of the Interior of the RSI Guido Buffarini Guidi, ordered the Italian police to arrest Jews and confiscate their property.

After September 1943, when the Italian northern half effectively came under German occupation, SS-Obergruppenführer Karl Wolff, was appointed as the Supreme SS and Police Leader in Italy tasked with overseeing the final solution, the genocide of the Jews. Wolff assembled a group of SS personnel under him that had a vast experience in the extermination of Jews in Eastern Europe. Odilo Globocnik, appointed as Higher SS and Police Leader for the Adriatic coastal area, was responsible for the murder of hundreds of thousands of Jews and Gypsies in Lublin, Poland, before being sent to Italy. Karl Brunner was appointed as SS and Police Leader in Bolzano, South Tyrol, Willy Tensfeld in Monza for upper and western Italy and Karl-Heinz Bürger was placed in charge of anti-partisan operations.

The security police and the Sicherheitsdienst (SD) came under the command of Wilhelm Harster, based in Verona, who had previously held the same position in the Netherlands. Theodor Dannecker, previously active in the deportation of Greek Jews in the part of Greece occupied by Bulgaria, was made chief of the Judenreferat of the SD and was tasked with the deportation of the Italian Jews. Not seen as efficient enough, he was replaced by Friedrich Boßhammer, who was, like Dannecker, closely associated with Adolf Eichmann. Dannecker committed suicide after being captured in December 1945 while Boßhammer assumed a false name after the war. He was discovered and sentenced to life in jail in West Germany in 1972 but died before ever serving any time.

General Kurt Mälzer, the German commander in Rome, died in 1952. The Austrian Ludwig Koch was the head of the Gestapo and the Fascist Italian police in Rome and received three years imprisonment after the war.

=== Jews after the war ===
It is estimated that about 10,000 Italian Jews were deported to concentration and death camps, of whom 7,700 perished in the Holocaust, out of a pre-war Jewish population that amounted to 58,500 (46,500 by Jewish religion and 12,000 converted or non-Jewish sons of mixed marriages). The surviving community was able to maintain its distinctiveness throughout the following decades and continued to have a significant role in the fields of politics, literature, science and industry. Writers such as Giorgio Bassani, Natalia Ginzburg and Primo Levi were among the leading figures of the Italian culture in the post-war years.

A significant event that marked the Italian Jewish community was the conversion to Catholicism of the Chief Rabbi of Rome, Israel Zolli, in 1945.

The size of the Italian Jewish community has faced a slight but continuous drop throughout the postwar decades, partly because of emigration to Israel or the United States and partly because of low birth rates, assimilation and intermarriage, especially in the small congregations of the North. A significant increase occurred during the 1970s due to the arrival of Iranian Jews (following the ousting of the Shah) and North African Jews (mainly coming from Libya in the aftermath of Gaddafi's seizure of power).

== 21st century ==
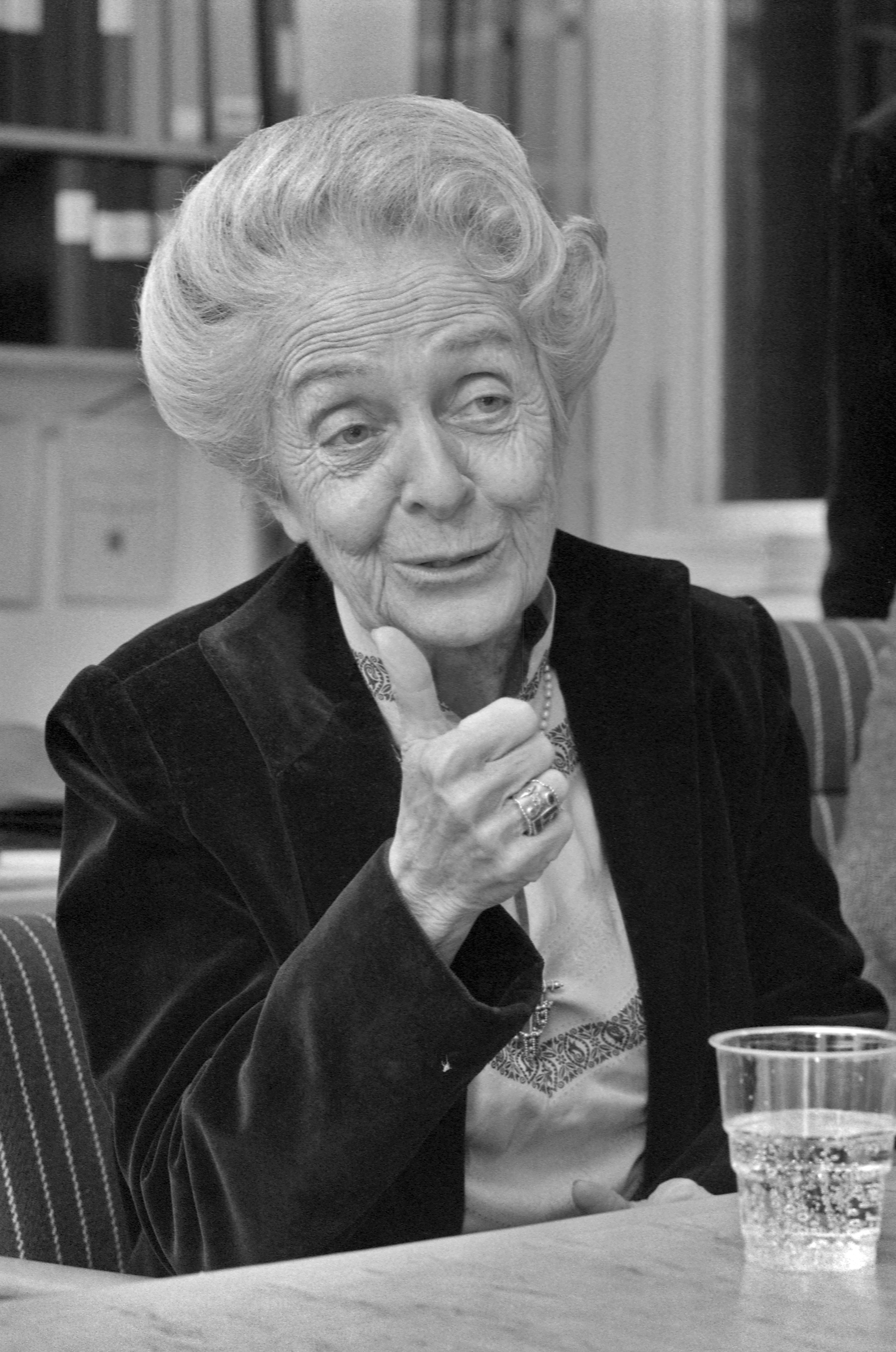
Rita Levi-Montalcini in 1986

In 2007 the Jewish population in Italy numbered around 45–46,000 people, decreased to 42,850 in 2015 (36,150 with Italian citizenship) and to 41,200 in 2017 (36,600 with Italian citizenship and 25–28,000 affiliated with the Union of Italian Jewish Communities), mainly because of low birth rates and emigration due to the financial crisis. There have been occasional antisemitic incidents in the last decades. On 13 December 2017 the Museum of Italian Judaism and the Shoah (MEIS) was inaugurated in Ferrara. The museum traces the history of the Jewish people in Italy starting from the Roman empire, and going through the Holocaust during the 20th century.

== Demographics ==
In 2007, there were approximately 45,000 Jews in Italy, of a total Italian population of 60 million people (i.e., 0.05-0.1% of the total), not counting recent migrations from Eastern Europe. The greatest concentrations were in Rome (20,000 people) and Milan (12,000 people).

== See also ==
=== History of the Jews in Italy by city / region ===
- History of the Jews in Apulia
- History of the Jews in Calabria
- History of the Jews in Florence
- History of the Jews in Livorno
- History of the Jews in Naples
- History of the Jews in Rome
- History of the Jews in Sardinia
- History of the Jews in Sicily
- History of the Jews in Trieste
- History of the Jews in Turin
- History of the Jews in Venice

=== Other ===
- History of the Jews in the Roman Empire
- Expulsion of the Jews from Sicily
- Religion in Italy
  - Christianity in Italy
  - Islam in Italy
- Roman Ghetto
- Venetian Ghetto
- List of Italian Jews
- List of Italian locations of Jewish history
- List of Italian religious minority politicians
- Bologna Guild of Silk Weavers, a Jewish guild of silk weavers who endeavored in Hebrew fine printing (1537-1540).
- Senigaglia family, an Italian Jewish family that can be traced back over 800 years.

== Bibliography ==
- Bassani, Giorgio, The Garden of the Finzi-Continis (Harvest/HJB, 1972; originally pub. as Il Giardino dei Finzi-Continis by Giulio Einaudi editore s.p.a., Turin). ISBN 0-15-634570-6
- Bettina, Elizabeth, It Happened in Italy: Untold Stories of How the People of Italy Defied the Horrors of the Holocaust (Thomas Nelson Inc, 2011) ISBN 9781595551023
- Collotti, Enzo,Il Fascismo e gli ebrei. Le leggi razziali in Italia (Bari / Roma, Editori Laterza, 2003).
- D'Amico, Giovanna, Quando l'eccezione diventa norma. La reintegrazione degli ebrei nell'Italia postfascista (Torino, Bollati Boringhieri, 2005).
- Druker, Jonathan, Primo Levi and Humanism After Auschwitz – Posthumanist Reflections (Palgrave MacMillan, NY, 2009). ISBN 978-1-4039-8433-3
- Feinstein, Wiley, The Civilization of the Holocaust in Italy: Poets, Artists, Saints, Anti-Semites (Madison, NJ: Fairleigh Dickinson University Press, 2004).
- Ferrara degli Uberti, Carlotta, "Fare gli ebrei italiani. Autorappesentazioni di una minoranza (1861–1918)", (Bologna, Il Mulino 2010).
- Harrowitz, Nancy A., Anti-Semitism, Misogyny, and the Logic of Cultural Difference: Cesare Lombroso and Matilde Serao (Lincoln and London: University of Nebraska Press, 1994).
- Jäger, Gudrun / Novelli-Glaab, Liana (eds.): Judentum und Antisemitismus im modernen Italien (Berlin, 2007).
- Levi, Primo, The Periodic Table (Schocken Books, NY, 1984; originally pub. as Il Sistema Periodico by Giulio Einaudi editore s.p.a., Turino, 1972). ISBN 0-8052-0811-9 (paperback)
- Marzano, Arturo / Schwarz, Guri, "Attentato alla sinagoga. Roma 9 ottobre 1982. Il conflitto israelo-palestinese e l'Italia" (Rome, Viella 2013).
- Pacifici Noja, Ugo G. / Pacifici, Giorgio eds. Ebreo chi? Sociologia degli ebrei italiani ( Jewish who? A sociology of the Italian Jews today), with contributions of Umberto Abenaim, Massimiliano Boni, Angelica Edna Calo Livne, Enzo Campelli, Renata Conforty Orvieto, Sergio Della Pergola, Natan Orvieto, Rossana Ottolenghi, Giorgio Pacifici, Ugo G. Pacifici Noja, Vittorio Pavoncello, Gian Stefano Spoto, Claudio Vercelli, with a foreword of Furio Colombo, Jaca Book, Milan, 2017 ISBN 978-88-16-41419-8
- Pavan, Ilaria, Il podestà ebreo. La storia di Renzo Ravenna tra fascismo e leggi razziali (Bari / Roma, Editori Laterza, 2006).
- Pavan, Ilaria, Tra indifferenza e oblio. Le conseguenze economiche delle leggi razziali in Italia 1938–1970 (Firenze, 2004).
- Pavan, Ilaria / Schwarz, Guri (a cura di), Gli ebrei in Italia tra persecuzione fascista e reintegrazione postbellica (Firenze, 2001).
- Sarfatti, Michele, Gli Ebrei nell'Italia fascista. Vicende, identità, persecuzione (Torino, 2000).
- Sarfatti, Michele, The Jews in Mussolini's Italy: From Equality to Persecution (Madison, University of Wisconsin Press, 2006) (Series in Modern European Cultural and Intellectual History).
- Schwarz, Guri, After Mussolini: Jewish Life and Jewish Memories in Post-Fascist Italy (London-Portland, OR: Vallentine Mitchell, 2012).
- Schächter, Elizabeth, "The Enigma of Svevo's Jewishness: Trieste and the Jewish Cultural Tradition," Italian Studies, 50 (1995), 24–47.
- Segre, Dan Vittorio, Memoirs of a Fortunate Jew: An Italian Story (Chicago, University of Chicago Press, 2008).
- Zimmerman, Joshua D. (ed), The Jews of Italy under Fascist and Nazi Rule 1922–1945 (Cambridge, CUP, 2005).
- Zuccotti, Susan, The Italians and the Holocaust – Persecution, Rescue, Survival (Basic Books, NY, 1987) ISBN 0465-03622-8
