= Abramo Pesaro =

Italian revolutionary

Personal life
- Born: 1818 Ferrara, Italy
- Died: August 31, 1882 (aged 64)

Religious life
- Religion: Judaism

Abramo Pesaro (1818 – August 31, 1882) was an Italian Jewish scholar, revolutionary, and communal leader.

== Biography ==
Pesaro was born in Ferrara in 1818, where as a young man he established a cultural and vocational training center. He was a cousin of the legislator Isacco Pesaro Maurogonato.

In 1846, Pesaro belonged to the local committee which organized an uprising against the papal government and was a member of the National Assembly, along with 2 other Jews, of the Roman republic of 1849. After the failure of the 1848 Revolution he lived in Venice until the establishment of the Kingdom of Italy in 1861. Afterward he returned to Ferrara, where he was active in both Jewish and general public life. He also served the new government, supporting the risorgimento, holding public offices tasked with assisting managing education and finance. He viewed the wars as a success for the Jewish people, because they resulted in the emancipation of Jews in the Kingdom of Sardinia.

Pesaro published various monographs on Italian Jewish history, in particular a work on the history of the Jews of Ferrara in 1878. His works also included a piece on Abraham Farissol, where he claimed his polemical work Magen Avraham was actually written in 1512, and a work which attributed the migration of Jews into Cento due to antisemitic violence in Pieve di Cento.

Pesaro died suddenly on August 31, 1882 at the age of 64.
