= Rietti =

Rieti is the surname of an ancient Jewish family originated from the city of Rieti, in central Italy; variants of the surname include Rietti, Rietty, Riettis, Arietti and Arieti.

- Gaio Isaac of Rieti, forefather of the family
- Moses ben Isaac of Rieti, also known as Moses Rieti or Mosè di Gaio (1388-1460), son of Gaio Isaac, poet and physician
- Rabbi Jonathan Rietti, son of Robert Rietti, an Orthodox rabbi involved in Jewish outreach, living in USA
- Robert Rietti (1923–2015), also known as Robert Rietty, a British actor, director, and writer
- Victor Rietti (1888–1963), father of Robert, also actor, writer, and violinist
- Vittorio Rieti (1898–1994), Italian composer
