= Devorà Ascarelli =

Italian poet

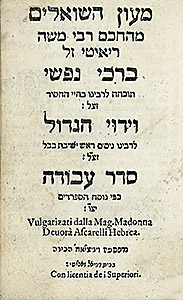
An Italian book which features translation into rhymed Italian by Devorà Ascarelli.

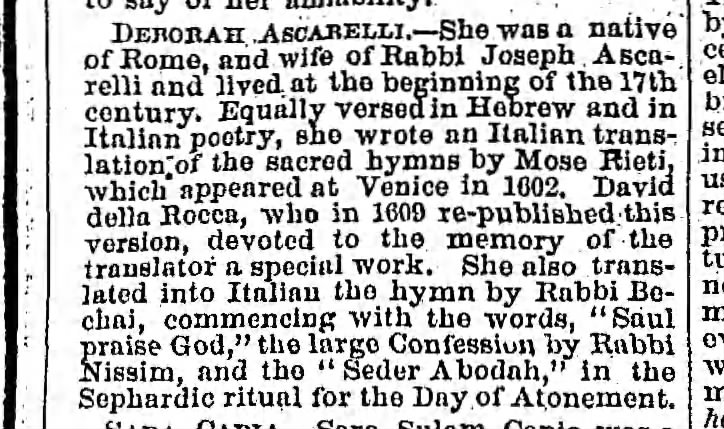
The American Israelite. Cincinnati, Ohio. 19-04-1867. Page 6.

Devorà Ascarelli was a 16th-century Italian poet living in Rome, Italy. Ascarelli was likely the first Jewish woman to have a book of her own work published.

== Biography ==
Little is known about Devorà Ascarelli, and some of what is known is contradictory. The dedication of her book, L’abitacolo Degli Oranti, indicates that she lived in Rome in the 16th century and was married to Joseph Ascarelli. Thought to be born into the Italian merchant class, Ascarelli was well-educated and was able to devote time to translation and other writings. No maiden name is mentioned in relation to Ascarelli. Some have suggested that she and her husband may have been cousins and thus shared the same family name. Connections can be drawn between the Ascarelli family and Catalan leaders in Rome.

== L’abitacolo Degli Oranti ==
Ascarelli's book L’abitacolo Degli Oranti was published in Venice in 1601. It contains translations of liturgical texts from Hebrew into Italian alongside poetry in Italian penned by Ascarelli herself. It is sometimes known by the name of its first text, Me’on ha-Sho’alim or The Abode of the Supplicants.

The manner in which the book was published is also contested. Some sources claim that a friend named David della Rocca published Ascarelli's work posthumously. Others claim that Rocca, a Roman Jew, would not have been allowed to publish in Venice, and that it is more likely that Rocca simply assisted the still living Ascarelli with the publication of her work. The publisher was Daniel Zanetti, a Christian who published Jewish books.

The first poem in the book, Me’on ha-Sho’alim, is one part of the Mikdash Me'at, Il Tempio or The Small Sanctuary, a poem for Yom Kippur written by Moses Rieti of Perugia (1388–1459). Ascarelli's translation puts the text into rhymed Italian.

Other translations in the book include prose translations of Barekhi Nafshi (Benedici il Signore o anima mia) by Bahya ibn Paquda of Saragossa, La Grande Confessione by a rabbi by the name of Nissim, and a Sephardic prayer for Yom Kippur.

Ascarelli composed two sonnets published in the book. The first, Il Ritratto di Susanna ("The Picture of Susanna"), is based on the apocryphal story of Susanna. In the second, Quanto e’ in me di Celeste ("Whatever in me is of Heaven"), the narrator describes gaining virtues from Heaven like a bee from flowers. While anonymous, this poem has been interpreted as particularly autobiographical because the name Devora or Deborah means "bee."

Based on her poetry, Ascarelli has been described as "pious," "demure and withdrawn". Others have argued that the devotional tone of Ascarelli's poetry may have been chosen in conformance with gender roles of her time.

== Bibliography ==
- Ascarelli, Debora, and Pellegrino Ascarelli. Debora Ascarelli Poetessa. Rome: Sindacato italiano arti grafiche, 1925. Includes the text of Devora Ascarelli's original L’abitacolo Degli Oranti without Hebrew text and further materials.
- Pesaro, A. “Alle Donne celebri Israelite.” In Il Vessilio Israelitico 29 (1881): 34–37 and 67–68.
- Henry, Sondra and Emily Taitz. Written Out of History: A Hidden Legacy of Jewish Women Revealed through Their Writing and Letters. New York: 1978. Pages 130-131 include two sonnets in Ascarelli's Italian translated into English by Vladimir Rus.
