= Moses Kalfo =

Eleventh-century Italian Jewish scholar

Moses Kalfo was an Italian Jewish scholar who lived at the beginning of the eleventh century at Bari, where he taught at the yeshiva there.

He is known through lexicographical explanations cited by Nathan ben Jehiel, author of the Arukh. Nathan ben Jehiel probably studied under him for some time.
