= David de Pomis =

Italian-Jewish physician (1525–1594)

- Born: 1524; Spoleto (Papal States)
- Died: 1594; Venice (Republic of Venice)
- Occupations: Medical doctor, philosopher, linguist

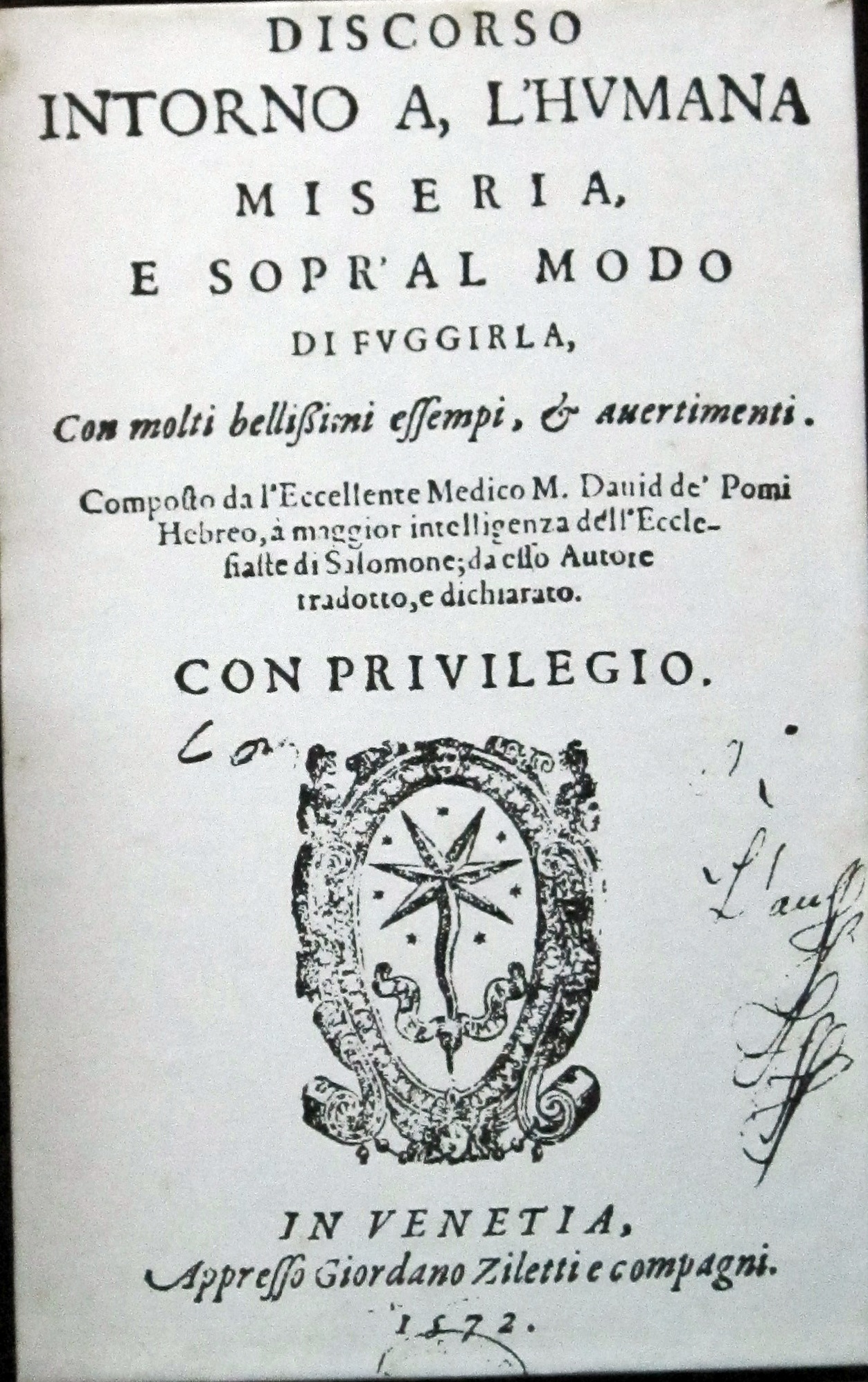
A discourse in Human suffering and How to Escape It, 1572, Venice

David ben Isaac de Pomis (David de' Pomi) (1524–1594) was an Italian-Jewish physician, rabbi, linguist, philosopher, a significant figure in the intellectual exchange between Jews and Christians, and publisher of a 1587 trilingual Hebrew-Aramaic, Latin, and Italian dictionary known as Semah David, and De Medico Hebræo Enarratio Apologica, an apologetic work which deals with Jewish medicine.

== Biography ==
Born into a wealthy family of bankers in Spoleto, Umbria, his father lost his fortune during the Italian Wars. His family claimed descent from King David. According to ancient Italian-Jewish tradition, his aristocratic family, called "Min HaTapuchim", or of the apples (pomis or pomeria), was relocated from Jerusalem to Rome by Titus. In 1527, when Pomis was two, the Sack of Rome prompted his family to relocate to Camerino. Along the way, the convoys carrying their possessions were attacked and their goods taken. Now poor, they relocated to Bevagna and then to Todi. He studied at the University of Perugia and graduated with his medical degree in 1551, before settling in Magliano Sabino, but was compelled to migrate from town to town for a lengthy period due to the Church's anti-Jewish legislation.

Pope Paul IV's bull prevented Jewish physicians from treating Christians. However, Pope Pius IV granted Pomis the right to treat Christian patients in 1565, but died five days later, and his successor Pope Pius V rescinded the grant. Pomis then moved to Venice after 1569. In Venice he established relationships with Margaret of Savoy, Giacomo Contarini (1536–1595), Pasquale Cicogna, and Francesco Maria, Duke Urbino, as well as Jewish leaders such as Samuel Judah Katzenellenbogen.

Pomis translated Ecclesiastes into Italian and wrote a work on the bubonic plague, and wrote other works of biblical exegesis. He is notable for his call for equality and religious liberty for Jewish people. His Zemah David was dedicated to Pope Sextus V, who had reversed the earlier anti-Jewish physicians bull. He cites David Kimhi's Shorashim, Nathan ben Yehiel's Arukh, and Elia Levita's Tishbi. He was cited by Johannes Buxtorf and Joseph Scaliger. His Medico Hebræo earned praise from Aldus Manutius the Younger. His work defended Jews, recounting the anti-Jewish actions of the time and refuting anti-Jewish claims, and emphasized medical humanism and compassion.

== Jewish Encyclopedia bibliography ==
- Wolf, Bibl. Hebr. i. 311–313;
- Jost, Annalen, 1839, p. 223;
- Grätz. Gesch. ix. 504;
- Il Vessillo Israelitico, 1875, p. 175; 1876, p. 319;
- Berliner's Magazin, 1875, p. 48;
- Steinschneider, Jewish Literature, p. 235;
- idem, in Monatsschrift, xliii. 32;
- Dukes, in R. E. J. i. 145–152;
- Vogelstein and Rieger, Gesch. der Juden in Rom, ii. 259–260;
- Carmoly, Histoire des Médecins Juifs, i. 150–153.
