= Bologna Guild of Silk Weavers =

Italian Guild of Jewish Merchants

The Bologna Guild of Silk Weavers (Hebrew: בעלי ברית עושי מלאכת המשי) were a guild of Jewish silk weavers in Bologna during the 1530s and 1540s.

== Hebrew printing activities ==
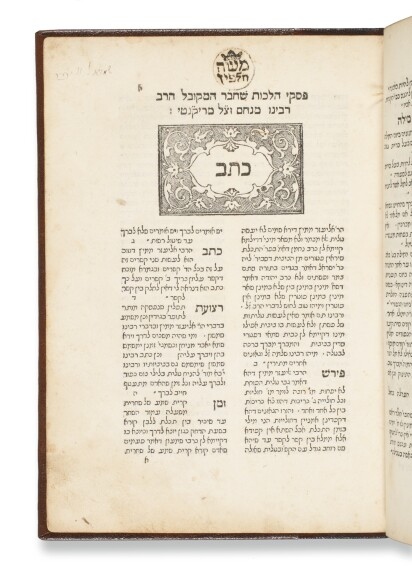
Recanati, Menahem (printed by the Bologna Guild of Silk Weavers, 1538)

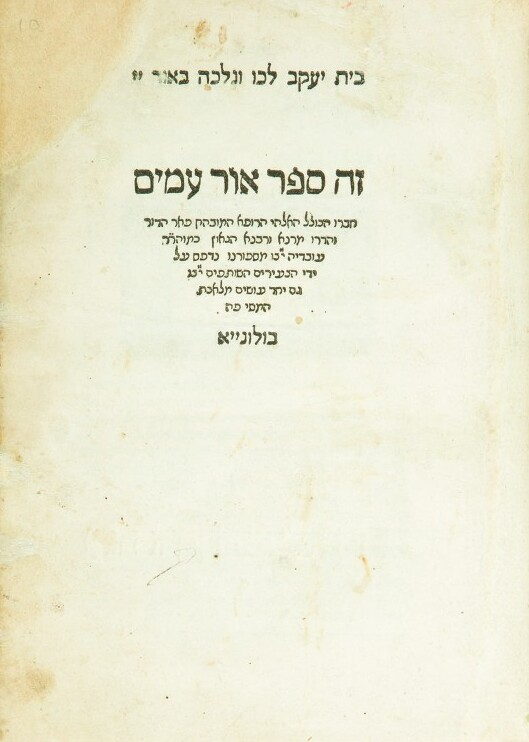
Or Ammim by Obadia Sforno (1538)

Bologna Jewry has had a history of Jewish guild owners, including Abraham Dei Tintori, a dyer who printed the first Hebrew Bible in Bologna in 1482 (the first Hebrew book to be printed there was likely in 1477, an editio princeps of David Kimchi's work. This book was the first Hebrew Pentateuch with nikkud, with the commentaries of Rashi and Targum.

The Bologna Guild of Silk Weavers operated a printing press with which they issued nine editions of Hebrew books between 1537 and 1540. Among these volumes were important liturgies, including a deluxe edition of the Machzor by Elijah ben Menahem HaZaken of Le Mans in 1537. In 2018, a special edition on vellum of this printing (formerly from the collection of Salman Schocken) was offered for sale at Sotheby's in New York. Other important sales included a painted edition of the prayer book on vellum from the Valmadonna Trust Library sale.

Other important works printed by the Guild of Silk Weavers included the books by important Italian rabbis Menahem Recanati and Obadia ben Jacob Sforno, who was a resident in Bologna at the time of the Hebrew printing of his work on religious philosophy (called Or 'amim, "Light for the Nations").

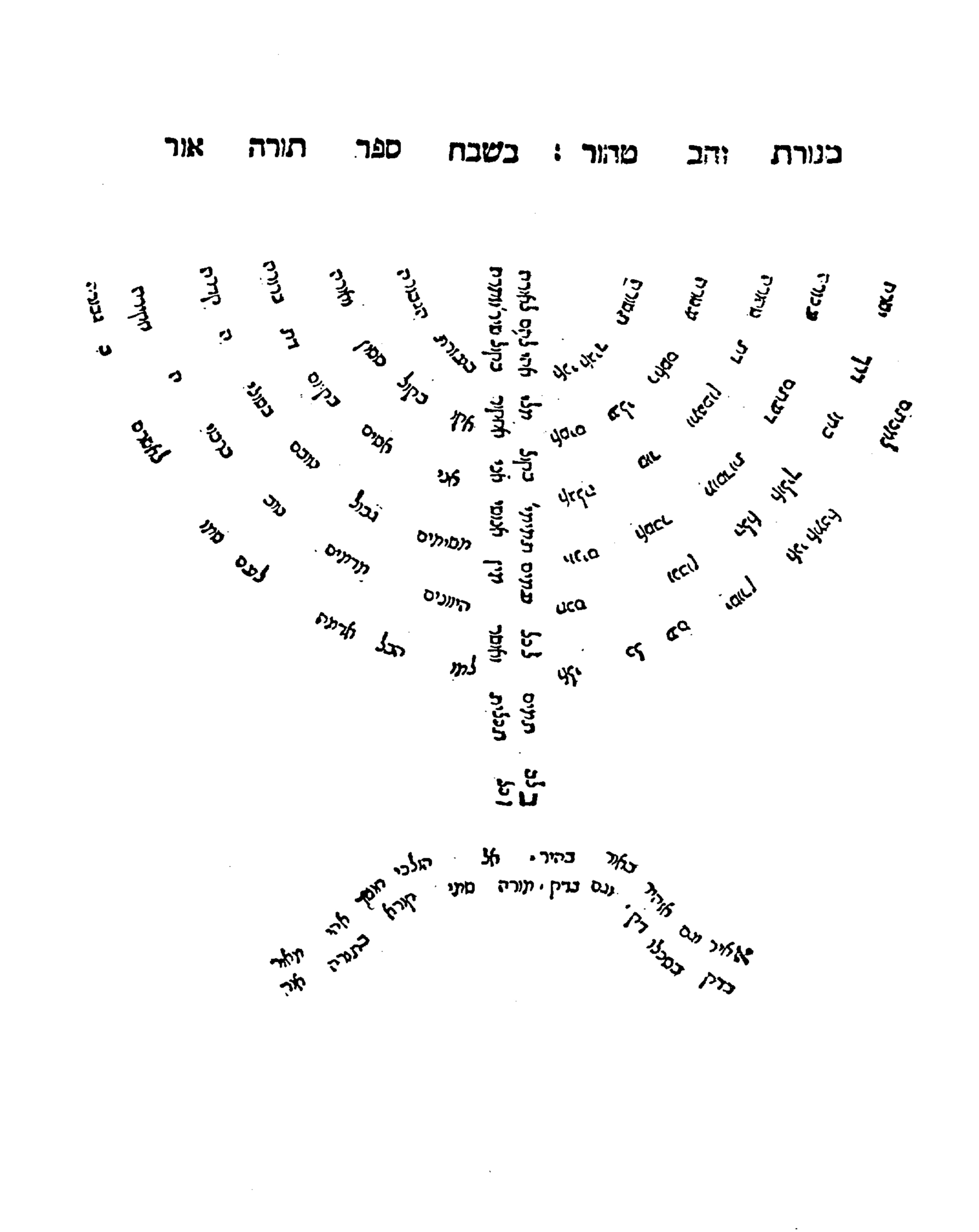
Micrographic Menorah of the Second Temple in a book printed in Bologna 1538 by the Guild of Silk Weavers

Another book printed by the Guild of Silk Weavers in 1538 was "Torah or" by Joseph ibn Yaḥya ben David on the subjects of Paradise and Hell, which features the first printed image of the Menorah (Temple); the image is created from small printed words as a Micrographic image. The designer (presumably an artist in the guild) put the Menorah on a pedestal and not a marble base, as is shown on the Arch of Titus.

Hebrew printed books from Bologna are very rare today, especially on the rare book market.
