= Leonard V. Rutgers =

Dutch historian and archaeologist of Late Antiquity

Leonard Victor Rutgers (born 4 January 1964) is a Dutch historian and archaeologist specializing in Late Antiquity, Jewish history in the Roman world, and early Christianity. He is Professor of Late Antiquity at Utrecht University.

== Early life and education ==
Rutgers studied archaeology, ancient history, and art history in Amsterdam, Rome, and Jerusalem, as well as Jewish studies in Vienna. He later added patristics to his fields of study and earned a doctorate at Duke University with a dissertation on the Jewish catacombs of Rome.

== Academic career ==
Rutgers serves as Professor of Late Antiquity at Utrecht University, where he has also held administrative roles. In 2015, he was appointed a member of the Pontificia Accademia Romana di Archeologia (Pontifical Roman Academy of Archaeology). In 2018, he became a member of the Royal Holland Society of Sciences and Humanities (Koninklijke Hollandsche Maatschappij der Wetenschappen, KHMW). He has led international and interdisciplinary archaeological field projects, funded by the Netherlands Organization for Scientific Research, the Rothschild Foundation, the Royal Netherlands Academy of Arts and Sciences, and various additional sponsors, including "The Rise of Christianity: A New Interdisciplinary Perspective," "Reconfiguring Diaspora: The Transformation of the Jewish Diaspora in Late Antiquity," and "Diaspora, Migration and the Sciences: A New Integrated Perspective" at the Netherlands Institute for Advanced Studies. His research integrates archaeology, history, radiocarbon dating, isotopic studies, digital humanities, and ancient DNA, and has been published in peer-reviewed venues.

== Research and contributions ==
Rutgers is known for work on the Jewish diaspora in the Roman Empire and the archaeology of early Christianity, including studies of the Roman catacombs and Late Antique cultural exchange. Through interdisciplinary work that bridges archaeology and science, he has uncovered how Jewish communities in the Western Roman world were deeply woven into the social, economic, and cultural fabric of pagan society. Rutgers attributes the rise of anti-Judaism in Europe to the ascendancy of Christianity, identifying this as the period when Judaism and Christianity began to diverge fundamentally. His research gained attention after radiocarbon analyses suggested that Rome’s Jewish catacombs were established about a century before the earliest Christian ones. Related work, based on isotopic studies in the catacombs of St. Callixtus, indicated that early Roman Christians relied heavily on fish for protein, suggesting a generally modest economic background. He has also employed quantitative methods, analyzing construction costs and burial data from the Roman catacombs to reassess the economic and organizational dimensions of Jewish and early Christian funerary practice. In collaboration with geneticist David Reich, he is investigating how ancient DNA can illuminate population movements across Europe during Roman and medieval times. Rutgers has also been a columnist for the Dutch financial newspaper Het Financieele Dagblad (FD), and has published several award-winning popular-audience books on archaeology and ancient history, including Subterranean Rome: In Search of the Roots of Christianity in the Catacombs of the Eternal City (2000), De klassieke wereld in 52 ontdekkingen (2018) and Israel aan de Tiber (2023).

== Honors ==
- Keetje Hodshon Prize of the Royal Holland Society of Sciences and Humanities for The Jews in Late Ancient Rome (1996).
- Member, Pontificia Accademia Romana di Archeologia (2015–).
- Member, Royal Holland Society of Sciences and Humanities (Koninklijke Hollandsche Maatschappij der Wetenschappen, KHMW) (2018–).
- Homerus Prize of the Dutch Classical Association for De klassieke wereld in 52 ontdekkingen (2019).
- Research Prize of the Werkgroep Italië Studies for Israël aan de Tiber (2024).

== Selected publications ==
- The Jews in Late Ancient Rome: Evidence of Cultural Interaction in the Roman Diaspora (Leiden, New York & Cologne: E. J. Brill, 1995). Reviewed by M. D. Goodman, "Jews at Rome", The Classical Review 47 (2) (October 1997), pp. 365–366.
- The Use of Sacred Books in the Ancient World (editor, 1998).
- The Hidden Heritage of Diaspora Judaism (Leuven: Peeters, 1998). Reviewed by M. Pucci Ben-Zev, Jewish History 14, 253–257 (2000).
- What Athens Has to Do with Jerusalem. Essays on Classical, Jewish and Early Christian Art and Archaeology in Honor of Gideon Foerster (editor, 2000).
- Subterranean Rome: In Search of the Roots of Christianity in the Catacombs of the Eternal City (Leuven: Peeters, 2000). Reviewed by Allen Kerkeslager in Bryn Mawr Classical Review (BMCR 2000.10.11).
- Making Myths. Jews in Early Christian Identity Formation (Leuven: Peeters, 2009). Reviewed by Andrew S. Jacobs in AJS Review 34:2 (2010), pp. 416-418.
- De klassieke wereld in 52 ontdekkingen (2018). Recensie door Atte Jongstra, "Niets is sterker dan Romeins beton", NRC (28 June 2019).
- Israel aan de Tiber. Joods leven in het oude Rome (2023).
- Letters in the Dust: The Epigraphy and Archaeology of Medieval Jewish Cemeteries (editor, with Ortal-Paz Saar, 2023).
- Frontiers: The Transformation and Christianization of the Roman Empire between Centre and Periphery (editor, with S.T.A.M. Mols and S. de Blaauw, 2024), 4 vols.
- The Cambridge Encyclopaedia of Late Antique Art and Archaeology (editor, with Neil Christie, Robin M. Jensen, and Jodi Magness), 2 vols. (Cambridge: Cambridge University Press, 2025).
