= Nathan ben Jehiel =

11th-century Italian Jewish lexicographer

Nathan ben Jehiel of Rome (Hebrew: נתן בן יחיאל מרומי, romanized: Nāṯān ben Yəḥiʾel mirRomi, c. 1035 – 1106) was a Jewish Italian lexicographer. He authored the Arukh, a dictionary for Rabbinic Judaism that was the first work to examine Jewish Babylonian Aramaic. He is therefore referred to as "the Arukh."

== Biography ==
Nathan was born in Rome not later than 1035 to one of the most notable Roman families of Jewish scholars. Owing to an error propagated by Chaim Yosef David Azulai, he has been regarded as a scion of the house of de Pomis. However, according to present scholarship, it is almost a certainty that he belonged to the Anaw (ענו, Italian: degli Mansi) family. Aside from being an acknowledged authority on halakha, Nathan's father, Jehiel ben Abraham, was a liturgic poet like most contemporary Italian rabbis.

The details of Nathan's sad life must be excerpted and pieced together from several autobiographic verses appended to the first edition of his lexicon. It appears that he began life not as a student but as a peddler of linenwear, which was then considered a distasteful occupation. The death of his employer caused him to abandon trade for the Torah. He returned home, where his father began to bestow upon him the treasures of learning, the accumulation of which was continued under foreign masters.

Nathan went to Sicily. Maṣliaḥ ben Eliah al-Baṣaq had just returned from a course of study under Hai ben Sherira, the last gaon of Pumbedita Academy in Baghdad in Lower Mesopotamia. Nathan learned these traditions, leading some to the erroneous notion that he had himself pilgrimed to Pumbedita.

Then Narbonne enticed him, where he sat under the prominent exegete and aggadist Moshe ha-Darshan. On his way home, he probably lingered for a while at the several academies flourishing in Italy, notably at Pavia, where a rabbi named Moses was headmaster, and at Bari, where Moses Kalfo taught. He arrived home from his scholarly travels sometime before his father's death, which occurred about 1070 and allowed him to illustrate the simplicity of funeral rites he had advocated.

The Roman community entrusted the rabbinic college's presidency to Jehiel's three learned sons: Daniel, Nathan, and Abraham – 'the geonim of the house of Rabbi Jehiel', as they were styled. Daniel, the eldest, seems to have composed a commentary on the Mishnaic section Zeraim, from which the Arukh quotes frequently and to have stood in friendly relations with Christian scholars. The three brothers rapidly acquired general recognition as authorities on the Torah, and numerous inquiries were addressed to them. Their most frequent correspondent was Solomon ben Isaac ("Yitzhaki"), an Italian scholar.

Nathan's private life was unfortunate. All his children died very young, and he sought solace in philanthropy and scholarly application. In the year 1085, he built a mikva, and about seventeen years later, in September 1101, he and his brothers erected a synagogue. In February 1101, he completed the Arukh.

== The Arukh ==
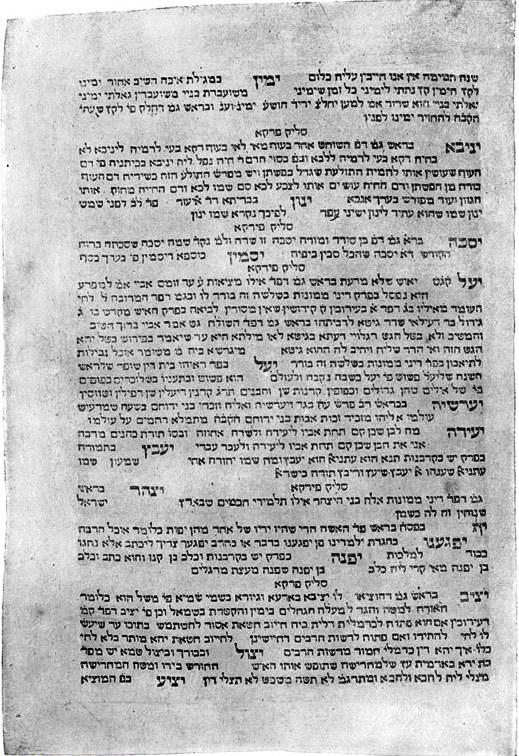
First page from the first edition of the Arukh (ca. 1480)

=== Sources ===
The sources of this work are numerous. Aside from the Arukh of Tzemach ben Poltoi, which he utilized (it should be stated, however, that Solomon Judah Loeb Rapoport and Abraham Geiger deny this), he used a vast number of additional works. Above all, he placed under contribution the information received, in both oral and written form, from R. Maẓliaḥ and R. Moses ha-Darshan, the former of whom, in particular, through his studies under Hai, had made himself the repository of Eastern learning. The entire extent of Nathan's indebtedness to his authorities can not be estimated because of the hundreds of books he cited, many of which have not been preserved. But none will deny his obligation to Gershom ben Judah, whom he repeatedly quotes, though, as Kohut rightly maintains against Rapoport, he can not have been his disciple.

Similarly, he used the writings of Chananel ben Chushiel and Nissim ben Jacob, both living at Kairouan. So frequent were the references to Chananel in the lexicon that Rabbeinu Tam regarded the work as based entirely on Chananel's commentaries, while Isaac ben Moses of Vienna, as a matter of course, referred to R. Hananeel almost all of the lexicon's anonymous statements.

Hai Gaon figures very frequently in its pages, sometimes designated as "the Gaon." It has notably assimilated all philologic material contained in his commentary on the mishna in order Tohorot.

=== Method and scope ===
Since the structure of the Arukh consists, as it were, of so many bricks, it is hard to decide whether the builder possessed all the linguistic learning stored up in it. None can gainsay the author's philologic spirit of inquiry – quite remarkable for his day, which antedated the science of linguistics; his frequent collation of "variæ lectiones" is notable, while his fine literary sense often saved him from crude etymological errancies.

The multitude of languages in the Arukh is prodigious even for a period of polyglot proclivities. The non-Jewish Aramaic dialects are encountered side by side with Arabic, Persian, Medieval Greek, Latin, and even Old Slavonic, while Italian seems as familiar to the author as the various rabbinic forms of style.

This multiplicity of languages, however, is currently generally considered a mere mark of the compilation's multifarious character; the credit for the exegetic employment of the several languages is given to Nathan's authorities rather than to himself.

While he undoubtedly possessed a superficial and empiric knowledge of Latin and Greek, of which the former already contained an admixture of contemporary Italian, and the latter (subdivided into spoken and written Greek) was still partly used in southern Italy; while he may have acquired a desultory acquaintance with Arabic, and certainly was quite familiar with Italian, yet it may be stated almost with certainty that the majority of his etymologies were compiled and copied from his various source-books.

For this reason, the various dialects appear in the Arukh under several names, each originating seemingly in a different author, as Arabic, for example, which occurs under three distinct denotations, possibly without Nathan being aware of their synonymity. To the exact cause may be assigned the polyonymy of the Hebrew and rabbinic dialects in the Arukh and the presence of a great deal of geographic and ethnographic information that the author did not acquire in actual travel. As regards the grammatical derivation of Hebrew words, Nathan deviated from the principle of triliteral roots discovered by Judah ben David Hayyuj and adopted by the Spanish grammarians as a rule; like most French and German rabbis, he considered two letters, and at times one, sufficient to form a Hebrew root.

=== Its importance ===
The Arukh is a significant monument in the history of culture. Aside from its purely scientific value as a storehouse of old readings and interpretations as well as of titles of many lost books, it is important as the only literary production of the Italian Jews of that age. Moreover, though mainly a compilation, it is one of the most noteworthy medieval monuments of learning. Compiled at the historical juncture when Jewish scholarship was transplanted from Babylonia and northern Africa to Europe and was subject to aberration, it signally emphasized the necessity of preserving the old rabbinical treasures and traditions. Its service in this respect was equivalent to that rendered by the two great products of contemporary Spanish and French Jews – Alfasi's Talmudic code and Rashi's commentary. Together the three contributed toward the spread of rabbinic study. Besides, one has to depend upon the Arukh for whatever knowledge one may have of the intellectual condition of the Italian Jews in the 11th century. Since its author, for example, uses the Italian language freely to elucidate etymologies, he frequently offers the vernacular nomenclature for objects of natural history that he repeatedly calls into service for purposes of illustration of the customs of foreign peoples, the character of the reading public of his day can easily be inferred. The dawn of skepticism may be discerned in his remark that as regards conjuring and amulets, neither their grounds nor their sources were known.

=== Influence and editions ===
The Arukh rapidly achieved a wide circulation. According to Kohut, even Rashi was already in a position to utilize it in the second edition of his commentaries, having been acquainted with it by Kalonymos ben Sabbatai, the noted rabbi who had moved to Worms from Rome. Kalonymus, however, can at best have transported to his new home but meager information concerning the Arukh, as his removal occurred about thirty years before its completion, the first folios he may have seen since he was intimately acquainted with Nathan. A generation after the time of Rashi, the Arukh is found in general use among the Biblical commentators, the tosafists, and the legalistic and the grammatical authors. Numerous manuscript copies were brought into circulation; and with the introduction of printing its spread was widely extended.

The first edition, which bears neither the date nor the place of publication, probably belongs to the year 1477, while in 1531 Daniel Bomberg of Venice issued what is no doubt the best of the early editions. In both the copying and the printing processes, however, the work suffered innumerable alterations and mutilations, which have been recently repaired to a certain extent by the scientific edition issued, based on the first editions and of seven manuscripts, by Alexander Kohut.

=== Supplements and compendia ===
A further proof of the popularity gained by the Arukh lies in the numerous supplements and compendiums which soon clustered about it. Until recent times, all rabbinic lexicons have been grounded on the Arukh. The first supplement was written in the 12th century by Samuel ben Jacob ibn Jam'i or Jama' of Narbonne, under the title Agur, a small work of little significance.

In the 13th century, Tanhum of Jerusalem wrote a lexicon, Al-Murshid al-Kafi, which completed, corrected, and replaced the rare Arukh.

At the beginning of the 16th century, Abraham Zacuto, author of the Yuḥasin, composed a supplement entitled Iqqere ha-Talmud, of which only a fragment of the latter part has survived. About the same time, Santes Pagnino, a Christian and friar of the Dominican Order, issued an Enchiridion Expositionis Vocabulorum Haruch, Thargum, Midraschim Rabboth, et Aliorum Librorum. The general method of the Arukh was also adopted by Elia Levita, who, in his Meturgeman and Tishbi, advanced a step in that he differentiated the targumic and the Talmudic words and also sought to complete his prototype.

The manner and the matter of the Arukh were closely followed by Johannes Buxtorf in his Lexicon Chaldaicum Talmudicum, and by David de Pomis in his Tzemach David. Early in the seventeenth century, Menahem Lonzano issued his small but useful supplement, Ma'arikh, concerned particularly with foreign words. Ma'arikh ha-Ma'arekhet, a compilation by Philippe d'Aquin, appeared in Paris in 1629.

No doubt the best supplements to the Arukh were written in the same century by Benjamin Musaphia, a physician at Hamburg, and by David Cohen de Lara (d. 1674). Mussafia's Musaf he-'Arukh (1655), probably known also as Arukh he-Hadash, according to Immanuel Löw, devoted itself mainly to Greek and Latin derivatives, leaning largely on Johannes Buxtorf. David Cohen de Lara published the Keter Kehunnah (Hamburg, 1668), in which he had set before himself polyglot purposes, and which, though brought down to "resh," was published only as far as the letter "yod". His minor work, on the other hand, Ir David (Amsterdam, 1638), of which the second part was called Metzudat Tziyyon, confined itself almost exclusively to Greek derivatives.

The nineteenth century witnessed the publication of several works accredited to the classic lexicon. Isaiah Berlin (d. 1799) wrote Hafla'ah Sheba-'Arakhin, annotations to the Arukh. I. M. Landau appended similar notes to his unscientific edition of the Arukh; while S. Lindermann has issued elucidations under the title Sarid ba-'Arakhin (Thorn, 1870).

Besides, there are several anonymous dictionaries attached to the same classic, e.g., the abbreviated Arukh, Arukh ha-Katzar, known also as Kitzur Arukh, which was successively printed at Constantinople (1511), Cracow (1591), and Prague (1707), and which contains merely the explanation of words, without their etymologies.

Another brief Arukh, frequently cited by Johannes Buxtorf and discovered in a manuscript at Bern, has been found to contain numerous French and German annotations. A dictionary of still wider scope than the Arukh is the Sefer Melitzah of Solomon ben Samuel. Solomon Marcus Schiller-Szinessy, in fine, records the existence of a Lexicon of the Difficult Words in the Talmud.

Between 1878 and 1892, Alexander Kohut published Arukh Hashalem, a vastly expanded version of the Arukh incorporating conclusions from modern philology.

== See also ==
- Hachmei Provence
