= Moses da Rieti =

Italian poet (1388–1466)

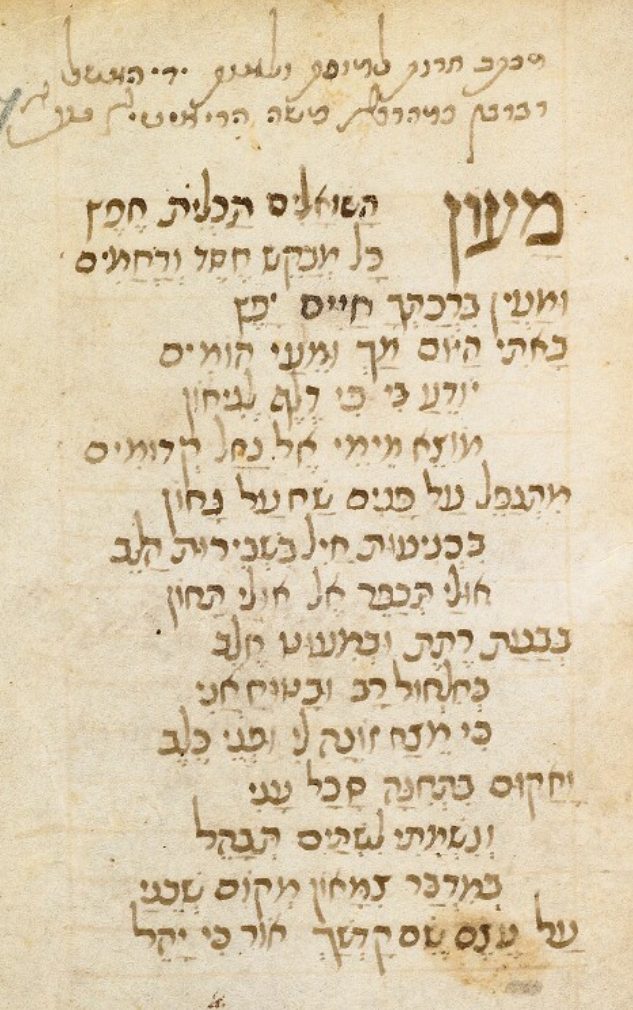
15th century manuscript of Miqdash Me'at Me'on haShoalim from Italy in the Bodleian Library

Moses da Rieti (also known as Moshe ben Yitzḥak and Mosè di Gaio; 1388–1466) was an Italian-Jewish poet, philosopher, and physician. Born in Rieti, he composed works in Hebrew and Italian and has been called a Hebrew Dante. His major work, the transitionally post-medieval and philosophical Hebrew poem Miqdash me'at, includes an encyclopedia of sciences, a Jewish paradise fantasy, and a post-biblical history of Jewish literature.

== Overview ==
Moses was born in Rieti in 1388 to Isaac (Gaio), probably a banker. He left Rieti to study medicine but returned in 1422 to practice medicine and banking there. He had at least three sons by his wife, Sella: Isaac (Gaio), the firstborn, Leone, and Bonaiuto, and all three followed him into the trade. He was rabbi in Rome from 1431 and filled various community roles around the Papal States throughout his life, also maintaining a yeshiva in Narni. Miqdash me'at (Little Sanctuary), his major work, is a transitionally post-medieval and philosophical Hebrew poem explicitly inspired by the Divine Comedy in both plot and structure, and also includes an encyclopedia of sciences, a Jewish paradise fantasy, and a post-biblical history of Jewish literature. Miqdash me'at makes explicit metaphor in its structure as an homage to the Temple of Jerusalem. Rieti was also private physician to Pope Pius II.

Rieti was influenced by Yehuda Romano. Rieti's style is complex and he speaks on behalf of the Jewish people, with Neoplatonism and Aristotelianism especially in the tradition of Maimonides, and follows the terza rima of Dante Alighieri, the first Hebrew poet to do so. Called a Hebrew Dante, he also authored a poetic dialogue between the Daughters of Zelophehad called Iggeret Ya'ar ha-Levanon (Forest of Lebanon). Rieti's work exhibits a deep familiarity with the Tannaim, Geonim, and Amoraim, including contemporary philosophy in Greek, Arabic, and Hebrew. It is said he later abandoned philosophy for kabbalah. Deborah Ascarelli and Lazaro da Viterbo translated his hymns into Italian. He died in Rome in 1466.

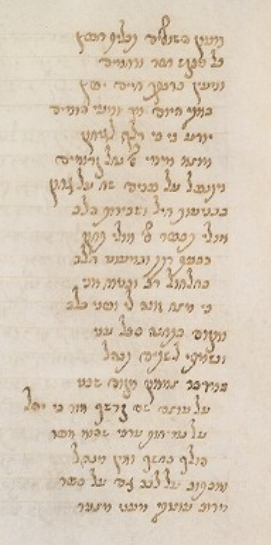
15th century manuscript of Miqdash Me'at Me'on haShoalim from Italy in the Bodleian Library

== Works ==
=== Poetry ===
- Miqdash Me'at, begun in 1415 according to its text. Apparently incomplete. Sometimes cited by its sections Heikhal and Ulam, by its subsection Me'on haShoalim, or by the name Shalshelet haQabbalah. The subsection Me'on haShoalim was printed in Venice, c. 1585 with translation into Italian by Lazzaro da Viterbo, again in Venice, c. 1601 with translation into Italian by Deborah Ascarelli (dedication by David della Rocca dated 20 October 1601), and again in Venice, 1609, with a translation into Judeo-Italian by(?) Samuel de Castelnuovo. Two anonymous translations of Me'on HaShoalim into Italian are extant in manuscript, including MS Bod. Quo. 197 f. 19r-24r and MS Bod. Mich. 486. According to Goldenthal, the text of Me'on haShoalim varies across versions more than the other sections. There are at least 59 MSS of Midqash Me'at, 17 complete. According to Joseph Almanzi (also Samuel David Luzzatto) there was a partial holograph MS in the possession of Mordecai Ghirondi, which survives in the critical edition (MS BL Add. 27001) Almanzi prepared based on 5 manuscripts in 1836-1838, including some commentary. According to Moshe Hillel, and Israel Adler, the "holograph" manuscript is now Cambridge Add. 1193, which Stefan Reif dates 16-17c in his catalog. A different manuscript (BL Add. 27012) was copied by Moses' great-grandson from a holograph manuscript, according to its colophon. Both these manuscripts (inter alia) end abruptly with the words בא סנחריב, although a continuation ומחריב עיר ממזרח שמש עד מבואו מהולל שם ה' אמן is found in a later hand in MS Kaufman A532 f. 93r, apparently the same mentioned by Jacob Goldenthal as appearing in an MS belonging to Alexander Ziskind Mintz of Brody (1813-1866). Goldenthal printed a text edited from 3 manuscripts in Vienna, 1851. A modern critical edition was in progress as of 2003.
- Nine stanzas not included in Goldenthal's edition of Miqdash Me'at (MS Cambridge Add. 1193 f. 39v-40r)
- Iggeret (or Melitzat) Ya'ar haLevanon. In heavily poetic prose. Apparently incomplete. Many MSS, but especially Joseph Almanzi's redaction in MS BL Add. 27001. Edited and translated into Italian by Alessandro Guetta in REJ 164, "Ya'ar Ha-Levanon, ou la quête de la connaissance perdue" (2005).
- Elegy ("ḳinah") on his wife, who died at the age of seventy after fifty-two years of married life, Sella (Zilla, Zippora, Sarah) (צילה). Various MSS; printed in Gli ebrei a Perugia (1975) pp. 273–275, and edited by Alessandro Guetta in Teuda vol. XIX pp. 309-327.
- A poem beginning Begodel erekh hahigayon (MS Bod. Mich. 746, f. 114r)
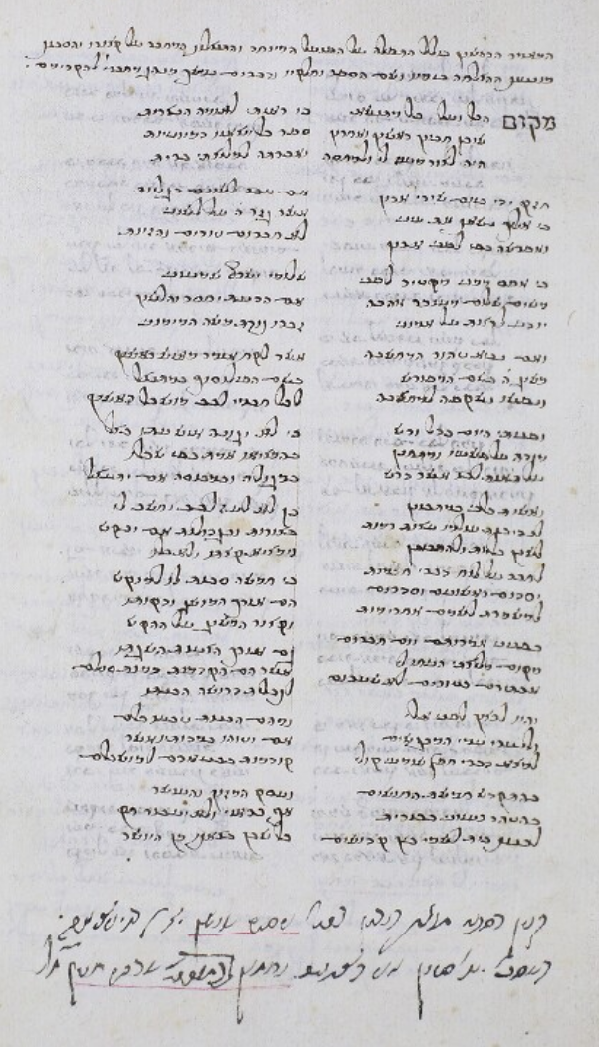
  1565 manuscript of Miqdash Me'at from Anghiari in the Bodleian Library

=== Prose ===
- Various medical writings, including a commentary on Hippocrates' Aphorisms. One MS published by Joshua Leibowitz and Solomon Marcus in Kiryat Sefer vol. XLII, pp. 246-251.
- Commentary on Ibn Rushd (Averroes)'s works, completed in 1456-7 (holograph MS Conv. Soppr. 12), commentary on Moses Narboni's commentary on Ghazali's Maḳaṣid al-Falasifah, shorter Hebrew philosophical tracts, aphorisms
- Notes on Levi ben Gershon's commentaries on Averroes (Neubauer, "Cat. Bodl. Hebr. MSS." Nos. 1373, 1389)
- Notes on Averroes' commentary on the Isagoge of Porphyry (De Rossi MSS., Parma, Nos. 458, 1, 12,009, 1).
- An extensive philosophical work in Judaeo-Latin, apparently incomplete. Published as Filosofia Naturale e Fatti de Deo by Irene Hijmans-Tromp. Brill, 1989.
- Polemic against John of Capistrano (MS Bod. Mich. 291, f. 174v ff.)
- A philosophical-theological work, apologetic in tendency, written in Italian and divided into three parts. The first part discusses the natural philosophy of Aristotle; the second is a treatise upon God; the third, of which only a fragment has been preserved, covers Jewish history from the beginning to the time of the author
- An apologetic work, in sixty-two chapters, directed against friar Giannozzo Manetti, the secretary of Nicholas V and Pope Callixtus III, who preached anti-Jewish sermons at Rome (Neubauer, "Cat. Bodl. Hebr. MSS." No. 818, 2)
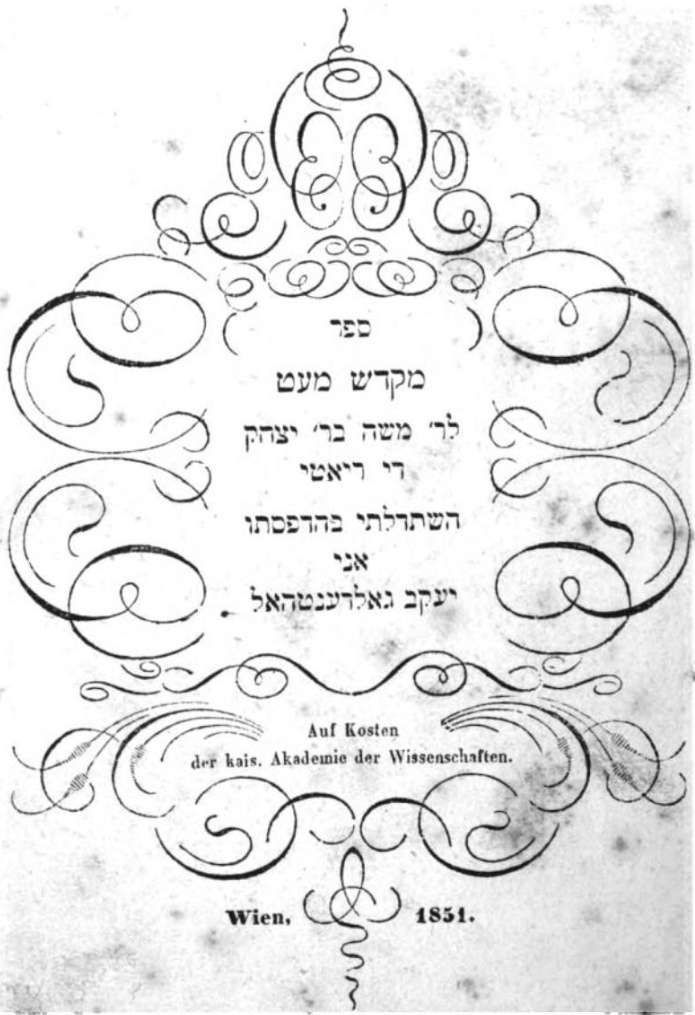
  Title page of the Miqdash Me'at (Vienna, 1851)

== Jewish Encyclopedia bibliography ==
- Zunz, in Geiger's Jüd. Zeit. ii. 321–322;
- Luzzatto, in Dukes' Ehrensäulen, p. 50;
- Carmoly, in Jost's Annalen, i. 55, 63;
- idem, in Orient, Lit. ii. 234;
- Steinschneider, Cat. Bodl. col. 1984;
- idem, Hebr. Uebers. pp. 28, 76, 462, 660;
- Berliner, Gesch. der Juden in Rom, ii. 121;
- Güdemann, Gesch. ii. 127;
- Vogelstein and Rieger, Gesch. der Juden in Rom, ii. 68 et seq.
