= Campagna internment camp =

Italian WW2 concentration camp

Coordinates: 40.6670°N 15.1068°E

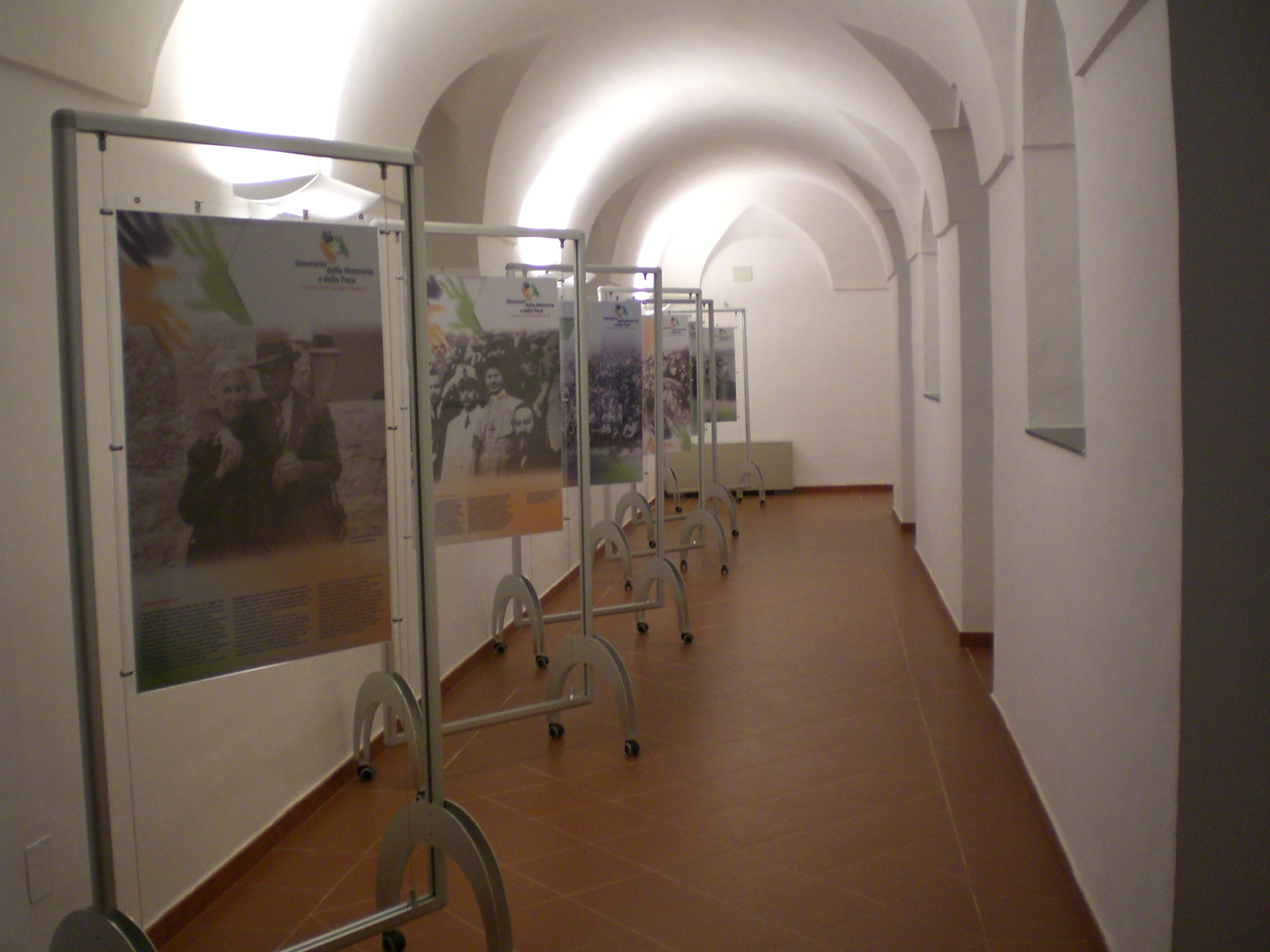
Itinerario della Memoria e della Pace

Campagna internment camp, located in Campagna, a town near Salerno in Southern Italy, was an internment camp for Jews and foreigners established by Benito Mussolini in 1940.

The first internees were 430 men captured in different parts of Italy. Most of them were Jewish refugees came from Germany, Austria, Poland, Czechoslovakia and Dalmatia, there were also some British citizens and a group of 40 French and Italian Jews. The number of inmates during the three years varied considerably, ranging between 230 (February 1941) and 150 (September 1943).

The camp was never a concentration camp in the German sense of the term. Internees were allowed to receive food parcels and visit sick relatives. In addition, there were no mail restrictions. None of the internees was killed or subjected to violence. In fact, the internees were constantly protected from deportation to Germany, as the Nazis requested. Prisoners were allowed to organize a library, school, theatre and a synagogue.

All of the prisoners were free to move through the streets and houses of the town, as they were welcomed by the inhabitants of Campagna as friends. Such bonds of friendship were created that many prisoners had lunch at the home of local friends. That also involved Mayor Carlino d'Ambrosio and the local fascist authorities, who kept the activities hidden from the higher authorities.

An essential role was played by the Bishop of Campagna, Giuseppe Maria Palatucci, and his nephew Giovanni Palatucci, Quaestor of Fiume, who, by sending as many Istrian Jews as possible into the Campagna camp, saved thousands from the death camps.

In September 1943, Italy capitulated and the Allied troops invaded Southern Italy. In response, the German troops invaded Italy from the North. However, when they got to the Campagna concentration camp, all the inmates had already fled to the mountains with the help of the local inhabitants.

== History ==
Following provisions issued by the government, suitable structures for the detention of opponents of the fascist regime that were not in areas close to ports, important roads, railway lines, airports, or weapon factories were sought throughout Italy. On September 8, 1939, it was proposed to the Ministry of the Interior to locate the camp in two disused barracks in the Campagna area - the former Dominican Convent of San Bartolomeo and the former Convent of the Observants of the Immaculate Conception.

== Buildings ==
The structures were owned by the municipality and were used by the Military District of Campagna, once a year for the Royal Army officer cadets, for practical field exercises. After ensuring their availability, the Prefect of Salerno carried out ordinary maintenance work.

=== San Bartolomeo Barracks ===
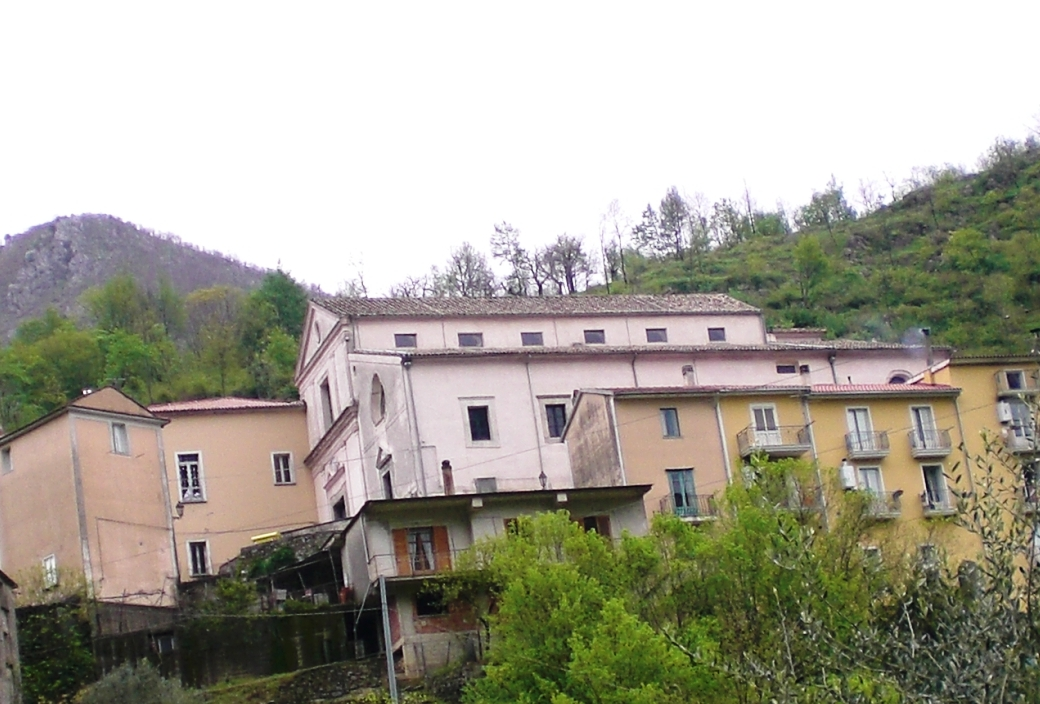
The former convent complex of San Bartolomeo

The barracks are a former 15th-century Dominican convent built in the San Bartolomeo district in the valley of the Atri River. It was chosen because it was deemed to be suitable for housing prisoners, was in a position that could be monitored easily and had few access points. The building had three levels; during its use it had five large dormitories, four small dormitories, four large rooms, three small rooms, four corridors, kitchens, pantries and warehouses. Equipped with water and electric light, it could house approximately 450 people, in addition to the guardhouse with accommodation for an NCO and six carabinieri.

=== Convent of the Observants of the Immaculate Conception ===
Built starting in the sixteenth century on a clay hill to the northeast of the Casalenuovo district, it was remodeled several times following landslides that led to its demolition in the mid-1980s. The structure consisted of a two-story building with a central colonnaded cloister and frescoes of Franciscan life. The interior consisted of three large dormitories and about twenty small rooms. During the twenty years of fascism, the structure housed a guardhouse with accommodation for an NCO and six carabinieri. The surrounding area has currently been recovered with the consolidation of the underlying terracing and the rearrangement of the arches of the convent cloister.

== Internees ==
The first prisoners were 340 men captured in various parts of Italy. Most of them were Jewish refugees from Nazi Germany, Austria, Poland, Czechoslovakia and Rijeka, Croatia. The number of inmates during the three years varied considerably, ranging between 230 (February 1941) and 150 (September 1943).

In spite of everything happening around them, living conditions in the camp were relatively good. In October 1941, the then-secretary of the National Fascist Party wrote a letter to the then-head of police in which he complained about "too much freedom in which the Jewish internees of the Campagna concentration camp live" and asked for "consequent measures by the regime's police forces."

Prisoners were allowed to receive visits and enjoy the assistance, offered in forms of food clothing and money, offered to them by DELASEM, an Italian and Jewish resistance organization. Only two of them were said to have died during the three years of its use as a concentration camp, and were buried in the city cemetery with funeral rites celebrated by two rabbis. Among the prisoners there were many Jewish doctors who began to treat the locals, even though this was forbidden. Among the various prisoners was Russian-Italian painter Aleksandr Degai, who painted several works there and gave them to various citizens.

Prisoners were free to move around the town but not to leave it. In fact, they were welcomed by the locals as friends. This also involved initiatives taken by mayor Carlino d'Ambrosio and other local fascists to hide this freedom from their superiors. Additionally, the Bishop of Campagna, Giuseppe Maria Palatucci and his nephew Giovanni, the police chief, who saved thousands of Istrian Jews by sending them to the Campagna camp instead of the extermination camps.

To ease the detention of the inmates, a library was set up and an association football team was created that occasionally played with external teams. There was also a small synagogue set up in San Bartolomeo and, for a period, at the bishop's invitation, an interned pianist played the organ in the church during Sunday mass.

On September 8, 1943, when the Allied troops arrived in Salerno, German troops stationed there headed towards the camp to execute the prisoners. When they arrived, however, they found the camp empty; the prisoners had previously been warned by the locals and fled into the mountains.

Including a former Jewish refugee, about 300 civilians died in two heavy bombings conducted jointly by the British and Americans. After the liberation on September 19, 1943, a refugee camp managed by the Allies was set up in the San Bartolomeo barracks building.

== See also ==
- Holocaust in Italy
- List of Italian concentration camps
