= Isacco Pesaro Maurogonato =

- Maurogonato in 1892

Senator of the Kingdom of Italy
- In office 4 December 1890 – 5 April 1892
- Monarch: Umberto I

Vice President of the Chamber of Deputies
- In office 10 June 1886 – 22 October 1890
- In office 26 May 1880 – 2 October 1882
- In office 23 November 1874 – 7 March 1878

Member of the Chamber of Deputies of the Kingdom of Italy
- In office 18 November 1865 – 22 October 1890
- Constituency: Mirano (1865–1882); Venice II (1882–1890)

Minister of Finance and Commerce of the Republic of San Marco
- In office March 1849 – August 1849
- President: Daniele Manin

Personal details
- Born: Isacco Pesaro; 26 November 1817 Venice, Kingdom of Lombardy–Venetia, Austrian Empire
- Died: 5 April 1892 (aged 74) Rome, Kingdom of Italy
- Resting place: Jewish Cemetery of the Lido
- Party: Historical Right
- Spouse: Bersabea Ascoli (m. 1850; d. 1858)
- Children: 4
- Parents: Israel Pesaro (father); Allegra Mulli (mother); David Maurogonato (adoptive father)
- Relatives: Graziadio Isaia Ascoli (brother-in-law)
- Education: University of Padua (Laurea in Law)
- Occupation: Politician; financier; economist
- Awards: Commander of the Order of Saints Maurice and Lazarus; Commander of the Order of the Crown of Italy

Isacco Pesaro Maurogonato (November 26, 1817 – April 5, 1892) was a Jewish Italian politician and financier from Venice.

== Life ==
Maurogonago was born on November 26, 1817, in Venice, the Kingdom of Lombardy–Venetia, the son of Israel Pesaro of Ferrara and Allegra Mulli of Corfu. Adopted by his mother's cousin David Maurogonato, he added the cousin's surname to his own.

Maurogonato graduated from the University of Padua in 1838, with his thesis Intorno al duello published in 1839. He returned to Venice in 1839 and began working in the law office of General Insurance while also working at his father's commercial business. He also commenced further studies in finance and political economy, and through his brother David (who worked in the law office of Daniele Manin) he first met Manin and Niccolò Tommaseo.

During the Revolutions of 1848, when Venice proclaimed the Republic of San Marco, Maurogonato was appointed Postmaster-General of Venice and then a member of the financial commission. In 1849, he was named Minister of Finance and Commerce. He was also elected to the Assembly. As Minister, he was Manin and Tommaseo's right-hand man and successfully supplied the Republic with funds to fight in the First Italian War of Independence. When the Austrians retook Venice and examined the municipal accounts, they were surprised to see the accounts were accurate, with General Gorskowski exclaiming "I never could have believed the rascally Republicans were so honest!" Maurogonato was one of forty men exempted from amnesty upon the failure of the Revolutions, and he went into exile to Corfu. He later returned to Venice at the Austrians' invitation to avoid the confiscation of his property.

In 1852, Maurogonato became a director of the Civic Savings Bank and the Venetian Merchant Establishment. In 1866, when Venice joined the Kingdom of Italy following the Third Italian War of Independence, he was elected deputy to the Chamber of Deputies. He served in the 9th through 16th Legislature, from 1866 to 1890. He sat with the conservatives and served as vice-president of the Chamber from 1874 to 1890. In 1884, when the government proposed the recognition of loans made to the Venetian revolutionary government from 1848-1849, he turned over his own 16,000 francs claims to the city of Venice since he didn't want to advocate such a proposal for his own financial gain. He declined several offers to serve as Minister of Finance, but in 1890 King Umberto I appointed him to the Senate.

A devout Jew, Maurogonato was concerned with the welfare of his fellow Jews and was especially active on behalf of the Jewish communities in Venice and Rome. In 1850, he married Bersabea (Betty) Ascoli, sister of linguist Graziadio Isaia Ascoli. Their children were Letizia, Elena, Ernesta (wife of Marco Besso), and Adele.

Maurogonato died in Rome on April 5, 1892. He was buried in the Jewish Cemetery on Venice Lido.
