= If Not Now, When? (novel) =

1982 novel by Primo Levi

- First edition
- Author: Primo Levi
- Original title: Se non ora, quando?
- Translator: William Weaver
- Language: Italian
- Publisher: Einaudi (Italian); Summit Books (English)
- Publication date: 1982
- Publication place: Italy
- English publication date: 1985
- Media type: Print (Hardcover) and (Paperback)
- Pages: 331
- ISBN: 0-14-118390-X
- OCLC: 44152986

If Not Now, When? is a novel by the Italian author Primo Levi, first published in 1982 under the title Se non ora, quando?

== Title ==
The title is taken from a well-known rabbinical saying attributed to Hillel the Elder: "If I am not for myself, who will be for me? And when I am for myself, what am 'I'? And if not now, when?" (see also Pirkei Avot).

== Plot ==
The story follows a number of Jewish partisans and resistance fighters as they struggle to survive and sabotage the German war machine behind Nazi lines during World War II, starting in the western Soviet Union (Byelorossiya) and ending in Milan.

The book's chief protagonist, Mendel Nachmanovich Dajcher, worked as a watch repairer before joining the Red Army, where he fought in the artillery. Bevor he went into the war, his wife Rivke and shtetl had been massacred by a German Einsatzgruppe. In the midst of battle, he loses his regiment, becomes disoriented and is overtaken by the front, separated from and unsupported by Soviet forces.

His life thereafter is an odyssey through the "partisanka", the motley partisan movement, which includes Russians, Jews, Lithuanians and Poles. About halfway through the book, Mendel and his companion from the first chapter, Leonid, fall in with a group of Jewish resistance fighters called the gedalistas, after their leader: Gedale.

With them, Mendel traverses Poland and, overtaken by the victorious Soviets, enters defeated Germany. From there, the group aims for Italy, dreaming of making the aliyah to Palestine to take part in the Zionist project of reclaiming a Jewish homeland.

== Reception ==
If Not Now, When? won the Campiello and Viareggio prizes the year of its publication.

The critic Adam Kirsch rates Levi's Holocaust writing including If Not Now, When? as his primary literary contribution, but doesn't see the book as one of Levi's classics, like If This Is a Man, The Drowned and the Saved and The Periodic Table. He disagrees with the assessment of Ann Goldstein that "the label Holocaust writer does him a regrettable injustice". Kirsch's assessment is that Levi "had no real gift for inventing plot and character—a lack that comes across most clearly in his one real novel, If Not Now, When. Where he excelled was recording and reflecting on his own experience; and inevitably the experience that engrossed his imagination was Auschwitz."

== Background ==
In his nonfiction, Levi described himself as a largely ineffectual partisan. He joined a group of inexperienced resistance fighters near Turin, was captured shortly thereafter, and soon sent to Auschwitz.

== Sources ==
- Kirsch, Adam (September 20, 2015). "Primo Levi's Unlikely Suicide Haunts His Lasting Work". The Tablet.
