= Raymond Rosenthal =

American translator

Raymond B. Rosenthal (December 19, 1914 – July 24, 1995) was an American translator, best known for translating the Italian works of Primo Levi into the English language. He died of lung cancer. He also translated works by Pietro Aretino, Tommaso Landolfi, Aldo Busi, Gabriele D'Annunzio, Vasco Pratolini, Pietro Citati, Giovanni Verga and Pietro Redondi.

== Works in English translation ==
- Tommaso Landolfi - Gogol’s Wife and Other Stories, (New Directions, 1963)
- Vasco Pratolini - Bruno Santini (Little, Brown, 1964)
- Mario Tobino - The Underground (Heinemann, 1966)
- Vasco Pratolini - Metello (Little, Brown, 1968)
- Tommaso Landolfi - Cancerqueen (Dial Press, 1971)
- Pietro Aretino - Dialogues (Allen and Unwin, 1972)
- Pietro Citati - Goethe (Dial Press, 1974)
- Giovanni Verga - The House of the Medlar Tree (New American Library, 1975)
- Simone Pétremont - Simone Weil: A life (Pantheon Books, 1976)
- Pietro Citati - Tolstoy (Schocken Books, 1986)
- Pietro Citati - Kafka (Knopf, 1990)
- Primo Levi - The Sixth Day and Other Tales (Summit, 1990)
- Primo Levi - Periodic Table (Schoken Books, 1984)
- Pietro Redondi - Galileo: heretic, (Princeton University Press, 1987)
- Gabriele D'Annunzio - Nocturne and Five Tales of Love and Death (Marlboro, 1988)
- Primo Levi - Other People's Trades (Summit Books, 1989)
- Aldo Busi - The Standard Life of a Temporary Pantyhose Salesman (New York, Farrar, Straus & Giroux, 1988; London, Faber and Faber, 1990)
- Primo Levi - The Drowned and the Saved (Summit Books, 1988)
- Primo Levi - The Mirror Maker (Schoken Books, 1989)
- Primo Levi - Other People's Trades (Summit Books, 1989)
- Franco Ferrucci - The Life of God (as told by himself) (University of Chicago Press, 1996)
