= The Wrench =

Novel by Primo Levi

The Wrench (The Monkey's Wrench)
- First edition
- Author: Primo Levi
- Original title: La chiave a stella
- Translator: William Weaver
- Language: Italian
- Publisher: Einaudi (Italian); Summit Books (English)
- Publication date: 1978
- Publication place: Italy
- English publication date: 1987
- Media type: Print
- Pages: 171
- ISBN: 0-671-62214-5
- OCLC: 18683658

The Wrench, published in the U.S. under the title of The Monkey's Wrench, is a novel by Primo Levi about a construction worker and a chemist who swap stories about their everyday lives while based at a remote workcamp. First published as La Chiave a Stella by Einaudi in 1978, it was published in English translation in 1987.

The book was written after Levi had retired from the family paint business SIVA and is semi-autobiographical. It takes the form of interconnected stories exchanged between the two main characters. In this, it is similar to Levi's collection of connected memoir stories, The Periodic Table. It also shares that book's interest in "what Levi would call the homo faber, man as maker or tool-maker".

== Content ==
The two characters are a skilled Rigger named Libertino (Tino) Faussone and an industrial chemist. The book is set in a remote work camp where there is little to do in the evenings except tell stories. The scene is loosely based upon Togliattigrad, the Fiat camp set up in Russia to build a car factory. Most of the stories are told by Faussone about his work travelling the world to troubleshoot complex construction problems. These stories appeal to the chemist, who sees himself as a kind of rigger.

One story concerns Faussone trying to sort out a problem with an acetic acid separation column. It turns out the ceramic contents of the column have disintegrated and have formed a sludge at the bottom. This is precisely what happened at SIVA to a column that Levi designed.

In another story, in the chapter "Offshore", Faussone recalls the launch of an oil rig in Alaska and compares it with his father's trade as a coppersmith and the love they both have for their own particular craft. His father's work is also the subject of the chapter "Beating Copper".

Other stories include the chemist's account of developing a paint-coating for the inside of cans that is strong enough to hold Russian anchovies and Faussone's account of a chimpanzee helping him to build a derrick, this being the story that gives the book its title.

== Reception ==
Commentators agree that it is the happiest and most humorous of Levi's works. It has even been described as a comic novel. However, many Italian leftist critics criticised the book for presenting such a positive picture of manual and industrial work.

The New York Times commented on the subtlety of the stories, "seemingly so simple yet as complex as any of Faussone's riggings or the chemist's experiments". However, Kirkus Reviews found them "almost too subtle", noting that "the book threatens to evanesce completely now and then."
