= Moments of Reprieve =

1981 book by Primo Levi

- First edition
- Author: Primo Levi
- Original title: Lilit e altri racconti
- Translator: Ruth Feldman
- Publisher: Einaudi
- Publication date: 1981
- Publication place: United Kingdom
- English publication date: 1986
- Media type: Print (Hardcover) and (Paperback)
- Pages: 172
- ISBN: 0-14-118389-6
- OCLC: 45990565

Moments of Reprieve is a book of autobiographical character studies/vignettes by Primo Levi.

The book features fifteen character studies of people the author met during his time in the Auschwitz concentration camp. Some of the vignettes feature characters who have already appeared in If This Is a Man and The Truce, Levi's initial two Holocaust memoirs. Other vignettes feature characters and stories that did not fit into the narratives of the two memoirs, but which Levi felt had merit in their own right.

They are the moments that helped him overcome his circumstances, either physically (through actual salvation from death, or helping him avoid it, e.g. by obtaining extra food) or more spiritually, through human interaction restoring his faith in his fellow man.
