= Lorenzo Perrone =

Italian mason who saved Primo Levi's life in Auschwitz (1904–1952)

- Born: September 12, 1904; Fossano, Italy
- Died: April 30, 1952 (aged 47); Savigliano, Italy
- Occupation: mason
- Known for: saving Primo Levi's life in Auschwitz
- Honours: Righteous among the Nations

Lorenzo Perrone (12 September 1904 – 30 April 1952) born in Fossano, Italy, was an Italian mason who was transferred by his company to work at the Auschwitz concentration camp in 1944. There he met and befriended Jewish-Italian prisoner Primo Levi for whom he provided food and other assistance. After the war, he struggled to cope with what he had witnessed in Auschwitz and became an alcoholic, eventually dying of tuberculosis in 1952.

Levi credited Perrone with saving his life and named both of his children after him. Additionally, Levi wrote about Perrone in his books, including If This Is A Man (1947) and Moments of Reprieve (1981). Perrone has been recognized as one of the Righteous among the Nations by Yad Vashem, and Un uomo di poche parole. A biography about him was published in 2023.

== Early life ==
Perrone was born on 12 September 1904 in Fossano, Italy, to a family with five other children. He had difficulty with writing and only completed three years of primary school. When he was ten years old, he began working and later served as a bersagliere in the 7th Regiment of Brescia. He became a migrant worker, often crossing into France with his brother to work as a bricklayer. Once Italy joined World War II on the side of the Axis Powers in June 1940, entering France for work was more difficult.

== Auschwitz ==
Perrone was a chief mason under contract to the Boetti company, who was transferred to work at the Auschwitz concentration camp. As a civilian worker, Perrone was given better food and lodging than the prisoners and allowed to send and receive mail. He opposed the actions of the Nazis that he saw at Auschwitz and, at great risk to himself, helped several prisoners. According to Primo Levi's biographer Ian Thomson, Perrone's kindness was due in part to the cultural values of his hometown; Perrone's parish priest stated "In Lorenzo’s day the bricklayers and fishermen of Fossano went out of their way to help the weakest in the community".

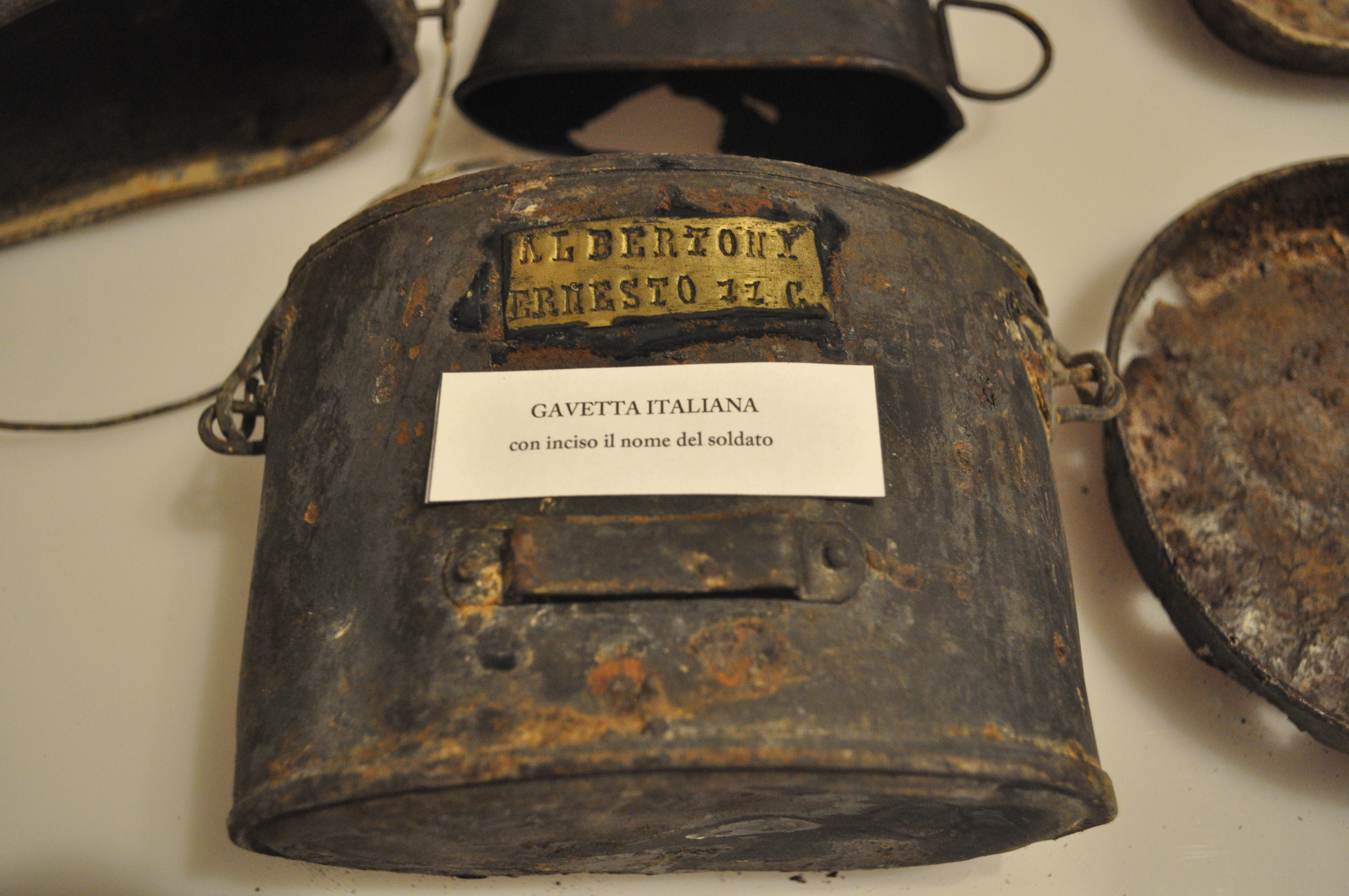
Italian military mess kit

The most famous prisoner he helped was the Jewish-Italian prisoner Primo Levi. In the middle of 1944, Levi was assigned to be Perrone's brick-laying assistant. Levi, a native of Turin, heard Perrone speak in the Piemontese language with a colleague of his, and a friendship between the two developed. Until December of the same year, Perrone gave Levi about 500 calories from his own soup ration every day, greatly increasing Levi's chances of survival. Brought in Perrone's mess kit, the soup consisted of scraps like potato peels, sparrow's wings, and salami rind. Perrone also gave Levi a patched garment he would wear under the camp uniform to increase the protection from cold. Additionally, Perrone sent postcards to Levi's mother in Italy. Levi composed the messages in such a way that his mother would understand that he was still alive but the Nazi censors would not suspect that the postcard was coming from a prisoner. To avoid detection, Perrone wrote Levi's messages in his own handwriting and signed them with his name. Levi's mother was able to send some messages and a food parcel to Levi via Perrone.

As news of the Soviet Red Army's advance reached Auschwitz, Perrone escaped on foot with another Italian in late December. Five months later Perrone visited Levi's mother and sister in Turin and told them he thought that it was unlikely that Levi had survived Auschwitz. He then travelled another 100 km to his hometown, where he engaged in binge drinking and refused to speak to his brother about where he had been. By that time, Auschwitz had been liberated by the Soviets, and Levi was in fact alive and regaining his health in a Soviet camp in Katowice, Poland. Unsure if his family was still living, Levi sent them a long letter in June in which he mentioned Perrone: "Nobody knows how much I owe that man; I could never repay him."

== Post-war and death ==
In the years after the war, Perrone struggled to return to his normal life and suffered from alcoholism. What he witnessed in Auschwitz had impacted him so much that, according to his parish priest, he stopped believing in God and, according to Levi, he lost his will to live. In December 1945, Levi visited Perrone in Fossano. Perrone refused to speak about Auschwitz and told Levi to leave. Levi found him a masonry job in Turin, but Perrone had no interest in it.

After Perrone contracted tuberculosis, Levi arranged for him to be hospitalized in Savigliano and brought him warm clothes. Over the next six months, Perrone left the hospital several times to find alcohol. One day he was found nearly dead in a ditch. He was brought back to the hospital where he died on 30 April 1952 of tuberculosis and bronchial pneumonia, but Levi credited his death to suicide. At Perrone's funeral, Levi stated: "I believe that it is really due to Lorenzo that I am alive today."

== Legacy ==
In homage to Perrone, Levi named his children Lisa Lorenza and Renzo Cesare. Levi, who published several works after Auschwitz, wrote about Perrone in several of them, including If This Is A Man (1947) and Moments of Reprieve (1981).

In If This Is a Man, Levi wrote:

I believe that it was really due to Lorenzo that I am alive today; and not so much for his material aid, as for his having constantly reminded me by his presence, by his natural and plain manner of being good, that there still existed a just world outside our own, something and someone still pure and whole, not corrupt, not savage, extraneous to hatred and terror; something difficult to define, a remote possibility of good, but for which it was worth surviving. [...] But Lorenzo was a man; his humanity was pure and uncontaminated, he was outside this world of negation. Thanks to Lorenzo, I managed not to forget that I myself was a man.”

In an interview, published posthumously by The Paris Review in 1995, Levi described Perrone as:

a very silent man. He refused my thanks. He almost didn’t reply to my words. He just shrugged: Take the bread. Take the sugar. Keep silent, you don’t need to speak. Afterward, when I tried to rescue him, he was difficult to reach, to talk to him. He was . . . very ignorant, almost illiterate, hardly able to write. He was not religious; he didn’t know the gospel, but instinctively he tried to rescue people, not for pride, not for glory, but out of a good heart and for human comprehension. He asked me once in very laconic words: Why are we in the world if not to help each other?

Yad Vashem designated Perrone as Righteous among the Nations on June 7, 1998. In 2004, a plaque honoring Perrone was placed on Viale delle Alpi, a street in Fossano. Piedmontese historian Carlo Greppi published a biography of Perrone entitled Un uomo di poche parole [A Man of Few Words] in 2023. In an interview about the book Greppi asked: "What would our perception of the Shoah have been like if Levi hadn't survived the concentration camp and hadn't left us his testimonies?"
