= The Voice of Memory =

- First edition
- Author: Primo Levi
- Original title: Primo Levi: Conversazioni e interviste
- Translator: Robert Gordon
- Language: Italian
- Publisher: Einaudi (Italy); Polity (UK); The New Press (US)
- Publication date: 1997
- Publication place: Italy
- English publication date: 2000
- Media type: Print (Hardcover) and (Hardcover)
- Pages: 306
- ISBN: 1-56584-711-3
- OCLC: 155512010

The Voice of Memory is a 1997 collection of interviews, originally published in Primo Levi: Conversazioni e interviste.
