= Auschwitz Report =

Auschwitz Report may refer to:

- Auschwitz Protocols, also known as the Auschwitz Reports or Auschwitz Report, a collection of three eyewitness reports about Auschwitz
  - Vrba–Wetzler report, sometimes referred to alone as the Auschwitz Report
- Auschwitz Report (book), a 2006 book about Auschwitz by Leonardo de Benedetti and Primo Levi
- The Auschwitz Report, 2021 film

== See also ==
- Pilecki's Report, an official report made earlier than the Auschwitz Protocols, in 1943 by Witold Pilecki
