= The Drowned and the Saved =

1986 book of essays by Primo Levi

The Drowned and The Saved
- First edition
- Author: Primo Levi
- Original title: I sommersi e i salvati
- Translator: Raymond Rosenthal
- Language: Italian
- Publisher: Einaudi (Italian); Summit Books (English)
- Publication date: 1986
- Publication place: Italy
- English publication date: 1988
- Media type: Print (Hardcover) and (Paperback)
- Pages: 170
- ISBN: 0-349-10047-0
- OCLC: 59150087

The Drowned and the Saved (Italian: I sommersi e i salvati) is a book of essays by Italian-Jewish author and Holocaust survivor Primo Levi on life and death in the Nazi extermination camps, drawing on his experience as a survivor of Auschwitz (Monowitz). The author's last work, written in 1986, a year before his death, The Drowned and the Saved is an attempt at an analytical approach, in contrast to his earlier books If This Is a Man (1947) and The Truce (1963), which are autobiographical.

== Contents ==
Preface

1. The Memory of the Offense
2. The Grey Zone
3. Shame
4. Communicating
5. Useless Violence
6. The Intellectual in Auschwitz
7. Stereotypes
8. Letters from Germans

Conclusion

== Miscellaneous ==
The title of one essay (The Grey Zone) was used as title for the film The Grey Zone (2001), which is based on a book by Miklós Nyiszli.

== See also ==
- Social Darwinism
