= The Search for Roots =

- First edition
- Author: Primo Levi
- Original title: La ricerca delle radici
- Translator: Peter Forbes
- Cover artist: M. C. Escher; Sphere Spirals, 1958
- Language: Italian
- Publisher: Einaudi (Italian); Allen Lane (English)
- Publication date: 1981
- Publication place: Italy
- English publication date: 2001
- Media type: Print (Paperback)
- Pages: 234
- ISBN: 1-56663-504-7
- OCLC: 69243948

The Search for Roots: A Personal Anthology is a compilation of thirty pieces of prose and poetry selected by Italian-Jewish author and Holocaust survivor Primo Levi as part of an abortive project by his original Italian publisher Einaudi to identify the texts which most influenced major Italian writers.

== Contents ==
1. "The Just Man Oppressed by Injustice": "The Book of Job", The Bible
2. "A Man of No Account": Homer, New Coasts and Poseidon's Son, The Odyssey
3. "Why are Animals Beautiful?": Charles Darwin, The Origin of Species
4. "To See Atoms": Sir William Bragg, Concerning the Nature of Things
5. "The Pact with the Mammoths": Joseph-Henri Rosny, La Guerre du Feu
6. "The Hobbies": Giuseppe Parini, "The Day"
7. "A Deadly Nip": Carlo Porta, "Olter Desgrazzi de Giovannin Bongee"
8. "Dystopia": Jonathan Swift, Gulliver's Travels
9. "A Testing Time": Joseph Conrad, "Youth"
10. "The Words of the Father": Ludwig Gattermann, Laboratory Methods of Organic Chemistry
11. "Better to Write of Laughter Than Tears": François Rabelais, Gargantua and Pantagruel
12. "A Different Way of Saying 'I'": Thomas Mann, Joseph and His Brothers#The Tales of Jacob
13. "The Romance of Technology": Roger Vercel, Tug-Boat
14. "The Dark Well of the Human Spirit": Herman Melville, Moby Dick
15. "Survivors in the Sahara": Antoine de Saint-Exupéry, Wind, Sand and Stars
16. "The Curious Merchant": Marco Polo, The Travels
17. "The Poet-Researcher": Lucretius, On the Nature of the Universe
18. "The Jew on Horseback": Isaac Babel, Collected Stories
19. "An Irrepressible Quibbler": Sholem Aleichem, Tevye the Dairyman and the Railroad Stories
20. "Pity Hidden beneath Laughter": Giuseppe Belli, The Sonnets
21. "Why We are Not Happy": Bertrand Russell, The Conquest of Happiness
22. "We are the Aliens": Fredric Brown, "Sentry"
23. "The Measure of All Things": ASTM D 1382 - 55 T, American Society for Testing Materials
24. "Urchin Death": Stefano D'Arrigo, Horcynus Orca
25. "TV According to Leonardo": Arthur C. Clarke, Profiles of the Future: An Enquiry into the Limits of the Possible
26. "Before and after the Crime": T. S. Eliot, Murder in the Cathedral
27. "Death Fugue": Paul Celan, Poems of Paul Celan
28. "Tonie the Winterer": Mario Rigoni Stern, The Story of Tönle
29. "Trying to Understand": Hermann Langbein, Menschen in Auschwitz
30. "We are Alone": Kip S. Thorne, The Search for Black Holes
- "Afterword": The Four Paths of Primo Levi by Italo Calvino
