= Six Day War (disambiguation) =

The Six-Day War was an armed conflict between Israel and a coalition of Arab states in 1967.

"Six Day War" may also refer to:

- Six Days' Campaign (1814) between Napoleon and forces from the Sixth Coalition
- Six-Day War (1899) between the British Empire and punti clans in British Hong Kong
- War in Abkhazia (1998) between Abkhaz secessionist forces and Georgian guerillas
- Six-Day War (2000) between Rwanda and Uganda, during the Second Congo War

== See also ==
- Six days (disambiguation)
- The Sixth Day (disambiguation)
