= Stuart Woolf =

English-Italian historian (1936–2021)

Stuart Joseph Woolf (23 January 1936 – 1 May 2021) was an English-Italian historian.

Woolf was emeritus professor of contemporary history at the Ca' Foscari University of Venice, where he had taught from 1996 to 2006. Prior to this he taught at the European University Institute in Florence from 1984 to 1992 and at the University of Essex where he was Foundation Professor of History beginning in 1975. He previously held appointments at the University of Reading and Pembroke College in the University of Cambridge. He also held a number of visiting appointments at European, American and Australian universities, including Columbia University in New York and the École des hautes études en sciences sociales in Paris.

Educated at St Marylebone Grammar School he attended Merton College in the University of Oxford, graduating in 1956. Tutored by Roger Highfield and J. M. Roberts, he subsequently undertook research toward a doctoral degree under the supervision of H. R. Trevor-Roper. His research was on the domestic economic practices of three early modern aristocratic families in Piedmont during the seventeenth and eighteenth centuries. Woolf submitted his thesis and received his DPhil in 1960. During this period he formed a close relationship with the noted scholar of the Enlightenment Franco Venturi. A year at St. Antony's College, Oxford, in the company of its warden William Deakin, combined with Venturi's influence, turned his interests to modern and contemporary history, in particular to the history of Fascism and its opponents.

In the 1970s and 1980s, while at Essex and the EUI, Woolf expanded his interests to include Europe under Napoleon, the use of statistics in the age of the French Revolution, the history of poverty, and the comparative history of Nationalism.

== Personal life ==
Woolf was born and grew up in London, in an orthodox Jewish family, the youngest of three sons of Adolph Woolf (1898-1983), a furrier, and Regina Woolf (née Frei, 1907-1996), a native of Metz who grew up in Luxembourg. His eldest brother Cyril became a physician and emigrated to Canada; another brother, David, became a scholar of Italian literature at the Australian National University.

Woolf was married to the former Anna Debenedetti (b. 1931), whom he met while doing his thesis research in Italy. They married in 1959 and had one child, Deborah Clare, in 1963. It was through this family connection that he became acquainted with Auschwitz survivor and the Holocaust author Primo Levi whose books If This Is a Man (United States title: Survival in Auschwitz) and The Truce (titled The Reawakening in the US) he translated into English with Levi's agreement and collaboration. These are among the most widely-read insider accounts of the Holocaust and Woolf's translation of The Truce was awarded a share of the John Florio Prize in Italian translation in 1966.

Woolf's nephew is the British-Canadian historian and academic administrator Daniel Woolf. Stuart Woolf supervised many graduate students at all of the institutions at which he worked. He died of pneumonia in Florence.

Woolf died from COVID-19 in 2021.

== Books (select) ==
- A History of Italy 1700-1860
- State and Statistics in France, 1789-1815 (with J.-C. Perrot)
- Italian Public Enterprise (with M.V. Posner)
- Napoleon's Integration of Europe
- The Poor in Western Europe in the Eighteenth and Nineteenth Centuries
- (ed. with H.-G. Haupt and M.G. Müller), Regional and National Identities in Europe in the XIXth and XXth Centuries/Les Identités régionales et nationales en Europe aux XIXe et Xxe Siècles
- (ed.) The World of the Peasantry. Le monde da la Paysannerie
- (ed.) Domestic Strategies: Work and Family in France and Italy 1600-1800
- (ed.) Fascism in Europe
