= Other People's Trades =

1985 collection of essays by Primo Levi

- First edition (Italian)
- Author: Primo Levi
- Original title: L'altrui mestiere
- Translator: Raymond Rosenthal
- Language: Italian
- Publisher: Einaudi (Italian); Summit Books (English)
- Publication date: 1985
- Publication place: Italy
- English publication date: 1989
- Media type: Print
- Pages: 252
- ISBN: 8-8065-8024-8
- OCLC: 898794965

Other People's Trades (Italian: L'altrui mestiere) is a collection of fifty-one essays written by Primo Levi between 1969 and 1985. According to Levi, the essays are "the fruit of my roaming about as a curious dilettante for more than a decade". Mainly written for his regular column in La Stampa, the Turin daily newspaper, the essays include book reviews, autobiographical snippets, exercises in homespun philosophy, and accounts of scientific curiosities.

The book was published in Italian by Einaudi in 1985. It was translated into English by Raymond Rosenthal and published by Summit Books in 1989.

== Contents ==
- My House
- Butterflies
- News from the Sky
- Beetles
- A Bottle of Sunshine
- The Moon and Us
- Inventing an Animal
- The Leap of the Flea
- Frogs on the Moon
- Love's Erector Set
- The Invisible World
- A Long Duel
- Grandfather's Store
- Why Does One Write?
- The Skull and the Orchid
- The Best Goods
- The Scribe
- 'The Most Joyful Creature in the World'
- The Mark of the Chemist
- Eclipse of the Prophet
- Stable/Unstable
- The Language of Chemists (I)
- The Language of Chemists (II)
- The Book of Strange Data
- Writing a Novel
- François Rabelais
- The Force of Amber
- The Irritable Chess Players
- Renzo's Fist
- The Fear of Spiders
- Novels Dictated by Crickets
- Domum Servavit
- On Obscure Writing
- The Children's International
- Going Back to School
- Ex-Chemist
- Signs on Stone
- Against Pain
- Thirty Hours on Castoro Sei
- The Hidden Player
- Ritual and Laughter
- The Need and Fear
- To a Young Reader
