= The Black Hole of Auschwitz =

Collection of essays by Primo Levi

- First edition
- Author: Primo Levi edited by Marco Belpoliti
- Original title: L'asimmetria e la vita
- Translator: Sharon Wood
- Language: Italian
- Publisher: Einaudi (Italian); Polity Press (English)
- Publication date: 2002
- Publication place: Italy
- English publication date: 2005
- Media type: Print (Paperback)
- Pages: 187
- ISBN: 0-7456-3241-6
- OCLC: 254931376

The Black Hole of Auschwitz is a collection of essays by the Italian author Primo Levi. Originally published under the Italian title L'asimmetria e la vita (Asymmetry and Life) it has two distinct halves. The first half, The Black Hole of Auschwitz is a collection of essays, often prefaces to other books, which make a plea against Holocaust denial. The second half, Other People's Trades, is a mixture of essays on a wide variety of subjects. All of these works were collected together in the production of the Italian anthology of Levi's works, Opere, in 1997.

== Contents ==
PART I: THE BLACK HOLE OF AUSCHWITZ

Deportees. Anniversary
The Monument at Auschwitz
'Arbeit Macht Frei'
The Time of Swastikas
Preface to the German Edition of If This Is a Man
Preface to the School Edition of The Truce
Resistance in the Camps
Preface to Y. Katzenelson's The Song of the Murdered Jewish People
Note to the Theatre Version of If This Is a Man
Preface to L. Poliakov's Auschwitz
To the Young: Preface to If This Is a Man
A Past We Thought Would Never Return
Preface to J. Presser's The Night of the Girondins
Films and Swastikas
Letter to Latanzio:'Resign'
Women to the Slaughter
So That the SS do not Return
It began with Kristallnacht
Jean Amery, Philosopher and Suicide
But We Were There
Concentration Camp at Italy's Door
No Return to the Holocausts of the Past (Nazi Massacres, Crowds and the TV)
Images of Holocaust
Europe in Hell
Anne Frank, the Voice of History
Seekers of Lies to Deny the Holocaust
To the Visitor
You Tell Me if This is a Fortunate Jew
The Pharaoh with the Swastika
Preface to H. Langbein's People in Auschwitz
Why See These Images Again?
Preface to R. Hoss's Commandant of Auschwitz
The Black Hole of Auschwitz
Preface to La vita offesa
To Our Generation

PART II: OTHER PEOPLE'S TRADES

The Writer Who is Not a Writer
Racial Intolerance
Preface to L. Caglioti's I due voiti della chimica (The Two Faces of Chemistry)
We See No Other Adam in the Neighbourhood
Horseshoe Nails
Let's See How Much has Come True
Our First Ancestors were Not Animals
Collectors of Torments
Brute Force
Note to Franz Kafka's The Trial
Asymmetry and Life
Preface to Jews in Turin
Itinerary of a Jewish Writer
With the Key of Science
Preface to The Jews of Eastern Europe
What was it that Burned Up in Space?
The Plague has No Frontiers
The Community of Venice and its Ancient Cemetery
The Philosopher-Engineer and his Forbidden Dreams
Guest of Captain Nemo
