= Leonardo de Benedetti =

Italian Jew and physician

Leonardo De Benedetti
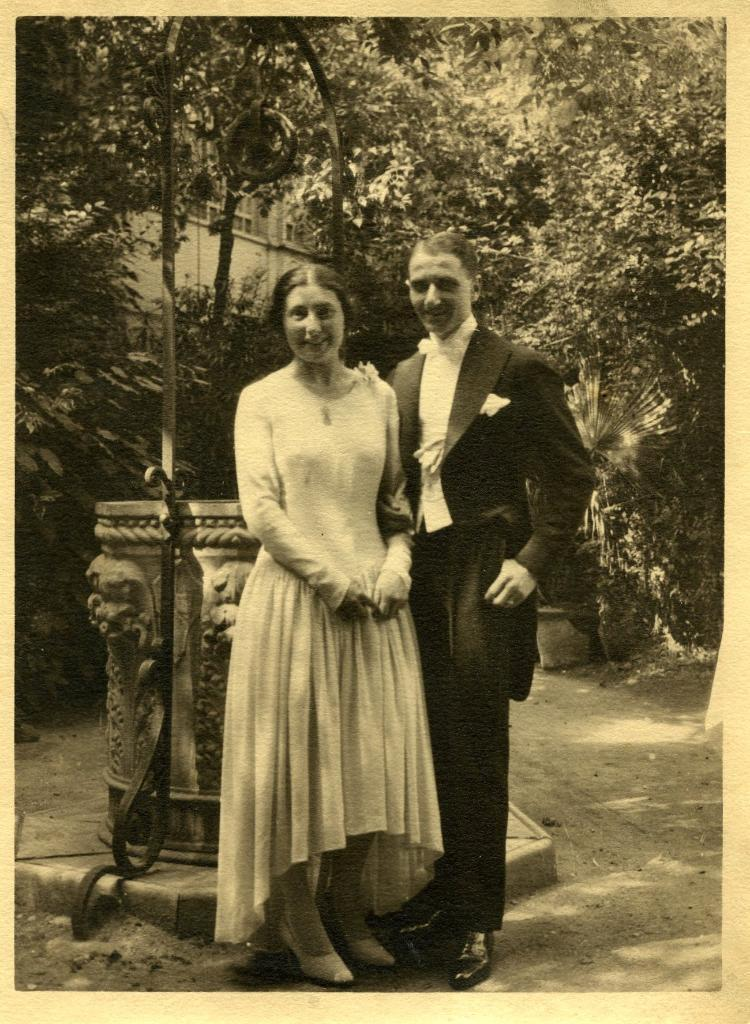
- Leonardo and Jolanda De Benedetti (wedding)
- Born: 15 September 1898; Turin, Italy
- Died: 16 October 1983 (aged 85); Turin, Italy
- Education: University of Turin
- Occupations: Writer, medical doctor
- Spouse(s): Jolanda De Benedetti, born Jolanda De Benedetti
- Writing career
- Language: Italian
- Period: 1947–61
- Genres: Autobiography, essay

Leonardo de Benedetti (15 September 1898 – 16 October 1983) was an Italian Jew and physician who was interned in the Auschwitz concentration camp from February 1944 until its liberation in January 1945. After the end of the Second World War he and fellow inmate Primo Levi wrote Auschwitz Report, a factual report of conditions inside the camp.
