= Six days =

Six days or Six Days or 6 Days may refer to:

== Sports and games ==
- International Six Days Enduro, enduro motorcycling competition with national teams
- 6 Day Race
- Six Days in Fallujah, video game
- Six-day racing, cycling event
  - Six Days of Ghent
  - Six Days of Grenoble

== Film ==
- 6 Days, 2008 documentary film by Vincent Moon associated with the R.E.M. album Accelerate
- 6 Days (2017 film), 2017 action film by Toa Fraser and Glenn Standring about the 1980 Iranian Embassy siege in London
- "Six Days" (Grey's Anatomy), a 2007 episode of Grey's Anatomy
- Six Days (1923 film), a 1923 silent movie starring Corinne Griffith

== Music ==
- "Six Day War" (1971), Colonel Bagshot song
- "Six Days" (song) (2002), DJ Shadow song
- "Six Days on the Road", truck-driving song

== Other ==
- Hexameron, days of creation
- Six Days by Jeremy Bowen
- SMW Six Days, a model of motorcycle

== See also ==
- The Sixth Day (disambiguation)
- Six Day War (disambiguation)
