= Invention: The Care and Feeding of Ideas =

1993 book by Norbert Wiener

- First edition cover
- Author: Norbert Wiener
- Language: English
- Subject: Invention
- Publisher: MIT Press
- Publication date: 1993
- Publication place: United States
- Media type: Print (Paperback)
- Pages: 186
- ISBN: 0-262-73111-8
- Dewey Decimal: 303.48
- LC Class: T15 .W65

Invention: The Care and Feeding of Ideas is a 1993 book by the computer scientist, mathematician and philosopher Norbert Wiener.

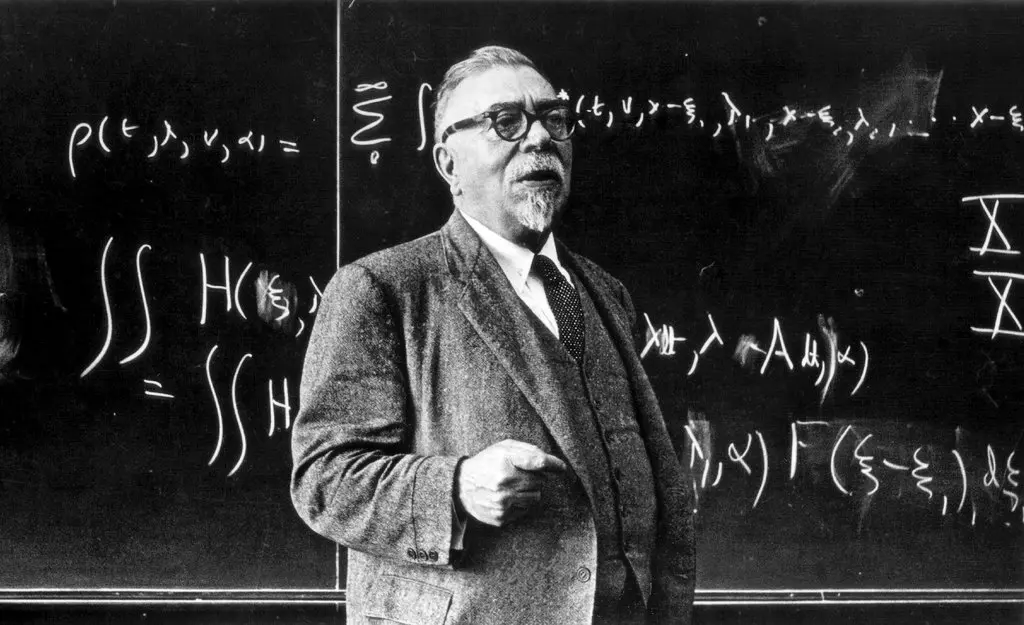
Norbert Wiener in 1964

Invention was written in 1954 but Wiener abandoned the project at the editing stage and returned his advance. MIT Press published it posthumously in 1993, with an introduction by Steve Joshua Heims.

== Reception ==
In 2006, Invention was part of a shortlist of 23 books chosen by the Royal Institution for the title of best science book ever.
