= The Periodic Table (short story collection) =

Book by Primo Levi

- First edition
- Author: Primo Levi
- Original title: Il sistema periodico
- Translator: Raymond Rosenthal
- Cover artist: M. C. Escher
- Language: Italian
- Genre: Short stories
- Publisher: Einaudi (Italian); Schocken Books (English)
- Publication date: 1975
- Publication place: Italy
- English publication date: 1984
- Media type: Print (hardback & paperback)
- Pages: 233
- ISBN: 0-8052-3929-4
- OCLC: 16468959

The elements that are titles of the stories.

The Periodic Table (Italian: Il sistema periodico) is a 1975 short story collection by Primo Levi, named after the periodic table in chemistry. In 2006, the Royal Institution of Great Britain named it the best science book ever.

== Content ==
The stories are autobiographical episodes based on the author's experiences as a Jewish-Italian doctoral-level chemist under the Fascist regime in Italy and afterwards. They include various themes that follow a chronological sequence: his ancestry; his study of chemistry and practising the profession in wartime Italy; a pair of imaginative tales he wrote at that time, and his subsequent experiences as an anti-Fascist partisan; his arrest and imprisonment, interrogation, and internment in the Fossoli di Carpi and Auschwitz camps; and postwar life as an industrial chemist.

Each of the twenty-one stories in the book bears the name of a chemical element as its title and has a connection to the element in some way.

== Chapters ==
1. "Argon" – The author's childhood, the community of Piedmontese Jews and their language. Levi uses the unreactive gas Argon as a metaphor for his ancestors' relative inactivity compared with other European Jewish communities, culminating in the example of an uncle who stayed in bed for over 20 years.
2. "Hydrogen" – Two children experiment with electrolysis. The primordial potential of hydrogen, first and simplest of the elements, is used to juxtapose Levi's idealism with the prosaic expectations of his childhood friend Enrico.
3. "Zinc" – Laboratory experiments in a university. Zinc, which Levi presents as "a boring metal," dissolves readily in acid when impure, but resists dissolution obstinately when pure, which Levi uses to compare the respective strengths of purity and impurity.
4. "Iron" – The author's adolescence, between the racial laws and the Alps, and the inspirational example of a mountain climber turned resistance hero whose rugged strength and preference for actions over words Levi represents with the imagery of iron.
5. "Potassium" – An experience in the laboratory with unexpected results. Levi assumes that potassium will act in similar ways to Sodium, which is directly above it in the periodic table, resulting in a conflagration which teaches Levi to "distrust the Almost-the-Same" and reminds him of hidden differences which, like railroad junctions, can amplify small apparent differences into radically divergent consequences.
6. "Nickel" – Inside the chemical laboratories of a mine. Levi reflects on the magical reputations of mines, as he is hired to attempt to extract Nickel from the waste elements of an asbestos mine. Nickel is named after an imp or sprite, reflecting its deception of miners who were searching for other substances. He succeeds and is elated, but later sadly reflects that the extracted materials would have been used to produce armor plates and artillery shells for the Fascists and Nazis.
7. "Lead" – The narrative of a primitive metallurgist, whose family specialises in obtaining poisonous lead, purchasing wealth at the cost of short lives (fiction)
8. "Mercury" – A tale of populating a remote and desolate island, in which mercury found in a cave is used to procure wives for the island's inhabitants (fiction)
9. "Phosphorus" – An experience on a job in the chemical industry. Levi is asked to investigate whether phosphorus is effective in managing diabetes, a pseudoscientific theory proposed by a senior Nazi chemist. Levi reflects on the impossibility of changing a superior's mind, and relates a melancholy episode in which he helps a woman he is attracted to, but unable to be with due to his Jewish ethnicity, begin a relationship with another man.
10. "Gold" – A story of imprisonment. Having joined the Resistance and been captured, Levi meets a fanatical fascist whose intentions remain pure, though brutal, because of his very ignorance. He encounters a smuggler who prospects gold from a nearby river, and envies him his life of unmolested freedom.
11. "Cerium" – Survival in the Lager. Levi and his friend Alberto survive by stealing rods of iron-cerium and using it to manufacture cigarette lighters, symbolising the flicker of hope in the darkest circumstances. Alberto counsels Levi to be more practical and shrewd, but is taken on a death march and disappears just before they are liberated by Russia.
12. "Chromium" – The recovery of livered varnishes. Levi introduces a new ingredient to the formula for varnishes as a temporary fix, only to discover that his addition remained in the formula unnecessarily for years afterwards due to corporate bureaucracy.
13. "Sulfur" – An experience on a job in the chemical industry (apparently fiction). An operative has a near-miss incident with a sulfur-burning furnace which nearly explodes from excessive pressure.
14. "Titanium" – A scene of daily life (apparently fiction). A man paints a fence with a titanium white paint, and keeps a young girl away from it by drawing a chalk circle around her on the ground.
15. "Arsenic" – Consultation about a sugar sample. Levi finds arsenic in a bag of sugar gifted to a cobbler by a rival, but his customer feels no ill-will toward him.
16. "Nitrogen" – Trying to manufacture cosmetics by scratching the floor of a hen-house. Levi reflects on using the excrement of birds and reptiles to manufacture lipstick, and concludes that the origins of matter are irrelevant to its eventual use.
17. "Tin" – A domestic chemical laboratory. Levi tries unsuccessfully to make a living with his friend Emilio in a self-started laboratory manufacturing stannous chloride, and reflects on the "friendly" properties of the metal tin, which are subverted into the unpleasant properties of its chloride.
18. "Uranium" – Analyzing a piece of metal. Levi encounters a man who claims to have been gifted a chunk of uranium by two strangers he met on a plain, and upon testing it finds out that it is actually cadmium. He envies the man the freedom to invent an exciting and fictional life for himself.
19. "Silver" – The story of some unsuitable photographic plates. At a 25th anniversary of chemistry graduates, Levi muses on the endurance of character traits over time, and on the necessity of taking responsibility for the actions both of one's ancestors and of those working for one's department.
20. "Vanadium" – Finding a German chemist after the war. Levi is thrown into a surreal correspondence with his former supervisor in Auschwitz, who asks for his forgiveness but seems to deny the reality of his crimes. He reflects on the absence of ideal characters for such a confrontation, and his inadequacy to represent the victims of the holocaust, and his supervisors' inadequacy to represent the perpetrators.
21. "Carbon" – The history of a carbon atom. Levi recounts the cyclic life of a single atom of carbon, culminating in its residence in his own brain and participation in enabling him to tell its story.

== Bibliography ==
- First American edition, New York, Schocken Books, 1984
  - ISBN 0-8052-3929-4 (hardcover)
  - ISBN 0-8052-0811-9 (trade paperback)
- Reissues
  - Random House hardcover edition, September 1996 ISBN 0-679-44722-9 (ISBN 978-0-679-44722-1)
  - Knopf Publishing Group paperback edition, April 1995 ISBN 0-8052-1041-5 (ISBN 9780805210415)

== Adaptations ==
The book was dramatised for radio by BBC Radio 4 in 2016. The dramatisation was broadcast in 12 episodes, with Henry Goodman and Akbar Kurtha as Primo Levi.

== See also ==
- Quotations related to The Periodic Table at Wikiquote
