= A Tranquil Star =

2007 anthology by Primo Levi

- First edition cover - published by Penguin Classics.
- Author: Primo Levi
- Original title: Vizio di forma and Storie naturali
- Translator: Ann Goldstein and Alessandra Bastagli
- Publisher: Penguin
- Publication date: 2007
- Publication place: United Kingdom
- Media type: Print (hardcover)
- Pages: 164 pp
- ISBN: 978-0-7139-9955-6
- OCLC: 76798314

A Tranquil Star: Unpublished Stories of Primo Levi is a 2007 anthology of short stories by the Italian writer Primo Levi. Released 20 years after Levi's death, the book consists of seventeen stories previously unpublished in English. The stories were translated by Ann Goldstein, an editor at The New Yorker and Alessandra Bastagli, an editor at Palgrave Macmillan, with one story translated by writer Jenny McPhee.

These stories were previously published in newspapers and the Italian originals were collected, along with other work, in Lilít e Altri Racconti (Lilith and Other Stories) in 1981. The stories in the first section of Lilít e Altri Racconti, which focus on The Holocaust, were published in English as Moments of Reprieve in 1986. A Tranquil Star is sourced from the other two sections, which do not deal with Holocaust. In contrast with Levi's better-known Holocaust work, they are "teasing, satirical, fantastical and occasionally macabre ... reminiscent not so much of the Levi that English readers have come to know as of the playful and sometimes sinister fiction of Borges or Kafka".

Written between 1949 and 1986, the stories include semi-autobiographical works such as "The Death of Marinese", fantasy tales in the manner of Borges or Calvino such as "Buffet Dinner", and science fiction such as the title story.

== Contents ==
- Part I: The Early Stories
  - "The Death of Marinese" (1949) first published in Il Ponte, translated by Alessandra Bastagli. A captured Italian partisan sits in the back of a truck with other prisoners and German guards. Slowly he realises that he is going to be tortured and killed and so he decides to fight back. He works out a plan to take a grenade from one of the guards and explode it, killing himself and some of the guards, but will he succeed?
  - "Bear Meat" (1961), first published in Il Mondo, translated by Alessandra Bastagli. Bear meat is "the taste of being strong and free". A group of mountaineers swap stories about their adventures, all of which involve a mistake – a central part of being free and living life to the full.
  - "Censorship in Bitinia" (1961), published in Storie naturali, translated by Jenny McPhee. Censors are suffering from strange and incurable diseases due to their work. A solution has to be found. Animals are trained to do the work. Chickens seem to be the best censors.
  - "Knall" (1970) published in Vizio di forma, translated by Ann Goldstein. A device made from metal, about the same size as a cigar. It is lethal, but only from a range of less than a meter. They can only be used once and everyone carries them. Strangers now keep their distance from one another, everyone is fearful. But as no blood is spilt in their use they are not used to kill very often.
  - "In the Park" (1970), published in Vizio di forma, translated by Ann Goldstein. The Park is where characters from novels live. There are many detectives, soldiers and prostitutes, but few plumbers. Here they eat, drink and chat and pass the time of day.
- Part II: Later Stories
  - "The Magic Paint", published in Lilith, translated by Ann Goldstein. Paint it with magic paint and it thrives, is protected, even lucky. Di Prima is painted in it from head to toe. His girlfriend makes up with him, traffic lights turn to green on his approach, he even wins a small lottery prize. The chemist isolates the active ingredient, Tantalum! They experiment by using the paint to counteract Fassio's evil eye with terrible consequences.
  - "Gladiators", published in Lilith, translated by Ann Goldstein. Fighters with hammers take on drivers in medium-sized cars. The fight is exciting but distasteful.
  - "The Fugitive", published in Lilith, translated by Ann Goldstein. Pasquale writes a poem, but he keeps losing it. But it has grown tiny feet and moves on its own. He cannot copy it, he glues it down, the paper disintegrates, the poem is lost. Can Pasquale rewrite it?
  - "One Night", first published in La Stampa, translated by Alessandra Bastagli. A train is overwhelmed by a mass of leaves and grinds to a halt one evening. Overnight a tribe of dwarves dismantles the train and the tracks. By morning nothing is left.
  - "Fra Diavolo on the Po", first published in La Stampa, translated by Alessandra Bastagli. A memoir of Levi's week-ends drilling with his rifle in the MVSN.
  - "The Sorcerers", published in Lilith, translated by Ann Goldstein. Two modern men are in the jungle studying the Sirioni Indians. A fire wrecks their camp and they lose all their technology. Now they have no tricks the Indians see them as helpless burdens. Their culture leads them to kill the burdensome.
  - "Bureau of Vital Statistics", first published in La Stampa, translated by Alessandra Bastagli. In an office a clerk receives cards every day on his desk stating the future date of death of individual citizens. His job is to assign a cause of death. A man is to die of liver failure, a woman in a car crash. But then he has to give a cause of death for a young child. He cannot. He requests a transfer.
  - "The Girl in the Book", published in Lilith, translated by Ann Goldstein. Umberto reads about a fascinating woman in the memoir of an English soldier. He recognises the name and remembers seeing it on the wall of a house by the sea. He introduces himself to the woman. Is she the woman in the book? Is the story true?
  - "Buffet Dinner", first published in La Stampa, translated by Alessandra Bastagli. A kangaroo goes to a party.
  - "The TV Fans from Delta Cep", first published in L'Astronomia, translated by Alessandra Bastagli. Aliens watch TV broadcasts from Earth. Their favourite transmission is a commercial for tomato puree.
  - "The Molecule's Defiance", published in Lilith, translated by Ann Goldstein. A batch of paint goes horribly wrong. A retelling of a true story from Levi's time at the paint factory.
  - "A Tranquil Star", published in Lilith, translated by Ann Goldstein. A star explodes. It is a tiny speck on a photographic plate at an observatory, but for those involved its magnitude cannot be described by language.
