= Best science book ever =

Honorary title

On 19 October 2006, the Royal Institution of Great Britain named the 1975 short story collection The Periodic Table, by Primo Levi, the best science book ever. After taking nominations from many scientists in various disciplines, authors, and other notable people (such as the Archbishop of Canterbury), the Royal Institution compiled a shortlist of books for consideration. This shortlist was presented to the public at an event held at Imperial College and the audience voted to determine which book was "the best."

== List of books ==
=== Shortlist ===
- The Periodic Table (1975) by Primo Levi (winner)
- King Solomon's Ring (1949) by Konrad Lorenz
- Arcadia (1993) by Tom Stoppard
- The Selfish Gene (1976) by Richard Dawkins

=== Other nominees ===
- The Double Helix by James Watson
- The Life of Galileo by Bertolt Brecht
- Pluto's Republic by Peter Medawar
- The Voyage of the Beagle by Charles Darwin
- The Blank Slate by Steven Pinker
- A Leg to Stand On by Oliver Sacks
- Consciousness Explained by Daniel Dennett
- Shadows of the Mind by Roger Penrose
- On Growth and Form by D'Arcy Wentworth Thompson
- Invention by Norbert Wiener
- Gödel, Escher, Bach by Douglas Hofstadter
- Mathematics, Form and Function by Saunders Mac Lane
- A Mathematician's Apology by G.H. Hardy
- The Man Who Mistook His Wife for a Hat by Oliver Sacks
- How to Build a Time Machine by Paul Davies
- Mason & Dixon by Thomas Pynchon
- Surely You're Joking, Mr. Feynman! by Richard Feynman
- The Strategy of Conflict by Thomas Schelling
- The Microbe Hunters by Paul de Kruif
