= Collected Poems (Levi) =

Collection of poems by Primo Levi

- First English edition
- Author: Primo Levi
- Original title: Ad ora incerta
- Translator: Ruth Feldman and Brian Swann
- Publisher: Garzanti (Italian); Faber & Faber (English)
- Publication date: 1984
- Publication place: United Kingdom
- English publication date: 1988
- Media type: Print
- Pages: 92
- ISBN: 0-571-15255-4
- OCLC: 26362068

Collected Poems is the English language collection of poems by Italian author Primo Levi. Its Italian title is Ad ora incerta.

== Contents ==
From Shema

Crescenzago, Buna, Singing, 25 February 1944, The Crow's Song, Shema, Reveille, Monday, Another Monday, After R. M. Rilke, Ostjuden, Sunset at Fossoli, 11 February 1946, The Glacier, The Witch, Avigliana, Waiting, Epitaph, The Crow's Song II, There Were a Hundred, For Adolf Eichmann, Landing, Lilith, In the Beginning, Via Cigna, The Black Stars, Leavetaking.

From At an Uncertain Hour

Pliny, The Girl-Child of Pompei, Huayna Capac, The Gulls of Settimo, Annunciation, Toward the Valley, Wooden Heart, The First Atlas, 12 July 1980, Dark Band, Autobiography, Voices, Unfinished Business, Partisan, Arachne, 2000, Passover, Laid Up, Old Mole, A Bridge, The Work, A Mouse, Nachtwache, Agave, Pearl Oyster, The Snail, A Profession, Flight, The Survivor, The Elephant, Sidereus Nuncius, Give Us, Chess, Chess II, Memorandum Book.

Previously Uncollected Poems

'Gedale's Song', Decathlon Man, Dust, A Valley, Unresolved Burdens, Song of Those Who Died in vain, The Thaw, Samson, Delilah, Airport, On Trial, Thieves, To My Friends, Proxy, August, The Fly, The Dromedary, Almanac.
