= The Sixth Day and Other Tales =

1990 collection of short stories by Primo Levi

- Hardback cover - published by Summit Books.
- Author: Primo Levi
- Original title: Vizio di forma and Storie naturali
- Translator: Raymond Rosenthal
- Language: Italian
- Publisher: Summit
- Publication date: 1990
- Publication place: Italy
- Media type: Print (hardcover)
- Pages: 222
- ISBN: 0-671-62617-5
- OCLC: 21372291
- Dewey Decimal: 853/.914 20
- LC Class: PQ4872.E8 A6 1990

The Sixth Day and Other Tales, written by Primo Levi, is a collection of short stories, originally published in Storie naturali and Vizio di forma. It was published in English in 1990 by Summit Books, translated by Raymond Rosenthal. Unlike the author's earlier and better-known works, these stories may be considered science fiction.

== Contents ==
- "The Mnemogogues": a doctor collects the scents of past places and events.
- "Angelic Butterfly": are humans trapped in the pupal stage? If so what happens when they pupate?
- "Order on the Cheap": NATCA’s Mr Simpson shows off the Mimer. Like the replicator from Star Trek, anything can be reproduced.
- "Man’s Friend": tapeworms communicate through patterns on their bodies. They are aware they live inside us.
- "Some Applications of the Mimer": Gilberto duplicates his wife. But the two Emmas slowly develop as different women.
- "Versamina": a drug turns pain into pleasure. The consequence is that people will hurt themselves.
- "The Sleeping Beauty in the Fridge: A Winter’s Tale": Peter defrosts Patricia regularly. Sometimes for special events, sometimes for her regular checkups. But also sometimes for his own reasons. Patricia has been in the deep freeze for over a hundred years, but can stand it no more. She recruits Baldur to help her escape.
- "The Measure of Beauty": a NATCA device for the objective measurement of beauty. But does it work? Of course it can be made to show the owner is beautiful.
- "Full Employment": Simpson learns to communicate with the bees who help him to communicate with other insects. He enters into deals with them. Dragonflies pick berries for him, ants clean his garden, they can also manufacture small electronic components and help with microsurgery. But someone arranges for the eels to smuggle drugs.
- "The Sixth Day": The committee agonises over how to design the human. But after all their argument management imposes an arbitrary design.
- "Retirement Fund": NATCA develop something resembling a virtual reality set, but it replays the experiences that someone else recorded. Their elation and excitement are in the playback. It is, of course, addictive.
- "Westward": Why do lemmings march to the sea? Researchers find out it is not hunger as is widely thought, but chemical. A form of alcohol is found that will suppress the desire for suicide.
- "Seen from Afar": Aliens watch our planet, they cannot see the detail, but try to guess what things are and why the things they observe occur. Why are there streams of white and red lights in some places when darkness falls. They assume that ships are creatures travelling in straight lines.
- "The Hard-Sellers": people came to a man to convince him to be born. They show him all the advantages of being alive, but he is sceptical. They say he is needed in the world of the living.
- "Small Red Lights": everything in his life is governed by red lights, thousands of them.
- "For a Good Purpose": the telephone network develops intelligence when it is connected to the French and German networks. Slowly it experiments with its powers.
- "Psychophant": a device creates an object that symbolises the person who touches it.
- "Recuenco: The Nurse": the starving have their mythology about the creature in the sky that comes to feed them.
- "Recuenco: The Rafter": the team on board the aircraft that delivers the food to the starving have their mythology about the recipients.
- "His Own Blacksmith: To Italo Calvino": a man can remember everything, even the memories of his ancestors, all the way back to when they first developed self-awareness. He sees that our development ceased once we had learned to use tools.
- "The Servant": the story of a golem.
- "Mutiny: To Mario Rigoni Stern": it features a garden that has a mind of its own.
- "Excellent Is the Water": a story dealing with what happens when the water’s viscosity begins to creep up. All life is affected.
