= The Mirror Maker =

- First English edition
- Author: Primo Levi
- Original title: Il fabbricante di specchi. Racconti e saggi.
- Translator: Raymond Rosenthal
- Language: Italian
- Publisher: Schocken Books (English)
- Publication date: 1986
- Publication place: Italy
- English publication date: 1989
- Media type: Print (paperback)
- Pages: 176
- ISBN: 0-8052-4076-4
- OCLC: 60155121

The Mirror Maker is a collection of stories and essays by Italian author Primo Levi originally published in the Italian newspaper La Stampa.

== Stories ==
"The Thaw"
"The Interview"
"They Were Made to Be Together"
"The Great Mutation"
"The Two Flags"
"Five Intimate Interviews"
"The Mirror Maker"
"Through the Walls"
"The Ant's Wedding"
"Force Majeure"
"A Mystery in the Lager"
"Time Checkmated"
"The Tommy-Gun under the Bed"

== Essays ==
"A Valley"
"The Commander of Auschwitz"
"The Moon and Man"
"Sic!"
"Our Dreams"
"The Struggle for Life"
"Spears Become Shields"
"Translating Kafka"
"Rhyming on the Counterattack"
"Dear Horace"
"Bacteria Roulette"
"Among the Peaks of Manhattan"
"The Wine of the Borgias"
"Reproducing Miracles"
"The Man Who Flies"
"About Gossip"
"Jack London's Buck"
"Adam's Clay"
"The Spider's Secret"
"The Dispute among German Historians"
"Defiance in the Ghetto"
"Hatching the Cobra"
