= Pietro Redondi =

Italian historian of science (born 1950)

Pietro Redondi (born 1950) is an Italian historian of science, known for his work on Galileo Galilei.

Redondi obtained his doctorate in 1978 at the School for Advanced Studies in the Social Sciences in Paris, in the History of Science. In 1981-1992 he did research for the CNRS at the Centre Alexandre Koyré in Paris, and from 1985 to 1990 as deputy director. In 1983 he was at the Institute for Advanced Studies. From 1983 he was Assistant Professor (Professore Associato), then Full Professor of History of Science at the University of Bologna. Redondi is a professor at the Faculty of Psychology of the University of Milano-Bicocca.

In 2012 he was visiting professor of art history at the Conservatoire National des Arts et Métiers in Paris.

Redondi has four children: a boy and three girls (two are twins).

== Book on Galileo ==
In his 1983 book, Redondi developed a new approach to the trial of Galileo. According to this approach, the main reason for his conviction as "vehemently suspected of heresy" was not his advocacy of the Copernican worldview, but his earlier conflict with the Jesuits in his book Il Saggiatore of 1623, in which he advocated an atomist theory of Democritus that ran counter to Aristotelian doctrines endorsed by Rome as well as the Catholic doctrine of the Eucharist. A report to the Inquisition (sent anonymously in 1624, and first discovered by Redondi in the archives of the Inquisition) did not succeed at the time. The Jesuits saw a new opportunity in 1632 to start a trial of Galileo. Until then the pope and the Curia had patronized Galilei, but withdrew their support in 1632.

Redondi also dealt with the reception of Galileo and the idealization of Galileo in the 19th century. He also dealt with the Galilean researcher Alexandre Koyré.

From 1983 until 1993 he was founding editor of History and Technology. In 1985 he was awarded the Bronze Medal of the CNRS.
