= Auschwitz Report (book) =

Book by Primo Levi

- Author: Primo Levi and Leonardo de Benedetti
- Original title: Report on the Sanitary and Medical Organization of the Monowitz Concentration Camp for Jews (Auschwitz - Upper Silesia)
- Translator: Judith Woolf
- Publisher: Verso
- Publication date: 2006
- Publication place: United Kingdom
- Media type: Print (Hardcover)
- Pages: 97
- ISBN: 1-84467-092-9
- OCLC: 70131114
- Dewey Decimal: 940.53/1853858 22
- LC Class: D805.5.A96 L4713 2006

Auschwitz Report (2006) is a non-fiction report on the Auschwitz extermination camp by Primo Levi and Leonardo de Benedetti.

When Levi and de Benedetti were in a Soviet holding camp in Katowice in 1945 the Soviet authorities asked them to document the living conditions in Auschwitz. De Benedetti had been on Levi's transport from Fossoli, near Modena, Italy. Both had been left behind when the camp was evacuated and so their time at Auschwitz coincided exactly. De Benedetti was a medical doctor, though he acted as one only in the final weeks of his time at the camp. His survival was extremely unusual, since he was in his 40s when he arrived: normally, those over the age of 30 were murdered in the gas chambers upon arrival.

Much of the report describes the facilities for treating the sick. Treatments were rudimentary, medicines were in short supply and the skill of the nurses was minimal. Normal practices of hygiene were ignored. Cross-contamination and infection were widespread. The hospital was set up only a few months before Levi's arrival. There had previously been no medical treatment at all. Sick inmates worked until they collapsed, at which point they were beaten: if they moved, they were sent back to work, and if not, they were murdered in the gas chambers.

The book ends with two obituary notices written by Levi about de Benedetti.
