= The Sixth Day =

The Sixth Day may refer to:

- The Sixth Day (film), a 1986 film directed by Youssef Chahine
- The Sixth Day and Other Tales, a 1990 collection of stories by Primo Levi, with a story titled "The Sixth Day"
- The 6th Day, a 2000 film featuring Arnold Schwarzenegger
- The Sixth Day: Single Collection, 2004 compilation album by Gackt
- The Sixth Day, a 2024 song by Rotting Christ
