= If This Is a Man =

1947 memoir by Primo Levi

- Original first edition cover
- Author: Primo Levi
- Original title: Se questo è un uomo
- Translator: Stuart Woolf
- Language: Italian
- Genre: Memoir
- Publisher: De Silva (Italian); Einaudi (Italian); The Orion Press (English)
- Publication date: 11 Oct 1947
- Publication place: Italy
- English publication date: 1959
- Pages: 179 pp

If This Is a Man (Italian: Se questo è un uomo [se kˈkwesto ˌɛ un ˈwɔːmo]; United States title: Survival in Auschwitz) is a memoir by Jewish-Italian writer Primo Levi, first published in 1947. It describes his arrest as a member of the Italian anti-fascist resistance during the Second World War, and his incarceration in the Auschwitz concentration camp (Monowitz) from February 1944 until the camp was liberated on 27 January 1945.

== Background ==
Primo Levi was born in 1919 in Turin. His forebears were Piedmontese Jews.

He studied chemistry at the University of Turin, graduating summa cum laude in 1942, notwithstanding the restrictions imposed by Mussolini's racial laws. In 1942 he found a position with a Swiss drug company in Milan. With the German occupation of northern and central Italy in 1943, Levi joined a partisan group in Aosta Valley in the Alps.

He was arrested in December 1943 and transported to Auschwitz in February 1944. He remained there until the camp was liberated on 27 January 1945. If This Is a Man recounts his experiences in the camp.

== Chapters ==
1. In the first chapter, "The Journey", Levi describes his experience as a partisan and his capture by fascist militia in December 1943. He is transferred to a detention camp near Modena. After several weeks, the six hundred and fifty Italian Jews in the camp are told that they will be leaving, their destination Auschwitz (a name which means nothing to them). They are crammed into freight cars without water; the train travels slowly through Austria, Czechoslovakia and into Poland. On arrival, those capable of work are separated from those who are not.
2. In "On the Bottom", Levi describes how he and his companions are stripped, shorn and showered. They are given ragged clothes which they are forced to carry as they run, naked, to another barrack. Looking at each other, they realise that they have reached the bottom: no human condition more wretched exists. A number is tattooed on each man's arm. At the end of the day they are assembled in the square, where they watch their new comrades march back from work. Levi describes the laws, rites and taboos of the camp.
3. In "Initiation" Levi tells how, late one evening, he is assigned a shared bunk. The next morning he joins the frantic communal run to the washroom. He concludes that the act of washing in filthy water without soap can serve no purpose. Steinlauf, a fellow prisoner, contradicts him by arguing that to survive—in order to bear witness—one must force oneself to save at least the outward form of civilisation.
4. In the fourth chapter Levi's foot is injured while he is working and, after a cursory and humiliating examination, he is admitted to "Ka-Be", the Krankenbau or infirmary. Those unlikely to recover are selected to leave, including one of Levi's neighbours. Levi speculates that the man might be transferred to another camp; another neighbour observes that Levi 'does not want to understand'. It is a life of limbo. The physical discomforts are few, but with this comes a reawakening of memory and conscience and the realisation that no one is to be permitted to survive and report what man's audacity made of man in Auschwitz.
5. After twenty days Levi is discharged from the infirmary. Luckily he is assigned to a barrack where his best friend Alberto lives, a man of great intelligence and intuition. In "Our Nights" Levi describes his recurring dream of being at home with loved ones, who do not listen as he recounts his experience of the camp. Alberto tells him it is a common dream. Levi describes the nightly procession to the bucket which serves as the latrine, the shapeless nightmares of violence and the shattering moment of reveille at the start of the new day.
6. In "The Work" Levi is assigned a new bunkmate, Resnyk, who is notable for his kindness and consideration. Levi describes the working day. Resnyk agrees to pair himself with Levi and shoulders the greater part of the painful, backbreaking work. There is a brief respite in the middle of the day when the prisoners eat a bowl of watery soup in silence before falling into a brief sleep in the warmth of the shed. Ordered back to work, Resnyk says he would not chase his dog into this biting wind.
7. In "A Good Day" the first day of sunshine gives the prisoners hope of spring. But as soon as they forget about the cold, they remember how hungry they are. They torment each other by describing long-ago meals. The discovery by the barrack's resident fixer of a 50-litre vat of soup temporarily removes that source of unhappiness. With their hunger assuaged, they can think of their mothers and wives, which they rarely allow themselves to do. For a few hours they are unhappy in the manner of free men.
8. In "This Side of Good and Evil", Levi explains the camp's system of commerce. Since almost nothing is supplied by the Germans, not even a spoon to eat meals, anything (strips of one's shirt, one's gold teeth, etc.) can be bartered or stolen. Levi asks the reader to contemplate the meaning of the moralistic words "right" and "wrong", and "good" and "evil", on his side of the barbed wire in a world of desperate, half-starved prisoners.
9. Levi likens the camp to a gigantic social experiment in "the conduct of the human animal in the struggle for life." He says that when people are pushed to the extreme, two categories emerge: "The Drowned and the Saved". Among the latter category, Levi expresses extra contempt for the camp's "Jewish prominents" who have plotted to gain a position of privilege, and curried favor with the Germans, by tyrannically ruling over the other Jewish prisoners.
10. In "Chemistry Examination", Levi narrates the surreal experience of being marched to the camp's magnesium chloride warehouse with a chance to perhaps save himself by becoming a "Specialist". So weakened with hunger he can barely stand, he takes an oral chemistry examination, in German, from Doktor Pannwitz who coldly looks at the filthy, emaciated Levi like a specimen from a lower species. After the exam, Levi returns to his barracks with no inkling of what the future holds.
11. In "The Canto of Ulysses" Levi is sent to fetch the daily soup with Jean, a young Alsatian prisoner. As they walk, Levi attempts to recall a passage from Dante’s Inferno, Ulysses’ final speech. The lines evoke a powerful sense of dignity and human striving, momentarily lifting Levi from the dehumanising reality of the camp. Jean listens attentively, and Levi senses a shared understanding. The passage becomes a rare moment of intellectual and emotional clarity, a fleeting rediscovery of culture and self-worth amid brutality. Levi forgets four triplets—but not the feeling. For a moment, he is a man again.
12. By August 1944, Levi and his fellow prisoners are considered 'old hands'. In "The Events of the Summer", Levi describes how the camp is shaken by Allied bombings, disrupting the construction of the Buna factory and deepening the chaos. Hopes sparked by news of Normandy and the Russian advance quickly fade. The prisoners, exhausted and starving, work amid ruins, dust, and fear. Levi meets Lorenzo, an Italian civilian who quietly brings him bread and kindness for six months. In a world collapsing around them, Lorenzo’s daily gesture affirms Levi’s humanity. Amid destruction and despair, Levi begins to believe he has survived because someone once did good without reward.
13. In "October 1944" the prisoners anticipate a 'selection': the Germans will send a proportion of the prisoners to the gas chambers to make room for new arrivals. No one knows the exact day on which it will take place; the prisoners reassure each other that surely it will not be they who will be selected. When it comes, the process is so perfunctory that it is almost a matter of chance who is chosen.
14. In "Kraus" Levi recalls the Hungarian working alongside him who has not grasped that in the camp hard work is not rewarded; not wasting energy is more likely to lead to survival.
15. Winter has arrived. "Die Drei Leute vom Labor" ("The Three Laboratory People") describes how Levi and two other prisoners are chosen to work in the laboratory. Its cleanliness and warmth contrasts with the rest of the bomb-ravaged and snow-covered camp. The presence of three healthy women makes the prisoners self-conscious about their own physical deterioration.
16. In "The Last One" Levi describes the audacious schemes he and Alberto devise to acquire goods to exchange for bread. At the end of the day the prisoners are assembled to witness the hanging of a man who has taken part in an uprising. At the moment of death he cries out "Comrades, I am the last!" The prisoners look on passively, robbed by now of any autonomy.
17. Written in the form of a diary "The Story of Ten Days" is the work's epilogue. Suffering with scarlet fever, Levi is admitted to the camp hospital. By now the arrival of the Red Army is imminent and the Germans decide to abandon the camp. Only the healthy prisoners are evacuated. Alberto leaves, Levi remains. The forced march of the departing prisoners will take almost all of them, including Alberto, to their deaths. Levi and two other prisoners set about helping the other patients in their barrack, scouring the abandoned camp for provisions. The Soviet troops arrive on 27 January 1945.

== Composition ==
Levi began to write in February 1946, with a draft of what would become the final chapter recording his most recent memories of Auschwitz. According to Ian Thomson, Levi worked over the next ten months with concentrated energy and extreme facility. Levi told him that the words poured out of him "like a flood which has been dammed and suddenly rushes forth". In the daytime Levi was working at a paint factory north-east of Turin. Mostly he wrote in the evenings and late into the night, although Levi said that the chapter "The Canto of Ulysses" was written almost entirely in a single, half-hour lunch break. The first manuscript was completed in December 1946 and required considerable editorial work. His future wife, Lucia Morpurgo, helped him to shape the book, giving it a clear sense of direction.

== Publication ==
Primo Levi

In January 1947, the manuscript was initially rejected by Einaudi, with the writers Cesare Pavese and Natalia Ginzburg thinking it too early after the war for such an account. However Levi managed to find a smaller publisher, De Silva, who published the book on 11 October 1947. They printed 2,500 copies of the book, 1,500 of which were sold, mostly in Levi's hometown of Turin. Prior to this, however, five excerpts had been serialised, under its then title Sul fondo (in the Abyss) in a Turin Communist newspaper The People's Friend, between 29 March and 31 May 1947. In 1955, Levi signed a contract with Einaudi for a new edition, which was published in 1958. The initial printing of 2000 copies was followed by a second of the same size.

An English translation by Stuart Woolf was published in 1959. A German translation by Heinz Reidt appeared in 1961 (titled Ist das ein Mensch?) and a French edition in the same year.

All translations were completed under Levi's close supervision. He was particularly careful to oversee the German translation, writing in The Drowned and the Saved: "I did not trust my German publisher. I wrote him an almost insolent letter: I warned him not to remove or change a single word in the text, and I insisted that he send me the manuscript of the translation in batches ... I wanted to check on not merely its lexical but also its inner faithfulness." Robert S. C. Gordon writes that Levi went on to develop a close relationship with Reidt. The German edition contains a special preface addressed to the German people, which Levi said he wrote out of passionate necessity to remind them what they had done.

If This Is a Man is often published alongside Levi's second work of witness, The Truce (Italian title: La Tregua). The English translation of that book was published in 1965, again by Stuart Woolf, and was awarded the John Florio Prize for Italian translation in 1966.

== Invocation ==
The book is introduced by a poem. The construction "If ..." invites the reader to make a judgment. It alludes to the treatment of people as Untermenschen (German for "sub-humans"), and to Levi's examination of the degree to which it was possible for a prisoner in Auschwitz to retain his or her humanity. The poem explains the title and sets the theme of the book: humanity in the midst of inhumanity.

The last part of the poem, beginning meditate, explains Levi's purpose in having written it: to record what happened so that later generations will "ponder" (a more literal translation of meditare) the significance of the events he lived through. It also parallels the language of the V'ahavta, the Jewish prayer that commands followers to remember and pass on the teachings of their faith.

== Style ==
The calm sobriety of Levi's prose style is all the more striking given the horrific nature of the events he describes. Levi explained in his 1976 Appendix to the work: "I thought that my word would be more credible and useful the more objective it appeared and the less impassioned it sounded; only in that way does the witness in court fulfil his function, which is to prepare the ground for the judge. It is you who are the judges."

He ascribed the clarity of his language to the habits acquired during his training as a chemist: "My model was that of the weekly reports, a normal practice in factories: they must be concise, precise and written in a language accessible to all levels of the firm's hierarchy."

== Adaptations ==
In 1965 the Canadian Broadcasting Corporation aired the 140-minute dramatic feature, "If This is a Man", George Whalley's adaptation of Stuart Woolf's translation. The broadcast was produced by John Reeves, who has written about the radio production.

In 2004 the National Theatre in London presented a stage version of the book under the title Primo. It was adapted and performed by Anthony Sher and directed by Richard Wilson. In 2005 the production was filmed for broadcast by the BBC and HBO.

== See also ==
- Le Monde's 100 Books of the Century
- Night (memoir)
- The Diary of a Young Girl
- The Holocaust in the arts and popular culture

== Sources ==
- Benchouiha, Lucie (2006). Primo Levi: Rewriting the Holocaust. Troubador Publishing Ltd. ISBN 1-905237-23-5
- Gordon, Robert S. C. (2007). The Cambridge Companion to Primo Levi. Cambridge University Press. ISBN 0-521-84357-X
- Levi, Primo (2015). The Complete Works of Primo Levi. Penguin Classics. ISBN 978-0-713-99956-3
- Thomson, Ian (2003). Primo Levi: A Biography. Vintage. ISBN 0-09-951521-0
