= The Truce =

Autobiographical book by Primo Levi

- Cover of the first edition. The drawing is by Marc Chagall.
- Author: Primo Levi
- Original title: La tregua
- Translator: Stuart Woolf
- Language: Italian
- Publisher: Einaudi (Italian); The Bodley Head (English)
- Publication date: 1963
- Publication place: Italy
- English publication date: 1965
- Media type: Print (Hardcover) and (Paperback)
- Pages: 253 (1st edition Italian); 222 (1st edition English)
- ISBN: 0-349-10013-6
- OCLC: 17221240

The Truce (Italian: La tregua), titled The Reawakening in the US, is a 1963 book by the Italian author Primo Levi. It is the sequel to If This Is a Man and describes the author's experiences from the liberation of Auschwitz (Monowitz), which was a concentration camp, until he reaches home in Turin, Italy, after a long journey. He describes the situation in different displaced persons camps after the Second World War.

== Summary ==
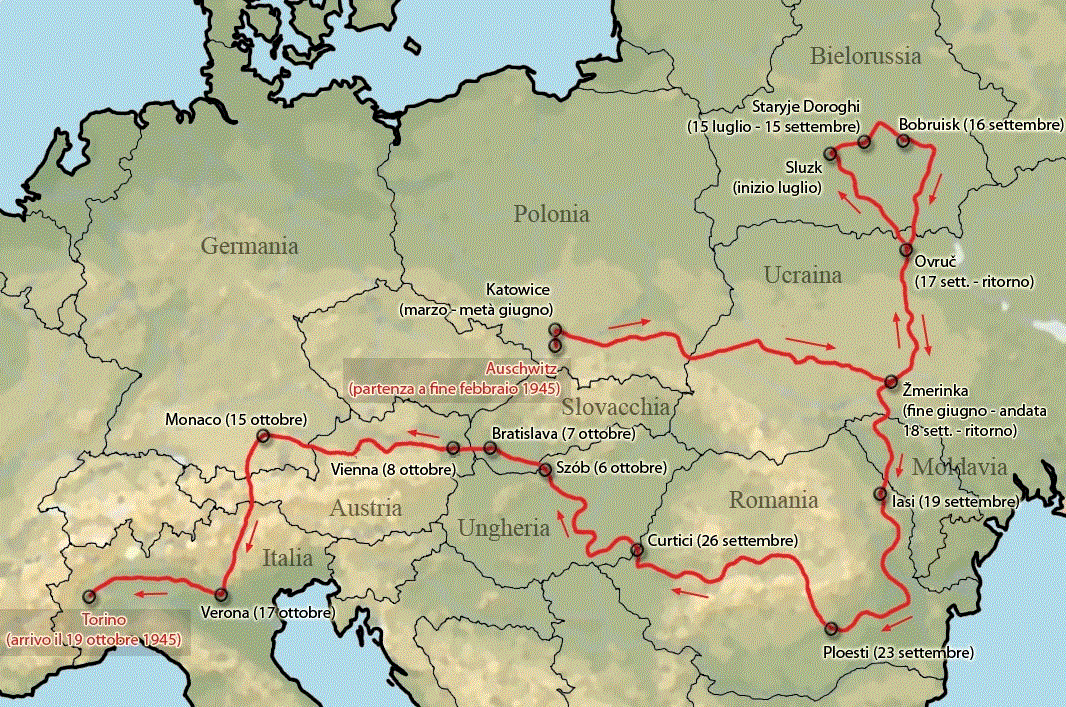
The route taken by Primo Levi in 1945, mostly by train, from Auschwitz to Turin. Note: the national borders are the current ones.

The historian Fritz Stern, in a brief review on Foreign Affairs, wrote that The Reawakening "charts Levi's incredibly circular return to Italy via Eastern Europe and the Soviet Union. Here people and landscapes come vividly alive in a bizarre, often comical series of events and human encounters; a truly remarkable tale."

Levi himself reminisces a bit about a character in the book in his The Paris Review interview: "Have you read my book The Reawakening? You remember Mordo Nahum? I had mixed feelings toward him. I admired him as a man fit for every situation. But of course he was very cruel to me. He despised me because I was not able to manage. I had no shoes. He told me, 'Remember, when there is war, the first thing is shoes, and second is eating. Because if you have shoes, then you can run and steal. But you must have shoes.' 'Yes', I told him, 'well you are right, but there is not war any more'. And he told me, 'Guerra es siempre'. There is always war."

== Plot ==
The book starts with the departure of the Germans from the camp. The sick Häftlinge were left on their own after the healthy ones were taken on a death march away from the approaching Red Army. As all the services have left the camp, exploration journeys begin in search for food and essential items.

When they arrive the Red Army is shocked by the state of the people in the camp and they provide basic medical aid. All remaining inmates are taken to a hospital in the main camp.

After the protagonist has regained some strength, he starts a long journey, first to Kraków, then to Katowice where he stays for some time and works as a pharmaceutic assistant.

The journey continues after weeks eastwards to Tarnów, Rzeszów, Przemyśl and into Ukraine: Lviv, Ternopil, Proskurov, Zhmerynka. The plan was to go south to Odesa but instead he had to take the train northwards and arrives at Slutsk (Belarus). From there he walks and rides in a horse cart to Starye Dorogi where he lives inside Krasny Dom ("Red House") and works as a medical assistant.

Then, after weeks, a Russian Marshal, Semyon Timoshenko, came to the displaced persons camp and declared that they can make their way back home now. By train the journey continues southwards and then westwards: Hungary, Slovakia, Austria and Germany. After 35 days of travel since leaving Krasny Dom he arrives in his home town Turin, which he had last seen 20 months before.

== Adaptations ==
The book was adapted by Tonino Guerra for a film directed by Francesco Rosi, also titled The Truce (1997).
