= History of the Jews in Turin =

The history of the Jews in Turin, Italy, can be first traced to the 4th century when bishop Maximus of Turin recorded the presence of Jews in the city. The city of Turin is in north-west Italy and is the capital of the Piedmont region.

== Medieval History ==
After bishop Maximus of Turin's reference to a Jewish population in the city in the 4th century, there is no evidence of Jews there until 1424. The main Jewish settlements in Piedmont began in the 15th century and consisted of Jews who escaped persecution in Eastern France. These Jews escaped a few decades after the Spanish persecutions, when in 1492 the Catholic King and Queen of Spain Ferdinand and Isabella forced all Jewish and (Muslim) Arab subjects to convert, flee or die on the stake.

The Dukes of Savoy tolerated the Jewish presence in their lands as a means to increase commerce and to extract high taxes. Jews were considered foreigners and as such could not avoid such payments, as they faced the threat of a sudden warrant for their expulsion.

Through the 16th, 17th, and 18th centuries, the most important Jewish communities (then called universities) were formed, on the basis of statutory laws passed mainly by Amedeo the 8th, Emanuele Filiberto and Vittorio Amedeo the 2nd. These universities were located in Turin, Asti, Alessandria, Carmagnola, Casale Monferrato, Cuneo, Fossano, Moncalvo, Saluzzo and Savigliano . At the end of the 18th century, each one of these communities had a Jewish population of more than 100 people with an overall total of 4192. The large Jewish community of Turin consisted of 1,317 people and the small community of Trino Vercellese consisted of 35 people.

The main deprivations made by the Dukes and the Kings of Savoy against Jews included the prohibition against owning real estate, against joining the standing Army, against belonging to Arts and Trades corporations, and against entering schools. Also, and humiliatingly, Jews were forced to wear a distinctive yellow mark.

Despite the numerous prohibitions which aimed to separate Jews from the rest of society, sovereigns allowed them to be pawnbrokers, as a sort of privilege. Jews were the only members of the population who could practice this activity as it was forbidden to Christians, and therefore was a concession (in reality an imposition) to Jews. The economy of the State could not exist without money-lending, therefore private citizens and even the Savoy kings themselves had to appeal to the Jews.

Jews in Piedmont lived together in specific areas, far away from churches and Catholic procession routes, but actual ghettos were created about a century and a half after Pope Paul the Fourth's 1555 imposition on the Jews in Rome.

The ghetto of Turin was built in 1679 and was enlarged in the 18th century. It had the characteristic galleries on the courtyard, along each side of the four walls. The ghetto was composed of two blocks of buildings, one between the roads Via Principe Amedeo, Via Bogino, Via Maria Vittoria and Via San Francesco da Paola, and the other one between Via Bogino, Via Des Ambrois and Piazza Carlina. In Via Maria Vittoria 25 and Via Des Ambrois 2 it is still possible to see the original ghetto gates. The inhabitants suffered diseases and deformities due to living in cramped and poorly ventilated conditions. On the roads were shops where Jews sold what few goods they could: second-hand items, ritual foods, and garments repaired by very skilled tailors. Within the ghetto were two Synagogues with Italian and Spanish liturgies. There was also a school (Talmud Torah) which Jewish children attended from the age of three.

== Modern history ==
At the end of the 19th century, the European Reform movement and especially the French Revolution gave political and civil rights to the Jews on the other side of the Alps.

With the Napoleonic occupation of northern Italy these rights were given also to Italian Jews, starting with the Communities of Piedmont. After the emancipation, Jews abandoned their traditional occupation of moneylender. They began to take up every profession including the military, and as they could now purchase property and own businesses, they founded large textile companies which offered employment to hundreds of Jews and Christians.

After the defeat of Napoleon I in 1814, king Vittorio Emanuele the First was restored to the throne. He reinstated all the old anti-Semitic prohibitions and laws, apart from the forced wearing of the yellow mark. The first attempt at Emancipation was over, but in the meantime society had changed. The liberal movement had grown, and the monarchy was transformed from Absolute to Constitutional. This transformation also affected the mindset of the Piedmontese leadership. Important political figures such as Count Cavour and the brothers Massimo and Roberto d'Azeglio, pleaded for the extension of the constitutional rights of freedom and equality to oppressed minorities in the kingdom, including Jews and Waldensians. Eventually, King Carlo Alberto (1831–1849) made a Parliamentary decision in July 1848 permitting the extension of all civil and political rights to the Jews. He proclaimed that differences between religions were no longer a reason for discrimination.

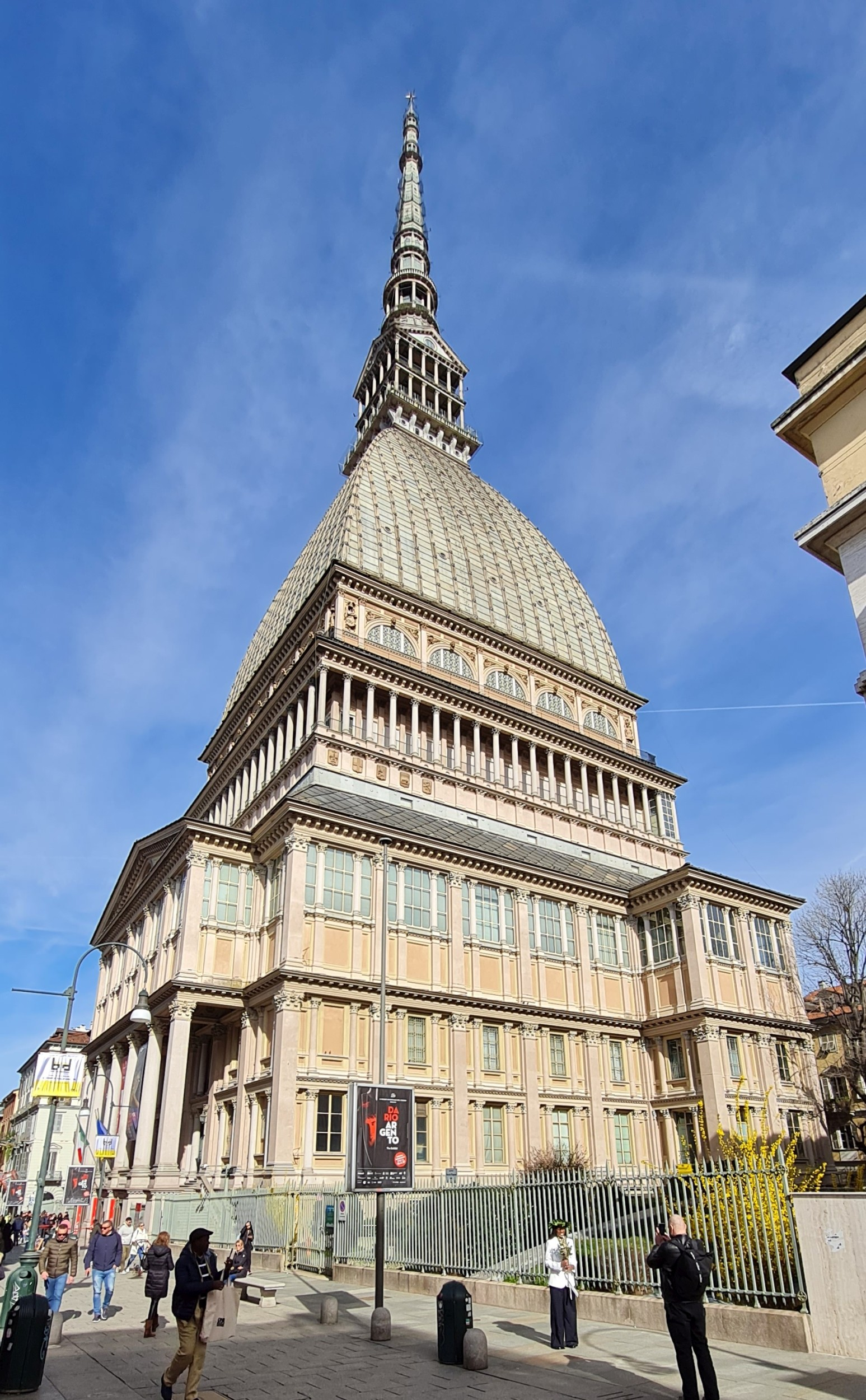
The Mole Antonelliana in Turin was conceived and constructed as a synagogue.

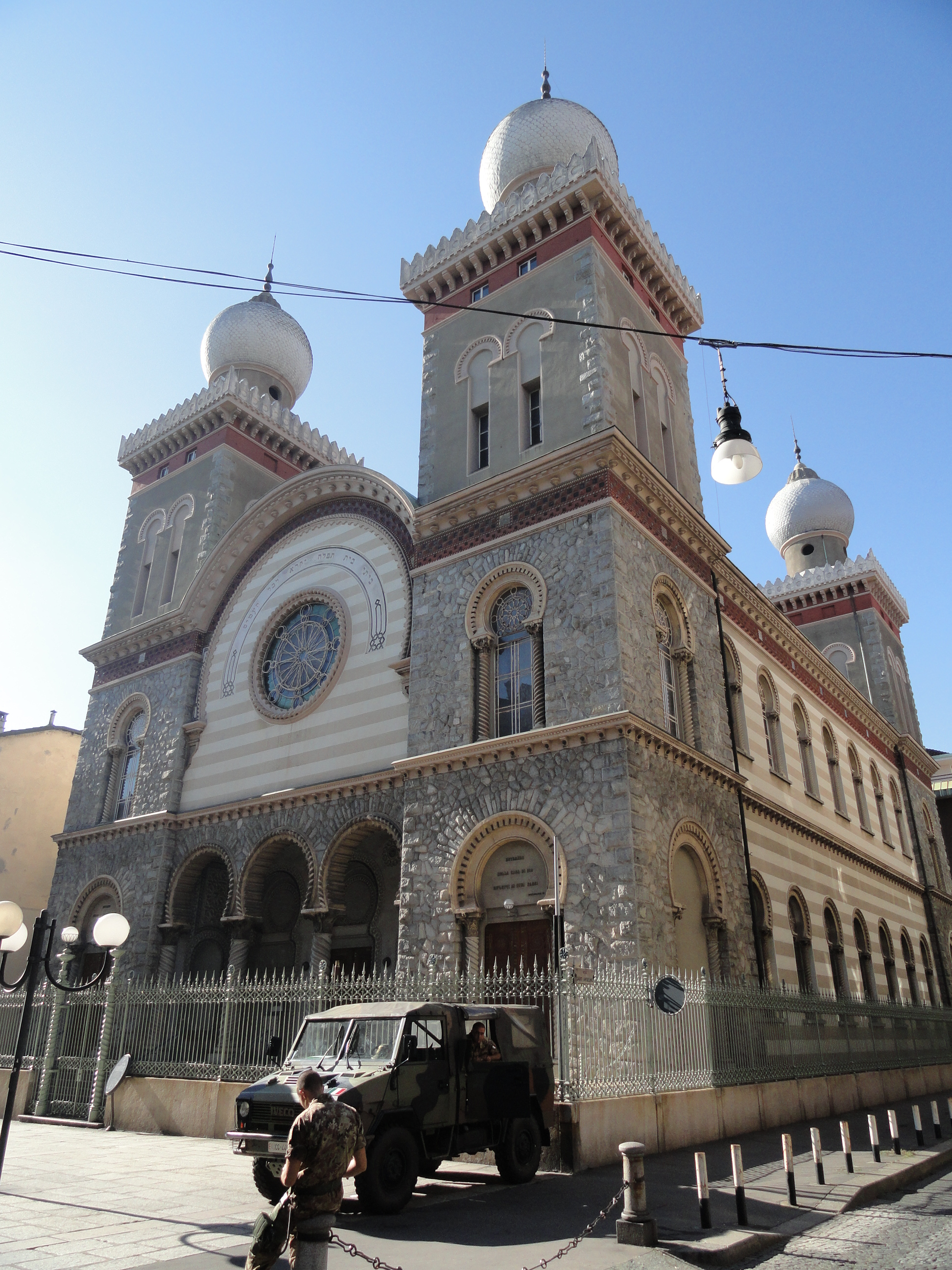
Synagogue of Turin

As a result of the Emancipation of 1848, Jews began a new life: they could practice any profession or commercial activity and could participate actively in political life, which they did with great determination and success. The building of the Mole Antonelliana, later the symbol of Turin, was originally commissioned by Turin Jewry as a celebration of their emancipation when the city became the capital of Italy in 1861. However, the Mole was never used as a synagogue, and the project was soon sold to the City of Turin in order to facilitate the purchase of another piece of land and start again with a slightly smaller project. Between 1848 and 1861, the rights given to the Jews of Piedmont were extended to the rest of the Jewish Communities of Italy – not including Rome and Papal territories – as each territory of the peninsula joined the kings of Savoy in the Unification of Italy. A new Jewish cemetery was opened in 1867. The Jewish community moved the ancient burial stones (16th – 17th century) from the older Jewish cemetery to the new one.

By leaving the ghettos, it became inevitable that Jews would start to assimilate. This process concerned the rabbis and Jews, who feared the loss of their unique identity. After a few generations some Piedmontese Jewish Communities became depopulated by assimilation, and urbanisation.

== Holocaust ==
By 1901, the Jews of Turin and the surrounding areas reached a population of 5,700. In the 1920s and 1930s with the growth of Fascism in Europe, some Piedmontese Jews supported Italian Fascism. For a short time a Fascist Jewish periodical was published in Turin. In opposition to the old Zionist propaganda, the periodical, titled "La nostra bandiera" (our flag) exalted Italian nationalism and openly supported Fascism in its early stage. However, during this time, most Piedmont Jews developed a strong anti-Fascist stance, especially during the years of Benito Mussolini's dictatorship, and after the promulgation of the Racial Laws in 1938. Some become partisans after the fall of Fascism on September 8, 1943. The Jewish Primary School in Turin is named after Emanuele Artom, one of the young Jews who died in the name of freedom.

Many Jewish families were forced to leave their homes between 1941 and 1943, and lived in the country or in the mountains until the Liberation of the North of Italy in late April 1945. They were concealed by Italian families or by groups of partisans who took the life-threatening risk of hiding Jews. Despite this, all the Piedmontese Jewish Communities lost a very high number of members in the Nazi-fascist persecutions and deportations. Some of the smaller communities never recovered and closed their Synagogues after the War. Out of 1,414 Jewish citizens of Piedmont in 1938, about 400 people were deported and never came back. Today in the Porta Nuova railway station in Turin there is a memorial stone to the Jews deported to the Auschwitz concentration camp.

== Nowadays ==
Today in Piedmont there are three independent Jewish communities in Turin, Casale Monferrato and Vercelli. Other communities have been absorbed by Turin because of their small size, or because numbers dwindled completely, including in Acqui Terme, Alessandria, Asti, Carmagnola, Cherasco, Chieri, Cuneo, Ivrea, Fossano, Mondovì, Savigliano and Saluzzo.

In almost all of these cities the Jewish cemeteries and the ghetto buildings and synagogues are still preserved in their entirety.

The Jewish Community of Turin comprises approximately 950 Jews (with a high percentage of adults and elderly people) and has its own Nursery, Primary Schools, Old Age Home, a large library open to the public, a youth centre, the historic-artistic Archives and a social centre where many cultural activities are held.

The numerous contributions provided by public and private associations allowed the Jewish Community to restore the big Synagogue of Turin and the Synagogue of Carmagnola which is valuable for its typical Piedmontese Baroque style. The magnificent Synagogue of Casale Monferrato and the small one of Ivrea have already been restored. Although the Jewish population in Piedmont is decreasing, there still remain twelve synagogues, built both before and after the Emancipation.

The Community of Turin organises lectures and conferences for non-Jewish schools on the history of Judaism and Jewish life in Italy with the aim of providing cultural religious information and to stop the spread of anti-Semitism and racism.

== See also ==
- History of the Jews in Italy
- History of the Jews in Calabria
- History of the Jews in Livorno
- History of the Jews in Naples
- History of the Jews in the Roman Empire
- History of the Jews in Sicily
- History of the Jews in Trieste
- History of the Jews in Venice
- Carlo Levi
- Primo Levi
