= Primo Levi =

Italian Holocaust survivor and writer (1919–1987)

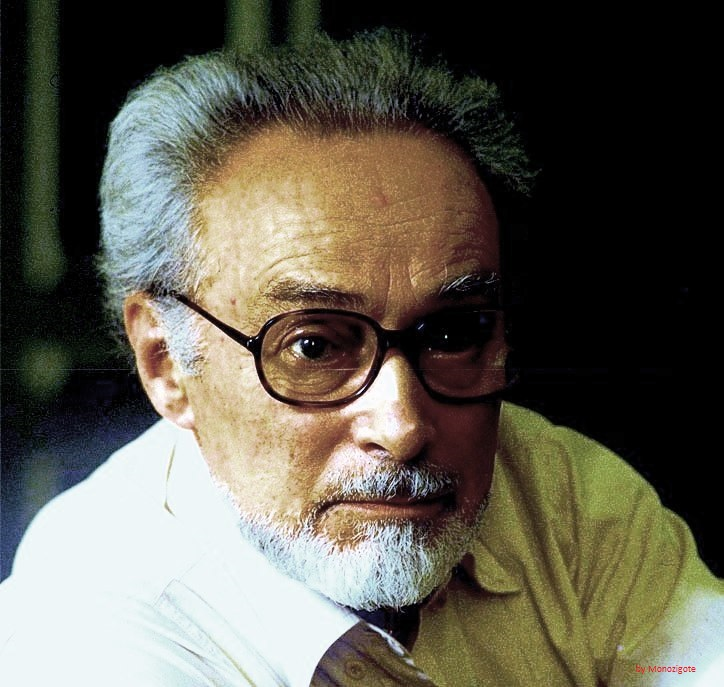
- Born: 31 July 1919; Turin, Italy
- Died: 11 April 1987 (aged 67); Turin, Italy
- Resting place: Monumental Cemetery, Turin, Italy
- Education: Degree in chemistry
- Alma mater: University of Turin
- Occupations: Writer, chemist
- Spouse: Lucia Morpurgo (m. 1947)
- Children: 2
- Writing career
- Pen name: Damiano Malabaila (used for some of his fictional works)
- Language: Italian
- Period: 1947–1986
- Genres: Autobiography, short story, essay
- Notable works: If This Is a Man; The Periodic Table

Primo Michele Levi (Italian: [ˈpriːmo ˈlɛːvi]; 31 July 1919 – 11 April 1987) was a Jewish Italian chemist, partisan, Holocaust survivor and writer. He was the author of several books, collections of short stories, essays, poems and one novel. His best-known works include: If This Is a Man (Se questo è un uomo, 1947, published as Survival in Auschwitz in the United States), his account of the year he spent as a prisoner in the Auschwitz concentration camp in Nazi-occupied Poland; and The Periodic Table (1975), a collection of mostly autobiographical short stories, each named after a chemical element which plays a role in each story, which the Royal Institution named the best science book ever written.

Levi died in 1987 from injuries sustained in a fall from a third-storey apartment landing. His death was officially ruled a suicide, although that has been disputed by some of his friends and associates and attributed to an accident.

== Biography ==
=== Early life ===
Levi was born in 1919 in Turin, at Corso Re Umberto 75, into a liberal Jewish family. They were Piedmontese Jews whose ancestors came from Spain following the 1492 expulsion. His father, Cesare Levi (1878–1942), worked for the manufacturing firm Ganz and spent much of his time working abroad in Hungary, where Ganz was based. Cesare was an avid reader and autodidact. Levi's mother, Esterina (Ester Luzzati Levi, 1895–1991), known to everyone as Rina, was well educated, having attended the Istituto Maria Letizia. She too was an avid reader, played the piano, and spoke fluent French. The marriage between Rina and Cesare had been arranged by Rina's father. On their wedding day, Rina's father, Cesare Luzzati, gave Rina the apartment at Corso Re Umberto, where Primo Levi lived for almost his entire life.

In 1921, Anna Maria, Levi's sister, was born, and he remained close to her all her life. In 1925, he entered the Felice Rignon primary school in Turin. A thin and delicate child, he was shy and considered himself ugly, but excelled academically. His school record includes long periods of absence during which he was tutored at home, at first by Emilia Glauda and then by Marisa Zini, daughter of philosopher Zino Zini. The children spent summers with their mother in the Waldensian valleys south-west of Turin, where Rina rented a farmhouse. His father remained in the city, partly because of his dislike of the rural life, but also because of his infidelities.

In September 1930, Levi entered the Massimo d'Azeglio Royal Gymnasium a year ahead of normal entrance requirements. In class, he was the youngest, the shortest and the cleverest, as well as being the only Jew. Only two boys there bullied him for being Jewish, but their animosity was traumatic. In August 1932, following two years attendance at the Talmud Torah school in Turin to pick up the elements of doctrine and culture, he sang in the local synagogue for his Bar Mitzvah. In 1933, as was expected of all young Italian schoolboys, he joined the Avanguardisti movement for young Fascists. He avoided rifle drill by joining the ski division, and spent every Saturday during the season on the slopes above Turin. As a young boy, Levi was plagued by illness, particularly chest infections, but he was keen to participate in physical activity. In his teens, Levi and a few friends would sneak into a disused sports stadium and conduct athletic competitions.

In July 1934, at the age of 15, he sat the exams for the Liceo Classico D'Azeglio, a lyceum (sixth form or senior high school) specializing in the classics, and was admitted that year. The school was noted for its anti-Fascist teachers, among them the philosopher Norberto Bobbio, and Cesare Pavese, who later became one of Italy's best-known novelists. Levi continued to be bullied during his time at the Lyceum, although six other Jews were in his class. Upon reading Concerning the Nature of Things by English scientist William Henry Bragg, Levi decided that he wanted to be a chemist.

In 1937, he was summoned before the War Ministry and accused of ignoring a draft notice from the Italian Royal Navy. It was one day before he was to write a final examination on Italy's participation in the Spanish Civil War, based on a quote from Thucydides: "We have the singular merit of being brave to the utmost degree." Distracted and terrified by the draft accusation, he failed the exam—the first poor grade of his life—and was devastated. His father was able to keep him out of the Navy by enrolling him in the Fascist militia (Milizia Volontaria per la Sicurezza Nazionale). He remained a member through his first year of university, until the passage of the Italian racial laws in 1938 forced his expulsion. Levi later recounted that series of events in the short story Fra Diavolo on the Po.

He retook and passed his final examinations and, in October, enrolled at the University of Turin to study chemistry. As one of 80 candidates, he spent three months taking lectures, and in February, after passing his colloquio (oral examination), he was selected as one of 20 to move on to the full-time chemistry curriculum.

During the liberal period in Italy, as well as in the first decade of the Fascist regime, Jews held many public positions, and were prominent in literature, science and politics. In 1929, Mussolini signed the Lateran Treaty with the Catholic Church, which established Catholicism as the State religion, allowed the Church to influence many sectors of education and public life, and relegated other religions to the status of "tolerated cults". In 1936, Italy's conquest of Ethiopia, and the expansion of what the regime regarded as the Italian "colonial empire", brought the question of "race" to the forefront. In the context set by those events and the 1939 alliance with Hitler's Germany, the situation of the Jews of Italy changed radically.

In July 1938, a group of prominent Italian scientists and intellectuals published the "Manifesto of Race", a mixture of racial and ideological antisemitic theories from ancient and modern sources. The treatise formed the basis of the Italian Racial Laws of October 1938. After their enactment, Italian Jews lost their basic civil rights, positions in public offices, and their assets. Their books were prohibited, and Jewish writers could no longer publish in magazines owned by Aryans. Jewish students who had begun their course of study were permitted to continue, but new Jewish students were barred from entering university. Levi had matriculated a year earlier than scheduled, enabling him to take a degree.

In 1939, Levi discovered a passion for mountain hiking. A friend, Sandro Delmastro, taught him how to hike, and they spent many weekends in the mountains above Turin. Levi later wrote about that time in the chapter "Iron" in The Periodic Table: "To see Sandro in the mountains reconciled you with the world and made you forget the nightmare weighing on Europe [...] He stirred in me a new communion with earth and sky, in which my need for freedom, the fullness of my powers, and the hunger to understand things that had driven me to chemistry converged."

In June 1940, as an ally of Germany, Italy declared war against Britain and France, and the first Allied air raids on Turin began two days later. Levi's studies continued during the bombardments. The family suffered additional strain as his father became bedridden with bowel cancer.

=== Chemistry ===
Because of the new racial laws and the increasing intensity of Fascist action, Levi had difficulty finding an advisor for his Ph.D. dissertation, which was on the subject of the Walden inversion, a study of the asymmetry of the carbon atom. Eventually taken on by Dr. Nicolò Dallaporta, Levi graduated in mid-1941 with full marks and merit, having submitted additional theses on x-rays and electrostatic energy. His degree certificate bore the remark: "of Jewish race". The racial laws prevented Levi from finding a suitable permanent job after graduation.

In December 1941, he received an informal job offer from an Italian officer to work as a chemist at an asbestos mine in San Vittore. The project was to extract nickel from the mine spoil, a challenge he accepted with pleasure. Levi later understood that, if successful, he would be aiding the German war effort, which was suffering nickel shortages in the production of armaments. The job required Levi to work under a false name with false papers. Three months later, in March 1942, his father died. Levi left the mine in June to work in Milan for the Swiss pharmaceutical manufacturer Wander AG, on a project to extract an anti-diabetic from vegetable matter. Recruited through a fellow student at Turin University, he took the job in a Swiss company to escape the Italian race laws. It soon became clear that the project had no chance of succeeding, but it was in no-one's interest to say so.

In July 1943, King Victor Emmanuel III deposed Mussolini and appointed a new government under Marshal Pietro Badoglio, which prepared to sign the Armistice of Cassibile with the Allies. When the armistice was made public on 8 September, the Germans occupied northern and central Italy, liberated Mussolini from imprisonment, and appointed him as head of the Italian Social Republic, a puppet state in German-occupied northern Italy. Levi returned to Turin to find his mother and sister in refuge at their country estate "Il Saccarello", by Superga in the hills outside Turin. The three moved to Saint-Vincent in the Aosta Valley, where they could be hidden. Being pursued as Jews, many of whom had already been interned by the authorities, they moved up the hillside to Amay in the Col de Joux, a rebellious area highly suitable for guerrilla activities.

=== Italian resistance movement ===
The Italian resistance movement became increasingly active in the German-occupied zone. Levi and some comrades took to the foothills of the Alps and, in October, formed a partisan group in the hope of being affiliated with the liberal Giustizia e Libertà. Untrained for such a venture, he and his companions were arrested by the Fascist militia on 13 December 1943. Believing he would be shot as an Italian partisan, Levi confessed to being Jewish. He was sent to the internment camp at Fossoli near Modena.

Levi later wrote the following about the conditions at Fossoli:

We were given, on a regular basis, a food ration destined for the soldiers and at the end of January 1944, we were taken to Fossoli on a passenger train. Our conditions in the camp were quite good. There was no talk of executions and the atmosphere was quite calm. We were allowed to keep the money we had brought with us and to receive money from the outside. We worked in the kitchen in turn and performed other services in the camp. We even prepared a dining room, a rather sparse one, I must admit.

=== Auschwitz ===
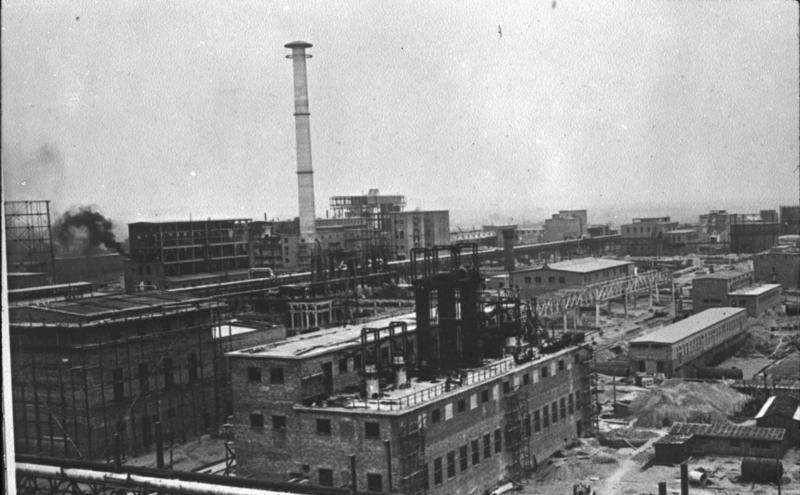
IG Farben factory in Monowitz (near Auschwitz) 1941 50.036094°N 19.275534°E

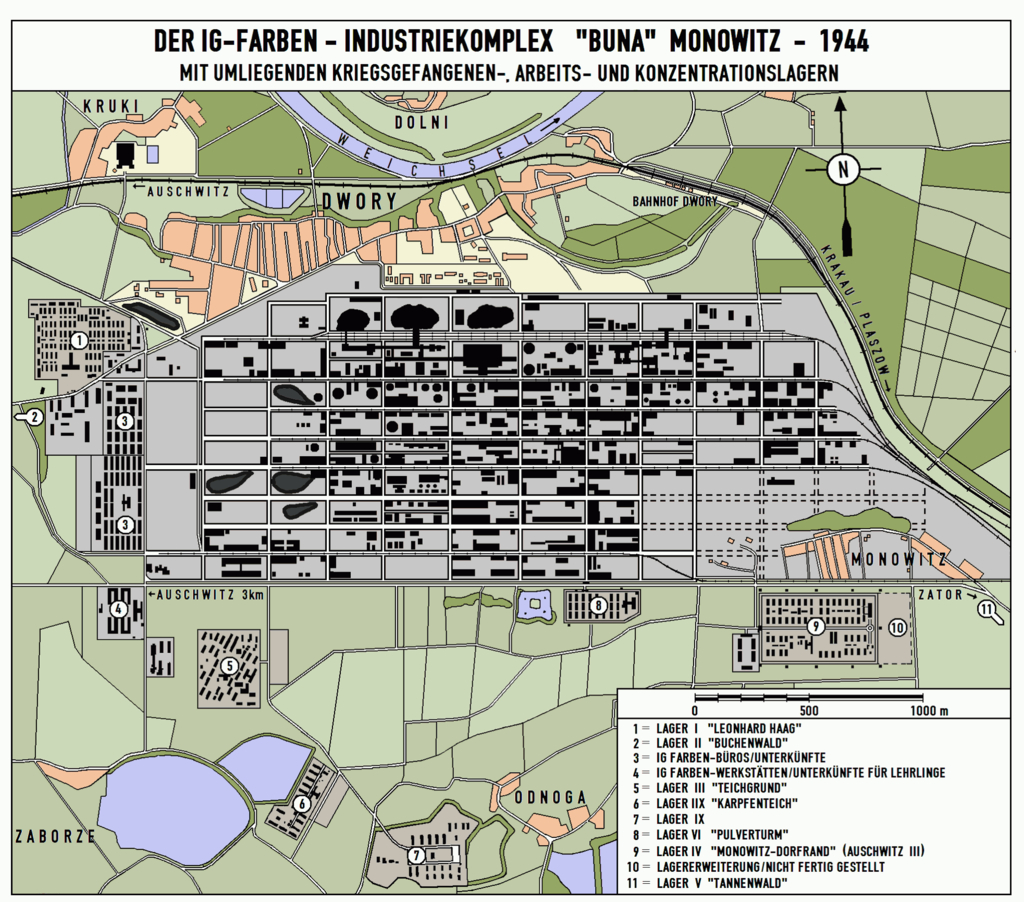
Buna Werke, Monowitz and subcamps

Fossoli was taken over by the Germans, who started arranging the deportations of the Jews to eastern concentration and death camps. On 21 February 1944, on the second of the transports, Levi and other inmates were transported in twelve cramped cattle trucks to Monowitz, one of the three main camps in the Auschwitz concentration camp complex. Levi (record number 174517) spent eleven months there before the camp was liberated by the Red Army on 27 January 1945. Before the arrival of the Russians, inmates were sorted according to whether they could work or not. An acquaintance of Levi's said that neither classification would make any difference in the end. He declared he was unable to work and was killed immediately. Of the 650 Italian Jews in his transport, Levi was one of only twenty who left the camps alive. The average life expectancy of a new entrant to the camp was three to four months.

Levi knew some German from reading German publications on chemistry, and he worked to adjust quickly to life in the camp without attracting the attention of the privileged inmates. He used bread to pay a more experienced Italian prisoner to help him improve his German and understand how to cope in Auschwitz. He was given a smuggled soup ration each day by Lorenzo Perrone, an Italian civilian bricklayer who was working at Auschwitz as a forced labourer. Levi's professional qualifications were useful to the Germans and, in mid-November 1944, he secured a position as an assistant in IG Farben's Buna Werke laboratory that was aiming to produce synthetic rubber. By avoiding hard labour in freezing outdoor temperatures he was able to survive, as well as by stealing materials from the laboratory and trading them for extra food. Shortly before the camp was liberated by the Red Army, he fell ill with scarlet fever and was placed in the camp's sanatorium (camp hospital). On 18 January 1945, the SS hurriedly evacuated the camp as the Red Army approached, forcing all but the gravely ill on a long death march to a site further from the front. The march resulted in the deaths of the vast majority of the remaining prisoners, but Levi's illness spared him that fate.

Although liberated on 27 January 1945, Levi did not reach Turin until 19 October 1945. After spending some time in a Soviet camp for former concentration camp inmates, he embarked on an arduous journey home in the company of former Italian prisoners of war who had been part of the Italian Army in Russia. The long railway journey home to Turin took him on a circuitous route from Poland, through Belarus, Ukraine, Romania, Hungary, Austria, and Germany – an arduous journey described especially in his 1963 work The Truce – noting the millions of displaced people on the roads and trains throughout Europe in that period.

=== Writing career ===
==== 1946–1960 ====
Levi was almost unrecognisable on his return to Turin. Malnutrition edema had bloated his face. Sporting a scrawny beard and wearing an old Red Army uniform, he returned to Corso Re Umberto. The next few months gave him an opportunity to recover physically, re-establish contact with surviving friends and family, and start looking for work. Levi suffered from the psychological trauma of his experiences. Having been unable to find work in Turin, he started to look for work in Milan. On his train journeys, he began to tell people he met stories about his time at Auschwitz.

At a Jewish New Year party in 1946, he met Lucia Morpurgo, who offered to teach him to dance, and Levi fell in love with her. At about that time, he started writing poetry about his experiences in Auschwitz.

On 21 January 1946, he started work at DUCO, a DuPont paint factory outside Turin. Because of the extremely limited train service, Levi stayed in the factory dormitory during the week, which gave him the opportunity to write undisturbed, and he started the first draft of If This Is a Man. Every day, as memories came to him, he scribbled notes on train tickets and scraps of paper. At the end of February, he had ten pages detailing the last ten days between the German evacuation and the arrival of the Red Army. For the next ten months, the book took shape in his dormitory as he typed up his recollections each night.

On 22 December 1946, the manuscript was complete. Lucia, who now reciprocated Levi's love, helped him to edit it, to make the narrative flow more naturally. In January 1947, Levi was taking the finished manuscript around to publishers. It was rejected by Einaudi on the advice of Natalia Ginzburg and, in the United States, it was turned down by Little, Brown and Company on the advice of rabbi Joshua Liebman, an opinion which contributed to the neglect of his work in that country for four decades. The social wounds of the war years were still too fresh, and he had no literary experience to give him a reputation as an author.

Eventually, Levi found a publisher, Franco Antonicelli, through a friend of his sister. Antonicelli was an amateur publisher, but as an active anti-Fascist, he supported the substance of the book.

At the end of June 1947, Levi suddenly left DUCO and teamed up with an old friend Alberto Salmoni to run a chemical consultancy from the top floor of Salmoni's parents' house. Many of Levi's experiences of that time found their way into his later writing. He and Salmoni made most of their money from making and supplying stannous chloride for mirror makers, delivering the unstable chemical by bicycle across the city. Attempts to make lipsticks from reptile excreta, and a coloured enamel to coat teeth, were turned into short stories. Accidents in their laboratory filled the Salmoni house with unpleasant smells and corrosive gases.

In September 1947, Levi married Lucia and, a month later, on 11 October, If This Is a Man was published, with a print run of 2,000 copies. In April 1948, with Lucia pregnant with their first child, Levi decided that the life of an independent chemist was too precarious. He agreed to work for Accatti in the family paint business, which traded under the name SIVA. In October 1948, his daughter Lisa was born.

During that period, his friend Lorenzo Perrone's physical and psychological health declined. Lorenzo had been a civilian forced worker in Auschwitz, who for six months had given part of his ration and a piece of bread to Levi without asking for anything in return, and the gesture saved Levi's life. In his memoir, Levi contrasted Lorenzo with everyone else in the camp, prisoners and guards alike, as someone who managed to preserve his humanity. After the war, Lorenzo could not cope with the memories of what he had seen and descended into alcoholism. Levi made several trips to rescue his old friend from the streets but, in 1952, Lorenzo died. In gratitude for his kindness in Auschwitz, Levi named both of his children, Lisa Lorenza and Renzo, after him.

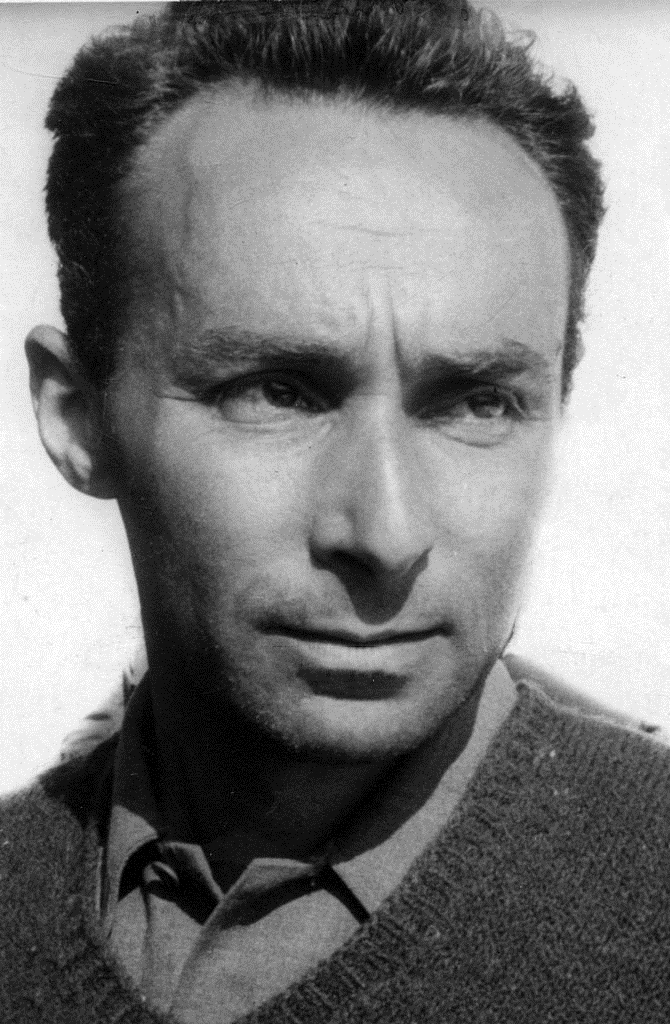
Levi, 1950s

In 1950, having demonstrated his chemical talents to Accatti, Levi was promoted to Technical Director at SIVA. As SIVA's principal chemist and troubleshooter, Levi travelled abroad. He made several trips to Germany and carefully engineered his contacts with senior German businessmen and scientists. Wearing short-sleeved shirts, he made sure they saw the concentration camp number tattooed on his arm.

He became involved in organisations pledged to remembering and recording the horror of the camps. In 1954, he visited Buchenwald to mark the ninth anniversary of the camp's liberation from the Nazis. Levi dutifully attended many such anniversary events over the years and recounted his own experiences. In July 1957, his son Renzo was born.

Despite a positive review by Italo Calvino in L'Unità, only 1,500 copies of If This Is a Man were sold. In 1958, Einaudi, a major publisher, published it in a revised form and promoted it.

In 1958 Stuart Woolf, in close collaboration with Levi, translated If This Is a Man into English, and it was published in the UK by Orion Press in 1959. Also in 1959, Heinz Riedt, under close supervision by Levi, translated the book into German. Because one of Levi's primary reasons for writing the book was to get the German people to realise what had been done in their name, and to accept at least partial responsibility, that translation was perhaps the most significant to him.

==== 1961–1974 ====
Levi began writing The Truce early in 1961. It was published in 1963, almost 16 years after his first book, and won the first annual Premio Campiello literary award that year. It is often published in one volume with If This Is a Man, because it covers his long return through eastern Europe from Auschwitz. Levi's reputation was growing, and he regularly contributed articles to La Stampa, the Turin newspaper. He worked to gain a reputation as a writer about subjects other than surviving Auschwitz.

In 1963, he suffered his first major bout of depression. At the time he had two young children, and a responsible job at a factory where accidents could and did have terrible consequences. He travelled and became a public figure. But the memory of what happened less than twenty years earlier still burned in his mind. Today, the link between such trauma and depression is better understood. Doctors prescribed several different drugs over the years, but they had variable efficacy and side effects.

In 1964, Levi collaborated with the state broadcaster RAI on a radio play based on If This Is a Man and, in 1966, with a theatre production.

Under the pen name of Damiano Malabaila, he published two volumes of science fiction short stories which explored ethical and philosophical questions. They imagined the effects on society of inventions which many would consider beneficial, but which, he saw, would have serious implications. Many of the stories from the two books Storie naturali (Natural Histories, 1966) and Vizio di forma (Structural Defect, 1971) were later collected and published in English as The Sixth Day and Other Tales.

In 1974, Levi arranged to go into semi-retirement from SIVA in order to have more time to write. He also wanted to escape the burden of responsibility involved in managing the paint plant.

==== 1975–1987 ====
In 1975, a collection of Levi's poetry was published under the title L'osteria di Brema (The Bremen Beer Hall), which was published in English as Shema: Collected Poems.

He wrote two other highly praised memoirs, Lilit e altri racconti (Moments of Reprieve, 1978) and Il sistema periodico (The Periodic Table, 1975). Moments of Reprieve deals with characters he observed during imprisonment. The Periodic Table is a collection of mostly autobiographical short stories, and also includes two fictional stories that he wrote in 1941 while being employed at the asbestos mine in San Vittore. Each story is named after a chemical element and the subject matter of each story is related to that element. On 19 October 2006, the Royal Institution in London declared that The Periodic Table was the best science book ever written.

In 1977, at the age of 58, Levi retired as a part-time consultant at the SIVA paint factory to devote himself full-time to writing. Like all his books, La chiave a stella (1978), published in the US in 1986 as The Monkey Wrench and in the UK in 1987 as The Wrench, is difficult to categorize. Some reviews describe it as a collection of stories about work and workers, told by a narrator who resembles Levi. Others have called it a novel, created by the linked stories and characters. Set in the Fiat-run Russian company town of Togliattigrad, it portrays the engineer as a hero on whom others depend. The Piedmontese engineer Faussone travelled the world as an expert in erecting cranes and bridges. Most of the stories involve the solution of industrial problems by the use of troubleshooting skills, and many stories come from the author's personal experience. The underlying philosophy is that pride in one's work is necessary for fulfilment. The Wrench won the Strega Prize in 1979 and brought Levi a wider audience in Italy, though left-wing critics regretted that he did not describe the harsh working conditions on the assembly lines at Fiat.

In 1984, Levi published his only novel, If Not Now, When?—or his second novel, if The Monkey Wrench is counted. It traces the fortunes of a group of Jewish partisans behind German lines during World War II as they seek to survive and continue their fight against the occupier. With the ultimate goal of reaching Palestine to take part in the development of a Jewish national home, the partisan band reaches Poland and then German territory. There, the surviving members are officially received as displaced persons in territory held by the Western allies. Finally, they succeed in reaching Italy, on their way to Palestine. The novel won both the Premio Campiello and the Premio Viareggio.

The book was inspired by events during Levi's train journey home after liberation from the concentration camp, which was narrated in The Truce. At one point in the journey, a band of Zionists hitched their wagon to the refugee train. Levi was impressed by their strength, resolve, organisation and sense of purpose.

Levi became a major literary figure in Italy, and his books were translated into many other languages. The Truce became a standard text in Italian schools. In 1985, he flew to the United States for a 20-day speaking tour. Although he was accompanied by Lucia, the trip was very draining for him.

In the Soviet Union, his early works were not accepted by censors because he had portrayed Soviet soldiers as slovenly and disorderly rather than heroic. In Israel, a country formed partly by Jewish survivors who lived through horrors similar to those Levi described, many of his works were not translated and published until after his death.

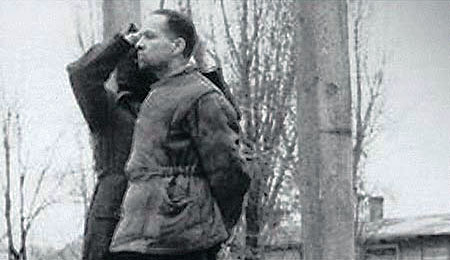
Rudolf Höss immediately before being hanged

In March 1985, he wrote the introduction to the re-publication of the autobiography of Rudolf Höss, who was commandant of Auschwitz concentration camp from 1940 to 1943. In it, he writes: "It's filled with evil ... and reading it is agony."

Also in 1985, a volume of his essays, previously published in La Stampa, was published under the title L'altrui mestiere (Other People's Trades). Levi used to write the stories and hoard them, releasing them to La Stampa at the rate of about one a week. The essays ranged from book reviews and ponderings about strange things in nature, to fictional short stories.

In 1986, his book I sommersi e i salvati (The Drowned and the Saved) was published. In it, he tries to analyse why people behaved the way they did at Auschwitz and why some survived whilst others perished. In his typical style, he makes no judgments but presents the evidence and asks the questions. For example, one essay examines what he calls "the grey zone": those Jews who did the Germans' dirty work for them and kept the rest of the prisoners in line. He questioned what made a concert violinist behave as a callous taskmaster.

Also in 1986, a collection of short stories, previously published in La Stampa, was assembled and published as Racconti e saggi, some of which were published in the English volume The Mirror Maker.

At the time of his death in April 1987, Levi was working on another selection of essays called The Double Bond, which took the form of letters to "La Signorina". The essays are very personal in nature, and approximately five or six chapters of the manuscript exist. Carole Angier, in her biography of Levi, describes how she tracked some of these essays down. She wrote that others were being kept from public view by Levi's close friends, to whom he gave them, and they might have been destroyed.

==== Posthumous publications ====
In March 2007, Harper's Magazine published an English translation of Levi's story "Knall", about a fictitious weapon that is fatal at close range but harmless more than a meter away. It originally appeared in his 1971 book Vizio di forma but was published in English for the first time by Harper's.

A Tranquil Star, a collection of seventeen stories translated into English by Ann Goldstein and Alessandra Bastagli was published in April 2007.

In 2015, Penguin published The Complete Works of Primo Levi, ed. Ann Goldstein. This is the first time that Levi's entire oeuvre has been translated into English.

=== Death ===
Levi died on 11 April 1987 after a fall from the interior landing of his third-story apartment in Turin to the ground floor below. The coroner ruled his death a suicide. Three of his biographers (Angier, Thomson and Anissimov) agreed, but other writers (including at least one who knew him personally) questioned that determination.

In his later life, Levi indicated that he was suffering from depression. Factors in that likely included responsibility for his elderly mother and mother-in-law, with whom he was living, and lingering traumatic memories. According to the chief rabbi of Rome Elio Toaff, Levi telephoned him for the first time ten minutes before the incident. Levi said he found it impossible to look at his mother, who was ill with cancer, without recalling the faces of people stretched out on benches in Auschwitz. The Nobel laureate and fellow Holocaust survivor Elie Wiesel said, at the time, "Primo Levi died at Auschwitz forty years later."

However, several of Levi's friends and associates have argued otherwise. The Oxford sociologist Diego Gambetta noted that Levi left no suicide note, nor any other indication that he was considering suicide. Documents and testimony suggested that he had plans for both the short- and longer-term at the time. In the days before his death, he had complained to his physician of dizziness due to an operation he had undergone some three weeks earlier. After visiting the apartment complex, Gambetta suggested that Levi lost his balance and fell accidentally. The Nobel laureate Rita Levi-Montalcini, a close friend of Levi, agreed. "As a chemical engineer," she said, "he might have chosen a better way [of exiting the world] than jumping into a narrow stairwell with the risk of remaining paralyzed."

== Legacy ==
=== Holocaust writing ===
Levi is frequently referred to as a "Holocaust writer", a label he disliked. However, he is considered to have authored some of the most important writings about the Holocaust, which has greatly contributed to the memory and understanding of such a horrific time. Philip Roth eulogized him as someone who "set out systematically to remember the German hell on earth, steadfastly to think it through, and then to render it comprehensible in lucid, unpretentious prose". Martin Amis has credited Levi's work with assisting him in writing his own novel, The Zone of Interest, calling him "the visionary of the Holocaust, its presiding spirit and the most perceptive of all writers on this subject."

=== Posthumous honours ===
- In 1995, five health and human rights organizations established the Primo Levi Center in Paris to provide services to torture survivors. The center was named for Levi because his name is "synonymous with the refusal of inhuman, cruel and degrading treatment".
- The Primo Levi Center, a non-profit organisation dedicated to studying the history and culture of Italian Jewry, was established in New York City in 2003.
- In 2008, the City of Turin and other partners established the International Primo Levi Studies Center to preserve and promote Levi's legacy.
- Beginning in 2017, the Primo Levi Prize has been awarded by the German Chemical Society and the Italian Chemical Society to honour chemists for their commitment to human rights.
- In 2019, Levi's 100th birthday was commemorated throughout the world, including the United States, Portugal, and Italy.
- The SIVA factory has been turned into the Museo della Chimica, a chemistry museum for children. Levi's former office now holds an exhibit about his life.

=== In popular culture ===
- Till My Tale is Told: Women's Memoirs of the Gulag (1999), uses a part of the quatrain by Coleridge quoted by Levi in The Drowned and the Saved as its title.
- Christopher Hitchens's book The Portable Atheist, a collection of extracts of atheist texts, is dedicated to the memory of Levi, "who had the moral fortitude to refuse false consolation even while enduring the 'selection' process in Auschwitz". The dedication quotes Levi in The Drowned and the Saved, asserting, "I too entered the Lager as a nonbeliever, and as a nonbeliever I was liberated and have lived to this day."
- A quotation from Levi appears on the sleeve of the second album by the Welsh rock band Manic Street Preachers, titled Gold Against the Soul. The quote is from Levi's poem "Song of Those Who Died in Vain".
- David Blaine has Primo Levi's Auschwitz camp number, 174517, tattooed on his left forearm.
- In Lavie Tidhar's novel, A Man Lies Dreaming, the protagonist encounters Levi and Ka-Tzetnik in Auschwitz and witnesses them discuss how they should write about the Holocaust. Levi says they should be "accurate and dispassionate" while Ka-Tzetnik advocates "the language of [...] pulp".
- In the pilot episode of Black Earth Rising, Rwandan genocide survivor Kate Ashby has a therapy session addressing her survivors' guilt and suicide attempt. She tells her therapist that she has read the Primo Levi book he'd assigned her and that if she chooses to attempt suicide, she'll "take a leaf out of Mr Levi's book and jump straight out the window."
- The last track on The Noise by Peter Hammill is entitled "Primo on the Parapet".

== Views ==
=== Nazi death camps versus Soviet gulags ===
Levi vigorously repudiated historical revisionist attitudes in German historiography that emerged in the Historikerstreit, led by the works of people like Andreas Hillgruber and Ernst Nolte, who drew parallels between Nazism and Stalinism. Levi rejected the idea that the labor camp system depicted in Aleksandr Solzhenitsyn's The Gulag Archipelago and that of the Nazi Lager (German: Konzentrationslager; see Nazi concentration camps) were comparable. The death rate in Stalin's gulags was 30% at worst, he wrote, while in the extermination camps, he estimated it to be 90–98%.

His view was that the Nazi death camps and the attempted annihilation of the Jews were a horror unique in history because the goal was the complete destruction of a race by one that saw itself as superior. He noted that it was highly organized and mechanized, and entailed the degradation of Jews to the point of using their ashes as materials for paths.

The purpose of the Nazi extermination camps was not the same as the purpose of Stalin's gulags, Levi wrote in an appendix to If This Is a Man, though it is a "lugubrious comparison between two models of hell." The goal of the Lager was the extermination of the Jewish race in Europe, and no one could renounce Judaism, because the Nazis considered Jews a racial group rather than a religious group. Levi, along with most of Turin's Jewish intellectuals, had not been religiously observant before World War II, but the Italian racial laws and the Nazi camps impressed his identity as a Jew upon him. Of the many children who were deported to the camps, almost all of them were murdered.

=== German people ===
According to biographer Ian Thomson, Levi intentionally excluded from If This Is a Man any experiences with Germans who helped him and included "collective condemnations, coloured by the author's rage, of the German people". Levi's opinion of Germans improved through his friendship with a German woman named Hety Schmitt-Maas. Her father had lost his job and she had been expelled from school due to their anti-Nazi beliefs. For 17 years, Levi and Schmitt-Maas discussed "their shared hatred of Nazism" together in their letters to each other until Schmitt-Maas died in 1983.

Almost forty years after If This Is A Man was published, Levi stated that he did not hate German people because hating a whole ethnic group would be too much like Nazism. He also stated that he did not forgive "the culprits". According to Levi, the German people largely knew about the concentration camps but did not know the extent of the atrocities occurring there; "most Germans didn’t know because they didn’t want to know. Because, indeed, they wanted not to know".

=== Israel ===
Levi's view of Israel was conflicted. According to biographer Carole Angier, Levi became a Zionist during the Holocaust; however, he was concerned by Israel's militarism and treatment of Palestinians. According to Stefano Jesurum, Levi was not a Zionist. Levi himself, in an interview a year before his death, described himself as “95 percent Italian and 5 percent Jewish. I am not and never have been a Zionist, nor have I ever been tempted to go and live permanently in Israel.”

In 1967, shortly before the Six Days War, Levi made a speech at a Turin synagogue in which he called Israel "a country of witnesses and martyrs, of the insurgents of Warsaw, of Sobibór, and of Treblinka" and stated that: "The goal of inflicting dispersion and massacre on the survivors of dispersion and massacre is doubly criminal." Levi became disenchanted by Israel's militarism during the war and signed an open letter calling for peace between Jews and Arabs. The following year, he visited Israel for the only time in his life and it was different from what he had imagined. He disliked the militarism and, according to an acquaintance, expressed concern for the Palestinian refugees.

Levi was critical of Israel's invasion of Lebanon in 1982, co-writing an open letter denouncing it. He also published a piece in La Stampa, stating: "I feel indignant toward those who hastily compare the Israeli generals to Nazi generals, and yet I have to admit that [Menachem] Begin draws such judgments on himself." Levi later clarified that he did not believe Israel was attempting to exterminate Palestinians but that its response to Palestinian attacks were disproportionate. He told the journalist Filippo Gentiloni: “Everybody is somebody’s Jew”. Gentiloni wrote: "And today Palestinians are the Jews of the Israelis" in his article; this addition has been misattributed to Levi.

In a 1985 interview with Germaine Greer, Levi called the creation of Israel "a mistake in historical terms". In a 1986 interview with Stefano Jesurum, Levi talked about people he knew who lived in Israel, calling it "a State founded for those who were with me in the camps". He said that "the idea that Israel might someday be destroyed" is "unacceptable".

== Works ==
Title	Year	Type	English language translations
Se questo è un uomo	1947 and 1958	Memoir	If This Is a Man (US: Survival in Auschwitz)
La tregua	1963	Memoir	The Truce (US: The Reawakening)
Storie naturali (as Damiano Malabaila)	1966	Short stories	The Sixth Day and Other Tales
Vizio di forma	1971	Short stories	Mainly in The Sixth Day and Other Tales. Some stories are in A Tranquil Star
Il sistema periodico	1975	Short stories	The Periodic Table
L'osteria di Brema	1975	Poems	In Collected Poems
Lilìt e altri racconti	1981	Short stories	Part 1: Moments of Reprieve. Some stories from Parts 2 and 3 are in A Tranquil Star
La chiave a stella	1978	Novel	The Wrench (US: The Monkey's Wrench)
La ricerca delle radici	1981	Personal anthology	The Search for Roots: A Personal Anthology
Se non ora, quando?	1982	Novel	If Not Now, When?
Ad ora incerta	1984	Poems	In Collected Poems
L'altrui mestiere	1985	Essays	Other People's Trades
I sommersi e i salvati	1986	Essays	The Drowned and the Saved
Racconti e Saggi	1986	Essays	The Mirror Maker
Conversazioni e interviste 1963–1987	1997	Various (posthumous)	Conversations with Primo Levi and The Voice of Memory: Interviews, 1961–1987
	2005	Essays (posthumous)	The Black Hole of Auschwitz
	2006	Factual (posthumous)	Auschwitz Report
	2007	Short stories (posthumous)	A Tranquil Star
	2011	Short stories	The Magic Paint (Selection from A Tranquil Star)

== Adaptations ==
- Five of Levi's poems (Shema, 25 Febbraio 1944, Il canto del corvo, Cantare and Congedo) have been set to music by Simon Sargon in the song cycle Shema: 5 Poems of Primo Levi in 1987. In 2021 the work was performed by Megan Marie Hart during the opening event of the festival year 1700 Jahre jüdisches Leben in Deutschland commemorating the first documented mention of Jewish communities in the territory of present-day Germany.
- The 1997 film La Tregua (The Truce), starring John Turturro, was adapted from his 1963 memoir of the same title and recounts Levi's long journey home with other displaced people after his liberation from Auschwitz.
- If This Is a Man was adapted by Antony Sher into a one-man stage production Primo in 2004. A version of this production was broadcast on BBC Four in the UK on 20 September 2007.

== Bibliography ==
- Angier, Carole (2002). The Double Bond: Primo Levi: A Biography. London: Penguin. ISBN 978-0-14-016587-6.
- Anissimov, Myriam (1999). Primo Levi: Tragedy of an Optimist. New York: Overlook. ISBN 978-0-87951-806-6.
- Gordon, Robert (2007). The Cambridge Companion to Primo Levi. Cambridge: Cambridge. ISBN 978-0-521-60461-1.
- Thomson, Ian (2002). Primo Levi. London: Hutchison. ISBN 978-0-09-178531-4.
- Vincenti, Fiora (1981). Primo Levi. Mursia.
