= Giulio Einaudi =

Italian book publisher (1912–1999)

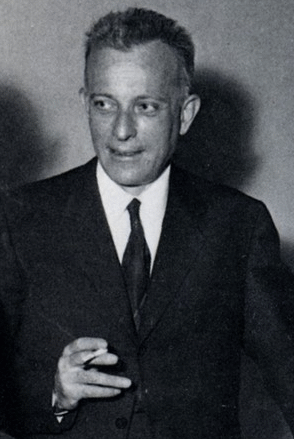
Giulio Einaudi

Giulio Einaudi (Italian pronunciation: [ˈdʒuːljo eiˈnaudi]; 2 January 1912 – 5 April 1999) was an Italian book publisher. The eponymous company that he founded in 1933 became "a European wellspring of fine literature, intellectual thought and political theory" and was once considered the most prestigious publishing house in Italy. He was also the author of books on literature, history, philosophy, art and science.

== Biography ==
Giulio Einaudi was born in Dogliani, in the Province of Cuneo, the son of Luigi Einaudi (1874–1961), future 2nd president of the Italian Republic, and his wife Ida, born Countess Pellegrini (1885–1968).

He attended the Liceo Classico Massimo d'Azeglio, and became a student of the anti-fascist Augusto Monti.

On 15 November 1933, he founded the publishing house Giulio Einaudi Editore, located on the third floor of Via Arcivescovado 7 in Turin (the same building that had hosted Antonio Gramsci's L'Ordine Nuovo).

Over his career, Einaudi published works by Carlo Levi, Gramsci, Cesare Pavese, Natalia Ginzburg, Italo Calvino, Norberto Bobbio, Primo Levi, American Henry A. Wallace, and Soviet leader Nikita S. Khrushchev, as well as Boris Pasternak's novel Dr. Zhivago in 1957 when it was banned in the Soviet Union. Einaudi, who had spoken against the creation of NATO, in 1964 was granted an early Western interview with the Soviet premier Nikita S. Khrushchev and, later, publishing rights to a Khrushchev book that signalled post-Stalin détente policy directions for the country.

In 1994, Einaudi's company was taken over by Mondadori, a publishing conglomerate controlled by former Italian prime minister Silvio Berlusconi. After working 64 years in the publishing business, Einaudi retired on 4 September 1997, aged 85, and died in Rome at the age of 87.

== Family ==
Einaudi was married to Renata Aldrovandi and had three sons, Mario, Riccardo and Ludovico, and a daughter, Giuliana. Ludovico is a pianist and composer.
Einaudi's brother Mario was a political scientist.
