= Bibliography of World War II memoirs and autobiographies =

This is a Bibliography of World War II memoirs and autobiographies. This list aims to include memoirs written by participants of World War II about their wartime experience, as well as larger autobiographies of participants of World War II that are at least partially concerned with the author's wartime experience. Works on this list should be all those primary accounts of World War II wartime experience intended for publication. The list does not aim to include diaries, private letter collections or transcripts of private conversations. It also should not include any prewar writings, setting the earliest dates of publication available for this list at 1937 (Second Sino-Japanese War), 1939 (European theater of World War II) and 1941 (Pacific War), depending on geographic context.

This article is part of the larger effort to document the Bibliography of World War II.

Individual memoirs of World War II that are notable enough to merit their own article are additionally collected in the World War II memoirs category and in the Holocaust personal accounts category.

Entries are listed primarily by the professional background, then secondarily by national background. The professional background is shown in the context of World War II and does not pay attention to prior or later assignment; for instance, Dwight D. Eisenhower is listed as a general, not as a political leader.

== Bibliography ==
=== Civilians, victims of genocide and persecution ===
==== France ====
- Delbo, Charlotte (1985) [1965–1985]. Auschwitz and After. Translated by Lamont, Rose C. Yale University Press.

==== Hungary ====
- Lengyel, Olga (1946) [1995]. Five Chimneys. Chicago Review Press. ISBN 0-89733-376-4.
- Stark, Israel (2015). Stark, Miriam (ed.). A Boy Named 68818. I. Starck. ISBN 978-1-68025-019-0. LCCN 2015945033.

==== Italy ====
- Levi, Primo (1988) [1984]. Collected Poems (Levi). Faber & Faber. ISBN 0-571-15255-4. OCLC 26362068.
- ————— (1988) [1986]. The Drowned and the Saved. Translated by Rosenthal, Raymond. Summit Books. ISBN 0-349-10047-0. OCLC 59150087.
- ————— (2005) [2002]. The Black Hole of Auschwitz. Polity Press. ISBN 0-7456-3241-6. OCLC 254931376.
- —————; de Benedetti, Leonardo (2006). Auschwitz Report. Translated by Woolf, Judith. Verso. ISBN 1-84467-092-9.

==== Poland ====
- Bauman, Janina (2006). Beyond These Walls, Escaping the Warsaw Ghetto – A Young Girl's Story. Virago/Little, Brown. ISBN 978-1-84408-319-0.
- Faber, David (2003). Kitchen, James D. (ed.). Because of Romek: a Holocaust survivor's memoir. Granite Hills Press. ISBN 0-9638886-2-5.
- Kramer, Clara (2009). Glantz, Stephen (ed.). Clara's War: One Girl's Story of Survival. Harper/Ecco. ISBN 978-0-06-172860-0.
- Sender, Ruth Minsky (1986). The Cage. Macmillan. ISBN 0-689-81321-X.
- Ungar, William (2000). Destined to Live. University Press of America.
- Yoran, Shalom (1996). The Defiant: A True Story of Jewish Vengeance and Survival. St. Martin's Press. ISBN 0-312-14585-3. OCLC 34690950.

==== United Kingdom ====
- Greenman, Leon (2001). An Englishman in Auschwitz. London: Vallentine Mitchell. ISBN 0-85303-424-9.

==== United States ====
- Houston, Jeanne Wakatsuki; Houston, James D. (1973). Farewell to Manzanar. Boston: Houghton Mifflin. — Victim of the Internment of Japanese Americans
- Uchida, Yoshiko (1995). The Invisible Thread. Sag Harbor, N.Y.: Beech Tree Books. — Victim of the Internment of Japanese Americans

=== Civilians, other ===
==== Australia ====
- Meadows, Maureen C. (1948). I loved those Yanks. Sydney: Dash. — Australian woman's recollection about the presence of U.S. troops in Australia during the war

==== France ====
- Beauvoir, Simone de (1963). La Force des Choses [The Force of Things] (in French). Paris: Gallimard.

==== Germany ====
- Hillers, Marta (2005). A Woman in Berlin. London: Virago.

==== Japan ====
- Nagai, Takashi (1949). The Bells of Nagasaki. Tokyo: Kodansha.

==== Singapore ====
- Lee Kuan Yew (1998). The Singapore Story: Memoirs of Lee Kuan Yew. Marshall Cavendish Editions. ISBN 978-981-4561-76-1.

=== Journalists; war correspondents ===
==== Australia ====
- Bean, Charles E. W. (1943). War aims of a plain Australian. Sydney: Angus & Robertson.
- Burchett, Wilfred (1983). Shadows of Hiroshima. Zed Press. ISBN 0862320852.

==== United Kingdom ====
- Patmore, Derek (1941). Balkan Correspondent. New York: Harper.
- Werth, Alexander (1964). Russia at War, 1941–1945. Barrie & Rockliff.

==== United States ====
- Smedley, Agnes (1938). China Fights Back. The Vanguard Press.
- Smedley, Agnes (1943). Battle Hymn of China. Alfred A. Knopf.
- Snow, Edgar (1941). The Battle for Asia. Random House.
- Snow, Edgar (1944). People on Our Side. Random House.
- Strong, Anna Louise (1942). The Soviets Expected It. The Dial Press.
- Strong, Anna Louise (1946). I Saw the New Poland. Little, Brown, and Company.

=== Military, generals & admirals ===
==== Albania ====
- Hoxha, Enver (1981). Kur lindi Partia [When the Party Was Born] (in Albanian). Tirana: Shtëpia botuese «8 Nëntori».
- Hoxha, Enver (1982). The Anglo-American Threat to Albania: Memoirs of the National Liberation War. Tirana: 8 Nëntori Publishing House.
- Peçi, Shefqet (1986). Commander, We Are Consumed With Longing. Tirana: 8 Nëntori Publishing House.
- Peza, Myslim (1987). Kur dhashë besën [When I Gave My Oath] (in Albanian). Tirana: Shtëpia botuese «8 Nëntori».
- Shehu, Mehmet (1959). Kujtime nga jeta e Brigadës I-rë Sulmuese [Memories from the Life of the First Assault Brigade] (in Albanian). Tirana: Shtyp „Bashkimi”.
- Shehu, Mehmet (1959). Lufta për çlirimin e Tiranës [The Battle for the Liberation of Tirana] (in Albanian). Tirana: Shtëpia Botuese «Naim Frashëri».

==== China ====
- Peng Dehuai (1984). Memoirs of a Chinese Marshal. Beijing: Foreign Languages Press.
- Nieh Jung-Chen (1988). Inside the Red Star: The Memoirs of Marshal Nie Rongzhen. New World Press.

==== Czechoslovakia ====
- Klapálek, Karel (1966). Ozvěny bojů [Echoes of Battles] (in Czech). Naše vojsko.
- Svoboda, Ludvík (1970). Z Buzuluku do Prahy [From Buzuluk to Prague] (in Czech). Naše vojsko.

==== Finland ====
- Mannerheim, Carl Gustaf (1954). Memoirs. E. P. Dutton & Company.

==== France ====
- de Gaulle, Charles (1968). The Complete War Memoirs of Charles de Gaulle. Vol. 1–3. Translated by Griffin, Jonathan; Howard, Richard. New York: Simon & Schuster.

==== Germany ====
- Balck, Hermann (1981). Order in Chaos: The Memoirs of General of Panzer Troops Hermann Balck. The University Press of Kentucky. ISBN 978-0-8131-6126-6.
- Bayerlein, Fritz H. (1952). German Experiences in Desert Warfare during World War II. US Army Military History Institute.
- Below, Nicolaus v. (1980). Als Hitler's Adjutant, 1937–1945 [At Hitler's Side: The Memoirs of Hitler's Luftwaffe Adjutant, 1937–1945] (in German). Mainz: Hase & Koehler.
- Dönitz, Karl (1958). Zehn Jahre und zwanzig Tage: Erinnerungen 1935–1945 (in German). Pegasus Digital Publishing. ISBN 978-3-7637-5186-0.
- Eichmann, Adolf (1962). Memoiren [Memoirs] (in German).
- Gerhard, Engel (1974). Heeresadjutant bei Hitler 1938–1945 [Hitler's Army Adjutant, 1938–1945] (in German). Deutsche Verlags-Anstalt. ISBN 3-421-01699-2.
- Guderian, Heinz (1952). Panzer Leader. Translated by Fitzgibbon, Constantine. New York: E. P. Dutton.
- Heusinger, Adolf (1950). Befehl im Widerstreit: Schicksalsstunden der deutschen Armee [Conflicts over Orders: Hours of fate of the German Army] (in German). Rainer Wunderlich Verlag.
- Keitel, Wilhelm (2000) [1965]. Gorlitz, Walter (ed.). The Memoirs of Field-Marshal Wilhelm Keitel: Chief of the German High Command 1938–1945. Cooper Square Press. ISBN 978-1-4616-6115-3.
- Kesselring, Albert (1953). Soldat bis zum letzten Tag [Soldier until the Last Day] (in German). Athenäum.
- Manstein, Erich v. (1955). Verlorene Siege [Lost Victories] (in German).
- Mellenthin, Friedrich W. v. (1963). Panzerschlachten. Eine Studie über den Einsatz von Panzerverbänden im 2. Weltkrieg [Panzer Battles: A Study of the Employment of Armor in the Second World War] (in German). Ballantine Books. ISBN 978-5-244-40019-9.
- Müller, Vincenz (1963). Ich fand das wahre Vaterland [I Found the True Fatherland] (in German). Deutscher Militärverlag.
- Raus, Erhard (2003). Panzer Operations: The Eastern Front Memoir of General Raus, 1941–1945. Cambridge, Massachusetts: Da Capo Press.
- Rommel, Erwin (1953). Liddell-Hart, Basil (ed.). The Rommel Papers. Harcourt Brace & Company.
- Schlabrendorff, Fabian v. (1946). Offiziere gegen Hitler [Officers against Hitler]. Siedler Verlag. ISBN 978-3-442-12861-7.
- Schmidt, Heinz Werner (1951). With Rommel in the Desert. George G. Harrap & Co.
- Senger und Etterlin, Fridolin v. (1963). Neither Fear nor Hope: The Wartime Career of General Frido von Senger und Etterlin, Defender of Cassino. Translated by Malcolm, George. London: Macdonald.
- Stahlberg, Alexander (1987). Die Verdammte Pflicht: Erinnerungen 1932 bis 1945 [Damned Duty: Memories 1932–1945] (in German). Ullstein. ISBN 3-548-33129-7.
- Warlimont, Walter (1962). Inside Hitler's Headquarters 1939–45. Presidio. ISBN 0-89141-514-9.
- Weizsäcker, Richard v. (1997). Vier Zeiten: Erinnerungen [Four Times: Memoirs] (in German). Pantheon. ISBN 978-3-641-04429-9.

==== Italy ====
- Badoglio, Pietro (1947). Italy In The Second World War: Memories And Documents. Oxford University Press. ISBN 978-0-8371-8485-2.

==== Korea ====
- Choe Hyon; et al. (1972). For the Freedom and Liberation of the Korean People. London: Africa Ltd.
- Chon Mun Sop; O Jin U (1977). Taking a Machine Gun Himself. Pyongyang: Foreign Languages Publishing House. OCLC 6423895.
- Chon Chang Chol; O Jin U; et al. (1974). Establishing the People's Revolutionary Government: A Genuine People's Power. Pyongyang: Foreign Languages Publishing House. OCLC 441622192.
- Kim Il Sung (1994–1998). With the Century, Vol. 1-8. Pyongyang: Foreign Languages Publishing House.

==== Poland ====
- Berling, Zygmunt (1990). Wspomnienia, t. I, Z łagrów do Andersa [Memoirs Vol. I, From the Camps to Anders] (in Polish). Polski Dom Wydawniczy.
- Berling, Zygmunt (1990). Wspomnienia, t. II, Przeciw 17 Republice [Memoirs Vol. II, Against the 17th Republic] (in Polish). Polski Dom Wydawniczy.
- Berling, Zygmunt (1990). Wspomnienia, t. III, Wolność na przetarg [Memoirs Vol. III, Freedom at Bidding] (in Polish). Polski Dom Wydawniczy.
- Moczar, Mieczysław (1966). Barwy Walki [The Colors of Battle] (in Polish). Wydawnictwo MON.
- Popławski, Stanisław (1964). Towarzysze frontowych dróg [Comrades of the Front Roads] (in Polish). Wojskowy Instytut Historyczny.
- Sosabowski, Stanislaw (2014) [1960]. Freely I Served: The Memoir of the Commander, 1st Polish Independent Parachute Brigade 1941–1944. Pen & Sword Books. ISBN 978-1-78346-261-2.
- Spychalski, Marian (1983). Początek walki: fragmenty wspomnień [The Beginning of the Struggle: Excerpts of Memoirs] (in Polish). Wydawnictwo MON.

==== Romania ====
- Mociulschi, Leonard (1967). Asaltul vînătorilor de munte [Assault of the Mountain Hunters] (in Romanian). Editura Militară.

==== Soviet Union ====
- Brezhnev, Leonid (1980). Trilogy: Little Land, Rebirth, The Virgin Lands. International Publishers.
- Chuikov, Vasili Ivanovich (1964). The Battle for Stalingrad: The Story of World War II's Greatest Battle as told by the Russian Commander at Stalingrad. Ballantine Books.
- Chuikov, Vasili I. (1969). The Fall of Berlin: With the Russian Army in Berlin - The Last Battle of Nazi Germany. Ballantine books.
- Chuikov, Vasilii I. (2003). Mission to China: Memoirs of a Soviet Military Adviser to Chiang Kai-shek. Eastbridge Books.
- Golikov, F.I. (1987). On a Military Mission to Great Britain and the USA. Progress Publishers.
- Golovko, Arseni (1965). With the Red Fleet. Putnam.
- Gorbatov, A.V. (1965). Years Off My Life. W. W. Norton.
- Grechko, Andrei (1971). Battle for the Caucasus. Progress Publishers.
- Konev, I. (1969). Year of Victory. Progress Publishers.
- Kuznetsov, N.G. (1990). Memoirs of Wartime Minister of the Navy. Progress Publishers.
- Meretskov, K. (1970). City Invincible. Progress Publishers.
- Meretskov, K.A. (1971). Serving the People. Progress Publishers.
- Rokossovsky, K. (1985). A Soldier's Duty. Progress Publishers.
- Shtemenko, S.M. (1985). The Soviet General Staff at War 1941-1945, Book One. Progress Publishers.
- Shtemenko, S.M. (1985). The Soviet General Staff at War 1941-1945, Book Two. Progress Publishers.
- Sudoplatov, Pavel (1994). Special Tasks: The Memoirs of an Unwanted Witness - A Soviet Spymaster. Little Brown & Co.
- Vasilevsky, A.M. (1973). A Lifelong Cause. Progress Publishers.
- Vershigora, P. (1949). Men with a Clear Conscience. Foreign Languages Publishing House.
- Zhukov, G. (1985). Reminiscences and Reflections, Volume 1. Progress Publishers.
- Zhukov, G. (1985). Reminiscences and Reflections, Volume 2. Progress Publishers.

==== United Kingdom ====
- Alexander, Harold R. L. G. (1962). The Alexander Memoirs, 1940–1945. London: Cassell.
- Auchinleck, Claude (1946). Despatch on Operations in the Middle East From 5th July, 1941 to 31st October 1941. London: War Office. ("No. 37695". The London Gazette (Supplement). 20 August 1946. pp. 4215–4230.)
- Harris, Arthur (1947). Bomber Offensive. London: Collins.
- Wavell, Archibald (1946). Despatch on Operations in the Middle East From 7th February, 1941 to 15th July 1941. London: War Office. ("No. 37638". The London Gazette (Supplement). 3 July 1946. pp. 3423–3444.)
- ——— (1946). Despatch on Operations in Iraq, East Syria and Iran from 10th April, 1941 to 12th January, 1942. London: War Office. ("No. 37685". The London Gazette (Supplement). 13 August 1946. pp. 4093–4102.)

==== United States ====
- Bradley, Omar N. (1951). A Soldier's Story. New York: Henry Holt & Co.
- Bradley, Omar N. (1983). Blair, Clay (ed.). A General's Life: An Autobiography by General of the Army Omar N. Bradley. Simon & Schuster. ISBN 0-671-41023-7.
- Calvert, James F. (1995). Silent Running: My Years on a World War II Attack Submarine. New York: John Wiley & Sons.
- Eisenhower, Dwight D. (1948). Crusade in Europe: A Personal Account of World War II. New York: Doubleday. ISBN 978-0-385-41619-1.
- Halsey, William F. Jr.; Bryan, J. III (1947). Admiral Halsey's Story. New York: McGraw-Hill.
- MacArthur, Douglas (1964). Reminiscences. New York: McGraw-Hill.
- Patton, George S. (1947). War as I Knew It. Boston: Houghton Mifflin.
- Patton, George S. (1972–1974). Blumenson, Martin (ed.). The Patton Papers. Boston: Houghton Mifflin. ISBN 978-0-395-12706-3.
- Robinett, Paul M. (1958). Armor Command: The Personal Story of a Commander of the 13th Armored Regiment of CCB, 1st Armored Division and of the Armored School during World War II. Washington DC.
- Wainwright, Jonathan M. (1970). General Wainwright's story: the account of four years of humiliating defeat, surrender, and captivity. Westport (Conn./USA): Greenwood.

==== Vietnam ====
- Võ Nguyên Giáp (1975). Unforgettable Days. Hanoi: Foreign Languages Publishing House.

==== Yugoslavia ====
- Dapčević, Peko (1981). Od Pirineja do Cetinja [From the Pyrenees to Cetinje] (in Serbo-Croatian). Prosveta.
- Ljubičić, Nikola (1981). Užički odred Dimitrije Tucović [The Dimitrije Tucović Detachment of Užice] (in Serbo-Croatian). Narodna knjiga.
- Ljubičić, Nikola (2006). U Titovoj koloni [Marching with Tito] (in Serbian).
- Jovanović, Arso (2025). Overview of the National Liberation War. Sava Press.
- Mamula, Branko (2020). Admiral s Korduna [The Admiral from Kordun] (in Serbian). Zagreb: Srpsko narodno vijeće.
- Orović, Savo (1972). Ratni dnevnik 1941-1945 [War Diary 1941-1945] (in Serbo-Croatian). Khronometar.

=== Military, other ===
==== Australia ====
- Bennet Bremner, E. (1944). Front-Line Airway: The War Story of Qantas Empire Airways Ltd. Sydney: Angus & Robertson.
- Chapman, Ivan (1958). Details Enclosed. Sydney: Angus & Robertson. — Australian prisoner-of-war in German camps.
- Clark, Russell S. (1946). An End to Tears. Sydney: Huston. — Australian prisoner-of-war in Japanese camps.
- Goodhart, David (1947). We of the Turning Tide. London: Preece. — 9th Australian Division soldier in North Africa.
- Selby, David (1957). Hell and High Fever. London: Angus & Robertson. — Australian anti-aircraft battery commander during the 1942 Battle of Rabaul of the 2/22nd Battalion.

==== Canada ====
- Heaps, Leo (1945). Escape from Arnhem: A Canadian among the lost Paratroops. London: Macmillan.
- Mowat, Farley (1973). The Regiment. Toronto: McClelland. — first-hand account by a Canadian veteran of the Hastings and Prince Edward Regiment

==== France ====
- Calmel, Jean (1955). Night Pilot. London: Kimber. — French airman who later served in the Royal Air Force.

==== Germany ====
- Altner, Helmut (2002). Berlin: Dance of Death. Translated by Le Tissier, Tony. Havertown, Penn.: Casemate.
- Dibold, Hans (2001). Doctor at Stalingrad. Littleton, Colorado: Aberdeen Publishing.
- Einsiedel, Heinrich Graf von; Wieder, Joachim (1998). Stalingrad: Memories and Reassessments. New York: Sterling Publishing.
- Hoffmann, Heinrich (1940). With Hitler in the West. Pen & Sword.
- Hoffmann, Heinz (1981). Mannheim — Madrid — Moskau (in German). Militärverlag der Deutschen Demokratischen Republik.
- Hoffmann, Heinz (1989). Moskau — Berlin (in German). Militärverlag der Deutschen Demokratischen Republik.
- Neukirchen, Heinz (1986). Mit ungewissem Kurs [With an Uncertain Course] (in German). transpress.
- Sajer, Guy (1965). The Forgotten Soldier. Potomac Books, Inc.
- Höss, Rudolf (2000) [1945–1946]. Fitzgibbon, Constantine; et al. (eds.). Commandant of Auschwitz: The Autobiography of Rudolf Hoess. Phoenix. ISBN 978-1-84212-024-8.
- Lubbeck, William; Hurt, David B. (2010), At Leningrad's Gates: The Story of a Soldier with Army Group North, Casemate, ISBN 978-1-935149-37-8
- Prien, Günther (1954) [1940]. I sank the 'Royal Oak'. London: Gray's Inn.

==== Poland ====
- Kuropieska, Józef (1972). Wspomnienia oficera sztabu 1934–1939 [Memoirs of a Staff Officer 1934-1939] (in Polish). Wydawnictwo MON.
- Kuropieska, Józef (1974). Obozowe refleksje: oflag II C [Camp Reflections: Oflag II-C] (in Polish). Krajowa Agencja Wydawnicza.

==== Soviet Union ====
- Bessonov, Evgeni (2017). Tank Rider: Into the Reich with the Red Army. Skyhorse.
- Bryukhov, Vasiliy (2020). Red Army Tank Commander: At War in a T-34 on the Eastern Front. Pen and Sword.
- Dragunsky, D.A. (1983). A Soldier's Memoirs. Progress Publishers.
- Drobyazko, Sergey (2022). On the Eastern Front at Seventeen: The Memoirs of a Red Army Soldier. Greenhill Books.
- Pogozhev, Andrey (2007). Escape from Auschwitz. Casemate.
- Reshetnikov, Vasily (2008). Serguey Anisimov (ed.). Bomber Pilot on the Eastern Front: 307 Missions Behind Enemy Lines. Pen and Sword.
- Zaitsev, Vassili (2010). Notes of a Russian Sniper. Frontline Books.
- Zhukova, Yuliya Konstantinovna (2019). Girl With A Sniper Rifle: An Eastern Front Memoir. Greenhill Books.

==== United Kingdom ====
- Allen, Hubert Raymond (1973). Battle for Britain: The Recollectuions of H. R. 'Dizzy' Allen, DFC. London: Barker.
- Briant, Keith (1958). Fighting with the Guards. London: Evans.
- Bushby, John (1972). Gunner's moon: a memoir of the RAF night assault on Germany. London: Allan.
- Casper, Bernard M. (1947). With the Jewish Brigade. London: Goldston.
- Cheshire, Leonard (1943). Bomber Pilot. London: Hutchinson.
- Coast, John (1952). Recruit to Revolution: Adventure and Politics in Indochina. London: Christophers.
- Crawford, Robert J. (1944). I was an Eighth Army soldier. London: Gollancz.
- Davies, A. T. (1948). Friend's Ambulance Unit: The Story of the F.A.J. in the Second World War, 1939–1946. London: Allen & Unwin.
- Gwynne-Vaughan, Helen C. I. (1942). Service with the Army. London: Hutchinson.
- Hagen, Louis (1945). Arnhem Lift: The Diary of a Glider Pilot. London: Pilot.
- Karaka, Dosoo F. (1945). With the 14th Army. London: Crisp.
- Leslie, Anita (1948). A Train to Nowhere: An Ambulance Driver's Adventures on Four Fronts. London: Hutchinson.
- MacDonald, John Forrest (1957). Abyssinian Adventure. Cassell.
- Myers, Bessy (1941). Captured: My Experiences as an Ambulance Driver and as a Prisoner of the Nazis. London: Harrap.
- Pereira, Jocelyn (1948). A Distant Drum: War Memories of the Intelligence Officer of the 5th Battalion Coldstream Guards, 1944–45. Aldershot: Gale & Polden.
- Rainier, Peter W. (1944). Pipeline to battle: an engineer's adventures with the Eighth Army. London: Heinemann.
- Tucker, Francis I. S. (1963). Approach to battle: a commentary; Eighth Army, November 1941 to May 1943. London: Cassell.

==== United States ====
- Abraham, Abie (1971). Ghost of Bataan speaks. New York: Vantage.
- Andrews, Ernest A.; Hurt, David B. (2022). A Machine Gunner's War: From Normandy to Victory with the 1st Infantry Division in World War II. Philadelphia & Oxford: Casemate. ISBN 978-1-63624-104-3.
- Bond, Harold L. (1964). Return to Cassino: A Memoir of the Fight for Rome. London: Dent.
- Burgett, Donald (1967). Currahee! 'We Stand Alone!': A Paratrooper's Account of the Normandy Invasion. London: Hutchinson.
- Carter, Ross S. (1951). Those Devils in Baggy Pants. New York: Appleton.
- Cartwright, Reginald (1941). Mercy and Murder: An American Ambulance Driver's Experiences in Finland, Norway and France. London: Iliffe.
- Dyess, William E. (1944). Dyess Story: The Eye-Witness Account of the Death March from Bataan [UK title: "Death March from Bataan"]. New York: Putnam.
- Fussell, Paul (1989). Wartime: Understanding and Behavior in the Second World War. New York: Oxford University Press.
- Geer, Andrew (1943). Mercy in Hell: An American Ambulance Driver with the Eighth Army. New York: McGraw-Hill.
- Redmond Hipps, Juanita (1943). I served on Bataan. Philadelphia: Lippincott.
- Levering, Robert W. (1948). Horror Trek: A True Story of Bataan, the Death March and three years in Japanese Prison Camps. Mount Vernon (Ohio, USA): Levering.
- Miller, Ernest B. (1949). Bataan Uncensored. Long Prairie (Minn./USA): Hart.
- Thomas, Evan W. (1943). An Ambulance in Africa. New York: Appleton.

==== Yugoslavia ====
- Ćuruvija, Slavko (2025). Cominformist — I, Vlado Dapčević. Sava Press.

=== Political leaders; politicians; heads of state; diplomats ===
==== Albania ====
- Hoxha, Nexhmije (1998). Jeta ime me Enverin. Kujtime 1 [My Life With Enver. Memoirs, Vol.1] (in Albanian). LIRA.

==== France ====
- Bidault, Georges (1965). D'une résistance a l'autre [Resistance: The Political Autobiography of Georges Bidault] (in French). Paris: Les Presses du Siécle.
- de Gaulle, Charles (1968). The Complete War Memoirs of Charles de Gaulle. Vol. 1–3. Translated by Griffin, Jonathan; Howard, Richard. New York: Simon & Schuster.

==== Germany ====
- Honecker, Erich (1981). From My Life. Pergamon Press.
- Papen, Franz v. (1952). Memoirs. Andre Deutsch.
- Schroeder, Christa (1985). He Was My Chief: The Memoirs of Adolf Hitler's Secretary. Frontline Books.
- Speer, Albert (1997). Inside the Third Reich. New York: Simon & Schuster.
- Weizsäcker, Ernst v. (1951). Memoirs of Ernst von Weizsäcker. Victor Gollancz Ltd.

==== Hungary ====
- Horthy, Miklos (1953). Simon, Andrew L. (ed.). Admiral Nicholas Horthy: Memoirs. Simon Publications. ISBN 978-0-9665734-3-5.

==== Italy ====
- Badoglio, Pietro (1947). Italy In The Second World War: Memories And Documents. Oxford University Press. ISBN 978-0-8371-8485-2.

==== Soviet Union ====
- Berezkhov, Valentin (1994). At Stalin's Side: His Interpreter's Memoirs From the October Revolution to the Fall of the Dictator's Empire. Seacaucus, N.J.: Carol Pub. Group.
- Berezkhov, Valentin (1983). History in the Making: Memoirs of World War II Diplomacy. Moscow: Progress Publishers.
- Chuev, Felix (2007). Molotov Remembers: Inside Kremlin Politics. Ivan R. Dee. ISBN 978-1-56663-715-2.
- Khrushchev, Nikita S. (1970). Talbott, Strobe (ed.). Khrushchev Remembers. Boston: Little, Brown & Co.
- Shepilov, Dmitrii (2014). The Kremlin's Scholar: A Memoir of Soviet Politics Under Stalin and Khrushchev. Yale University Press.

==== United Kingdom ====
- Churchill, Winston (1948–1952). The Second World War. Vol. 1–6. Boston: Houghton Mifflin.
- Spears, Sir Edward (1954). Assignment to Catastrophe. London: Heinemann.

==== United States ====
- Acheson, Dean (1969). Present at the Creation: My Years in the State Department. New York: W.W. Norton.
- Hull, Cordell (1948). Memoirs of Cordell Hull. Vol. 1–2. London: Hodder & Stoughton.

==== Vietnam ====
- Hồ Chí Minh (1972). Prison Diary. Hanoi: Foreign Languages Publishing House.

=== Secret agents; spies ===
- Cohn, Marthe (2002). Holden, Wendy (ed.). Behind Enemy Lines. New York: Harmony Books. ISBN 0-609-61054-6. OCLC 0609610546.

== See also ==
- Bibliography of the Holocaust
- Bibliography of the Holocaust in Greece
- Bibliography of World War II
- Bibliography of World War II battles and campaigns in Europe, North Africa and the Middle East
- Bibliography of World War II battles and campaigns in East Asia, South East Asia and the Pacific
- Bibliography of World War II military units and formations
- Bibliography of World War II warships
