= Bibliography of World War II military units and formations =

This is a Bibliography of World War military units and formations. It aims to include historical sources and literature (and to avoid works of fiction) about specific unit formations of World War II, such as fronts/army groups, field armies, army corps, divisions, brigades, regiments, battalions, and companies. It also includes air force formations, such as air divisions, air groups, air wings, air squadrons and air force flights. Furthermore, it includes naval formations, such as naval divisions, naval squadrons, flotillas, carrier battle groups, naval task forces and naval fleets.

This article forms a part of the larger Bibliography of World War II. Bibliographies of individual warships and warship classes are omitted; they are listed separately in the Bibliography of World War II warships.

== Bibliography ==
=== Army groups ===
Includes OF-10 (field marshal) formations.

==== Germany ====
Army Group A

- Schönherr, Klaus (2007). "The Withdrawal of Army Group A through the Crimea to Romania". In Frieser, Karl-Heinz; et al. (eds.). Eastern Front 1943–1944: The War in the East and on the Neighbouring Fronts. Germany and the Second World War. Vol. 8. Translated by Smerin, Barry. Clarendon Press. pp. 446–488. ISBN 978-0-19-872346-2.

Army Group Don

- Sadarananda, Dana V. (1990). Beyond Stalingrad: Manstein and the Operations of Army Group Don. New York: Praeger. ISBN 0-275-93440-3.

Army Group Center

- Frieser, Karl-Heinz (2007). "The Withdrawal of Army Group Centre to Belorussia up to the Spring of 1944". In Frieser, Karl-Heinz; et al. (eds.). Eastern Front 1943–1944: The War in the East and on the Neighbouring Fronts. Germany and the Second World War. Vol. 8. Translated by Smerin, Barry. Clarendon Press. pp. 293–337. ISBN 978-0-19-872346-2.
- ————————— (2007). "The Collapse of Army Group Centre in the Summer of 1944". In Frieser, Karl-Heinz; et al. (eds.). Eastern Front 1943–1944: The War in the East and on the Neighbouring Fronts. Germany and the Second World War. Vol. 8. Translated by Smerin, Barry. Clarendon Press. pp. 522–601. ISBN 978-0-19-872346-2.
- ————————— (2007). "The Defensive Successes of Army Group Centre in the Autumn of 1944". In Frieser, Karl-Heinz; et al. (eds.). Eastern Front 1943–1944: The War in the East and on the Neighbouring Fronts. Germany and the Second World War. Vol. 8. Translated by Smerin, Barry. Clarendon Press. pp. 602–620. ISBN 978-0-19-872346-2.
- Haupt, Werner (1968). Heeresgruppe Mitte: 1941–1945 [Army Group Center: 1941–1945] (in German). Bad Nauheim: Podzun.
- Hinze, Rolf (1980). Der Zusammenbruch der Heeresgruppe Mitte im Osten 1944 [The Collapse of Army Group Center in the East, 1944] (in German). Motorbuch Verlag. ISBN 3-87943-681-9.
- Kirchubel, Robert (2007). Operation Barbarossa 1941 (3): Army Group Center. Osprey Publishing. ISBN 978-1-84603-107-6.
- Kurowski, Franz (1989). Die Heeresgruppe Mitte 1942, 1943 : Cholm, Dimitrowo, Dubno, Nowosokolniki, Welish, Welikije, Luki, Demidow, Surash, Witebsk, Toropez, Tschernosjem, Opuchliki, Baschmakowo, Newel, Rudnja, Kresty (in German). Friedberg (Hesse): Podzun-Pallas. ISBN 3-7909-0376-0.

Army Group Courland

- Haupt, Werner (1976). Kurland, die vergessene Heeresgruppe: 1944/1945 [Courland, the forgotten Army Group: 1944/1945] (in German). Podzun-Pallas.

Army Group North

- Frieser, Karl-Heinz (2007). "The Withdrawal of Army Group North from Leningrad to the Baltic". In Frieser, Karl-Heinz; et al. (eds.). Eastern Front 1943–1944: The War in the East and on the Neighbouring Fronts. Germany and the Second World War. Vol. 8. Translated by Smerin, Barry. Clarendon Press. pp. 274–292. ISBN 978-0-19-872346-2.
- Haupt, Werner (1966). Heeresgruppe Nord: 1941–1945 [Army Group Center: 1941–1945] (in German). Bad Nauheim: Podzun.
- Kilian, Jürgen (2012). Wehrmacht und Besatzungsherrschaft im Russischen Nordwesten 1941–1944: Praxis und Alltag im Militärverwaltungsgebiet der Heeresgruppe Nord [Wehrmacht and occupation rule in the Russian northwest, 1941–1944: Praxis and everyday life in the military administration area of Army Group North] (in German).
- Kirchubel, Robert (2005). Operation Barbarossa 1941 (2): Army Group North. Osprey Publishing. ISBN 978-1-84176-857-1.

Army Group South

- Frieser, Karl-Heinz (2007). "Army Group South's Withdrawal Operations in the Ukraine". In Frieser, Karl-Heinz; et al. (eds.). Eastern Front 1943–1944: The War in the East and on the Neighbouring Fronts. Germany and the Second World War. Vol. 8. Translated by Smerin, Barry. Clarendon Press. pp. 338–445. ISBN 978-0-19-872346-2.
- Haupt, Werner (1985). Die Schlachten der Heeresgruppe Süd: Aus der Sicht der Divisionen [The Battles of Army Group South: From the Divisions' Perspective] (in German). Bad Nauheim: Podzun-Pallas.
- Kirchubel, Robert (2003). Operation Barbarossa 1941 (1): Army Group South. Osprey Publishing. ISBN 978-1-84176-697-3.
- Wagener, Carl (1967). Heeresgruppe Süd: Der Kampf im Süden der Ostfront 1941–1945 [Army Group South: The Fight in the South of the Eastern Front, 1941–1945] (in German). Bad Nauheim: Podzun.

==== United Kingdom ====
21st Army Group

- Darby, Hugh; Cunliffe, Marcus (1949). A short story of 21st Army Group. Aldershot: Gale & Polden.
- North, John (1953). North-West Europe 1944–5: the achievement of the 21st Army Group. London: HMSO.

=== Field armies ===
Includes OF-9 (four-star general) formations.

==== Germany ====
- Carell, Paul (1993). Stalingrad: Sieg und Untergang der 6. Armee [Stalingrad: Victory and Demise of the 6th Army] (in German) (2nd ed.). Berlin: Ullstein. ISBN 3-550-07515-4.

=== Army corps ===
Includes OF-8 (three-star general) formations.

==== Germany ====
- Bußmann, Walter (1993). "Kursk-Orel-Dnjepr. Erlebnisse und Erfahrungen im Stab des XXXXVI. Panzerkorps während des Unternehmens Zitadelle" [Kursk-Orel-Dnieper. Experiences in the Staff of XXXXVI Panzer Corps during Operation Citadel]. Vierteljahrshefte für Zeitgeschichte (in German). Oldenbourg. — XXXXVI Panzer Corps
- Chamberlain, Peter; Ellis, Chris (1971). Afrika Korps: German Military Operations in the Western Desert. Edgware (Middlesex, UK): Almark. — Afrika Korps
- Macksey, Kenneth J. (1968). Africa Korps. New York: Ballantine. — Afrika Korps

==== United Kingdom ====
- Clabby, J. (1963). The History of the Royal Army Veterinary Corps, 1919–1961. London: J. A. Allen. — Royal Army Veterinary Corps
- Cotterell, Anthony (1943). R.A.M.C. London: Hutchinson. — Royal Army Medical Corps
- Crozier, Stephen F. (1951). The History of the Corps of Royal Military Police. Aldershot: Gale & Polden. — Royal Military Police
- Fernyhough, Alan H. (1967). History of the Royal Army Ordnance Corps, 1920–1945. London: Director of Ordnance Services. — Royal Army Ordnance Corps
- Kennett, Brian B. (1970). Craftsman of the Army: the Story of the Royal Electrical and Mechanical Engineers. London: Cooper. — Royal Electrical and Mechanical Engineers
- Masters, David (1943). With Pennants Flying: The Immortal Deeds of the Royal Armoured Corps. London: Eyre & Spottiswoode. — Royal Armoured Corps
- Murland, R. J. W. (1943). The Royal Armoured Corps. London: Methuen. — Royal Armoured Corps
- Nalder, Reginald F. H. (1953). The History of the British Army Signals in the Second World War. Aldershot: Royal Signals Institution. — Royal Corps of Signals
- Packenham-Walsh, R. P. (1958). History of the Corps of Royal Engineers. Vol. 8–9. Chatham (Kent): Institution of Royal Engineers. — Royal Pioneer Corps
- Rhodes-Wood, E. H. (1960). A War History of the Royal Pioneer Corps, 1939–1945. Aldershot: Gale & Polden. — Royal Pioneer Corps
- Taylor, Jeremy L. (1947). This band of brothers: a history of the Reconnaissance Corps of the British Army. Bristol: White Swan. — Reconnaissance Corps

==== United States ====
- United States Army (1945). XII Corps Artillery in Combat, 13 Aug 1944 to 8 May 1945. Regensburg (Germany). — XII Corps (Artillery)

=== Divisions ===
Includes OF-7 (two-star general) formations.

==== Germany ====
- Bölscher, Bern (2014). An den Ufern der Oder: Genesis eines Kriegsendes. Die 1. Marine-Infanterie-Division und das letzte Aufgebot des Großadmirals Dönitz am Ende des Zweiten Weltkriegs [On the Oder shores: Genesis of War's End. The 1st Naval Infantry Division and the last reserves of Grand Admiral Dönitz near the end of World War II] (in German). Norderstedt: Books on Demand. ISBN 978-3-7357-4146-2. — 1st Marine Division
- Ellis, Chris (2001). 21st Panzer Division: Rommel's Afrika Korps Spearhead. Ian Allan Publishing. ISBN 978-0-7110-2853-1. — 21st Panzer Division
- Großmann, Horst (1958). Geschichte der rheinisch-westfälischen 6. Infanterie-Division 1939–1945 [History of the Rhenish-Westphalian 6th Infantry Division, 1939–1945] (in German). Bad Nauheim: Podzun. — 6th Infantry Division
- Keubke, Klaus-Ulrich (2013). Zur Geschichte der 12. (meckl.) Infanterie-Division [Regarding the History of the 12th (Mecklenburger) Infantry Division] (in German). Schwerin: Keubke. — 12th Infantry Division
- Klatt, Paul (1958). Die 3. Gebirgs-Division [The 3rd Mountain Division] (in German). Bad Nauheim: Podzun. — 3rd Mountain Division
- Pape, Klaus (2007). 329. Infanterie-Division: Cholm—Demjansk—Kurland [329th Infantry Division: Kholm—Demyansk—Courland] (in German). Scherzers Militär-Verlag. ISBN 978-3-938845-10-3. — 329th Infantry Division
- Pohlman, Hartwig (1959). Geschichte der 96. Infanterie-Division 1939–1945 [History of the 96th Infantry Division, 1939–1945] (in German). Podzun. — 96th Infantry Division
- Schäfer, Ralf-Anton; et al. (2008) [1970]. Die Mondschein-Division [The Moonshine Division] (in German). Books on Demand. — 62nd Infantry Division
- Scheibert, Horst (1958). Bildband der 6. Panzer-Division 1939–1945 [Picture Book of the 6th Panzer Division, 1939–1945] (in German). Bad Nauheim: Podzun. — 6th Panzer Division
- Weinberger, Andreas (1943). Das gelbe Edelweiß: Wege und Werden einer Gebirgsdivision [The yellow Edelweiß: Path and Creation of a Mountain Division] (in German). Munich: Eher. — 6th Mountain Division

==== United Kingdom ====
- 79th British Armoured Division (1945). The Story of the 79th Armoured Division, October 1942 – June 1945. Hamburg. — 79th Armoured Division
- Barclay, Cyril N. (1956). The History of the 53rd (Welsh) Division in the Second World War. London: Clowes. — 53rd (Welsh) Infantry Division
- Blake, George (1950). Mountain and Flood: the History of the 52nd (Lowland) Division, 1939–1946. Glasgow: Jackson. — 52nd (Lowland) Infantry Division
- Borthwick, James (1945). 51st Highland Division in North Africa and Sicily. Glasgow: Mackenzie. — 51st (Highland) Division
- British Ministry of Information (1945). By Air to Battle: Official Account of the British Airborne Division. London: HMSO. — 1st Airborne Division
- Clay, Ewart W. (1945). The Path of the 50th: The Story of the 50th (Northumbrian) Division in the Second World War, 1939–1945. Aldershot: Mackenzie. — 50th (Northumbrian) Infantry Division
- Duncan, Nigel W. (1972). 79th Armoured Division (Hobo's Funnies). Windsor (Berkshire): Profile. — 79th Armoured Division
- Essame, Hubert (1952). The 43rd Wessex Division at War, 1944–1945. London: Clowes. — 43rd (Wessex) Infantry Division
- Knight, Peter (1954). The 59th Division: Its History. London: Muller. — 59th (Staffordshire) Infantry Division
- Martin, Hugh C. (1948). The History of the Fifteenth Scottish Division, 1939–1945. Edinburgh: Blackwood. — 15th (Scottish) Infantry Division
- Packe, Michael (1948). First Airborne. London: Secker & Warburg. — 1st Airborne Division
- Ray, Cyril (1952). Algiers to Austria: a History of the 78 Division in the Second World War. London: Eyre & Spottiswoode. — 78th Infantry Division
- Rosse, Laurence; Hill, E. R. (1956). The Story of the Guards Armoured Division. London: Bles. — Guards Armoured Division
- Salmond, James B. (1953). The History of the 51st Highland Division, 1939–1945. Blackwood: Blackwood. — 51st (Highland) Division
- Stainforth, Peter (1952). Wings of the Wind [1st Airborne Division]. London: Faber. — 1st Airborne Division
- Verney, G. L. (1954). The Desert Rats: The History of the 7th Armoured Division, 1938–1945. London: Hutchinson. — 7th Armoured Division
- ——— (1956). The Guards Armoured Division: A Short History. London: Hutchinson. — Guards Armoured Division
- Williamson, Hugh (1951). The Fourth Division, 1939 to 1945. London: Newman Neame. — 4th Infantry Division

==== United States ====
- Balkokski, Joseph (1999). Beyond the Beachhead: The 29th Infantry Division in Normandy. Mechanicsburg, Penn.: Stackpole Books. — 29th Infantry Division
- Carter, Joseph (1945). The History of the 14th Armored Division. Atlanta: Love. — 14th Armored Division
- Carter, Ross S. (1951). Those Devils in Baggy Pants. New York: Appleton. — 82nd Airborne Division
- Covington, Henry L. (1949). A Fighting Heart: an Unofficial Story of the 82nd Airborne Divisions. Fayetteville (NC/USA): Davis. — 82nd Airborne Division
- Draper, Theodore (1956). The 84th Infantry Division in the Battle of the Ardennes. New York: Viking. — 84th Infantry Division
- Flanagan, Edward M. (1948). The Angels: A History of the 11th Airborne Division 1943–1946. Washington DC: Infantry Journal Press. — 11th Airborne Division
- Howe, George F. (1954). The Battle History of the 1st Armored Division 'Old Ironsides'. Washington DC: Combat Forces. — 1st Armored Division
- Koyen, Kenneth A. (1946). The Fourth Armored Division: From the Beach to Bavaria. Munich: Herder. — 4th Armored Division
- Leach, Charles R. (1956). In Tornado's Wake: A History of the 8th Armored Division. Chicago: Eighth U.S. Armored Division. — 8th Armored Division
- Nichols, Lester M. (1954). Impact: The Battle Story of the Tenth Armored Division. New York: Bradbury/Sayles/O'Neill. — 10th Armored Division
- Pay, Don R. (1947). Thunder From Heaven: Story of the 17th Airborne Division, 1943–1945. Birmingham (MI/USA): The Airborne Quarterly. — 17th Airborne Division
- Rapport, Leonard; Northwood, Arthur (1948). Rendezvous with Destiny: A History of the 101st Airborne Division. Washington DC: Infantry Journal Press. — 101st Airborne Division
- United States Army (1945). Spearhead in the West, 1941–45: The Third Armored Division. Frankfurt/Main-Schwanheim: Henrich. — 3rd Armored Division
- ——— (1945). The Thirteenth Armored Division: A History of the Black Cats from Texas to France, Germany and Austria, and back to California. Baton Rouge (LA/USA): Army & Navy. — 13th Armored Division

=== Brigades ===
Includes OF-6 (one-star general) formations. In the air force, this level applies to RAF groups and to U.S. air wings.

==== Australia ====
- Yeates, James D.; Loh, W. G. (1945). Red Platypus: A Record of the Achievement of the 24th Australian Infantry Brigade, Ninth Australian Division, 1940–45. Perth: Imperial. — 24th Brigade

==== Poland (in exile) ====
- Sosabowski, Stanislaw (2014) [1960]. Freely I Served: The Memoir of the Commander, 1st Polish Independent Parachute Brigade 1941–1944. Pen & Sword Books. ISBN 978-1-78346-261-2. — 1st Polish Independent Parachute Brigade

==== United Kingdom ====
- Forbes, Patrick (1946). 6th Guards Tank Brigade: The Story of Guardsmen in Churchill Tanks. Sampson Low. — 6th Guards Tank Brigade
- Lawrence, W. J. (1951). No. 5 Bomber Group RAF. London: Faber. — No. 5 Group RAF

=== Regiments ===
Includes OF-5 formations. In the armies, those are usually called "regiments". In the air forces, this level applies to RAF air wings and to U.S. air groups, as well as to Canadian air wings, French escadres, German Geschwader, Italian Stormo, etc.

==== Australia ====
- Argent, Jack N. L. (1957). Target Tank: The History of the 2/3rd Australian Anti-Tank Regiment, 9th Division, A.I.F. Parramatta (Australia). — 2/3rd Anti-Tank Regiment
- Cremor, W. E. (1961). Action Front: The History of the 2/2nd Australian Field Regiment, Royal Australian Artillery, A.I.F. Melbourne: 2/2nd Field Regimental Association. — 2/2nd Field Regiment
- Goodhart, David (1952). The History of the 2/7th Australian Field Regiment. Adelaide: Rigby. — 2/7th Field Regiment
- Hartley, Frank J. (1949). Sanananda Interlude: The 7th Australian Division Cavalry Regiment. Melbourne: Victoria Book Depot. — 2/7th Cavalry Commando Regiment (formerly: 7th Australian Division Cavalry Regiment)
- Haywood, E. V. (1959). Six Years in Support: Official History of the 2/1st Australian Field Regiment. Sydney: Angus & Robertson. — 2/1st Field Regiment
- Henry, R. L. (1950). The Story of the 2/4th Field Regiment: A History of a Royal Australian Artillery Regiment during the Second World War. Melbourne: Merrion. — 2/4th Field Regiment
- Kerr, Colin G. (1945). Tanks in the East: The Story of an Australian Cavalry Regiment. Melbourne: Oxford University Press. — 2/9th Cavalry Commando Regiment (formerly: 9th Australian Division Cavalry Regiment)
- O'Brien, John W. (1950). Guns and Gunners: The Story of the 2/5th Australian Field Regiment in World War II. Sydney: Angus & Robertson. — 2/5th Field Regiment

==== Canada ====
- Cassidy, George L. (1948). Warpath: the Story of the Algonquin Regiment, 1939–1945. Toronto: Ryerson. — Algonquin Regiment
- Locke, R. P.; et al. (1954) [1945]. The Governor General's Horse Guards 1939–1945. Toronto: Canadian Military Journal. — Governor General's Horse Guards
- McAvity, J. M. (1947). Lord Strathcona's Horse (Royal Canadians): a record of achievement. Toronto: Ryerson. — Lord Strathcona's Horse (Royal Canadians)
- Mowat, Farley (1973). The Regiment. Toronto: McClelland. — Hastings and Prince Edward Regiment
- Noblston, A. (1945). 5th Canadian Light Anti-Aircraft Regiment: Regimental History, World War II (March 1, 1941 – May 8, 1945). Groningen (Netherlands): De Waal. — 5th Light Anti-Aircraft Regiment
- Pavey, Walter G. (1948). An historical account of the 7th Canadian Reconnaissance Regiment (17th Duke of York's Royal Canadian Hussars) in the World War of 1939–1945. Montreal. — 7th Reconnaissance / 17th Canadian Hussars
- Queen-Hughes, R. W. (1960). Whatever Men Dare: A History of the Queen's Own Cameron Highlanders of Canada, 1935–1960. — Queen's Own Cameron Highlanders
- Spenger, Robert A. (1945). History of the Fifteenth Canadian Field Regiment, Royal Canadian Artillery, 1941 to 1945. New York: Elsevier. — 15th Canadian Field Artillery Regiment

==== Germany ====
- Griesser, Volker (2011). The Lions of Carentan: Fallschirmjäger Regiment 6, 1943–1945. Philadelphia: Casemate Publishers.

==== United Kingdom ====
- 7th Medium Regiment Royal Artillery (1951). The History of the 7th Medium Regiment, Royal Artillery during World War 2, 1939–1945. London: Langrishe. — 7th Medium Regiment Royal Artillery (today: 32nd Regiment)
- 44th RTGA (1965). A History of the 44th Royal Tank Regiment in the War of 1939–45. Brighton (Sussex): 44th Royal Tank Regimental Association. — 44th Royal Tank Regiment
- Barclay, Cyril N. (1948). The History of the Cameronians (Scottish Rifles). London: Sifton. — Cameronians (Scottish Rifles)
- ——— (1952). The History of the Royal Northumberland Fusiliers in the Second World War. London: Clowes. — Royal Northumberland Fusiliers
- ———, ed. (1952). The London Scottish in the Second World War, 1939–1945. London: Clowes. — London Scottish regiment
- ——— (1953). The History of the Duke of Wellington's Regiment, 1919–1952. London: Sifton. — Duke of Wellington's Regiment
- ——— (1953). The Regimental history of the 3rd Queen Alexandra's Own Gurkha Rifles. Vol. 2. London: Clowes. — 3rd Queen Alexandra's Own Gurkha Rifles
- ——— (1959). The History of the Sherwood Foresters (Nottinghamshire and Derbyshire Regiment), 1919–1957. Aldershot: Gale & Polden. — Sherwood Foresters (Nottinghamshire and Derbyshire Regiment)
- ——— (1963). History of the 16/5th The Queen's Royal Lancers, 1925–1961. Aldershot: Gale & Polden. — 16th/5th The Queen's Royal Lancers
- Barker, Frank R. P. (1950). History of the Argyll and Sutherland Highlanders, 9th Battalion, 54th Light AA Regiment, 1939–45. London: Nelson. — 54th Light Anti-Aircraft Regiment (formerly 9th Battalion, Argyll and Sutherland Highlanders)
- Beddington, William R. (1954). A History of the Queen's Bays (the 2nd Dragoon Guards), 1929–1945. Winchester: Warren. — 2nd Dragoon Guards (Queen's Bays)
- Bell, Archibald C. (1954). History of the Manchester Regiment: First and Second Battalions, 1922–1948. Altrincham (Cheshire): Sherratt. — Manchester Regiment
- Birdwood, Christopher B. B. (1952). The Worcestershire Regiment, 1922–1950. Aldershot: Gale & Polden. — Worcestershire Regiment
- Blight, Gordon (1953). The History of the Royal Berkshire Regiment (Princess Charlotte of Wales's), 1920–1947. London: Staples. — Royal Berkshire Regiment
- Bouskell-Wade, George C. (1948). There is honour likewise...: the story of 154 (Leicestershire Yeomanry) Field Regiment. Leicester: Backus. — 154th (Leicestershire Yeomanry) Field Regiment
- Brelsford, William V., ed. (1954). The Story of the Northern Rhodesia Regiment. Lusaka: Government Printer. — Northern Rhodesia Regiment
- Bright, Joan (1949). History of the Northumberland Hussars Yeomanry, 1924–1949. Newcastle-upon-Tyne: Mawson, Swan & Morgan. — Northumberland Hussars
- ———, ed. (1951). The Ninth Queen's Royal Lancers, 1936–1945: the story of an Armoured Regiment in battle. Aldershot: Gale & Polden. — 9th Queen's Royal Lancers
- Capleton, Eric W. (1963). Shadash-149: The War Story of the 149th Regiment RA, 1939–1945. Wallasey: Old Comrades. — 149th Royal Artillery Field Regiment
- Carew, Tim (1967). The History of the Royal Norfolk Regiment. London: Hamilton. — Royal Norfolk Regiment
- Carver, Richard M. P. (1954). Second to none: the Royal Scots Greys, 1919–1945. Glasgow: McCorquodale. — Royal Scots Greys
- Chaplin, Howard D. (1954). The Queen's Own Royal West Kent Regiment, 1920–1950. London: Joseph. — Queen's Own Royal West Kent Regiment
- Clarke, Dudley (1952). The Eleventh at war: being the story of the Xlth Hussars (Prince Albert's Own) through the years 1934–1945. London: Joseph. — 11th Hussars
- Clarke, Edward B.; Tillott, Alan T. (1951). From Kent to Kohima: being the history of the 4th Battalion The Queen's Own Royal West Kent Regiment (T.A.), 1939–1947. Aldershot: Gale & Polden. — Queen's Own Royal West Kent Regiment
- Cooper, John P. (1953). The History of the 110th Field Artillery. Baltimore: War Records Division Maryland Historical. — 110th Royal Artillery Field Regiment
- Cunliffe, Marcus (1957). History of the Royal Warwickshire Regiment, 1919–1955. London: Clowes. — Royal Warwickshire Regiment
- Daniell, David S. (1955). Regimental History of the Royal Hampshire Regiment: 1918–54. Vol. 3. London: Gale & Polden. — Royal Hampshire Regiment
- ——— (1957). History of the East Surrey Regiment: 1920–52. Vol. 4. London: Benn. — East Surrey Regiment
- Davy, George M. O. (1953). The Seventh and three enemies: the story of World War II and the 7th Queen's Own Hussars. Cambridge: Heffer. — 7th Queen's Own Hussars
- Dean, Charles G. T. (1955). The Loyal Regiment (North Lancashire), 1919–1953. Fulwood Barracks (Lancashire): Loyal Regiment. — Loyal Regiment
- DeCourcy, John; et al. (Cyril Lomax) (1952). The History of the Welch Regiment, 1919–1951; amplified and enlarged by Major-General C. E. N. Lomax. Cardiff: Western Mail. — Welch Regiment
- Durand, Algernon T. M.; Hastings, Robert H. W. (1952). The London Rifle Brigade, 1919–1950. Aldershot: Gale & Polden. — London Rifle Brigade
- East Lancashire Regiment (1953). History of the East Lancashire Regiment in the War, 1939–1945. Manchester: Rawson. — East Lancashire Regiment
- Eeles, Henry S. (1945). The History of the 17th Light Anti-Aircraft Regiment R.A., 1938–1945. Tunbridge Wells (Kent): Courier. — 17th Light Anti-Aircraft Regiment
- Ellenberger, G. F. (1961). History of the King's Own Yorkshire Light Infantry, 1939–1948. Aldershot: Gale & Polden. — King's Own Yorkshire Light Infantry
- Ellis, L. F. (1946). The Welsh Guards at War. Aldershot: Gale & Polden. — Welsh Guards
- Erskine, David H. (1957). The Scots Guards, 1919–1955. London: Clowes. — Scots Guards
- Fergusson, Bernard (1950). The Black Watch and the King's enemies. London: Collins. — Black Watch
- Ffrench Blake, Robert Lifford Valentine (1962). A history of the 17/21st Lancers, 1922–1959. London: Macmillan. — 17th/21st Lancers
- Fitzgerald, D. J. L. (1949). History of the Irish Guards in the Second World War. Aldershot: Gale & Polden. — Irish Guards
- Fitzroy, Olivia (1961). Men of valour: the third volume of the history of the VIII King's Royal Irish Hussars, 1927–1958. Gyrn Castle (Flintshire): Sir Geoffrey V. Bates. — 8th King's Royal Irish Hussars
- Flower, Desmond (1950). History of the Argyll and Sutherland Highlanders, 5th Battalion, 91st Anti-Tank Regiment, 1939-45. London: Nelson. — 91st Anti-Tank Regiment (formerly 5th Battalion, Argyll and Sutherland Highlanders)
- Forbes, Patrick; Nicolson, Nigel (1949). The Grenadier Guards in the War of 1939–45. Vol. 1–2. Aldershot: Gale & Polden. — Grenadier Guards
- Foster, R. C. G. (1953). History of the Queen's Royal Regiment. Aldershot: Gale & Polden. — Queen's Royal Regiment
- Fox, Frank (1951). The Royal Inniskilling Fusiliers in the Second World War: a record of the war as seen by the Royal Inniskilling Fusiliers, three battalions of which served. Aldershot: Gale & Polden. — Royal Inniskilling Fusiliers
- Gates, Lionel C. (1953). The History of the Tenth Foot, 1919-1950; compiled from War Diaries, Officers Narratives and other Sources. Aldershot: Gale & Polden. — Royal Lincolnshire Regiment (10th Regiment of Foot)
- Graham, Andrew (1964). Sharpshooters at war: the 3rd, 4th and the 3rd/4th County of London Yeomanry, 1939–1945. London: Sharpshooters Regimental Association. — 3rd/4th County of London Yeomanry (Sharpshooters)
- Grenadier Guards Regiment (1946). The Grenadier Guards, 1939–1945. Aldershot: Gale & Polden. — Grenadier Guards
- Godfrey, Ernest G. (1966). The History of the Duke of Cornwall's Light Infantry, 1939–45. Aldershot: Wellington. — Duke of Cornwall's Light Infantry
- Gunning, Hugh (1948). Borderers in Battle: the War Story of the King's Own Scottish Borderers, 1939–1945. Berwick-on-Tweed: Martin. — King's Own Scottish Borderers
- Guttery, David R. (1958). The Queen's Own Worcester Hussars, 1922–1956. Stourbridge (Worcestershire): Mark & Moody. — Queen's Own Worcestershire Hussars
- Hastings, Robin H. W. (1950). The Rifle Brigade in the Second World War, 1939–1945. Aldershot: Gale & Polden. — Rifle Brigade (The Prince Consort's Own)
- Hills, Reginald J. T. (1951). Phantom was there. London: Arnold. — GHQ Liaison Regiment
- Hingston, Walter G. (1950). Never give up: the History of the King's Own Yorkshire Light Infantry, 1919–1942. London. — King's Own Yorkshire Light Infantry
- Howard, Michael; Sparrow, John (1951). The Coldstream Guards, 1920–1946. London: Oxford University Press. — Coldstream Guards
- Jervois, Wilfrid J. (1953). The History of the Northamptonshire Regiment, 1934–1948. Northampton: Northamptonshire Regiment. — Northamptonshire Regiment
- Johnson, Roy F. (1958). Regimental Fire: The Honourable Artillery Company in World War 2, 1939–1945. London: HAC. — Honourable Artillery Company
- Jones, Arthur J. (1949). The Second Derbyshire Yeomanry: an account of the Regiment during World War, 1939–45. Bristol: White Swan. — Derbyshire Yeomanry
- Jolly, Alan (1952). Blue Flash: The Story of an Armoured Regiment. London: Solicitors' Law Society. — 144th Regiment Royal Armoured Corps
- Kemp, James C. (1963). The History of the Royal Scots Fusiliers, 1919–1959. Glasgow: House of Grant. — Royal Scots Fusiliers
- Kemp, Peter K. (1950). The Staffordshire Yeomanry (Q.O.R.R.) in the First and Second World Wars, 1914–1918, and 1939–1945. Aldershot: Gale & Polden. — Staffordshire Yeomanry (Queen's Own Royal Regiment)
- ——— (1953). History of the Royal Norfolk Regiment, 1919–1951. Vol. 3. Norwich: Regimental Association of the Royal Norfolk Regiment. — Royal Norfolk Regiment
- ———; Graves, John (1960). The Red Dragon: the Story of the Royal Welch Fusiliers, 1919–1945. Aldershot: Gale & Polden. — Royal Welch Fusiliers
- Kemsley, Walter; Riesco, Michael R. (1950). The Scottish Lion on Patrol: being the Story of the 15th Scottish Reconnaissance Regiment, 1943–1946. Bristol: White Swan. — 15th Scottish Reconnaissance Regiment
- Kensington Old Comrades Association (1952). The Kensingtons': Princess Louise's Kensington Regiment, Second World War. London: Kensington Old Comrades Association. — Kensington Regiment (Princess Louise's)
- Lamb, David A. (1971). View from the Bridge: The Story of the 191st Field Regiment of the Royal Artillery, the Herts & Essex Yeomanry, 1942–1944. Watford (Hertfordshire): Lamb. — 191st Field Regiment (Hertfordshire and Essex Yeomanry)
- Lindsay, Martin (1946). So few got through: the Gordon Highlanders in the 51st Highland Division from the Normandy beachhead to the Baltic. London: Collins. — Gordon Highlanders
- Lindsay, Thomas M. (1952). Sherwood Rangers. London: Mathieson. — Sherwood Rangers Yeomanry
- Martin, Thomas A. (1952). The Essex Regiment, 1929–1950. Warley Barracks (Brentwood): Essex Regiment Association. OCLC 4045659. — Essex Regiment
- McCorquodale, D.; et al. (1950). History of the King's Dragoon Guards, 1938–1945. Glasgow: McCorquodale. — King's Dragoon Guards
- Miles, Wilfrid (1961). The Life of a Regiment: the Gordon Highlanders. Aberdeen: Aberdeen University Press. — Gordon Highlanders
- Muir, Augustus (1961). The First of Foot: the History of the Royal Scots (The Royal Regiment). Edinburgh: Royal Scots History Committee. — Royal Scots (Royal Regiment)
- Mullaly, Brian R. (1955). The South Lancashire Regiment: the Prince of Wales's Volunteers. Bristol: White Swan. — South Lancashire Regiment
- Neville, James E. H., ed. (1950–54). The Oxfordshire & Buckinghamshire Light Infantry Chronicle: the record of the 43rd, 52nd, 4th, 5th, 6th, 7th, 70th, 1st and 2nd Buckinghamshire Battalions, the Regimental Depot and Regimental Training Centre in the Second German War. Vol. 1–4. Gale & Polden. — Oxfordshire and Buckinghamshire Light Infantry
- Nicholson, Walter N. (1948). The Suffolk Regiment, 1928–1946. Ipswich: East Anglian Magazine. — Suffolk Regiment
- Orde, Roden P. G. (1953). The Household Cavalry at war: Second Household Cavalry Regiment. Aldershot: Gale & Polden. — 2nd Household Cavalry Regiment
- Parkinson, Cyril N. (1950). Always a Fusilier: the war history of the Royal Fusiliers (City of London Regiment), 1939–1945. London: Sampson Low. — Royal Fusiliers (City of London Regiment)
- Paul, William P. (1949). History of the Argyll and Sutherland Highlanders, 6th Battalion, 93rd Anti-Tank Regiment, R.A. London: Nelson. — 93rd Anti-Tank Regiment (formerly 6th Battalion, Argyll and Sutherland Highlanders)
- Peters, G. W. N. (1970). The Bedfordshire and Hertfordshire Regiment (the 16th Regiment of Foot). London: Cooper. — Bedfordshire and Hertfordshire Regiment
- Pitman, Stuart (1950). Second Royal Gloucestershire Hussars: Libya–Egypt, 1941–1942. London: St Catherine. — Royal Gloucestershire Hussars
- Pitt, P. W. (1946). Royal Wilts: the History of the Royal Wiltshire Yeomanry, 1920–1945. London: Burrop, Mathieson. — Royal Wiltshire Yeomanry
- Pitt-Rivers, Julian A. (1956). The story of the Royal Dragoons, 1938-1945: being the history of the Royal Dragoons in the campaigns of North Africa, the Middle East, Italy and North West Europe. London: Clowes. — Royal Dragoons
- Pocock, John G. (1962). The Spirit of a Regiment: being the History of the 19th King George's Own Lancers, 1921–1947. Aldershot: Gale & Polden. — 19th King George's Own Lancers
- Queen's Own Cameron Highlanders (1953). Historical records of the Queen's Own Cameron Highlanders. Vol. 5–6. Edinburgh: Blackwood. — Queen's Own Cameron Highlanders
- Rissik, David (1953). The D.L.I. at war: the history of the Durham Light Infantry, 1939–1945. Brancepeth Castle (Durham): Durham Light Infantry. — Durham Light Infantry
- Sandes, Edward W. C. (1952). From Pyramid to Pagoda: the Story of the West Yorkshire Regiment (The Prince of Wales's Own) in the War, 1939–45, and Afterwards. York: West Yorkshire Regiment. — West Yorkshire Regiment
- Saunders, Hilary St G. (1950). The Red Beret: The Story of the Parachute Regiment at War, 1940–1945. London: Joseph. — Parachute Regiment
- Scott, Anthony A. (1950). Record of a reconnaissance regiment: a history of the 43rd Reconnaissance Regiment (The Gloucester Regiment), 1939–1945. Bristol: White Swan. — 43rd (Wessex) Reconnaissance Regiment
- Sellar, Robert J. B. (1961). The Fife and Forfar Yeomanry, 1919–1956. Edinburgh: Blackwood. — Fife and Forfar Yeomanry
- Shears, Philip J. (1948). The Story of the Border Regiment, 1939–1945. London: Nisbet. — Border Regiment
- Sheffield, O. F. (1956). The York and Lancaster Regiment: 1939–53. Vol. 3. Aldershot: Gale & Polden. — York and Lancaster Regiment
- Stevens, George R. (1952). History of the 2nd King Edward VII's Own Goorkha Rifles (The Sirmoor Rifles). Aldershot: Gale & Polden. — 2nd King Edward VII's Own Gurkha Rifles (The Sirmoor Rifles)
- Sutherland, Douglas (1969). The Argyll and Sutherland Highlanders (the 91st and 93rd Highlanders). London: Cooper. — Argyll and Sutherland Highlanders
- Synge, William A. T. (1952). The Story of the Green Howards, 1939–1945. Richmond (Yorkshire): Green Howards. — Green Howards
- Underhill, William G., ed. (1958). The Royal Leicestershire Regiment, 17th Foot: a history of the years, 1928–1956. South Wigston (Leicestershire): Royal Leicestershire Regiment. — Royal Leicestershire Regiment
- Wake, Hereward; Deedes, W. F. (1949). Swift and bold: the story of the King's Royal Rifle Corps in the Second World War, 1939–1945. Aldershot: Gale & Polden. — King's Royal Rifle Corps
- Wyndham, Humphrey (1952). The Household Cavalry at War: First Household Cavalry Regiment. Aldershot: Gale & Polden. — 1st Household Cavalry Regiment

==== United States ====
- Blue, Allan G. (1967). The Fortunes of War: The 492nd Bomb Group on Daylight Operations. Fallbrook (CA/USA): Aero. — 492nd Bomb Group
- Lord, William G. (1948). History of the 508th Parachute Infantry. Washington DC: Infantry Journal Press. — 508th Parachute Infantry Regiment
- Morrison, Wilbur H. (1962). The incredible 305th: the 'Can Do' bombers of World War II. New York: Duell. — 305th Bomb Group
- Robinett, Paul M. (1958). Armor Command: The Personal Story of a Commander of the 13th Armored Regiment of CCB, 1st Armored Division and of the Armored School during World War II. Washington DC. — 13th Armored Regiment (Light)
- United States Army (1945). The 119th Field Artillery Group: World War II, European Theater of Operations. Offenbach (Germany): Gross-Steinheim. — 119th Field Artillery Group (later: 119th Regiment)
- ——— (1945). History 67th Armored Regiment. Brunswick: Westermann. — 67th Armored Regiment

=== Battalions ===
Includes OF-4 formations, such as army battalions or air force squadrons (French air force: Escadron, German air force: Gruppe).

==== Australia ====
- Aitken, Edward F. (1953). The Story of the 2/2nd Australian Pioneer Battalion. Melbourne: 2/2nd APB Association. — 2/2nd Australian Pioneer Battalion
- Allchin, Frank (1958). Purple and Blue: The History of the 2/10th Battalion, A.I.F. (The Adelaide Rifles), 1939–1945. Adelaide: Griffin. — 2/10th Battalion
- Benson, S. E. (1952). The Story of the 42 Australia Infantry Battalion. Sydney: Dymock's Book Arcade. — 42nd Battalion
- Boss-Walker, Geoffrey (1948). Desert Sand and Jungle Green: A Pictorial History of the 2/43rd Australian Infantry Battalion (Ninth Division) in the Second World War, 1939–1945. Hobart (Tas./Austr.): Oldham. — 2/43rd Battalion
- Burns, John (1960). The Brown and the Blue Diamond at War: The Story of the 2/27th Battalion A.I.F. Adelaide: Griffin. — 2/27th Battalion
- Charlott, Rupert (1952). The Unofficial History of the 29/46th Australian Infantry Battalion A.I.F. Sept. 1939 – Sept. 1945. Sydney: Halstead. — 29th/46th Battalion
- Fearnside, Geoffrey (1953). Bayonets Abroad: A History of the 2/13th Battalion A.I.F. in the Second World War. Sydney: Waite & Bull. — 2/13th Battalion
- Firkins, Peter C. (1964). Strike and Return: The Story of the Exploits of No. 460 R.A.A.F. Bomber Command in the World War. Perth: Paterson Brokensha. — No. 460 Squadron RAAF
- Glenn, John G. (1960). From Tobruk to Tarakan: The Story of the 2/48th Battalion A.I.F. Adelaide: Rigby. — 2/48th Battalion
- Lawson, J. H. W. (1951). Four Five Five: The Story of 455 (R.A.A.F.) Squadron. Melbourne: Wilke. — No. 455 Squadron RAAF
- McFarlan, Graeme (1961). Etched in Green: The History of the 22nd Australian Infantry Battalion, 1939–1946. Adelaide: Griffin. — 22nd Battalion
- Marshall, Alan J. (1946). Nulli Secundus Log: [2/2nd Australian Infantry Battalion, A.I.F.] Sydney: Consolidated. — 2/2nd Battalion
- Masel, Philip (1961). The second 28th: the story of a famous battalion of the 9th Australian Division. Perth: 2/28th Battalion and 24th Anti-Tank Comrades Association. — 2/28th Battalion
- Matthews, Russell (1961). Militia Battalion at War: The History of the 58/59th Australian Infantry Battalion in the Second World War. Melbourne: 58/59th Battalion Association. — 58th Battalion; 59th Battalion; 58th/59th Battalion
- Penfold, A. W.; et al. (1950). Galleghan's Greyhounds: The Story of the 2/30th Australian Infantry Battalion, 22nd November, 1940 – 10th October, 1945. Sydney: Angus & Robertson. — 2/30th Battalion
- Russell, William B. (1948). The Second Fourteenth Battalion: A History of an Australian Infantry Battalion in the Second World War. Sydney: Angus & Robertson. — 2/14th Battalion
- Selby, David (1957). Hell and High Fever. London: Angus & Robertson. — 2/22nd Battalion
- Serle, R. P., ed. (1963). The Second Twentyfourth Australian Infantry Battalion of the 9th Australian Division: A History. Brisbane: Jacarawa. — 24th Battalion
- Uren Malcolm, John L. (1959). A Thousand Men at War: The Story of the 2/16th Battalion, A.I.F. London: Heinemann. — 2/16th Battalion

==== United Kingdom ====
- Anderson, Robert C. B. (1956). History of the Argyll and Sutherland Highlanders, 1st Battalion: 1939–54. Vol. 2. Stirling: Hughes. — 1st Battalion, Argyll and Sutherland Highlanders
- Brammall, Ronald (1965). The Tenth: a Record of Service of the 10th Battalion, the Parachute Regiment, 1942–1945, and the 10th Battalion, the Parachute Regiment (T.A.) (county of London), 1947–1965. Ipswich: Eastgate. — 10th Battalion, Parachute Regiment
- Bredin, A. E. C. (1946). Three Assault Landings: the story of the 1st Battalion, The Dorsetshire Regiment in Sicily, Italy and North West Europe. Aldershot: Gale & Polden. — 1st Battalion, Dorsetshire Regiment
- Brickhill, Paul (1951). The Dam Busters. London: Evans. — No. 617 Squadron RAF
- Bullen, Roy E. (1958). History of the 2/7th Battalion, The Queen's Royal Regiment, 1939–1946. London: Neale. — 2/7th Battalion, Queen's Royal Regiment
- Cameron, Ian C. (1946). History of the Argyll and Sutherland Highlanders, 7th Battalion from El Alamein to Germany. London: Nelson. — 7th Battalion, Argyll and Sutherland Highlanders
- Graham, Frederick C. C. (1948). History of the Argyll and Sutherland Highlanders, 1st Battalion (Princess Louise's), 1939-1945. London: Nelson. — 1st Battalion, Argyll and Sutherland Highlanders
- Lewis, Peter J. (1949). 8th Battalion; the Durham Light Infantry, 1939–1945. Newcastle-upon-Tyne: Bealls. — 8th Battalion, Durham Light Infantry
- Madden, B. J. G. (1948). The History of the 6th Battalion, the Black Watch (Royal Highland Regiment) 1939–1945. Perth (Scotland): Leslie. — 6th Battalion, Black Watch
- Malcolm, Alec D. (1949). History of the Argyll and Sutherland Highlanders, 8th Battalion, 1939–47. London: Nelson. — 8th Battalion, Argyll and Sutherland Highlanders
- McElwee, William L. (1949). History of the Argyll and Sutherland Highlanders, 2nd Battalion, reconstituted, European Campaign, 1944–45. London: Nelson. — 2nd Battalion, Argyll and Sutherland Highlanders
- Parsons, Anthony D.; et al. (1955). The Maroon Square: a History of the 4th Battalion the Wiltshire Regiment (Duke of Edinburgh's) in North West Europe, 1939–46. — 4th Battalion, Wiltshire Regiment
- Quilter, David C. (1947). No Dishonourable Name: the 2nd and 3rd Battalions, Coldstream Guards, 1939–1946. London: Clowes. — 2nd Battalion, Coldstream Guards; 3rd Battalion, Coldstream Guards
- Watkins, G. J. B. (1956). From Normandy to the Weser: the War History of the Fourth Battalion, The Dorset Regiment. Dorchester: Dorset. — 4th Battalion, Dorsetshire Regiment
- White, Oliver G. W. (1948). Straight on for Tokyo: the war history of the 2nd Battalion the Dorsetshire Regiment, 54th Foot, 1939–1948. Aldershot: Gale & Polden. — 2nd Battalion, Dorsetshire Regiment

==== United States ====
- Braziller, George, ed. (1945). The 133rd AAA Gun Battalion. Munich: Oldenburg. — 133rd Anti-Aircraft Artillery Battalion
- Buckeridge, Justin P. (1945). 550 Infantry Airborne Battalion. Birmingham (MI/USA): Boots, The Airborne Quarterly. — 550th Airborne Infantry Battalion
- Buckeridge, Justin P. (1978). Bolt From the Blue: 550th Airborne Battalion 1941–1945. Battery Press. — 550th Airborne Infantry Battalion
- Bullard, Oral (1950). The Hot Loop: A History of the 383rd Anti-Aircraft Artillery Battalion: U.S. January 1943 – November 1945; Overseas November 1943–December 1945. Waterloo (Iowa). — 383rd Anti-Aircraft Artillery Battalion
- Burwell, Lewis C. (1947). Scrapbook: a Pictorial and Historical Record of the Deeds, Exploits, Adventures, Travels and Life of the 27th Troop Carrier Squadron for the Year 1944. Charlotte. — 27th Troop Carrier Squadron
- Casper, Jack A. (1947). History and personnel, 489th, 340th Bomb Group: combat campaign participated in by the 489th Bomb Squadron. Middletown (Ohio, USA). — 489th Bombardment Squadron
- Farnum, Sayward H. (1946). The Five By Five: A History of the 555th Anti-Aircraft Artillery Automatic Weapons Battalion (mobile). Boston (Mass.): Athenaeum. — 555th Anti-Aircraft Artillery Automatic Weapons Battalion
- Gise, Benjamin; Richard, Van N., eds. (1945). On Target: A History of the 862nd AAA-AW-BN in the Second World War. New York: Marbridge. — 862nd Anti-Aircraft Artillery Automatic Weapons Battalion
- Klemow, Sid, ed. (1945). The Tracer: A Record of the 195th AAA AW BN(SP) Mojave to Berlin. Halle (Germany). — 195th Anti-Aircraft Artillery Battalion
- Lowery, Tom, ed. (1945). 778 AAA AW BN(SP) from Activation to Victory. Munich. — 778th Anti-Aircraft Artillery Battalion
- Scott, Peter T. (1946). Shoot, Move and Communicate: 194th Field Artillery Battalion. Munich. — 194th Field Artillery Battalion
- Smith, Frank E. (1946). Battle Diary: The Story of the 243rd Field Artillery Battalion in Combat. New York: Hobson. — 243rd Field Artillery Battalion
- United States Army (1945). 184th AAA Gun Battalion: Iceland, England, France, Belgium, Holland, Germany. Fulda. — 184th Anti-Aircraft Artillery Battalion
- ——— (1945). 345th Field Artillery Battalion, 90th Infantry Division, Third U.S. Army. Munich (Germany): Bruckmann. — 345th Field Artillery Battalion
- ——— (1945). From Texas to Teisnach with the 457 AAA AW Battalion. Nancy: Humblot. — 457th Anti-Aircraft Artillery Battalion
- ——— (1945). The History of 375 Field Artillery BN. Stuttgart. — 375th Field Artillery Battalion
- ——— (1945). On the Way: Combat Experience of the 693rd Field Artillery BN in the European Theater of Operations: Normandy, Northern France, Rhineland, Central Europe. Salzburg (Austria). — 693rd Field Artillery Battalion
- ——— (1945). Our Story: 387th AAA AW BN(SP). Göttingen (Germany). — 387th Anti-Aircraft Artillery Battalion
- ——— (1945). Thundering Thunderbolt: The Story of the 790th Field Artillery Battalion. Laon (France). — 790th Field Artillery Battalion
- ——— (1946). 305th Field Artillery Battalion, 27th Infantry Division. Hakodate (Japan): Yuji Itagaki. — 305th Field Artillery Battalion
- ——— (1947). Thunderbolt Battalion, 1941–1945: 65th Armored Field Artillery Battalion. Philadelphia: Jardine. — 65th Armored Field Artillery Battalion
- ——— (1947). War History of the 536th AAA AW BN(M) 1942–1944. Baton Rouge (LA/USA): Army & Navy Pictorial. — 536th Anti-Aircraft Battalion

=== Companies ===
Includes OF-3 formations.

==== Australia ====
- Callinan, Bernard J. (1954). Independent Company: The 2/2 and 2/4 Australian Independent Companies in Portuguese Timor, 1941–1943. London: Heinemann. — 2/2nd Commando Squadron and 2/4th Commando Squadron

==== United Kingdom ====
- Morris, Arthur H. M., ed. (1952). The 'Four-Two': scraps from the history of the 42nd Field Company, R.E. Aldershot: Gale & Polden. — 42nd Field Company, Corps of Royal Engineers

==== United States ====
- Jones, William E. (1951). Buzzings of Company B: 23rd Armored Infantry Battalion of the 7th Armored (Lucky Seventh) Division. Winston-Salem (NC/USA): Clay. — B Company, 23rd Armored Infantry Battalion, 7th Armored Division

== See also ==
- Bibliography of World War II
- Bibliography of World War II battles and campaigns in East Asia, South East Asia and the Pacific
- Bibliography of World War II battles and campaigns in Europe, North Africa and the Middle East
