= Assignment to Catastrophe =

Two volume memoir by Sir Edward Spears

Assignment to Catastrophe is a two volume memoir by Sir Edward Spears of his experiences as Winston Churchill's personal representative to the Prime Minister of France from August 1939 to June 1940 and the Fall of France. As a source for historians it provides a valuable insight into the interior workings of the French governments of Paul Reynaud and Edouard Daladier from the perspective of an outsider.

== Prelude to Dunkirk ==
The first volume is titled Prelude to Dunkirk and covers the period from 1 August 1939 to 31 May 1940.

The book opens with an idyllic description of luncheon with the Churchills at Chartwell on 1 August 1939, and introduces a theme which becomes extremely important throughout the work: Spears' great admiration for Winston Churchill. The description of a sunny, enjoyable afternoon is contrasted with the discussion of the impending war in which Spears is careful to note all Churchill's (eventually correct) predictions about the coming war.

== The Fall of France ==
The second volume, The Fall of France takes up the narrative from 1 June and continues it until Spears' half-humorous, half-tragic account of his departure from France with General Charles de Gaulle on 17 June. Contemplating de Gaulle's long exile Spears commented that 'his martyrdom had begun.'
