= Naim Frashëri Publishing House =

Albanian publisher

The Naim Frashëri Publishing House (Albanian: Shtëpia Botuese "Naim Frashëri"), was one of the most important publishers in Albania. During Communist Albania, it was the only existing literature publisher of the country. Children's writer, Odhise Grillo, has worked there as an editor for many years.

In 1973, the 8 Nëntori Publishing House split from the Naim Frashëri and dedicated itself to nonfictional and political publications, whereas Naim Frashëri focused only on fictional literature.

The publishing house organized national literature competitions.
