= Bibliography of World War II warships =

This is a bibliography of World War II warships. This list aims to include historical sources and literature (but not fictional works) related to individual warships of World War II. This article forms a part of the larger bibliography of World War II.

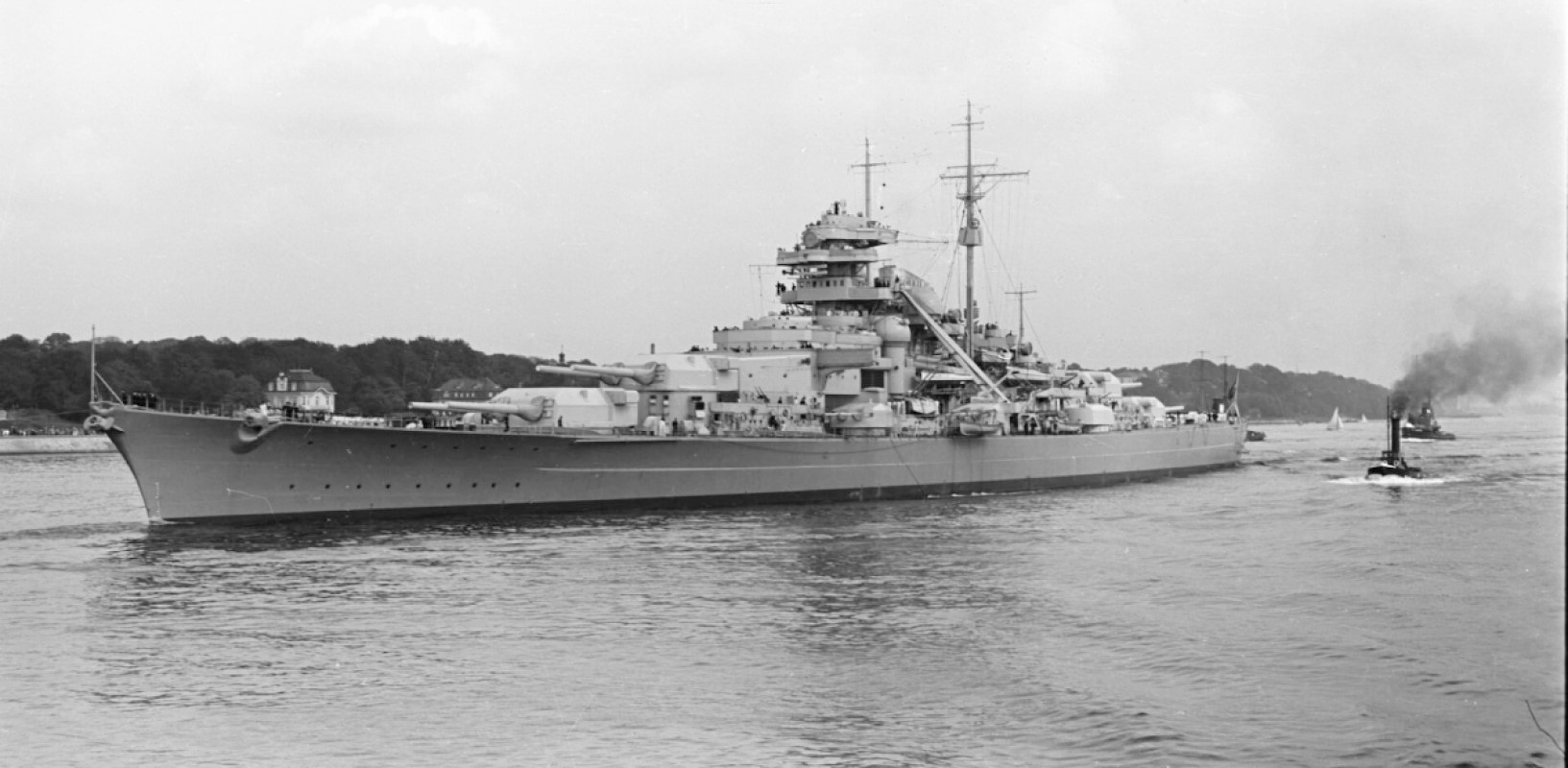
The Bismarck is just one of the warships of World War II that spawned a large dedicated bibliography of historical works related to its service.

The article covers works about warship classes and groups of ships as well as books about individual warships. Works are sorted primarily into their respective types of warships (aircraft carriers, battleships, etc.) and then secondarily into national categories (Germany, United Kingdom, etc.).

== Bibliography ==
=== Aircraft carriers ===
==== Germany ====
- Noppen, Ryan K.; Dildy, Douglas C. (2022). German and Italian Aircraft Carriers of World War II. Oxford: Osprey Publishing. ISBN 978-1-4728-4676-1.

==== Italy ====
- Noppen, Ryan K.; Dildy, Douglas C. (2022). German and Italian Aircraft Carriers of World War II. Oxford: Osprey Publishing. ISBN 978-1-4728-4676-1.

==== Japan ====
- Stille, Mark (2005). Imperial Japanese Navy Aircraft Carriers 1921–45. Oxford: Osprey Publishing. ISBN 978-1-84176-853-3.

==== United Kingdom ====
- Formidable Commission (1948). H.M.S. Formidable. London: Seeley. — HMS Formidable
- Jameson, William (1957). Ark Royal, 1939–1941. London: Hart-Davis. — HMS Ark Royal
- Konstam, Angus (2010). British Aircraft Carriers 1939–45. Oxford: Osprey Publishing. ISBN 978-1-84908-079-8.

==== United States ====
- Benton, Brantford B., ed. (1946). Battle Baby: A Pictorial History of the Escort Carrier U.S.S. Savo Island (CVE78). Baton Rouge: Army & Navy. — USS Savo Island
- Belleau Wood staff (1946). Flight Quarters: The War Story of the U.S.S. Belleau Wood Aircraft Carrier. Cole-Holmquist. — USS Belleau Wood
- Burns, Eugene (1944). Then there was one! The U.S.S. Enterprise and the First Year of War. New York: Harcourt. — USS Enterprise
- Ferris, James S., ed. (1946). The Aircraft Carrier, U.S.S. Wasp, CV 18. Boston: Crosby. — USS Wasp
- Gilbert, Price (1946). The Escort Carriers in Action: The Story in Pictures of the Escort Carrier Force, U.S. Pacific Fleet, 1945, with a Supplement for the Flagship U.S.S. Makin Island. Atlanta (GA/USA): Ruralist. — USS Makin Island
- Griffin, Alexander R. (1943). A Ship to Remember: The Saga of the Hornet. New York: Howell Soskin. — USS Hornet
- Johnston, Stanley (1942). Queen of the Flat Tops: The U.S.S. Lexington and the Coral Sea Battle. New York: Dutton. — USS Lexington
- Stafford, Edward P. (1962). The Big E: The Story of the USS Enterprise. New York: Random House. — USS Enterprise
- Steichen, Edward (1947). The Blue Ghost: A Photographic Log and Personal Narrative of the Aircraft Carrier U.S.S. Lexington in Combat Operations. New York: Harcourt. — USS Lexington
- Stille, Mark (2005). US Navy Aircraft Carriers 1922–45: Prewar classes. Oxford: Osprey Publishing. ISBN 978-1-84176-890-8.
- ————— (2007). US Navy Aircraft Carriers 1942–45. Oxford: Osprey Publishing. ISBN 978-1-84603-037-6.
- ————— (2017). US Navy Escort Carriers 1942–45. Oxford: Osprey Publishing. ISBN 978-1-4728-1810-2.

=== Battlecruisers ===
==== United Kingdom ====
- Ash, Bernard (1960). Someone had blundered: the story of the 'Repulse' and the 'Prince of Wales'. London: Joseph. — HMS Repulse (Sinking of Prince of Wales and Repulse)
- Bennett, Geoffrey (1973). The loss of the 'Prince of Wales' and 'Repulse'. 1973: Allen. — HMS Repulse
- Bradford, Ernle (1959). The mighty 'Hood'. London: Hodder & Stoughton. — HMS Hood
- Hough, Richard (1963). The hunting of Force Z: the brief controversial life of the modern battleship, and its tragic close with the destruction of the 'Prince of Wales' and 'Repulse' [US title: "Death of the Battleship"]. London: Collins. — HMS Repulse
- Konstam, Angus (2003). British Battlecruisers 1939–45. Oxford: Osprey Publishing. ISBN 978-1-84176-633-1.

=== Battleships ===
==== France ====
- Noppen, Ryan K. (2019). French Battleships 1914–45. Osprey Publishing. ISBN 978-1-4728-1819-5.

==== Germany ====
Bismarck

- Berthold, Will (1958). The sinking of the 'Bismarck'. London: Longmans Green.
- Brennand, Frank (1960). Sink the 'Bismarck'!. London: Landsborough.
- Forester, Cecil S. (1959). Hunting the 'Bismarck' [U.S. title: "The last nine days of the Bismarck"]. London: Joseph.
- Grenfell, Russell (1948). The 'Bismarck' episode. London: Faber.
- Kennedy, Ludovic H. C. (1974). Pursuit: the chase and the sinking of the Bismarck. New York: Viking.
- McMurtrie, Francis E. (1941). The cruise of the Bismarck. London: Hutchinson.
- Mullenheim-Rechberg, Burkhard (1980). Battleship Bismarck. Annapolis (MD/USA): Naval Institute.
- Schofield, Brian B. (1972). The Loss of the Bismarck. London: Allan.
- Shirer, William L. (1962). The sinking of the 'Bismarck'. New York: Random House.
- Sopocko, Eryk K. S. (1942). Gentlemen, the Bismarck has been sunk. London: Methuen.

Gneisenau

- Garrett, Richard (1978). Scharnhorst and Gneisenau: The Elusive Sisters. Newton Abbot, Devon: David & Charles.
- Kemp, Peter K. (1975). The Escape of the Scharnhorst and Gneisenau. London: Ian Allan.

Scharnhorst

- Busch, Fritz-Otto (1956). The drama of the Scharnhorst: a factual account from the German viewpoint. London: Hale.
- Garrett, Richard (1978). Scharnhorst and Gneisenau: The Elusive Sisters. Newton Abbot, Devon: David & Charles.
- Kemp, Peter K. (1975). The Escape of the Scharnhorst and Gneisenau. London: Ian Allan.
- Vulliez, Albert; Mordal, Jacques (1958). Battleship 'Scharnhorst'. London: Hutchinson.
- Watts, Anthony J. (1970). The loss of the 'Scharnhorst'. London: Allan.
- Winton, John (1983). The Death of the Scharnhorst. London: Arms & Armour.
- Woodward, David (1953). The 'Tirpitz': the story including the destruction of the 'Scharnhorst', of the campaign against the German battleship. London: Kimber.

Tirpitz

- Brennecke, Hans J. (1963). The 'Tirpitz': The Drama of the 'Lone Queen of the North'. London: Hale.
- Brown, David (1977). Tirpitz: The Floating Fortress. London: Arms & Armour.
- Kennedy, Ludovic (1979). Menace: The Life and Death of the Tirpitz. London: Sidgwick & Jackson.
- Peillard, Leonce (1968). Sink the Tirpitz!. London: Cape.
- Waters, John M. (1968). Bloody Winter. Princeton (NJ/USA): Van Nostrand.
- Woodward, David (1953). The 'Tirpitz': the story including the destruction of the 'Scharnhorst', of the campaign against the German battleship. London: Kimber.

==== Italy ====
- Stille, Mark (2011). Italian Battleships of World War II. Oxford: Osprey Publishing. ISBN 978-1-84908-380-5.

==== Japan ====
- Stille, Mark (2008). Imperial Japanese Navy Battleships 1941-45. Oxford: Osprey Publishing. ISBN 978-1-84603-280-6.

==== United Kingdom ====
- Ash, Bernard (1960). Someone had blundered: the story of the 'Repulse' and the 'Prince of Wales'. London: Joseph. — HMS Prince of Wales (Sinking of Prince of Wales and Repulse)
- Bennett, Geoffrey (1973). The loss of the 'Prince of Wales' and 'Repulse'. 1973: Allen. — HMS Prince of Wales
- Franklin, Alan G. C.; Franklin, Gordon (1944). One year of life: the story of H.M.S. Prince of Wales. London: Blackwood. — HMS Prince of Wales
- Hough, Richard (1963). The hunting of Force Z: the brief controversial life of the modern battleship, and its tragic close with the destruction of the 'Prince of Wales' and 'Repulse' [US title: "Death of the Battleship"]. London: Collins. — HMS Prince of Wales
- Konstam, Angus (2009). British Battleships 1939–45 (1): Queen Elizabeth and Royal Sovereign Classes. Oxford: Osprey Publishing. ISBN 978-1-84603-388-9.
- ——————— (2009). British Battleships 1939–45 (2): Nelson and King George V Classes. Oxford: Osprey Publishing. ISBN 978-1-84603-389-6.
- McKee, Alexander (1959). Black Saturday: The Tragedy of the 'Royal Oak'. London: Souvenir. — HMS Royal Oak
- Prien, Günther (1954) [1940]. I sank the 'Royal Oak'. London: Gray's Inn. — HMS Royal Oak
- Thompson, Kenneth (1946). H.M.S. Rodney at war: being an account of the part played in the war from 1939 to 1945. Hollis & Carter. — HMS Rodney

==== United States ====
- Baker, R. W., ed. (1946). History of the U.S.S. Washington, 1941–1946. New York: Kelly. — USS Washington
- Burr, Lawrence (2010). US Fast Battleships 1938–91: The Iowa Class. Oxford: Osprey Publishing. ISBN 978-1-84603-511-1. — Iowa class
- Stille, Mark (2015). US Standard-type Battleships 1941–45 (1): Nevada, Pennsylvania and New Mexico Classes. Oxford: Osprey Publishing. ISBN 978-1-4728-0696-3. — Nevada class, Pennsylvania class, New Mexico class
- ————— (2015). US Standard-type Battleships 1941–45 (2): Tennessee, Colorado and Unbuilt Classes. Oxford: Osprey Publishing. ISBN 978-1-4728-0699-4. — Tennessee class, Colorado class
- ————— (2022). Essex-Class Aircraft Carriers 1945–91. Oxford: Osprey Publishing. — Essex class (USS Essex, USS Yorktown, etc.)
- Smith, Peter C. (1976). Fighting Flotilla: HMS Laforey and her Sister Ships. London: Kimber.

=== Destroyers ===
==== Germany ====
- Williamson, Gordon (2003). German Destroyers 1939–45. Oxford: Osprey Publishing. ISBN 978-1-84176-504-4.
- Whitley, Michael J. (1983). German Destroyers in World War II. London: Arms & Armour Press.

==== Japan ====
- Stille, Mark (2017). Imperial Japanese Navy Antisubmarine Escorts 1941–45. Oxford: Osprey Publishing. ISBN 978-1-4728-1816-4.

==== Soviet Union ====
- Hill, Alexander (2018). Soviet Destroyers of World War II. Oxford: Osprey Publishing. ISBN 978-1-4728-2256-7.

==== United Kingdom ====
- Cain, T. J. (1959). H.M.S. Electra. London: Muller. — HMS Electra
- Konstam, Angus (2017). British Destroyers 1939–45: Pre-war classes. Oxford: Oxford Publishing. ISBN 978-1-4728-1637-5.
- ——————— (2017). British Destroyers 1939–45: Wartime-built classes. Oxford: Oxford Publishing. ISBN 978-1-4728-2581-0.
- Mack, George (1980). HMS Intrepid: A Memoir. London: Kimber. — HMS Intrepid
- Pattinson, William (1986). Mountbatten and the Men of the 'Kelly'. Wellington, Northants: Stephens. — HMS Kelly
- Poolman, Kenneth (1954). The 'Kelly'. London: Kimber. — HMS Kelly
- Smith, Peter C. (1968). Destroyer Leader: The Story of 'H.M.S. Faulknor'. London: Kimber. — HMS Faulknor
- —————— (1976). Fighting flotilla: HMS Laforey and her sister ships. London: Kimber. — HMS Laforey; L-class destroyers (Lance, Gurkha, Lively, Legion, Lightning, Lookout, Loyal)

==== United States ====
- Horan, James D. (1945). Action Tonight: The Story of the Destroyer O'Bannon in the Pacific. New York: Putnam. — USS O'Bannon
- Lardas, Mark (2018). US Flush-Deck Destroyers 1916–45: Caldwell, Wickes, and Clemson classes. Osprey Publishing. ISBN 978-1-4728-1997-0.
- McComb, Dave (2010). US Destroyers 1934–45: Pre-war classes. Oxford: Osprey Publishing. ISBN 978-1-84603-443-5.
- ——————— (2010). US Destroyers 1942–45: Wartime classes. Oxford: Osprey Publishing. ISBN 978-1-84603-444-2.

=== Heavy cruisers and pocket battleships ===
==== Germany ====
- Krancke, Theodor; Brennecke, Hans J. (1956). The Battleship 'Scheer'. London: Kimber. — Admiral Scheer
- Williamson, Gordon (2003). German Battleships 1939–45. Oxford: Osprey Publishing. ISBN 978-1-84176-498-6.
- ———————— (2003). German Heavy Cruisers 1939–45. Oxford: Osprey Publishing. ISBN 978-1-84176-502-0.
- ———————— (2003). German Pocket Battleships 1939–45. Oxford: Osprey Publishing. ISBN 978-1-84176-501-3.

==== Italy ====
- Stille, Mark (2018). Italian Cruisers of World War II. Oxford: Osprey Publishing. ISBN 978-1-4728-2535-3.

==== Japan ====
- Stille, Mark (2011). Imperial Japanese Navy Heavy Cruisers 1941–45. Oxford: Osprey Publishing. ISBN 978-1-84908-148-1.

==== United Kingdom ====
- Konstam, Angus (2012). British Heavy Cruisers 1939–45. Oxford: Osprey Publishing. ISBN 978-1-84908-686-8.

==== United States ====
- Luey, Allen T.; Bruvold, H. P. (1946). Minnie: The War Cruise of the U.S.S. Minneapolis. Kalamazoo (Mich./USA): Luey. — USS Minneapolis
- Newcomb, Richard F. (1960), Abandon ship! [U.S.S. Indianapolis], London: Constable — USS Indianapolis
- Stille, Mark (2014). US Heavy Cruisers 1941–45: Pre-war classes. Oxford: Osprey Publishing. ISBN 978-1-78200-629-9.
- ——— (2014). US Heavy Cruisers 1943–75. Oxford: Osprey Publishing. ISBN 978-1-78200-632-9.
- USS Louisville Officers and Crew (1946). Man of War: The Log of the United States Heavy Cruiser Louisville. Philadelphia: Dunlap. — USS Louisville
- USS Pensacola (1946). USS Pensacola CA-24, 1929 through 1946 [Alternate title: "A history of the U.S.S. Pensacola, with emphasis on the years she served in the Pacific against the Japanese during World War II"]. San Francisco: Phillips & Van Orden. — USS Pensacola

=== Light cruisers ===
==== Australia ====
- Johnston, George H. (1941). Lioness of the Seas: Story of H.M.S. Sydney [U.S. Title: "Action at Sea"]. London: Gollancz. — HMAS Sydney
- McKie, Ronald (1953). Proud Echo. Sydney: Angus & Robertson. — HMAS Perth
- Montgomery, Michael (1983). Who sank the Sydney?. London: Cooper & Secker & Warburg. — HMAS Sydney
- Ross, W. H. (1946). Stormy Petrel: The Life Story of H.M.A.S. Sydney. Perth: Patersons. — HMAS Sydney

==== Germany ====
- Williamson, Gordon (2003). German Light Cruisers 1939–45. Oxford: Osprey Publishing. ISBN 978-1-84176-503-7.

==== Italy ====
- Stille, Mark (2018). Italian Cruisers of World War II. Oxford: Osprey Publishing. ISBN 978-1-4728-2535-3.

==== Japan ====
- Stille, Mark (2012). Imperial Japanese Navy Light Cruisers 1941–45. Oxford: Osprey Publishing. ISBN 978-1-84908-562-5.

==== New Zealand ====
- Harker, Jack S. (1971). Well done 'Leander'. Auckland: Collins. — HMNZS Leander
- Waters, S. D. (2008). HMNZS Leander. Wellington, NZ: Merriam Press. ISBN 978-1-4357-5892-6. — HMNZS Leander

==== United Kingdom ====
- Gordon, Edward (1985). HMS Pepperpot!: The Penelope in World War Two. London: Hale. — HMS Penelope
- Konstam, Angus (2012). British Light Cruisers 1939–45. Oxford: Osprey Publishing. ISBN 978-1-84908-684-4.
- Pearce, Frank (1975). The ship that torpedoed herself: HMS Trinidad. London: Collins. ISBN 0-904593-02-9. — HMS Trinidad
- Pearce, Frank (1982). Last Call for HMS Edinburgh. London: Collins. — HMS Edinburgh
- Sims, George (1972). H.M.S. Coventry, anti-aircraft cruiser. London: HMS Coventry Old Hands. — HMS Coventry

==== United States ====
- Morris, Colton G.; Cave, H. B. (1944). The fightin'est ship: the story of the cruiser Helena. New York: Dodd. — USS Helena
- Stille, Mark (2016). US Navy Light Cruisers 1941–45. Oxford: Osprey Publishing. ISBN 978-1-4728-1140-0.

=== Motor gunboats ===
==== United Kingdom ====
- Konstam, Angus (2010). British Motor Gun Boat 1939–45. Oxford: Osprey Publishing. ISBN 978-1-84908-077-4.

=== Sloops ===
==== Australia ====
- Parry, A. F. (1944). H.M.A.S. Yarra: The Story of a Gallant Ship. London: Angus & Robertson. — HMAS Yarra

=== Submarines ===
==== France ====
- L'Herminier, Jean (1953). Casablanca: The Secret Mission of a Famous Submarine. London: Muller.

==== Germany ====
- Williamson, Gordon (2002). Kriegsmarine U-boats 1939–45 (1). Oxford: Osprey Publishing. ISBN 978-1-84176-363-7.
- ———————— (2002). Kriegsmarine U-boats 1939–45 (2). Oxford: Osprey Publishing. ISBN 978-1-84176-364-4.

==== Japan ====
- Hashimoto, Moratsura (1946). Sunk: The Story of the Japanese Submarine Fleet, 1942–1945. New York: Holt.
- Stille, Mark (2007). Imperial Japanese Navy Submarines 1941–45. Oxford: Osprey Publishing. ISBN 978-1-84603-090-1.

==== United Kingdom ====
- Hart, Sydney (1956). Discharged Dead: A True Story of Britain's Submarines at War. London: Odhams.
- Lipscombe, Frank W. (1954). The British Submarine. London: Black.
- Mars, Alastair (1956). 'H.M.S. Thule' intercepts. London: Elek. — HMS Thule
- —————— (1971). British Submarines at War, 1939–1945. London: Kimber.
- McCarthey, Innes (2006). British Submarines 1939–45. Oxford: Osprey Publishing. ISBN 978-1-84603-007-9.
- Thomas, David A. (1961). Submarine Victory: The Story of British Submarines in World War II. London: Kimber.
- Trenowden, Ian (1974). The Hunting Submarine: The Fighting Life of H.M.S. Tally-Ho. London: Kimber. — HMS Tally-Ho
- Warren, C. E. T.; Benson, James (1958). 'The Admiralty regrets...': The Story of His Majesty's Submarines 'Thetis' and 'Thunderbolt'. London: Harrap. — HMS Thetis/Thunderbolt

==== United States ====
- Christley, Jim (2006). US Submarines 1941–45. Oxford: Osprey Publishing. ISBN 978-1-84176-859-5.
- Frank, Gerold; Horan, James D. (1945). U.S.S. Seawolf: Submarine Raider of the Pacific. New York: Putnam. — USS Seawolf
- Sheridan, Martin (1947). Overdue and Presumed Lost: The Story of the U.S.S. Bullhead. Francistown (NH/USA): Jones. — USS Bullhead

=== Torpedo boats ===
==== Germany ====
- Williamson, Gordon (2009). Kriegsmarine Coastal Forces. Oxford: Osprey Publishing. ISBN 978-1-84603-331-5.
- ———————— (2009). Kriegsmarine Auxiliary Cruisers. Oxford: Osprey Publishing. ISBN 978-1-84603-333-9.

==== Japan ====
- Stille, Mark (2017). Imperial Japanese Navy Antisubmarine Escorts 1941–45. Oxford: Osprey Publishing. ISBN 978-1-4728-1816-4.

==== United Kingdom ====
- Konstam, Angus (2003). British Motor Torpedo Boat 1939–45. Osprey Publishing. ISBN 978-1-84176-500-6.

==== United States ====
- Rottman, Gordon L. (2008). US Patrol Torpedo Boats. Oxford: Osprey Publishing. ISBN 978-1-84603-227-1.

== See also ==
- Bibliography of World War II
- Bibliography of World War II battles and campaigns in East Asia, South East Asia and the Pacific
- Bibliography of World War II battles and campaigns in Europe, North Africa and the Middle East
- List of ship classes of World War II
- List of ships of World War II
