= 8 Nëntori Publishing House =

Albanian publishing company

- Status: Defunct
- Founded: 1973; 52 years ago
- Country of origin: Albania

The 8 Nëntori (Albanian for '8 November') Publishing House was a publisher, created in 1973, in Tirana, Albania, and dedicated mainly to political and nonfictional publications.

== History ==
The name stems from the date of the foundation of the Party of Labour of Albania. The sector of translations of the Institute of History of the Party of Labour of Albania, created in 1955, had transferred into the Naim Frashëri Publishing House in 1965. 8 years later, in 1973 the 8 Nëntori Publishing House was created as a split from Naim Frashëri, which, starting in 1974, focused mostly on fictional literature.

The publishing house fully translated philosophic materials, mainly Marxist, which were up to then very little known in Albanian. The translators' work was thoroughly supervised by the Central Committee of the Party of Labour of Albania, as well as its related Institute of Studies on Marxism–Leninism. One of the first translators of the publisher was Sami Leka.
