= Bibliography of World War II battles and campaigns in Europe, North Africa and the Middle East =

This is a Bibliography of World War II battles and campaigns in Europe, North Africa and the Middle East. It aims to include the major theaters, campaigns and battles of the European theater of World War II. It is part of Wikipedia's larger effort to document the Bibliography of World War II. Its counterpart for the Asia-Pacific theater is the Bibliography of World War II battles and campaigns in East Asia, South East Asia and the Pacific.

== Bibliography ==
=== General history of the European theater ===
- Addison, Paul; Calder, Angus, eds. (1997). Time to Kill: The Soldier's Experience of War in the West, 1939–1945. London: Pimlico.
- Davies, Norman (2006). Europe at War 1939–1945: No Simple Victory. London: Macmillan.
- Nagorski, Andrew (2019). 1941: The Year German Lost the War. Simon & Schuster. ISBN 978-1-5011-8112-2.
- Perry, Marvin (2013). World War II in Europe: A Concise History. Boston: Wadsworth Publishing.
- Wilmot, Chester (1952). The Struggle for Europe. New York: Harper.

=== Invasion of Poland (1939) ===
- Böhler, Jochen (2006). Auftakt zum Vernichtungskrieg: Die Wehrmacht in Polen 1939 [Prelude to the War of Extermination: The Wehrmacht in Poland, 1939] (in German). Frankfurt am Main: Fischer Taschenbuch Verlag.
- Forczyk, Robert (2019). Case White: The Invasion of Poland. Osprey Publishing. ISBN 978-1-4728-3493-5.
- Kennedy, Robert M. (1956). The German Campaign in Poland. US Department of the Army. ISBN 978-1-57638-364-3.
- Kochanski, Halik (2012). The Eagle Unbowed: Poland and the Poles in the Second World War. Cambridge: Harvard University Press.
- Koskodan, Kenneth K. (2009). No Greater Ally: The Untold Story of Poland's Forces in World War II. Oxford: Osprey Publishing.
- Moorhouse, Roger (2019). First to Fight: The Polish War 1939. London: Bodely Head.
- ——— (2020). Poland 1939: The Outbreak of World War II. New York: Basic Books.
- Piekalkiewicz, Janusz (1982). Polenfeldzug: Hitler und Stalin zerschlagen die Polnische Republik [Poland Campaign: Hitler and Stalin smash the Polish Republic] (in German). Gustav Lübbe.
- Rossino, Alexander B. (2003). Hitler Strikes Poland: Blitzkrieg, Ideology, and Atrocity. Lawrence: University Press of Kansas. ISBN 978-0-7006-1234-5.
- Saunders, Alan (1984). Turning Points of World War II: The Invasion of Poland. Franklin Watts. ISBN 0-531-04864-0.
- Williamson, David G. (2009). Poland Betrayed: The Nazi-Soviet Invasions of 1939. Pen & Sword. ISBN 978-1-84415-926-0.
- Zaloga, Steven; Madej, Victory (1991). The Polish Campaign, 1939. New York: Hippocrene.
- ——— (2002). Poland 1939: The Birth of Blitzkrieg. Osprey Publishing. ISBN 1-84176-408-6.

=== Phony War (1939–1940) ===
==== Altmark incident (1940) ====
- British Foreign Office; Norwegian Legation (1950). Correspondence between H.M.'s Government in the U.K. and the Norwegian Government respecting the German steamer 'Altmark'. London: HMSO.
- Frischauer, Willi; Jackson, Robert (1955). 'The Navy's Here!': The Altmark Affair. London: Gollancz.

=== Baltic Sea campaigns (1939–1945) ===
- Grier, Howard D. (2007). Hitler, Dönitz, and the Baltic Sea: The Third Reich's Last Hope, 1944–1945. Annapolis: U.S. Naval Institute Press.

=== Battle of the Atlantic and Arctic Oceans (1939–1945) ===
- Dimbleby, Jonathan (2016). The Battle of the Atlantic: How the Allies Won the War. Oxford and New York: Oxford University Press.
- Liversidge, Douglas (1960). The Third Front: The Strange Story of the Secret War in the Arctic. London: Souvenir.
- Pope, Dudley (1968). 73 North: The Battle of the Barents Sea. London: Weidenfeld & Nicolson.

=== Winter War (1939–1940) ===
- Edwards, Robert (2008). The Winter War: Russia's Invasion of Finland, 1939–1940. New York: Pegasus.
- Murphy, David E. (2021). The Finnish-Soviet Winter War 1939–40: Stalin's Hollow Victory. Osprey Publishing. ISBN 978-1-4728-4397-5.
- Semiryaga, Mikhail (1990). The Winter War: Looking Back after Fifty Years. Moscow: Novosti.
- Trotter, William R. (1991). A Frozen Hell: The Russo-Finnish Winter War of 1939–40. New York: Algonquin.
- Van Dyke, Carl (1997). The Soviet Invasion of Finland, 1939–1940. London: Frank Cass.

=== Operation Weserübung (1940) ===
- Derry, T. K. (1952). The Campaign in Norway. London, H.M. Stationary Off.
- Elting, John R. (1981). Battles for Scandinavia. Time-Life Books. ISBN 0-8094-3397-4.
- Evans, Mark L. (1999). Great World War II Battles in the Arctic. Westport, Connecticut: Greenwood Publishing Group.
- Greentree, David (2022). Narvik 1940: The Battle for Northern Norway. Osprey Publishing. ISBN 978-1-4728-4911-3.
- Haarr, Geirr (2009). The German Invasion of Norway. Annapolis, Maryland: Naval Institute Press.
- Heimark, Brice (1994). The OSS Norwegian Special Operations Group in World War II. Westport, Connecticut: Praeger.
- Kiszely, John (2017). Anatomy of a Campaign: The British Fiasco in Norway, 1940. Cambridge University Press. ISBN 978-1-107-19459-5.
- Lunde, Henrik (2009). Hitler's Pre-Emptive War: The Battle for Norway, 1940. Drexel Hill, Pennsylvania: Casemate.
- Mann, Chris; Jorgensen, Christer (2003). Arctic War. New York: St. Martins Press. ISBN 978-0-312-31100-1.
- Petrow, Richard (1974). The Bitter Years: The Invasion and Occupation of Denmark and Norway, April 1940–May 1945. New York: Morrow. ISBN 978-0-688-00275-6.
- Riste, Olav (1966). "War comes to Norway". In Andenæs, Johannes; Riste, Olav; Skodvin, Magne (eds.). Norway and the Second World War. Oslo: Johan Grundt Tanum Förlag. OCLC 802925743.

=== Western Campaign (1940) ===
- Beaufre, André (1967). The Fall of France. London: Cassell.
- Bloch, Marc (1968) [1946]. Strange Defeat. New York: W.W. Norton & Co.
- Cole, Hugh M. (1950). The Lorraine Campaign: The European Theater of Operations Series. Washington, D.C.: Department of the Army.
- Deighton, Len (1979). Blitzkrieg: From the Rise of Hitler to the Fall of Dunkirk. London: Jonathan Cape.
- Horne, Alistair (1969). To Lose a Battle: France 1940. Boston: Little Brown.
- Porch, Douglas (2022). Defeat and Division: France at War, 1939–1942. Cambridge: Cambridge University Press.
- Sebag-Montefiore, Hugh (2006). Dunkirk: Fight to the Last Man. Cambridge, Massachusetts: Harvard University Press.
- Shepperd, Alan (1996). France 1940: Blitzkrieg in the West. Osprey Military.
- Shirer, William L (1969). The Collapse of the Third Republic: An Inquiry into the Fall of France in 1940. New York: Simon & Schuster.

=== East African campaign (1940–1941) ===
- Ellsberg, Edward (1946). Under the Red Sea Sun. New York: Dodd, Mead & Company.
- MacDonald, John Forrest (1957). Abyssinian Adventure. Cassell.
- Steer, George L. (1942). Sealed and Delivered: a Book on the Abyssinian Campaign. London: Hodder & Stoughton.

=== Battle of the Mediterranean (1940–1945) ===
- Howard, Michael (1993). The Mediterranean Strategy in the Second World War. London: Greenhill Books.
- Morison, Samuel Eliot (2001). Operations in North African Waters: October 1942–June 1943. New York: Book Sales.
- O'Hara, Vincent (2009). Struggle for the Middle Sea: The Great Navies at War in the Mediterranean Theater, 1940–1945. Annapolis: Naval Institute Press.

==== Battle of Cape Matapan (March 1941) ====
- Pack, Stanley W. C. (1961). The Battle of Matapan. London: Batsford.
- ——— (1972). Night Action off Cape Matapan. London: Allan.
- Seth, Ronald (1960). Two Fleets surprised: the Story of the Battle of Cape Matapan, Mediterranean, March, 1941. London: Bles.

=== North African campaign (1940–1943) ===
- Atkinson, Rick (2002). An Army at Dawn: The War in North Africa, 1942–1943. New York: Henry Holt & Co.
- Barnett, Correlli (1960). The Desert Generals. London: George, Allen & Unwin.
- Barr, Niall (2006). The Pendulum of War: The Three Battles of El-Alamein. London: Overlook Press.
- Bradford, George (1974). Armour Camouflage and Markings, North Africa 1940–1943. London: Arms & Armour.
- Chamberlain, Peter; Ellis, Chris (1971). Afrika Korps: German Military Operations in the Western Desert. Edgware (Middlesex, UK): Almark.
- Ellis, Chris (2001). 21st Panzer Division: Rommel's Afrika Korps Spearhead. Ian Allan Publishing. ISBN 978-0-7110-2853-1.
- Kitchen, Martin (2009). Rommel's Desert War: Waging World War II in North Africa, 1941–1943. Cambridge and New York: Cambridge University Press.
- Latimer, Jon (2002). Alamein. Cambridge, Massachusetts: Harvard University Press.
- Lewin, Ronald (1977). The Life and Death of the Afrika Korps. New York: Quadrangle. ISBN 978-0-8129-0682-0.
- Levine, Alan J. (1999). The War Against Rommel's Supply Lines, 1942–1943. Westport, Connecticut: Praeger Publishers.
- Macksey, Kenneth J. (1968). Africa Korps. New York: Ballantine.
- Moorhead, Alan; Keegan, John (2001). Desert War: The North African Campaign, 1940–1943. New York: Penguin.
- Morison, Samuel Eliot (2001). Operations in North African Waters: October 1942–June 1943. New York: Book Sales.
- Spielberger, Walter J.; Feist, Uwe (1968). Armor in the Western Desert. Fallbrook (CA/USA): Aero.

=== Siege of Malta (1940–1942) ===
- Castillo, Dennis A. (2006). The Maltese Cross: A Strategic History of Malta. Greenwood Press. ISBN 978-0-313-32329-4.
- Jellison, Charles A. (1985). Besieged: The World War II Ordeal of Malta, 1940–1942. Lebanon, New Hampshire: University Press of New England.
- Rogers, Anthony (2022). Battle of Malta: June 1940–November 1942. Osprey Publishing. ISBN 978-1-4728-4890-1.

=== Battle of Britain (1940) ===
- Addison, Paul; Craig, Jeremy, eds. (2010). Listening to Britain: Home Intelligence Reports on Britain's Finest Hour, May to September 1940. London: Bodley Head.
- Bishop, Edward (1960). The Battle of Britain. London: Allen & Unwin.
- ——— (1968). Their Finest Hour: The Story of the Battle of Britain, 1940. New York: Ballantine.
- Bishop, Patrick (2004). Fighter Boys: Saving Britain, 1940. London: Harper Perennial. ISBN 978-0-00-257169-2.
- Boorman, Henry; Long, Howard (1965). Recalling the Battle of Britain: A Photographic Essay based upon the records of the 'Kent Messenger' and other contemporary sources of World War 2. Kent Publisher.
- Clark, Ronald W. (1965). Battle for Britain: Sixteen Weeks that changed the Course of History. London: Harrap.
- ———; et al. (1969). The Hundred Days that shook the world. Hemel Hempstead (Hertfordshire): Christopher Marlowe.
- Collier, Basil (1962). The Battle of Britain. London: Batsford.
- Collier, Richard (1966). Eagle Day: The Battle of Britain, August 6 – September 14, 1940. London: Hodder & Stoughton.
- Deighton, Len (1977). Fighter: The True Story of the Battle of Britain. London: Jonathan Cape.
- Hobbs, Anthony (1973). The Battle of Britain. London: Wayland.
- Holland, James (2012). The Battle of Britain: Five Months That Changed History, May–October 1940. New York: St. Martin's Griffin. ISBN 978-0-14-133220-8.
- Hough, Richard (1971). The Battle of Britain: The Triumph of R.A.F. Fighter Pilots. New York: Macmillan.
- Howard-Williams, Ernest L. (1947). Immortal Memory: Drafted during the Battle of Britain from the Combat Reports of those who took part. London: Bamber.
- Hutchinson, Tom (1969). 'The Battle of Britain': A True Story of those dramatic Four Months in 1940. London: Purnell.
- Jullian, Marcel (1967). The Battle of Britain, July–September, 1940. London: Cape.
- Masters, David (1941). So Few: The Immortal Record of the Royal Air Force. London: Eyre & Spottiswoode.
- McKee, Alexander (1960). Strike from the Sky: The Story of the Battle of Britain. London: Souvenir.
- Middleton, Drew (1960). The sky suspended: the Battle of Britain. London: Secker & Warburg.
- Morgan, David; Evans, Mary (1993). The Battle for Britain: Citizenship and Ideology in the Second World War. New York: Routledge.
- Narracott, Arthur H. (1947). In praise of the few: a Battle of Britain anthology. London: Muller.
- Overy, Richard (2002). The Battle of Britain: The Myth and the Reality. New York: W. W. Norton & Company. ISBN 978-0-393-02008-3.
- Reynolds, Quentin J. (1953). All about the Battle of Britain. New York: Random House.
- Todman, Daniel (2016). Britain's War: Into Battle, 1937–1941. Oxford and New York: Oxford University Press.
- Wood, Derek; Dempster, Derek (1961). The Narrow Margin: The Battle of Britain and the Rise of Air Power, 1939–40. London: Hutchinson.

=== Balkans campaign (1940–1941) ===
- Battistelli, Pier Paolo (2021). The Balkans 1940–41 (1): Mussolini's Fatal Blunder in the Greco-Italian War. Osprey Publishing. ISBN 978-1-4728-4258-9.
- ——— (2021). The Balkans 1940–41 (2): Hitlers Blitzkrieg against Yugoslavia and Greece. Osprey Publishing. ISBN 978-1-4728-4262-6.
- Beevor, Antony (1991). Crete: The Battle and the Resistance. London: John Murray.

=== Anglo-Iraqi War (1941) ===
- Broich, John (2019). Blood, Oil, and the Axis: The Allied Resistance against a Fascist State in Iraq and the Levant, 1941. Abrams Press.
- Dudgeon, Anthony (2000). Hidden Victory: The Battle of Habbaniya, May 1941. Stroud and Charleston: Tempus Publishing. ISBN 0-7524-2001-1.
- James, Barrie G. (2009). Hitler's Gulf War, The Fight for Iraq 1941. Barnsley: Pen & Sword Aviation. ISBN 978-1-84884-090-4.
- Lyman, Robert (2006). Iraq 1941: The battles of Basra, Habbaniya, Fallujah and Baghdad. Osprey Publishing. ISBN 1-84176-991-6.
- Tarbush, Mohammad (1982). The Role of the Military in Politics: A case study of Iraq to 1941. Routledge. ISBN 978-1-138-92582-3.
- Warner, Geoffrey (1979). Iraq and Syria 1941. Newark, New Jersey: University of Delaware Press.

=== Syria-Lebanon campaign (1941) ===
- Bou-Nacklie, N. E. (1994). "The 1941 Invasion of Syria and Lebanon: The Role of the Local Paramilitary". Middle Eastern Studies. 30 (3): 512–529. doi:10.1080/00263209408701009. JSTOR 4283655.
- Nordbruch, Goetz (2009). Nazism in Lebanon and Syria: The Ambivalence of the German Option, 1933–1945. London: Routledge.
- Zamir, Meir (2005). "An Intimate Alliance: The Joint Struggle of General Edward Spears and Riad Al-Sulh to Oust France from Lebanon, 1942–1944". Middle Eastern Studies. 41 (6): 811–832. doi:10.1080/00263200500296577. JSTOR 4284410.

=== Eastern Front (1941–1945) ===
==== General ====
- Baker, Lee (2009). The Second World War on the Eastern Front. London: Pearson Longman.
- Bartov, Omer (1986). The Eastern Front 1941–1945: The Barbarisation of Warfare. New York: St. Martin's Press.
- Buttar, Prit (2018). On a Knife's Edge: The Ukraine, November 1942–March 1943. Osprey Publishing.
- ——— (2019). Retribution: The Soviet Reconquest of Central Ukraine, 1943. Osprey Publishing.
- ——— (2020). The Reckoning: The Defeat of Army Group South, 1944. Osprey Publishing.
- ——— (2022). Meat Grinder: The Battles for the Rzhev Salient, 1942–43. Osprey Publishing.
- Fritz, Stephen G. (1995). Frontsoldaten: The German Soldier in World War II. Lexington: The University Press of Kentucky.
- ——— (2011). Ostkrieg: Hitler's War of Extermination in the East. Lexington: The University Press of Kentucky.
- Glantz, David M.; House, Jonathan (1995). When Titans Clashed: How the Red Army Stopped Hitler. Lawrence, Kansas: University Press of Kansas.
- Hartmann, Christian (2013). Operation Barbarossa: Germany's War in the East, 1941–1945. Oxford and New York: Oxford University Press.
- Hill, Alexander (2016). The Red Army and the Second World War. UK: Cambridge University Press.
- Mawdsley, Evan (2005). Thunder in the East: The Nazi-Soviet War, 1941–1945. London: Hodder Arnold.
- McMeekin, Sean (2021). Stalin's War: A New History of World War II. New York: Basic Books.
- Müller, Rolf-Dieter; Ueberschär, Gerd R. (1997). Hitler's War in the East, 1941–1945: A Critical Assessment. Oxford: Berghahn.
- Seaton, Albert (1971). The Russo-German War, 1941–1945. London: Arthur Barker.
- Stahel, David (2009). Operation Barbarossa and Germany's Defeat in the East. Cambridge and New York: Cambridge University Press.
- ——— (2011). Kiev 1941: Hitler's Battle for Supremacy in the East. Cambridge and New York: Cambridge University Press.
- Ziemke, Earl F. (1968). Stalingrad to Berlin: The German Defeat in the East. Washington, D.C.: Office of the Chief of Military History, U.S. Army.
- ———; Bauer, Magna E. (1987). Moscow to Stalingrad: Decision in the East. Washington, D.C.: Center of Military History, U.S. Army.

==== Arctic operations and Continuation War (1941–1944) ====
- Gebhardt, James F. (1990). The Petsamo-Kirkenes Operation: Soviet Breakthrough and Pursuit in the Arctic, October 1944 (PDF). Leavenworth Papers Number 17. Leavenworth, Kansas: Combat Studies Institute, US Army Command and General Staff College. ISSN 0195-3451. Archived from the original (PDF) on September 16, 2012.
- Mann, Chris M.; Jörgensen, Christer (2002). Hitler's Arctic War. Hersham, UK: Ian Allan. ISBN 0-7110-2899-0.
- Nenye, Vesa; Munter, Peter; Wirtanen, Tony; Birks, Chris (2016). Finland at War: The Continuation and Lapland Wars 1941–45. Osprey. ISBN 978-1-4728-1526-2.

==== Operation Barbarossa (1941) ====
- Boog, Horst; et al. (1998). Osers, Ewald (ed.). The Attack on the Soviet Union. Germany and the Second World War. Vol. IV. Oxford: Clarendon. ISBN 978-0-19-822886-8. LCCN 99223914. OL 106342M.
- Dimbleby, Johnathan (2021). Operation Barbarossa: The History of a Cataclysm. Oxford University Press.
- Erickson, John (1984). The Road to Stalingrad: Stalin's War with Germany. Vol. 1. Boulder, Colorado: Westview Press.
- Megargee, Geoffrey P. (2006). War of Annihilation: Combat and Genocide on the Eastern Front, 1941. Lanham, Maryland: Rowman & Littlefield.

==== First Battle of Kiev (1941) ====
- Stahel, David (2011). Kiev 1941: Hitler's Battle for Supremacy in the East. Cambridge: Cambridge University Press.

==== Crimean campaign (1941–42) ====
- Forczyk, Robert (2014). Where Iron Crosses Grow: The Crimea 1941–44. Oxford: Osprey Publishing.

==== Operation Typhoon and Battle of Moscow (1941) ====
- Braithwaite, Rodric (2006). Moscow 1941: A City and Its People At War. New York: Alfred A. Knopf.
- Reinhardt, Klaus (1992). Moscow: The Turning Point. Oxford: Berg.
- Stahel, David (2013). Operation Typhoon. Hitler's March on Moscow. Cambridge: Cambridge University Press.

==== Siege of Leningrad (1941–44) ====
- Barber, John; Dzeniskevich, A. R., eds. (2005). Life and Death in Besieged Leningrad, 1941–1944. Basingstoke, UK: Palgrave.
- Forczyk, Robert (2009). Leningrad 1941–44: The Epic Siege. Oxford: Osprey Publishing.
- Glantz, David M. (2002). The Battle for Leningrad, 1941–1944. Lawrence: University Press of Kansas. ISBN 978-0-7006-1208-6.
- Reid, Anna (2012). Leningrad: The Epic Siege of World War II, 1941–1944. New York: Walker & Co.
- Salisbury, Harrison E. (1969). The 900 Days: The Siege of Leningrad. London: Pan. ISBN 978-0-06-013732-8.

==== Winter campaigns (1941/42) ====
- Stahel, David (2019). Retreat from Moscow: A New History of Germany's Winter Campaign, 1941–1942. New York: Farrar, Straus and Giroux.

==== Second Battle of Kharkov (1942) ====
- Glantz, David M. (1998). Kharkov 1942: Anatomy of a Military Disaster. Sarpedon. ISBN 978-1-885119-54-4.

==== Case Blue (1942) ====
- Citino, Robert M. (2007). Death of the Wehrmacht: The German Campaigns of 1942. Lawrence: University Press of Kansas. ISBN 978-0-7006-1531-5.

==== Battle of the Caucasus (1942–44) ====
- Statiev, Alexander (2018). At War's Summit: The Red Army and the Struggle for the Caucasus Mountains in World War II. Cambridge: Cambridge University Press.

==== Battle of Stalingrad (1942/43) ====
- Beevor, Antony (1998). Stalingrad: The Fateful Siege, 1942–1943. London: Viking.
- Craig, William (1973). Enemy at the Gates: The Battle for Stalingrad. New York: Penguin Books.
- Einsiedel, Heinrich Graf von; Wieder, Joachim (1998). Stalingrad: Memories and Reassessments. New York: Sterling Publishing.
- Forczyk, Robert (2021). Stalingrad 1942–43 (1): The German Advance to the Volga. Osprey Publishing. ISBN 978-1-4728-4265-7.
- ——— (2021). Stalingrad 1942–43 (2): The Fight for the City. Osprey Publishing. ISBN 978-1-4728-4269-5.
- Glantz, David M.; House, Jonathan (2009). To the Gates of Stalingrad: Soviet–German Combat Operations April to August 1942. Lawrence: University Press of Kansas.
- ———; ——— (2009). Armageddon in Stalingrad: September to November 1942. Lawrence: University Press of Kansas.
- Hayward, Joel (1998). Stopped at Stalingrad: The Luftwaffe and Hitler's Defeat in the East, 1942–1943. Lawrence, Kansas: University Press of Kansas.
- Hellbeck, Jochen (2015). Stalingrad: The City That Defeated The Third Reich. New York: PublicAffairs.
- Jones, Michael K. (2007). Stalingrad: How the Red Army Survived the German Onslaught. Drexel Hill, Pennsylvania: Casemate.
- Kehrig, Manfred (1974). Stalingrad. Stuttgart: Deutsche Verlags Anstalt.
- Roberts, Geoffrey (2002). Victory at Stalingrad: The Battle that Changed History. New York: Longman.

==== Winter campaigns (1942/43) ====
- Glantz, David M. (2011). After Stalingrad: The Red Army's Winter Offensive 1942–1943. Oxford: Helion and Company.

==== Operation Citadel and Battle of Kursk (1943) ====
- Bergstrom, Christer (2007). Kursk: The Air Battle, July 1943. Hersham, UK: Classic Publications.
- Bußmann, Walter (1993). "Kursk-Orel-Dnjepr. Erlebnisse und Erfahrungen im Stab des XXXXVI. Panzerkorps während des Unternehmens Zitadelle" [Kursk-Orel-Dnieper. Experiences in the Staff of XXXXVI Panzer Corps during Operation Citadel]. Vierteljahrshefte für Zeitgeschichte (in German). Oldenbourg.
- Glantz, David M.; House, Jonathan (1999). The Battle of Kursk. Lawrence: University Press of Kansas.
- Healy, Mark (1993). Kursk 1943: The Tide Turns in the East. Osprey Military. ISBN 1-85532-211-0.
- ——— (2008). Zitadelle: The German Offensive Against the Kursk Salient 4–17 July 1943. The History Press.
- Zetterling, Niklas; Frankson, Anders (2000). Kursk 1943: A Statistical Analysis. London: Frank Cass.

==== Operation Bagration (1944) ====
- Adair, Paul (1994). Hitler's Greatest Defeat: The Collapse of Army Group Centre, June 1944. London: Arms and Armour.
- Dunn, Walter S. (2000). Soviet Blitzkrieg: The Battle for White Russia, 1944. Boulder, Colorado: Lynne Rienner.
- Glantz, David M. (2007). Red Storm over the Balkans: The Failed Soviet Invasion of Romania, Spring 1944. Lawrence: University Press of Kansas.
- Hinze, Rolf (1980). Der Zusammenbruch der Heeresgruppe Mitte im Osten 1944 [The Collapse of Army Group Center in the East 1944] (in German). Motorbuch Verlag. ISBN 3-87943-681-9.
- Niepold, Gerd (1987). Battle for White Russia: The Destruction of Army Group Center, June 1944. London: Brassey's Defense Publishers.
- Zaloga, Steven J. (1996). Bagration 1944: The Destruction of Army Group Centre. Osprey Publishing. ISBN 1-85532-478-4.

==== Baltic Offensive (1944) ====
- Baxter, Ian (2009). Battle in the Baltics 1944–45: The Fighting for Latvia, Lithuania and Estonia. A Photographic History. Helion and Company. ISBN 978-1-906033-33-0.
- Buttar, Prit (2013). Between Giants: The Battle for the Baltics in World War II. Osprey Publishing.

==== Siege of Budapest (1944–45) ====
- Ungvary, Krisztian (2005). The Siege of Budapest: One Hundred Days in World War II. New Haven and London: Yale University Press.

==== Soviet conquest of Germany (1945) ====
- Buttar, Prit (2010). Battleground Prussia: The Assault on Germany's Eastern Front 1944-45. Osprey Publishing.
- Duffy, Christopher (1993). Red Storm on the Reich: The Soviet March on Germany, 1945. New York: Da Capo Press.
- Hastings, Max (2004). Armageddon: The Battle for Germany, 1944–1945. New York: Alfred A. Knopf.
- Meier-Welcker, Hans, ed. (1963). Abwehrkämpfe am Nordflügel der Ostfront 1944–1945 [Defensive Battles at the Northern Flank of the Eastern Front 1944–1945] (in German). Stuttgart: Deutsche Verlags-Anstalt.

==== Battle of Berlin (1945) ====
- Beevor, Antony (2002). The Fall of Berlin, 1945. New York: Viking.
- Ryan, Cornelius (1966). The Last Battle. London: Collins.

=== Anglo-Soviet invasion of Iran (1941) ===
- Eshraghi, F. (1984). "Anglo-Soviet Occupation of Iran in August 1941". Middle Eastern Studies. 20 (1): 27–52. doi:10.1080/00263208408700570. JSTOR 4282976.
- ——— (1984). "The Immediate Aftermath of Anglo-Soviet Occupation of Iran in August 1941". Middle Eastern Studies. 20 (3): 324–351. doi:10.1080/00263208408700588. JSTOR 4283013.

=== Italian campaign (1943–1945) ===
- Agarossi, Elena (2000). A Nation Collapses: The Italian Surrender of 1943. Translated by Fergusson, Harvey II. Cambridge, UK: Cambridge University Press.
- Atkinson, Rick (2007). The Day of Battle: The War in Sicily and Italy, 1943–1944. New York: Henry Holt & Co. ISBN 978-0-8050-6289-2.
- Ellwood, David (1985). Italy, 1943–1945. New York: Holmes and Meier.
- Lamb, Richard (1993). War in Italy 1943–1945: A Brutal Story. New York: St. Martin's. ISBN 978-0-312-11093-2.

==== Battle of Monte Cassino (January–May 1944) ====
- Bohmler, Rudolf (1964). Monte Cassino. London: Cassell.
- Bond, Harold L. (1964). Return to Cassino: A Memoir of the Fight for Rome. London: Dent.
- Connell, Charles (1963). Monte Cassino: The Historic Battle. London: Elek.
- Graham, Dominick (1971). Cassino. New York: Ballantine.
- Majdalany, Fred (1945). The Monastery. London: Lane.
- ——— (1957). Cassino: Portrait of a Battle. London: Longmans Green.

==== Battle of Anzio (January–June 1944) ====
- Blumenson, Martin (1963). Anzio: The Gamble that Failed. London: Weidenfeld & Nicolson.
- Turbett, Colin (2021). Anzio 1944: The Beleaguered Beachhead. Pen & Sword. ISBN 978-1-5267-7659-4.
- Fehrenbach, T. R. (1962). The Battle of Anzio: The Dramatic Story of one of the Major Engagements of World War II. Derby (CT/USA): Monarch Books.
- Harr, Bill (1952). Combat Boots: Tales of Fighting Men including the Anzio Derby. New York: Exposition.
- Hibbert, Christopher (1970). Anzio: Bid for Rome. New York: Ballantine.
- Sheehan, Fred (1970). Anzio, Epic of Bravery. New York: Ballantine.
- Trevelyan, Raleigh (1956). The Fortress: A Diary of Anzio and after. London: Collins.
- U.S. Government Printing Office (1948). Anzio Beachhead, 22 January – 25 May 1944. Washington DC: USGPO.
- Vaughan-Thomas, Wynford (1961). Anzio. London: Longmans Green.

=== Dodecanese campaign (1943) ===
- Rogers, Anthony (2019). Kos and Leros 1943: The German Conquest of the Dodecanese. Osprey Publishing. ISBN 978-1-4728-3509-3.

=== Western Front (1944–1945) ===
==== General ====
- Ambrose, Stephen (1997). Citizen Soldiers: The U.S. Army from the Normandy Beaches to the Bulge to the Surrender of Germany. New York: Simon & Schuster.
- Atkinson, Rick (2013). The Guns at Last Light: The War in Western Europe, 1944–1945. New York: Henry Holt & Co. ISBN 978-0-8050-6290-8.
- Balkokski, Joseph (1999). Beyond the Beachhead: The 29th Infantry Division in Normandy. Mechanicsburg, Penn.: Stackpole Books.
- Blumenson, Martin (1963). The Duel for France, 1944. Boston: Houghton Mifflin.
- Levine, Alan J. (2000). From the Normandy Beaches To The Baltic Sea: The Northwest Europe Campaign, 1944–1945. Westport, Connecticut: Praeger.
- Mitcham, Samuel W. Jr. (1997). The Desert Fox in Normandy: Rommel's Defense of Fortress Europe. Westport, Connecticut: Praeger.
- Porch, Douglas (2024). Resistance and Liberation: France at War, 1942-1945. Cambridge: Cambridge University Press.

==== Normandy landings, Battle of Normandy (1944) ====
- Ambrose, Stephen (1994). D-Day, June 6, 1944: The Climactic Battle of World War II. New York: Simon & Schuster.
- ——— (1985). Pegasus Bridge: June 6, 1944. New York: Simon & Schuster.
- Bédarida, François, ed. (1987). Normandie 44, du débarquement à la libération [Normandy 44: Landing to the Liberation] (in French). Paris: A. Michel.
- Beevor, Antony (2009). D-Day: The Battle for Normandy. London: Penguin.
- Belfield, Eversley; Essame, Hubert (1965). The Battle for Normandy. Philadelphia: Dufour Editions.
- Bennett, Ralph Francis (1980). Ultra in the West: the Normandy Campaign, 1944–45. New York: C. Scribner's Sons.
- Blumenson, Martin (1961). Breakout and Pursuit. Washington, D.C.: Office of the Chief of Military History, Dept. of the Army.
- Caddick-Adams, P. (2019). Sand and Steel: The D-Day Invasion and the Liberation of France. Oxford University Press.
- Ford, Ken (2002). D-Day 1944 (3): Sword Beach & the British Airborne Landings. Oxford: Osprey Publishing. ISBN 1-84176-366-7.
- ——— (2002). D-Day 1944 (4): Gold & Juno Beaches. Oxford: Osprey Publishing. ISBN 1-84176-368-3.
- Hart, Russell A. (2001). Clash of Arms: How the Allies Won in Normandy. Norman: University of Oklahoma Press.
- Hastings, Max (1984). Overlord: D-Day and the Battle for Normandy. New York: Simon and Schuster.
- Keegan, John (1994). Six Armies in Normandy. New York: Penguin Books. ISBN 978-0-14-023542-5.
- Piekalkiewicz, Janusz (1998). Die Invasion: Frankreich 1944 [The Invasion: France 1944] (in German). Bechtermünz Verlag. ISBN 3-8289-0279-0.
- Ryan, Cornelius (1959). The Longest Day. New York: Simon & Schuster.
- Zaloga, Steven J. (2003). D-Day 1944 (1): Omaha Beach. Oxford: Osprey Publishing. ISBN 1-84176-367-5.
- ——— (2004). D-Day 1944 (2): Utah Beach & the US Airborne Landings. Oxford: Osprey Publishing. ISBN 978-1-78200-147-8.

==== Falaise Pocket (1944) ====
- Blumenson, Martin (1993). The Battle of the Generals: The Untold Story of the Falaise Pocket – The Campaign That Should Have Won World War II. New York: William Morrow & Co. ISBN 978-0-688-11837-2.

==== Operation Market Garden (1944) ====
- Badsey, Stephen (1993). Arnhem 1944: Operation 'Market Garden'. Osprey Publishing. ISBN 1-85532-302-8.
- Farrar-Hockley, Anthony (1970). Airborne Carpet: Operation Market Garden. London: Macdonald.
- Ryan, Cornelius (1995). A Bridge Too Far: The Classic History of the Greatest Airborne Battle of World War II. New York: Simon and Schuster.

===== Battle of Arnhem (1944) =====
- Bauer, Cornelis (1966). The Battle of Arnhem: The Betrayal Myth Refuted. London: Hodder & Stoughton.
- Beevor, Antony (2018). The Battle of Arnhem: The Deadliest Airborne Operation of World War II. New York: Viking.
- Gibson, Ronald (1956). Nine Days (17–25th September, 1944). Ilfracombe (Devonshire): Stockwell.
- Hagen, Louis (1945). Arnhem Lift: The Diary of a Glider Pilot. London: Pilot.
- Heaps, Leo (1945). Escape from Arnhem: A Canadian among the lost Paratroops. London: Macmillan.
- Hibbert, Christopher (1962). The Battle of Arnhem. London: Batsford.
- Horst, Kate A. ten. (1959). Cloud over Arnhem: September 17th–26th, 1944. London: Wingate.
- Mackenzie, Charles B. (1956). It was like this!: A Short Factual Account of the Battle of Arnhem and Oosterbeck (2nd ed.). London: Bailey & Swinfen.
- Piekalkiewicz, Janusz (1998). Arnheim 1944: Die größte Luftlandeoperation [Arnhem 1944: The Largest Airborne Operation] (in German). Bechtermünz Verlag. ISBN 3-8289-0278-2.
- Swiecicki, Marek (1945). With the Red Devils at Arnhem. London: Max Love.
- Urquhart, Robert E. (1958). Arnhem. London: Cassell.
- Whiting, Charles (1974). A Bridge at Arnhem. London: Futura.

==== Battle of the Bulge / Ardennes Offensive (1944–45) ====
- Beevor, Antony (2015). Ardennes 1944: Battle of the Bulge. London: Viking.
- Caddick-Adams, P. (2014). Snow and Steel: The Battle of the Bulge, 1944–45. Oxford University Press.
- Cole, Hugh M. (1965). The Ardennes: Battle of the Bulge. Washington DC: U.S. Department of the Army.
- Davis, Franklin M. (1961). Breakthrough: The Epic Story of the Battle of the Bulge. Derby (CT/USA): Monarch.
- Draper, Theodore (1956). The 84th Infantry Division in the Battle of the Ardennes. New York: Viking.
- Eisenhower, John S. D. (1969). The Bitter Woods: The Dramatic Story of Hitler's Surprise Offensive. New York: Putnam.
- Elstob, Peter (1971). Hitler's Last Offensive. London: Secker & Warburg.
- Kershaw, Alex (2004). The Longest Winter: The Battle of the Bulge and the Epic Story of World War II's Most Decorated Platoon. Boston: Da Capo Press.
- Merriam, Robert E. (1947). Dark December: The Full Account of the Battle of the Bulge. Chicago: Ziff-Davis.
- Nobecourt, Jacques (1967). Hitler's Last Gamble: The Battle of the Ardennes. London: Chatto & Windus.
- Strawson, John (1972). The Battle of the Ardennes. London: Bastford.
- Toland, John (1960). Battle: The Story of the Bulge. London: Muller.

===== Malmedy Massacre (1944) =====
- Gallagher, Richard (1964). The Malmedy Massacre. New York: Paperback Library.
- Whiting, Charles (1971). Massacre at Malmedy: The Story of Jochen Peiper's Battle Group, Ardennes, December 1944. London: Cooper.

===== Siege of Bastogne (1944) =====
- Elstob, Peter (1968). Bastogne: The Road Block. New York: Ballantine.
- Marshall, Samuel L. A. (1946). Bastogne: The story of the first eight days in which the 101st Airborne Division was closed within the ring of German forces. Washington DC: Infantry Journal.

===== Western Allied conquest of Germany (1945) =====
- Caddick-Adams, P. (2022). Fire and Steel: The End of World War Two in the West. Oxford University Press.
- Euler, Helmuth (1995). Entscheidung an Rhein und Ruhr 1945 [Decision at Rhine and Ruhr 1945] (in German). Motorbuch Verlag. ISBN 3-87943-728-9.
- Harding, Stephen (2013). The Last Battle: When U.S. and German Soldiers Joined Forces in the Waning Hours of World War II in Europe. Boston: Da Capo Press.
- Hastings, Max (2004). Armageddon: The Battle for Germany, 1944–1945. New York: Alfred A. Knopf.

=== Warsaw Uprising (1944) ===
- Davies, Norman (2003). Rising '44. New York: Macmillan.

== See also ==
- Bibliography of Adolf Hitler
- Bibliography of The Holocaust
  - Bibliography of the Holocaust in Greece
- Bibliography of World War II
- Bibliography of World War II battles and campaigns in East Asia, South East Asia and the Pacific
