= Bibliography of the Holocaust in Greece =

This is a list of selected papers or books about the Holocaust in Greece.

== List ==
- Abatzopoulou, Fragiski (2015). "Griechische Juden und ihre Verfolgung als Thema der griechischen Literatur". Die Okkupation Griechenlands im Zweiten Weltkrieg: Griechische und deutsche Erinnerungskultur (in German). Böhlau Verlag Köln Weimar. pp. 233–252. ISBN 978-3-412-22467-7.
- Aly, Götz (2004). "Die Bekämpfung der Inflation in Griechenland und die Deportation der Juden von Saloniki". Österreichische Zeitschrift für Geschichtswissenschaften. 15 (2): 7–30. doi:10.25365/oezg-2004-15-2-2.
- Antoniou, Giorgos; Moses, A. Dirk (2018). "Introduction". The Holocaust in Greece. Cambridge University Press. pp. 1–12. ISBN 978-1-108-47467-2.
- Apostolou, Andrew (2000). ""The Exception of Salonika": Bystanders and collaborators in Northern Greece". Holocaust and Genocide Studies. 14 (2): 165–196. doi:10.1093/hgs/14.2.165.
- Apostolou, Andrew (2010). "Strategies of evasion: Avoiding the issue of collaboration and indifference during the Holocaust in Greece". Collaboration with the Nazis. Routledge. ISBN 978-0-203-85171-5.
- Apostolou, Andrew (2007). 'The exception of Salonika' : Greek christian reactions to the holocaust (Thesis). Oxford University.
- Bowman, Steven B. (2006). Jewish Resistance in Wartime Greece. Vallentine Mitchell. ISBN 978-0-85303-599-2.
- Bowman, Steven B. (2009). The Agony of Greek Jews, 1940–1945. Stanford University Press. ISBN 978-0-8047-7249-5.
- Dalven, Rachel (1984). "The Holocaust in Janina". Journal of Modern Greek Studies. 2 (1): 87–103. doi:10.1353/mgs.2010.0026. ISSN 1086-3265. S2CID 144138314.
- Droumpouki, Anna Maria (2016). "Shaping Holocaust memory in Greece: memorials and their public history". National Identities. 18 (2): 199–216. Bibcode:2016NatId..18..199D. doi:10.1080/14608944.2015.1027760. S2CID 144999147.
- Fleischer, Hagen (1991). "Griechenland" [Greece]. Dimension des Volkermords. Die Zahl der judischen Opfer des Nationalsozialismus [Dimension of Genocide: The Number of Jewish Victims of National Socialism] (in German). Oldenbourg Wissenschaftsverlag. pp. 241–274. ISBN 978-3-486-70833-2.
- Fleming, Katherine Elizabeth (2008). Greece: A Jewish History. Princeton University Press. ISBN 978-0-691-10272-6.
- Hantzaroula, Pothiti (2020). Child Survivors of the Holocaust in Greece: Memory, Testimony and Subjectivity. Routledge. ISBN 978-0-429-01897-8.
- Kavala, Maria (2015). Η καταστροφή των Εβραίων της Ελλάδας (1941-1944) [The Destruction of the Jews of Greece (1941–1944)] (in Greek). Σύνδεσμος Ελληνικών Ακαδημαϊκών Βιβλιοθηκών [Hellenic Academic Libraries Link]. hdl:11419/4437. ISBN 978-960-603-463-3.
- Kerem, Yitzchak (2012). "The Greek Government-in-exile and the Rescue of Jews from Greece". Holocaust Studies. 18 (2–3): 189–212. doi:10.1080/17504902.2012.11087301. S2CID 159458853.
- Kornetis, Kostis (2018). "Expropriating the Space of the Other: Property Spoliations of Thessalonican Jews in the 1940s". The Holocaust in Greece. Cambridge University Press. pp. 228–252. ISBN 978-1-108-47467-2.
- Králová, Kateřina (2016). "The "Holocausts" in Greece: victim competition in the context of postwar compensation for Nazi persecution". Holocaust Studies: 1–27. doi:10.1080/17504902.2016.1209837. S2CID 151405201.
- Lychounas, Michalis (2015). "Von der Sichtbarkeit jüdischen Lebens im nordgriechischen Raum". Die Okkupation Griechenlands im Zweiten Weltkrieg: Griechische und deutsche Erinnerungskultur (in German). Böhlau Verlag Köln Weimar. pp. 115–128. ISBN 978-3-412-22467-7.
- Marcou, Loïc (2015). "La Shoah à Salonique dans l'œuvre de l'écrivain Georges Ioannou". Cahiers balkaniques (in French). 43. doi:10.4000/ceb.8535. ISSN 0290-7402. S2CID 164607403.
- Mavrogordatos, George (2012). "The Holocaust in Greece: a Vindication of Assimilation". Études balkaniques (4): 5–17. ISSN 2534-8574.
- Mazower, Mark (2004). Salonica, City of Ghosts: Christians, Muslims and Jews 1430-1950. Knopf Doubleday Publishing Group. ISBN 978-0-307-42757-1.
- McElligott, Anthony (2022). The Last Transport: The Holocaust in the Eastern Aegean. Bloomsbury Academic. ISBN 978-1-4742-2798-8.
- Molho, Rena (2010). Salonica and Istanbul: Social, Political and Cultural Aspects of Jewish Life. Gorgias Press. doi:10.31826/9781463225803. ISBN 978-975-428-278-8.
- Molho, Rena (2014). Το ολοκαύτωμα των Ελλήνων Εβραίων: μελέτες ιστορίας και μνήμης [The Holocaust of the Greek Jews: studies in history and memory]. Ekdoseis Patakē. ISBN 978-960-16-6146-9.
- Molho, Michael; Nehama, Joseph (1948). In Memoriam: Hommage Aux Victimes Juives Des Nazis en Grèce (in French). Imp. N. Nicolaidès. OCLC 652350753.
- Plaut, Joshua Eli (2000). Greek Jewry in the Twentieth Century, 1913-1983: Patterns of Jewish Survival in the Greek Provinces Before and After the Holocaust. Fairleigh Dickinson University Press. ISBN 978-0-8386-3911-5.
- Saltiel, Leon (2020). The Holocaust in Thessaloniki: Reactions to the Anti-Jewish Persecution, 1942–1943. Routledge. ISBN 978-0-429-51415-9.
- Varon‑Vassard, Odette (2015). "Voix de femmes. Témoignages de jeunes filles juives grecques survivantes de la Shoah". Cahiers balkaniques (in French). 43. doi:10.4000/ceb.8528. ISSN 0290-7402.
- Varon-Vassard, Odette (2015). "La mémoire de la Shoah en Grèce". Anatoli. De l'Adriatique à la Caspienne. Territoires, Politique, Sociétés (in French). 6 (6): 213–233. doi:10.4000/anatoli.305. ISSN 2111-4064.
- Varon-Vassard, Odette (2015). "Der Genozid an den griechischen Juden: Zeugnisse des Überlebens und Geschichtsschreibung seit 1948". Die Okkupation Griechenlands im Zweiten Weltkrieg: Griechische und deutsche Erinnerungskultur (in German). Böhlau Verlag Köln Weimar. pp. 85–114. ISBN 978-3-412-22467-7.
