= Bibliography of World War II battles and campaigns in East Asia, South East Asia and the Pacific =

This is a Bibliography of World War II battles and campaigns in East Asia, South East Asia, India and the Pacific. It aims to include the major theaters, campaigns and battles of the Asia-Pacific Theater of World War II. It is part of Wikipedia's larger effort to document the Bibliography of World War II. Its counterpart for the European, North African and Middle Eastern theater is the Bibliography of World War II battles and campaigns in Europe, North Africa and the Middle East.

== Bibliography ==
=== Second Sino-Japanese War (1937–1945) ===
- Barrett, David P. (2001). Chinese Collaboration with Japan, 1932–1945. Stanford University Press. ISBN 0-8047-3768-1.
- Dreyer, Edward L. (1995). China at War 1901-1949. Routledge.
- Hotta, Eri (2007). Pan-Asianism and Japan's War: 1931–1945. Palgrave Macmillan. ISBN 978-0-230-60103-1.
- Hsiung, James C.; Levine, Stephen I., eds. (1992). China's Bitter Victory: The War with Japan, 1937–1945. Armonk, NY: M.E. Sharpe. ISBN 0-87332-708-X.
- Jowett, Philip S. (2016). Images of War: China and Japan at War 1937–1945. Rare Photographs from Wartime Archives. Pen & Sword. ISBN 978-1-4738-7441-1.
- ——— (2020). Japan's Asian Allies 1941–45. Osprey Publishing. ISBN 978-1-4728-3697-7.
- Lai, Benjamin (2017). Shanghai and Nanjing 1937: Massacre on the Yangtze. Osprey Publishing. ISBN 978-1-4728-1750-1.
- Macri, Franco David (2015). Clash of Empires in South China: The Allied Nations' Proxy War with Japan, 1935–1941.
- Mitter, Rana (2013). China's War With Japan, 1937–1945: The Struggle for Survival. Allen Lane. ISBN 978-1-84614-010-5.
- ——— (2013). Forgotten Ally: China's World War II, 1937–1945. Houghton Mifflin Harcourt. ISBN 978-0-547-84056-7.
- Schoppa, R. Keith (2011). In a Sea of Bitterness: Refugees during the Sino-Japanese War. Harvard University Press.
- Whitehurst, G. William (2020). The China Incident: Igniting the Second Sino-Japanese War. McFarland & Company. ISBN 978-1-4766-8233-4.

=== Pacific War (1941–1945), general ===
- Bergerud, Eric M. (1996). Touched With Fire: The Land War in the South Pacific. New York: Penguin Books.
- ——— (2000). Fire in the Sky: The Air War in the South Pacific. Boulder, Colorado: Westview Press.
- Bradley, John H.; Dice, Jack W.; Buell, Thomas B.; Griess, Thomas E. (1992). The Second World War: Asia and the Pacific. Wayne, N.J: Avery Publishing Group.
- Charlton, Peter (1983). The Unnecessary War: Island Campaigns of the South-West Pacific 1944–45. South Melbourne: The MacMillan Company of Australia.
- Costello, John (1982). The Pacific War, 1941–1945. New York: Quill.
- Dockrill, Saki (1994). From Pearl Harbor to Hiroshima: The Second World War in Asia and the Pacific, 1941–45. Palgrave Macmillan. ISBN 978-0-312-10246-3.
- Hastings, Max (2007). Nemesis: The Battle for Japan, 1944–45. London: HarperCollins.
- Ienaga, Saburo (1978). The Pacific War: 1931–45. New York: Pantheon.
- Marston, Daniel, ed. (2010). The Pacific War: From Pearl Harbor to Hiroshima. Oxford: Osprey.
- McNalty, Bernard (1978). War in the Pacific: Pearl Harbor to Tokyo Bay. New York: Mayflower.
- Myers, Michael (2015). The Pacific War and Contingent Victory: Why Japanese Defeat Was Not Inevitable. University Press of Kansas. ISBN 978-0-7006-2088-3.
- Ofstie, Ralph A. (1946). The Campaigns of the Pacific War. Washington, D.C.: United States Government Printing Office.
- Paine, Sarah C. M. (2012). The Wars for Asia 1911–1949. Cambridge: Cambridge Univ. Press.
- Spector, Ronald (1985). Eagle Against the Sun: The American War With Japan. New York: Vintage Books. ISBN 978-0-394-74101-7.
- Thompson, Robert S. (2001). Empires on the Pacific: World War II and the Struggle for the Mastery of Asia. New York: Basic Books. ISBN 978-0-465-08575-0.
- Thorne, Christopher (1986). The Far Eastern War: States and Societies, 1941–45. London: Unwin.
- Toll, Ian W. (2011). Pacific Crucible: War at Sea in the Pacific, 1941–1942. New York: W. W. Norton.
- ——— (2015). The Conquering Tide: War in the Pacific Islands, 1942–1944. New York: W. W. Norton.
- ——— (2020). Twilight of the Gods: War in the Western Pacific, 1944–1945. New York: W. W. Norton.
- Willmott, H. P. (1999). The Second World War in the Far East. London: Cassell. ISBN 978-0-304-36127-4.
- Wood, James B. (2007). Japanese Military Strategy in the Pacific War: Was Defeat Inevitable?. Lanham: Rowman & Littlefield.
- Zaloga, Steven J. (1995). Tank Battles of the Pacific War 1941–1945. Concord Publications.

=== Attack on Pearl Harbor (1941) ===
- Beekman, Allan (1992). Crisis: The Japanese Attack on Pearl Harbor and Southeast Asia. Honolulu: Heritage Press.
- Goldstein, Donald M.; Dillon, Katherine V., eds. (1993). The Pearl Harbor Papers: Inside the Japanese Plans. Washington, D.C.: Brassey's. ISBN 978-0-02-881001-0.
- Hotta, Eri (2013). Japan 1941: Countdown to Infamy. New York: Alfred A. Knopf.
- Prange, Gordon W. (1981). At Dawn We Slept. McGraw-Hill. ISBN 978-0-07-050669-5.
- Prange, Gordon W. (1988). Dec. 7, 1941: The Day the Japanese Attacked Pearl Harbor. McGraw-Hill.
- Rosenberg, Emily S. (2005). A Date Which Will Live: Pearl Harbor in American Memory. Durham and London: Duke University Press.
- U.S. Government (1977). The "Magic" Background of Pearl Harbor. Vol. 1–5 (+3 Appendices). U.S. Government Printing Office.
- Zimm, Alan D. (2011). Attack on Pearl Harbor: Strategy, Combat, Myths, Deceptions. Philadelphia and Newbury: Casemate Publishers.

=== Battle of Hong Kong (1941) ===
- Lai, Benjamin (2014). Hong Kong 1941–45: First Strike in the Pacific War. Oxford: Osprey Publishing. ISBN 978-1-78200-269-7.

=== Japanese Invasion of Thailand (1941) ===
- Jayanama, Direk (2008). Thailand and World War II. Silkworm Books.

=== Malayan campaign (1941–1942) ===
- Allen, Louis (1977). Singapore 1941–1942. Wilmington: University of Delaware Press.

=== 1st Philippines campaign (1941–1942) ===
- Conroy, Robert (1969). The Battle of Bataan: America's greatest defeat. New York: Macmillan.
- Falk, Stanley L. (1962). Bataan: The March of Death. New York: Norton.
- Ind, Allison (1944). Bataan, the Judgment Seat: The Saga of the Philippine Command of the U.S. Army Air Force, May 1941 to May 1942. New York: Macmillan.

=== Burma campaign (1941–1945) ===
- Allen, Louis (1973). Sittang, the Last Battle: The End of the Japanese in Burma, July–August 1945. London: Macdonald.
- ——— (2002). Burma: The Longest War, 1941–45. London: Phoenix.
- Anders, Leslie (1965). The Ledo Road: General Joseph W. Stilwell's Highway to China. Norman: Oklahoma University Press.
- Baker, Alan (1972). Merrill's Marauders. New York: Ballantine.
- Carew, Tim (1969). The Longest Retreat: The Burma Campaign, 1942. London: Hamilton.
- Chaphekar, Shankarrao G. (1955). A Brief Study of the Burma Campaign, 1943–45. Poona (India): Maharashta Militarisation Board.
- Diamond, Jon (2016). Burma Road 1943–1944: Stilwell's Assault on Myitkyina. Osprey Publishing. ISBN 978-1-4728-1126-4.

=== Dutch East Indies campaign (1941–1942) ===
- Lohnstein, Marc (2021). The Netherlands East Indies Campaign 1941–42: Japan's Quest for Oil. Osprey Publishing. ISBN 978-1-4728-4354-8.

=== Battle of the Coral Sea (1942) ===
- Johnston, Stanley (1942). Queen of the Flat Tops: The U.S.S. Lexington and the Coral Sea Battle. New York: Dutton.

=== New Guinea campaign (1942–1945) ===
- Gamble, Bruce (2010). Fortress Rabaul: The Battle for the Southwest Pacific, January 1942–April 1943. New York: Zenith Press.

=== Aleutian islands campaign (1942–1943) ===
- Ford, Corey (1943). Short Cut to Tokyo: The Battle for the Aleutians. New York: Scriber.
- Garfield, Brian W. (1969). The Thousand-Mile War: World War II in Alaska and the Aleutians. New York: Doubleday.
- Griffin, D. F. (1944). First steps to Tokyo: the Royal Canadian Air Force in the Aleutians. New York: Dent.
- Handleman, Howard (1943). Bridge to Victory: The Story of the Reconquest of the Aleutians. New York: Random House.
- Herder, Brian Lane (2019). The Aleutians 1942–43: Struggle for the North Pacific. Osprey Publishing. ISBN 978-1-4728-3255-9.
- Paneth, Philip (1943). Alaskan Backdoor to Japan. London: Alliance.
- U.S. War Department (1944). The Capture of Attu. Washington DC: Infantry Journal Press.

=== Battle of Midway (1942) ===
- Healy, Mark (1993). Midway 1942: Turning Point in the Pacific. Osprey Publishing.

=== Guadalcanal campaign (1942–1943) ===
- Andrews, Stan (1944). Close-up for Guadalcanal. Wellington (New Zealand): Progressive.
- Coggins, Jack (1972). The Campaign for Guadalcanal: A Battle that made History. New York: Doubleday.
- Cook, Charles (1968). The Battle of Cape Esperance: Encounter at Guadalcanal. New York: Crowell.
- Frank, Richard B. (1990). Guadalcanal. New York: Penguin Books.
- Gallant, Thomas G. (1963). On Valor's Side. New York: Doubleday.
- George, John B. (1947). Shots fired in Anger: a Rifleman's Eye View of the Activities on the Island of Guadalcanal in the Solomons, during the Elimination of the Japanese Forces there. Georgetown, SC: Small Arms.
- Griffith, Samuel B. (1963). The Battle for Guadalcanal. Philadelphia: Lippincott.
- Hornfischer, James D. (2011). Neptune's Inferno: The U.S. Navy at Guadalcanal. New York: Bantam.
- Hoyt, Edwin P. (1982). Guadalcanal. New York: Stein & Day.
- Kent, Graeme (1971). Guadalcanal: Island Ordeal. New York: Ballantine.
- Leckie, Robert (1965). Challenge for the Pacific: Guadalcanal – The Turning Point of the War. New York: Doubleday.
- Lee, Robert E. (1981). Victory at Guadalcanal. Novato, CA: Presidio.
- Merillat, Herbert C.; et al. (Herbert L. Merillat) (1979) [1944]. Island: a History of the First Marine Division on Guadalcanal, Aug 7 – Dec 9, 1942. Boston: Houghton Mifflin.
- Merillat, Herbert C. (1979). Guadalcanal Remembered. New York: Zenger.
- Miller, John (1949). Guadalcanal: The First Offensive. Washington DC: U.S. Department of the Army.
- Miller, Thomas G. (1969). The Cactus Air Force. New York: Harper.
- Mueller, Joseph N. (1992). Guadalcanal 1942: The Marines strike back. Osprey Military. ISBN 978-1-85532-253-0.
- Newcomb, Richard F. (1961). Savo: The Incredible Naval Debacle off Guadalcanal. New York: Holt.
- Stewart, Adrian (1985). Guadalcanal: World War II's fiercest naval campaign. London: Kimber.
- Stille, Mark (2013). The Naval Battles for Guadalcanal 1942: Clash for Supremacy in the Pacific. Oxford: Osprey Publishing. ISBN 978-1-78096-155-2.
- ——— (2015). Guadalcanal 1942–43: America's first Victory on the Road to Tokyo. Oxford: Osprey Publishing. ISBN 978-1-4728-0693-2.
- Tanaka, Raizō (1956). Japan's losing struggle for Guadalcanal. Annapolis (MD/USA): Naval Institute.
- Tregaskis, Richard (1943). Guadalcanal Diary. New York: Random House.
- Werstein, Irving (1963). Guadalcanal. New York: Crowell.
- Zimmerman, John L., ed. (1949). The Guadalcanal Campaign: August 1942 to February 1943. Washington DC: U.S. Marine Corps.

=== Battle of the Bismarck Sea (1943) ===
- Graham, Burton (1944). None shall survive: the graphic story of the annihilation of the Japanese armada in the Bismarck Sea Battle. Sydney: Johnston.

=== Central Pacific Campaign (1943-1945) ===
- Albee, Parker Bishop Jr.; Freeman, Keller Cushing (1995). Shadow of Suribachi: Raising the Flags on Iwo Jima. Westport, Connecticut: Praeger.

=== Japanese Invasion of India (1944) ===
- Lyman, Robert (2011). Japan's Last Bid for Victory: The Invasion of India, 1944. Praetorian Press.

=== 2nd Philippines campaign (1944–1945) ===
- Breuer, William B. (1986). Retaking The Philippines: America's Return to Corregidor & Bataan, 1944–1945. St Martin's Press. ISBN 978-0-312-67802-9.
- Chun, Clayton (2015). Leyte 1944: Return to the Philippines. Oxford: Osprey. ISBN 978-1-4728-0690-1.
- Field, James A. (1947). The Japanese at Leyte Gulf: The Sho Operation. Princeton University Press.
- Friedman, Kenneth (2001). Afternoon of the Rising Sun: The Battle of Leyte Gulf. Presidio Press. ISBN 0-89141-756-7.
- Hoyt, Edwin P. (2003). The Men of the Gambier Bay: The Amazing True Story of the Battle of Leyte Gulf. The Lyons Press. ISBN 1-58574-643-6.
- Morison, Samuel Eliot (1958). Leyte: June 1944 – January 1945. History of United States Naval Operations in World War II. Vol. XII. Little, Brown and Company.
- ——— (1959). The Liberation of the Philippines: Luzon, Mindanao, the Visayas 1944–1945. History of United States Naval Operations in World War II. Vol. XIII. Little, Brown and Company.
- Smith, Robert Ross (2005). Triumph in the Philippines: The War in the Pacific. University Press of the Pacific. ISBN 1-4102-2495-3.
- Vego, Milan N. (2006). Battle for Leyte, 1944: Allied And Japanese Plans, Preparations, And Execution. Naval Institute Press. ISBN 1-55750-885-2.
- Willmott, H. P. (2005). The Battle of Leyte Gulf: The Last Fleet Action. Indiana University Press. ISBN 0-253-34528-6.

=== Battle of Leyte Gulf (October 1944) ===
- Stille, Mark (2021). Leyte Gulf 1944 (1): The Battles of the Sibuyan Sea and Samar. Oxford: Osprey Publishing. ISBN 978-1-4728-4279-4.
- ——— (2022). Leyte Gulf 1944 (2): Surigao Strait and Cape Engaño. Oxford: Osprey Publishing. ISBN 978-1-4728-4286-2.

=== Battle of Okinawa (1945) ===
- Feifer, George (1992). Tennozan: The Battle of Okinawa and the Atomic Bomb. New York: Ticknor & Fields.
- Spurr, Russell (1981). A Glorious Way to Die: The Kamikaze Mission of the Battleship Yamato, April 1945. New York: Newmarket Press.

=== Atomic bombings of Hiroshima and Nagasaki (1945) ===
- Allen, Thomas B.; Polmar, Norman (1995). Code-Name Downfall: The Secret Plan to Invade Japan and Why Truman Dropped the Bomb. New York: Simon & Schuster. ISBN 978-0-684-80406-4.
- Amrine, Michael (1960). The Great Decision: The Secret History of the Atomic Bomb. London: Heinemann.
- Baker, Paul R. (1968). The Atomic Bomb: The Great Decision. New York: Holt, Rinehart & Winston.
- Bathchelder, Robert C. (1962). The Irreversible Decision. Boston: Houghton Mifflin.
- Chinnock, Frank W. (1969). Nagasaki: The Forgotten Bomb. Cleveland: World.
- Feis, Herbert (1961). The Atomic Bomb and the End of World War II. Princeton Legacy Library. ISBN 0-691-01057-9. – Alternate title: Japan Subdued: The Atomic Bomb and the End of the War in the Pacific
- Gigon, Fernand (1958). Formula for Death: E=MC² (the atom bombs and after). London: Wingate.
- Giovannitti, Len; Freed, Fred (1965). The Decision to drop the Bomb. New York: Coward-McCann.
- Groueff, Stéphane (1967). Manhattan Project: The Untold Story of the Making of the Atomic Bomb. London: Collins.
- Groves, Leslie R. (1962). Now it can be told: The Story of the Manhattan Project. New York: Harper.
- Hersey, John (1946). Hiroshima. New York: Alfred A. Knopf.
- Miscamble, Wilson D. (2011). The Most Controversial Decision: Truman, the Atomic Bombs, and the Defeat of Japan. New York: Cambridge University Press.
- Pellegrino, Charles R. (2010). The Last Train from Hiroshima: The Survivors Look Back. New York: Henry Holt & Co.
- Rhodes, Richard (1995). The Making of the Atomic Bomb. New York: Simon & Schuster. This work also won a Pulitzer Prize.
- Rotter, Andrew J. (2008). Hiroshima: The World's Bomb. New York: Oxford University Press.
- Takayama, Hitoshi (1973). Hiroshima in Memoriam and Today: Hiroshima as a Testimony of Peace for Mankind.
- Weller, George; Weller, Anthony, eds. (2006). First into Nagasaki: The Censored Eyewitness Dispatches on Post-Atomic Japan and Its Prisoners of War. New York: Crown.
- Yanagida, Kunio (1975). A Blank in the Weather Map. Tokyo: Shinchosha.
- Yass, Marion (1971). Hiroshima. London: Wayland.

=== Soviet–Japanese War ===
- Glantz, David M. (2003). The Soviet Strategic Offensive in Manchuria, 1945: August Storm. Routledge.
