= The Pacific War Trilogy =

Three volume history of the Pacific War by Ian W. Toll

- Author: Ian W. Toll
- Audio read by: Grover Gardner and P. J. Ochlan
- Language: English
- Genre: History
- Publisher: W. W. Norton & Company
- Publication date: 2011, 2015 and 2020
- Publication place: United States
- Media type: Print, Kindle, Audiobook
- Website: W. W. Norton & Company

The Pacific War Trilogy is a three-volume history of the war in the Pacific, written by author and military historian Ian W. Toll. The series was published by W. W. Norton & Company. Toll is a graduate of St George's School in Middletown, Rhode Island. In 1989, he received an undergraduate degree in American history from Georgetown University; in 1995 he received a master's degree in public policy from Harvard Kennedy School at Harvard University.

== Book series ==
=== The Pacific Crucible ===
Pacific Crucible: War at Sea in the Pacific, 1941–1942 is the first volume in the Pacific War trilogy. The book is a narrative history of the opening phase of the Pacific War, which took place in the eastern Pacific between the Allies and the Empire of Japan. It was published by W. W. Norton & Company in 2011 (hardcover and Kindle) and 2012 (paperback). It was released as an audiobook narrated by Grover Gardner by Audible Studios in 2011. The book was the winner of the Northern California Book Award for Nonfiction in 2012.

- 640 pp. (hardcover) ISBN 978-0-393-34341-0; Pacific Crucible at W. W. Norton.
- 22 hrs and 6 mins (audiobook); Pacific Crucible at Audible Studios.

=== The Conquering Tide ===
The Conquering Tide: War in the Pacific Islands, 1942–1944 is the second volume in the Pacific War trilogy. The book is a narrative history of the middle phase of the Pacific War, which took place in the central and southern Pacific between the Allies and the Empire of Japan. It was published by W. W. Norton & Company in 2015 (hardcover and Kindle) and 2016 (paperback). It was released as an audiobook narrated by P. J. Ochlan by Recorded Books in 2015. The book was a New York Times best selling non-fiction book.

- 656 pp. (hardcover), ISBN 978-0393080643; The Conquering Tide at W. W. Norton.
- 27 hours and 22 minutes (audiobook); The Conquering Tide at Recorded Books.

=== Twilight of the Gods ===
Twilight of the Gods: War in the Western Pacific, 1944–1945 is the third and final volume in the Pacific War trilogy. The book is a narrative history of the final phase of the Pacific War, which took place in the western Pacific between the Allies and the Empire of Japan. It was published by W. W. Norton & Company in 2020 (hardcover and Kindle). It was also released as an audiobook narrated by P. J. Ochlan by Recorded Books in 2020. The book was a New York Times best selling non-fiction book.

- 944 pp. (hardcover), ISBN 978-0393080650; Twilight of the Gods at W. W. Norton.
- 36 hours and 46 minutes (audiobook); Twilight of the Gods at Recorded Books.

== Similar or related works ==
- Allies at War by Tim Bouverie (2025)
- The Second World War by Antony Beevor (2012).
- Inferno: The World at War, 1939-1945 by Max Hastings (2011).
- The Storm of War by Andrew Roberts (2009).

== See also ==
- Pacific Ocean theater of World War II
- South West Pacific Area (command)
