= The End: Hitler's Germany, 1944–45 =

Book by Ian Kershaw

The End: Hitler's Germany 1944–45
- Cover of the first edition
- Author: Sir Ian Kershaw
- Language: English
- Subject: World War II
- Publisher: Allen Lane
- Publication date: 2011
- Publication place: United Kingdom
- Media type: Print
- Pages: 592
- ISBN: 978-0-7139-9716-3

The End: Hitler's Germany 1944–45 is a 2011 book by Sir Ian Kershaw, in which the author charts the course of World War II between the period of the failed 20 July plot to assassinate Adolf Hitler in July 1944, by Claus von Stauffenberg, until late May 1945, when the last of the Nazi regime's leaders were arrested and the government dissolved.

Kershaw looks for answers to the question of why Germany did not capitulate when there was no chance of victory, especially as Hitler had said "Wars are finally decided by the recognition on one side or the other that the war can't be won any more." At the time he said this Germany was waging war on two fronts and was heavily outnumbered by both the allied forces and those of the Soviet Union. On the Eastern Front alone the Wehrmacht and Luftwaffe were outnumbered eleven-to-one in infantry, seven-to-one in armour, twenty-to-one in field artillery and twenty-to-one in airpower. Or, as Kershaw writes, why did they continue the fight when Germany had been "battered into submission, its economy destroyed, its cities in ruins, the country occupied by foreign powers"? An estimated 49 percent of German military losses occurred during the last 10 months of the war in Europe, and Kershaw discusses that if the assassination attempt had not failed how many lives might have been spared in both civilian and military casualties.

The book has received widespread acclaim since publication with favourable reviews in The Daily Telegraph, The New York Times, the Irish Times, The Financial Times and other sources. Kershaw has said this will be his last book on the Nazi regime and that this particular period had been an "unresolved issue" for him as he had never written on the final stages of the war, and that "There is about Hitler personally, and the Nazis in general, a sort of cultism that attracts fascination".

== Synopsis ==
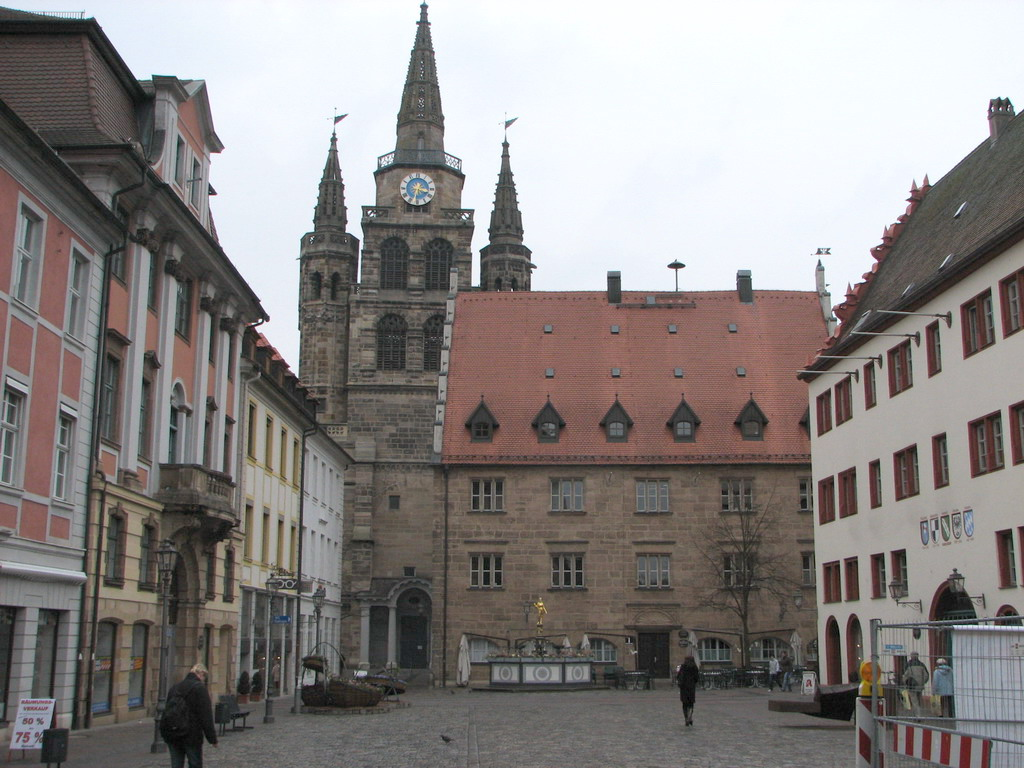
Town centre of Ansbach

The book begins with an example of the German refusal to surrender, and how this refusal by the Nazis to accept defeat would eventually lead to the deaths of millions. With American troops on the outskirts of Ansbach, the local commandant, Dr Ernst Meyer, an ardent Nazi, insisted on fighting to the end. A student, Robert Limpert, having seen the destruction wrought on Würzburg, took action in an attempt to prevent the same happening to his own town. He was seen in an act of sabotage by two members of the Hitler Youth who reported him to the police. He was arrested, and after a trial lasting a few minutes the commandant sentenced the young man to death by hanging. As the noose was placed around Limpert's neck he broke free but was recaptured quickly. No one in the crowd watching tried to help and some kicked and punched him. On the second attempt the rope broke, and on the third he was finally hanged. The commandant ordered the body to remain where it was "until it stinks" and shortly after he fled the town. American troops cut the body down four hours later when they entered the town.

Chapter three covers the fall of East Prussia and the attack on Memel. The Soviet army launched their attack on 5 October. The German commandants did not order the evacuation of the civilian population until 7 October, which resulted in fully one-third of the population being captured. There were widespread reports of mass rape and murder by the advancing Red Army. A letter from a German officer, Colonel-General Georg-Hans Reinhardt to his wife is used to show one reason the Wehrmacht refused to surrender to the advancing Soviets. Having visited an area retaken and seen for himself the atrocities carried out he wrote "Hatred fills us since we have seen how the Bolsheviks have wrought havoc in an area we have retaken, south of Gumbinnen. There can be no other aim for us other than to hold out and protect our homeland."

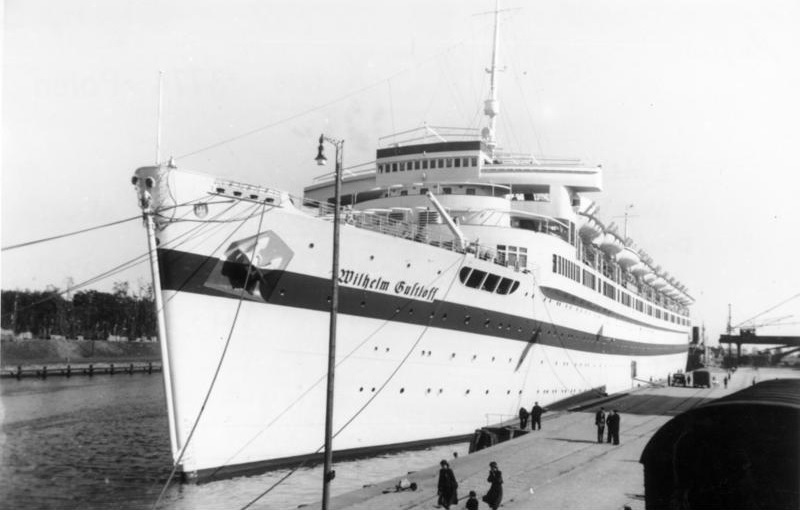
The Wilhelm Gustloff

Chapter four begins with the thoughts of a German soldier who questions why they continue the fight when it is obvious all is lost. The Ardennes Offensive is looked at in detail. The German High Command hoped it would be a turning point in the war. The chapter also covers the lack of basic supplies such as steel and coal. Massive drops in production were caused by destruction of rolling stock in heavy bombing raids; canals and road networks were also targeted to disrupt the Nazi supply lines.

In chapter five Kershaw touches on the loss of civilian life caused by the Soviet advance, such as the 7,000 who drowned with the sinking of the Wilhelm Gustloff and also an estimated fifty-thousand people dead fleeing the Warthegau region.

== Reception ==
James J. Sheehan in The New York Times wrote that Kershaw clears away various misconceptions of the period and describes the terrible fate endured by the civilian population. He also wrote, "No one has written a better account of the human dimensions of Nazi Germany’s end." Antony Beevor in the Telegraph wrote that the subject matter is doubly important due to the massive loss of life in the final months of the war, all to no purpose. However, Ben Shepard wrote in The Guardian that the book was flawed, saying, "The real difficulty with The End is that its premise is false. It simply isn't true that no one has dealt adequately with the question of why Germany kept fighting. On the contrary, historians have discussed this issue ad nauseam; Kershaw himself gave an excellent account in his monumental biography of Hitler." David Cesarani called the book a "magisterial summing up of the events" and that "it cannot be bettered for relentless analysis". Jill Stephenson, a professor emeritus of the University of Edinburgh, asked, "Do we need another book on the Second World War? In general, no. But in this particular case, the answer is a resounding 'yes'."

== See also ==
- Allies at War by Tim Bouverie (2025)
- The Second World War by Antony Beevor (2012).
- Inferno: The World at War, 1939-1945 by Max Hastings (2011).
- The Storm of War by Andrew Roberts (2009).
