= Twilight of the Gods: War in the Western Pacific, 1944–1945 =

Book about the war in the western Pacific 1944–1945

- Twilight of the Gods
- Author: Ian W. Toll
- Audio read by: P. J. Ochlan
- Language: English
- Series: The Pacific War Trilogy
- Genre: History
- Publisher: W. W. Norton & Company
- Publication date: 2020
- Publication place: United States
- Media type: Print, Kindle, Audiobook
- Pages: 944pp (hardcover); 36 hours and 46 minutes (audiobook)
- ISBN: 978-0393080650
- Preceded by: The Conquering Tide: War in the Pacific Islands, 1942-1944 (Volume 2).
- Website: Twilight of the Gods at W. W. Norton

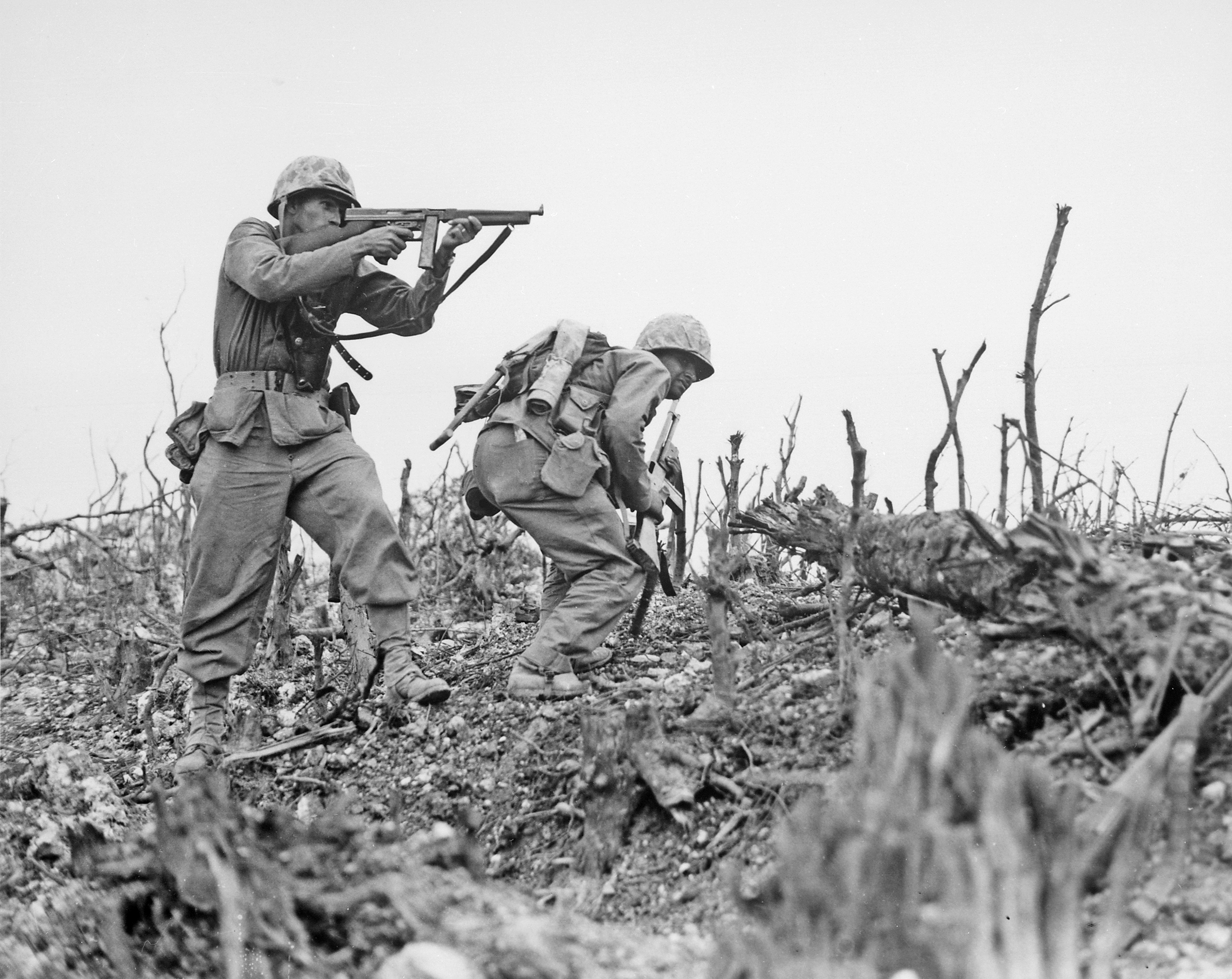
US Marines on Okinawa

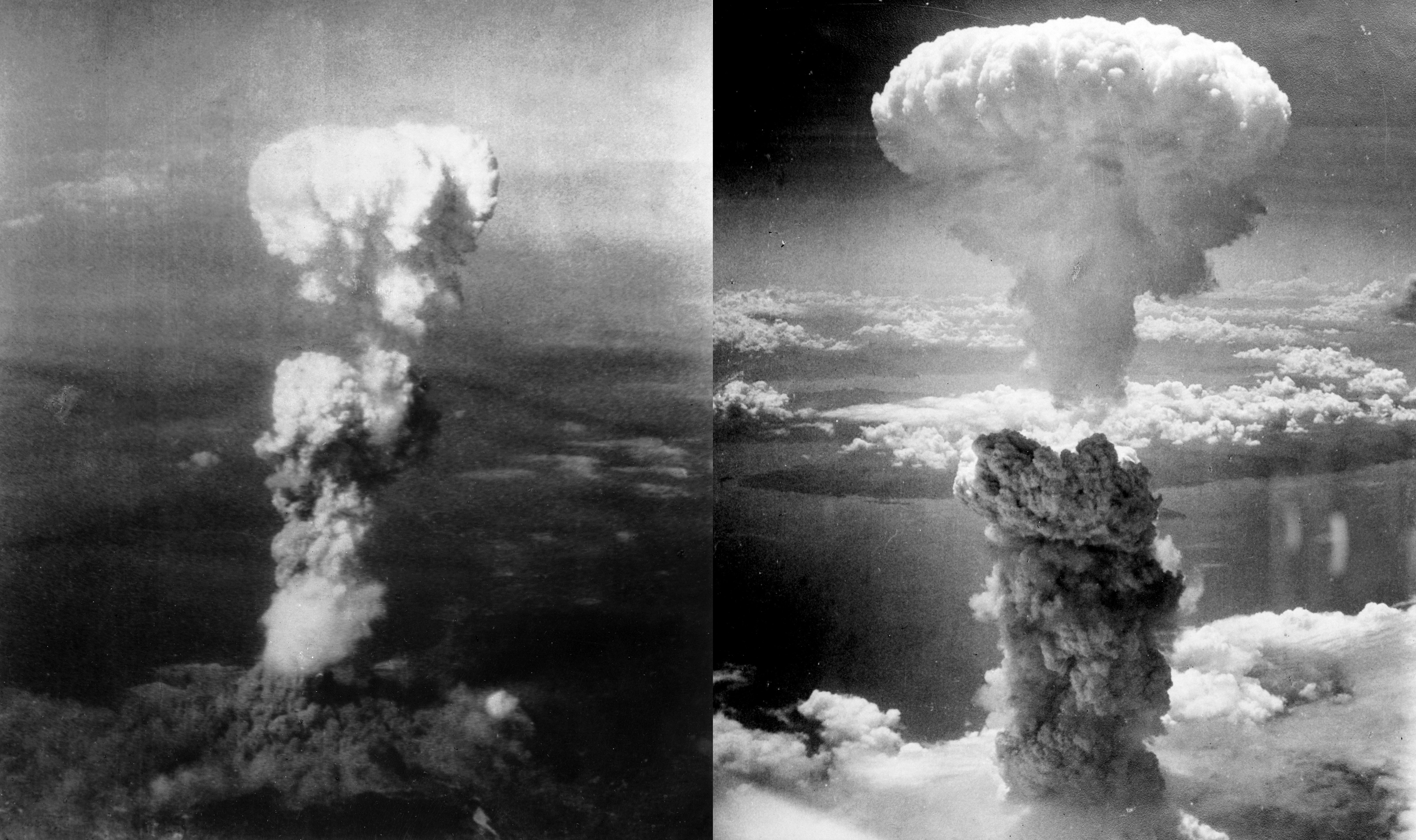
Atomic bombing of Japan

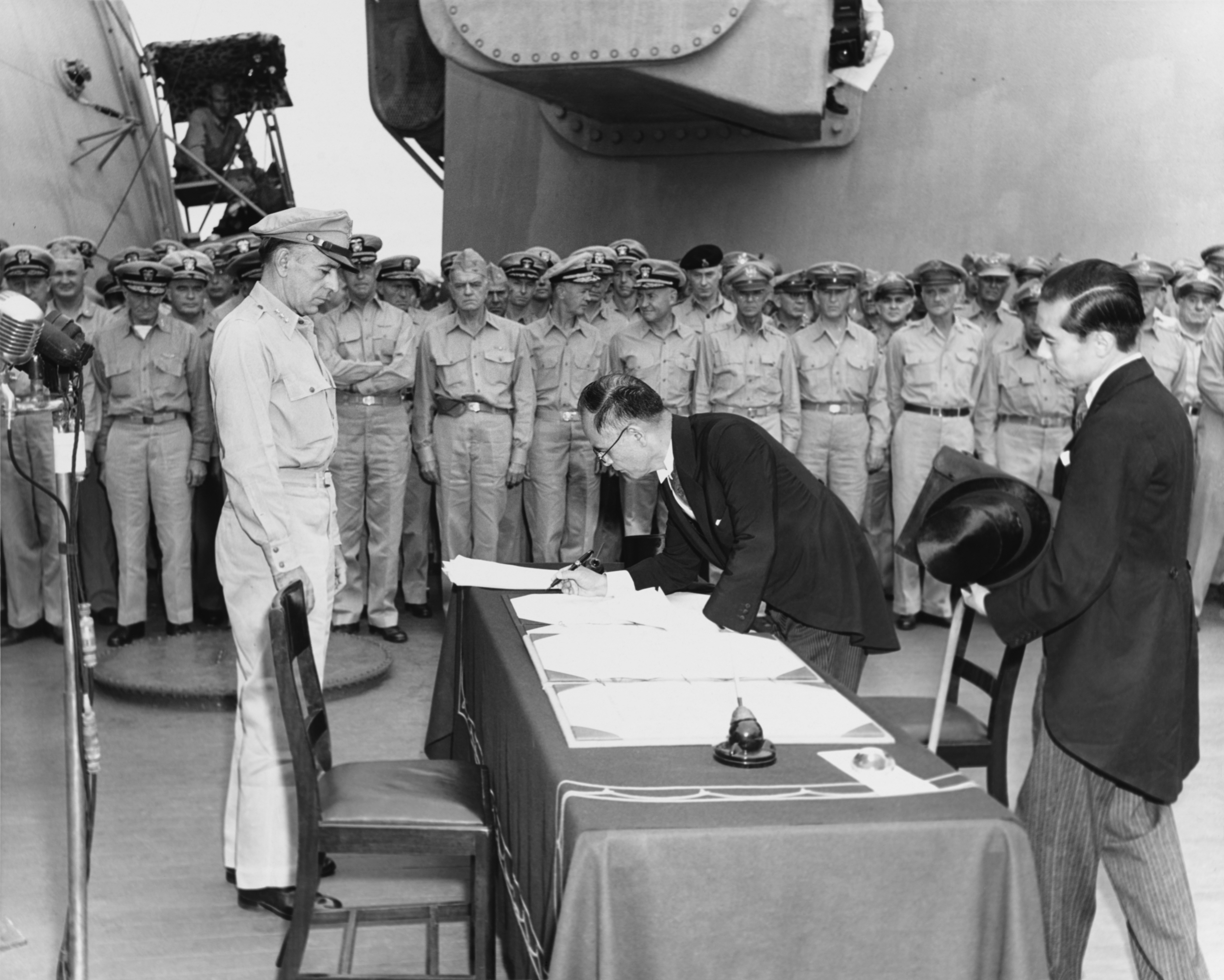
Mamoru Shigemitsu signs the Instrument of Surrender, officially ending the Second World War

Twilight of the Gods: War in the Western Pacific, 1944–1945 is the final volume in the Pacific War trilogy written by best selling author and historian Ian W. Toll. The book is a narrative history of the final phase of the Pacific War, that took place in the western Pacific between the Allies and the Empire of Japan. It was published by W. W. Norton & Company in 2020 (hardcover and Kindle). It was also released as an audiobook narrated by P. J. Ochlan by Recorded Books in 2020. The first volume in the trilogy, Pacific Crucible: War at Sea in the Pacific, 1941–1942, was published in 2011; the second volume in the trilogy, The Conquering Tide: War in the Pacific Islands, 1942-1944, was published in 2015.

== Synopsis ==
Continuing the story of the Pacific war, Twilight of the Gods covers the period from July 1944 to the end of the conflict in September 1945. The story begins with the July 1944 conference between General Douglas MacArthur and Admiral Chester Nimitz in Hawaii, where the dispute between the two principal military leaders over the best path to defeat the Japanese was mediated by President Franklin Roosevelt. Toll continues into a detailed narrative of the long and multiple battles that resulted in the liberation of the Philippines. Toll then begins the story of the final phase of the war in the Pacific, the invasion of the Japanese home islands, beginning with the Battle of Iwo Jima and then moving into a detailed account of the fight for the island of Okinawa. Toll concludes the story with information about the planned invasion of the Japanese main islands, the Atomic bombing of Hiroshima and Nagasaki, and the Japanese surrender and American occupation of Japan.

The story of the rivalry between Douglas MacArthur and Chester Nimitz provides an important backdrop to the story, one that resembles the rivalry between the Americans and the British in Europe, but is focused more on geography than resources; at this point in the conflict the American military-industrial complex was able to provide more material to both leaders than was needed to win the conflict, the dispute centered on which geographic path to Japan would lead to the quickest victory. From this point the central figures in Toll's account are primarily the leaders of the Navy— King, Nimitz, Spruance and Halsey, with Nimitz shown as being the principal strategist of the American Pacific war and Spruance emerging as the chief tactician implementing Nimitz's plans, while Ernest King gradually fades into an important, but background role.

One figure that stands out in Toll's story for criticism is Admiral William “Bull” Halsey. Mark Perry writes in the New York Times,

"The charge sheet against Halsey is long and complex, but is nowhere rendered more grimly than in Toll's description of his “pattern of confusion, sloppiness and impulsiveness in basic procedures,” his “slapdash habits,” his penchant “to speak first and think later,” his persistent promotion of his own “glorified public image” and his questionable familiarity with naval aviation — a requirement, you would think, in a theater that featured carrier operations. But Halsey cultivated loyalty and received it. Vice Adm. Roland Smoot, one of the Navy's more acclaimed fighters, called him “a complete and utter clown,” while admitting that “if he said, ‘Let's go to hell together,’ you'd go to hell with him.” Halsey was always on the edge of being fired, and knew it: “I am most apologetic for the present mix-up,” he wrote to Nimitz after one foul-up. “I can assure you that my intentions were excellent, but my execution rotten.”"

In writing about the Battle of Iwo Jima, Toll writes, "The bombardment force, which had arrived off Iwo Jima the same day the carrier planes hit Tokyo, buried the islands under an avalanche of high-explosive shells. Wrapped in a shroud of smoke and flame, nothing of Iwo Jima could be seen from the fleet, except (sporadically) the peak of Mt. Suribachi. The projectiles arced toward the island in parabolic trajectories, high and low, according to the caliber of the gun and the distance that each warship lay offshore. The successive explosions merged into a solitary, unbroken roar. Men watching from the rails of the ships felt the blast concussions in their viscera." (Note: Toll, I. W. (2015). Twilight of the Gods, pp. 485.)

The book goes into some detail about the desperate and vain campaign of the Kamikaze pilots, men who were often barely trained, usually college-age individuals, who entered the war with one single mission: they were to fly "their planes into American ships, or died trying". While they were able to accomplish this futile mission in a number of instances, including successful attacks against aircraft carriers, they were ultimately unable to alter the course of the war or even significantly change a single battle. In describing the program, Wendell Jamieson writes, "in the beginning of the Kamikaze program, the flyers, both new and veteran, were eager to volunteer. But as the war drags on, and the Allies get closer to the homeland, they begin to resist, or to at least question the strategy. More and more pilots turn back with mysterious engine malfunctions. One pilot does so nine times, and is executed. He was a graduate of the elite Wasada University. What a terrible waste: he was exactly the kind of person Japan would need to rebuild in the months ahead."

In the final pages of the story, Toll describes the penultimate event of the war. "Little Boy exploded at 8:16 a.m., 1,870 feet above the ground, only 550 feet wide of its aiming point. The nuclear chain reaction it triggered created a core temperature of about 1 million degrees Celsius, igniting the air around it to a diameter of nearly a kilometer. The fireball engulfed the center of the city, vaporizing about 20,000 people on the ground. Thermal and ionizing radiation killed virtually all people within a kilometer of the surface of the fireball, burning them to death or rupturing their internal organs. Farther out, in successive concentric circles around the epicenter, people were exposed to gamma rays, neutron radiation, flash burns, the blast wave, and firestorms ... Later, investigators found the shadows of people caught within the inner radius around the hypocenter. They had been vaporized, but their bodies had left faint silhouettes on the pavement or on nearby walls." (Note: Toll, I. W. (2015). Twilight of the Gods, pp. 697.)

It has often been debated whether the Battle of Midway or the Guadalcanal campaign was the point at which the defeat of Japan by the United States became inevitable. Toll concludes that it was neither, rather the matter was decided "from the moment the first bombs dropped on Pearl Harbor". Having shown the Japanese leadership vastly underestimated both the industrial might of the United States and its will to endure and fight a war of attrition, many did foresee the outcome, but decided to embark upon war anyway. Mark Perry writes, "It was the most egregiously false assumption in the history of warfare — as Toll's trilogy eloquently shows."

== Reception ==
- In writing his review of Twilight of the Gods, in the New York Times, Mark Perry compares Toll's three volume narrative of the Pacific War with official 15 volume history written by Samuel Eliot Morison for the Navy; "While Morison's resulting 15-volume “History of United States Naval Operations in World War II” is celebrated as classic and definitive, it is neither. Rather, it is overly triumphalist — and long. Toll's trilogy is a departure: It is exhaustive and authoritative and it shows the Navy in World War II as it really was, warts and all."
- "Combining beautiful prose with the gritty and bloody realities of the island hopping strategy, Toll's third and final volume has been eagerly awaited by scholars and military history"
- Twilight of the Gods: War in the Western Pacific, 1944–1945 was a New York Times Bestseller.

=== Reviews ===
- Barrett, C. (Fall 2020). Review: Ian Toll's Third Volume, Twilight of the Gods. HistoryNET.
- Donoghue, S. (August 06, 2020). Review: Twilight of the Gods by Ian Toll. Open Letters Review: An Arts & Literature Review.
- Jamieson, W. (September 1, 2020). Book Review: Twilight of the Gods: The magisterial final volume of Ian W. Toll's Pacific War trilogy. Book & Film Globe.
- Jordan, J. W. (August 28, 2020). Twilight of the Gods Review: A Blood-Soaked Peace. The Wall Street Journal.
- Perry, M. (August 28, 2020). How the U.S. Won the War Against Japan: Book Review of Twilight of the Gods. The New York Times.

== Similar or related works ==
- Allies at War by Tim Bouverie (2025)
- The Second World War by Antony Beevor (2012).
- Inferno: The World at War, 1939-1945 by Max Hastings (2011).
- The Storm of War by Andrew Roberts (2009).

== See also ==
- Asiatic-Pacific Theater
- Atomic bombings of Hiroshima and Nagasaki
- Greater East Asia Co-Prosperity Sphere
- Imperial Japanese Army
- Imperial Japanese Navy
- Japan campaign
- Pacific Ocean theater of World War II
- Southern Expeditionary Army Group
- South West Pacific Area (command)
