= Europe at War 1939–1945: No Simple Victory =

2006 book by Norman Davies

- Author: Norman Davies
- Language: English
- Subject: World War II in Europe
- Publisher: Macmillan
- Publication date: 2006
- Publication place: United States
- Media type: Print
- Pages: ix+544
- ISBN: 9780333692851
- OCLC: 70401618

Europe at War 1939–1945: No Simple Victory is a history book about World War II in Europe, written by the English historian Norman Davies and first published by Macmillan in 2006. Published sixty years after World War II, Davies argues that a number of misconceptions about the war are still common and then sets out to address them. Two of his main claims are that, contrary to popular belief in the West, the dominant part of the conflict took place in Eastern Europe between the two totalitarian systems of the century - communism and fascism - and that Stalin's USSR was as bad as Hitler's Germany. The subtitle No Simple Victory does therefore not just refer to the losses and suffering the Allies had to endure in order to defeat the enemy, but also the difficult moral choice the Western democracies had to make when allying themselves with one criminal regime in order to defeat another.

== See also ==
- Allies at War by Tim Bouverie (2025)
- The Second World War by Antony Beevor (2012).
- Inferno: The World at War, 1939-1945 by Max Hastings (2011).
- The Storm of War by Andrew Roberts (2009).
- Historiography of World War II
