= The Conquering Tide =

Book about the Pacific war: 1942 to 1944

The Conquering Tide: War in the Pacific Islands, 1942–1944
- The Conquering Tide
- Author: Ian W. Toll
- Audio read by: P. J. Ochlan
- Language: English
- Series: The Pacific War Trilogy
- Genre: History
- Publisher: W. W. Norton & Company
- Publication date: 2015
- Publication place: United States
- Media type: Print, Kindle, Audiobook
- Pages: 656pp (hardcover); 27 hours and 22 minutes (audiobook)
- ISBN: 978-0393080643
- Preceded by: Pacific Crucible: War at Sea in the Pacific, 1941–1942 (Volume 1).
- Followed by: Twilight of the Gods: War in the Western Pacific, 1944–1945 (Volume 3).
- Website: The Conquering Tide at W. W. Norton

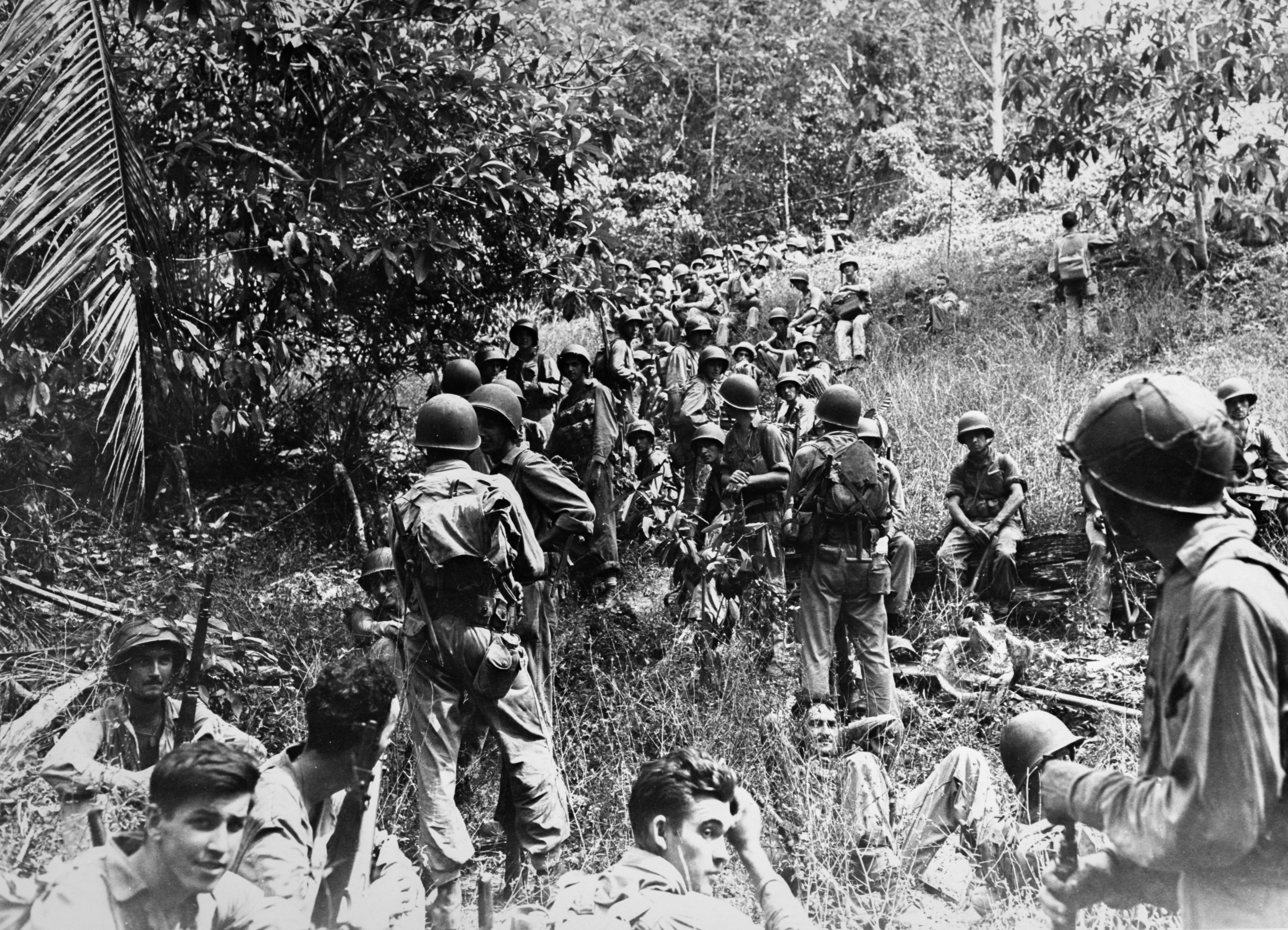
Marines rest in the field on Guadalcanal

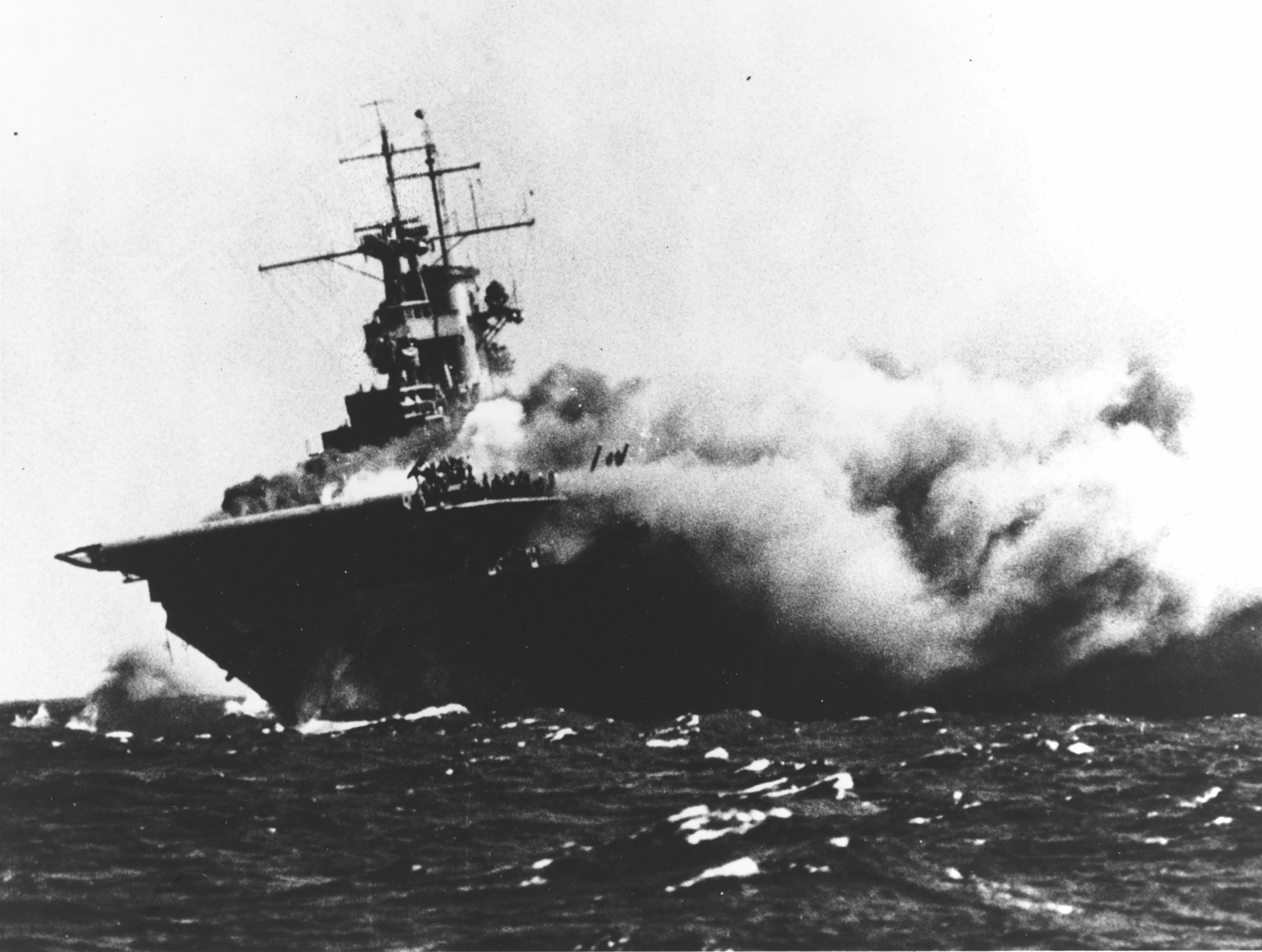
USS Wasp (CV-7) burning on 15 September 1942

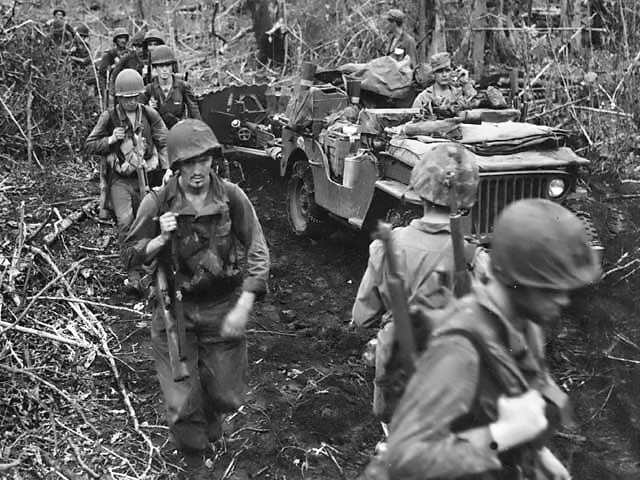
Marines during the New Guinea campaign

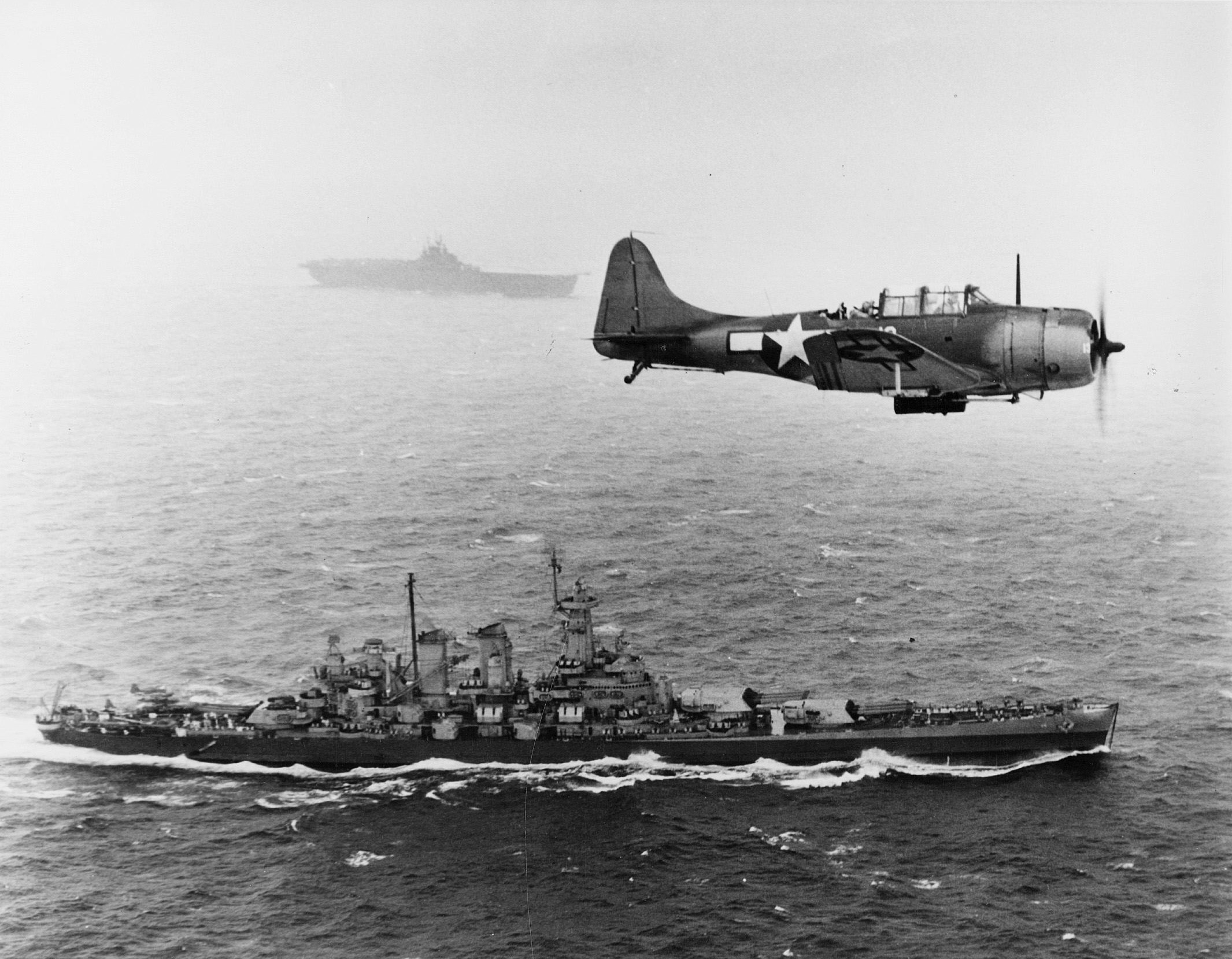
Navy Douglas Dauntless flies over the battleship USS Washington (BB-56)

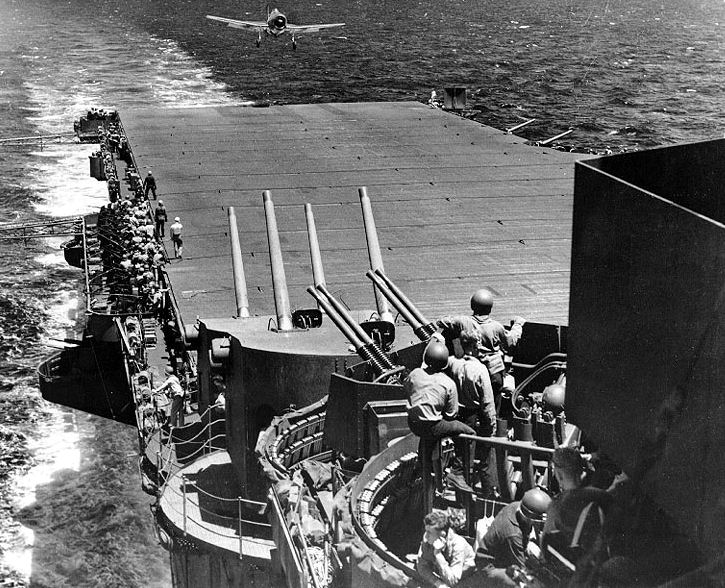
USS Lexington (CV-16) in the Philippine Sea

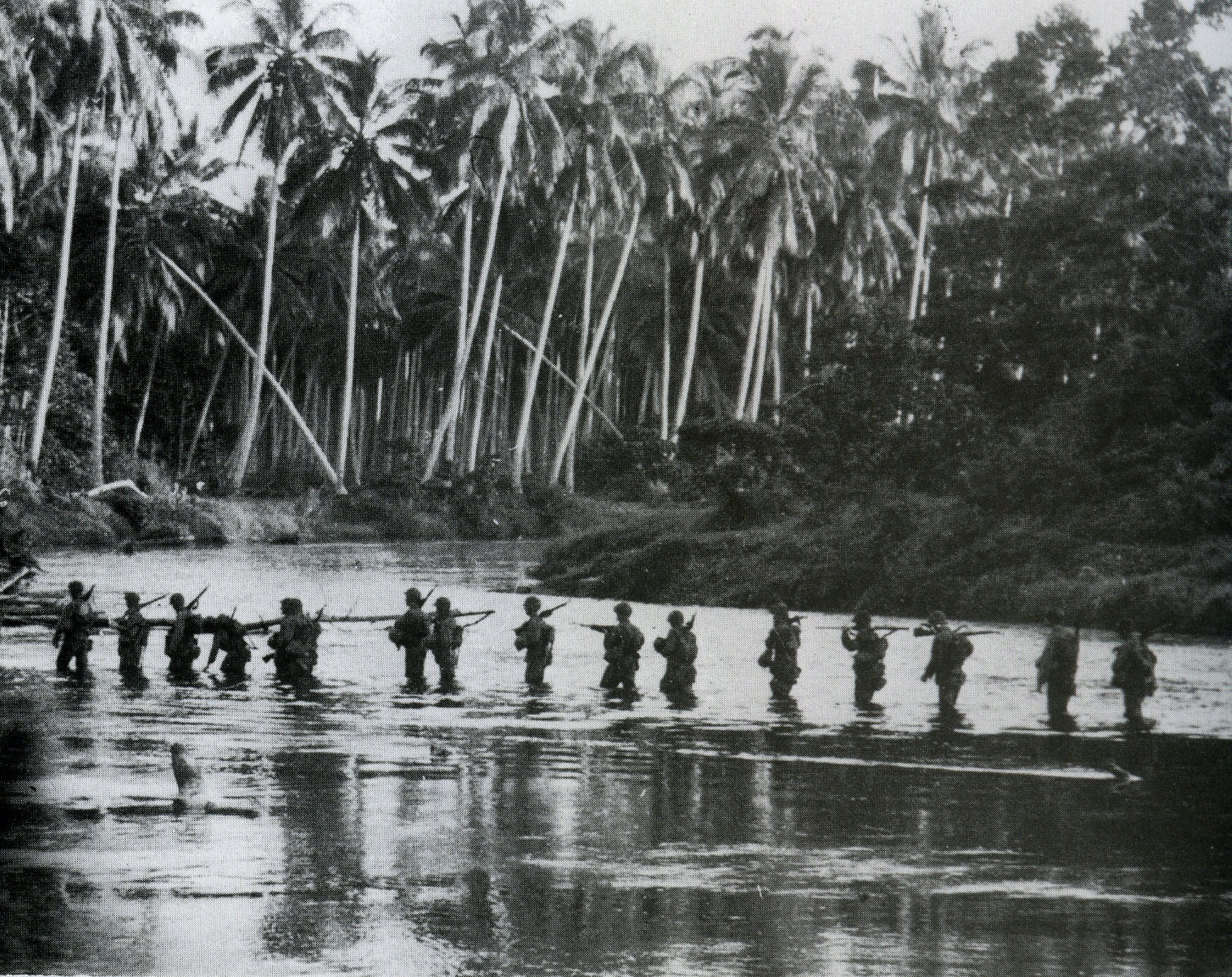
US Marines on Guadalcanal

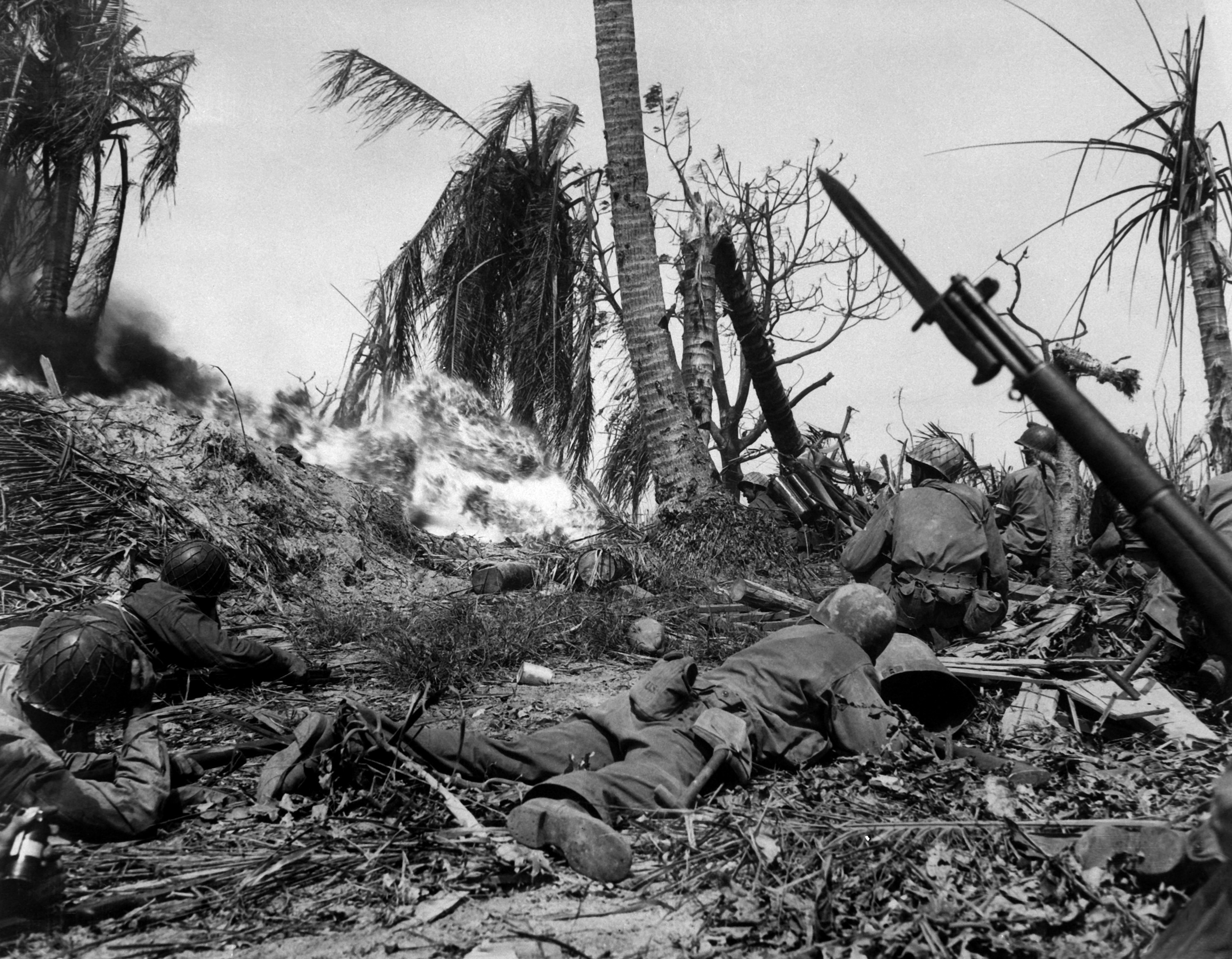
US Soldiers at the Battle of Kwajalein

The Conquering Tide: War in the Pacific Islands, 1942–1944 is the second volume in the Pacific War trilogy written by best selling author and historian Ian W. Toll. The book is a narrative history of the middle phase of the Pacific War, which took place in the central and southern Pacific between the Allies and the Empire of Japan. It was published by W. W. Norton & Company in 2015 (hardcover and Kindle) and 2016 (paperback). It was released as an audiobook narrated by P. J. Ochlan by Recorded Books in 2015. The first volume in the trilogy, Pacific Crucible: War at Sea in the Pacific, 1941–1942, was published in 2011; the final volume in the trilogy, Twilight of the Gods: War in the Western Pacific, 1944–1945, was published in 2020.

== Synopsis ==
Continuing the story of the Pacific war, The Conquering Tide covers the period from June 1942 to June 1944, a time frame that starts with the fighting during the Solomon Islands, Guadalcanal, and New Guinea campaigns, continues into the Gilbert and Marshall Islands campaign and ends with the dramatic Japanese defeats during the Mariana and Palau Islands campaign and the Battle of the Philippine Sea, which sets the stage for the final phase of the war in the approach to and on the Japanese home islands. In writing about the scope of the subject covered in The Conquering Tide, the Dallas Morning News review states,

The Pacific War was the largest, bloodiest, most costly, most technically innovative, and most logistically complex amphibious war in history. To roll back the tide of Japanese conquests, the Allies would be required to seize one island after another, advancing across thousands of miles of ocean in two huge parallel offensives on either side of the equator. The army, navy, and marines were compelled to work together in sustained and intricate cooperation. (Note: Toll, I. W. (2015). The Conquering Tide, pp. 8.)

Both a history from below, showing the perspectives of the average soldiers, sailors, and airmen that fought the war and a history from above, showing how American military leaders, especially Admiral Ernest King, planned and executed the strategy that set the stage for the final phase of the Pacific war. Toll uses both official histories and personal recollections to tell the story of this phase of the war. He weaves personal stories from the fighter pilots that fought the Japanese in the air, the sailors on board ship that encountered them at sea, and the soldiers and marines that fought them on countless islands, together with thoughts, plans, and reactions of the leaders that guided the progress of the war, to provide the reader with a compelling narrative of how the war unfolded.

Toll provides insights into the Japanese perspective of the conflict. An example of the vivid details he includes are the feelings and perspectives of normal Japanese merchant seaman; Toll recounts, "In the navy's hierarchy, recalled one veteran merchant mariner, he and his shipmates "were lower than military horses, less important than military dogs, even lower than military carrier pigeons." On one ship with a mixed crew, all merchant mariners were confined below, while only Etajima (naval academy) graduates were allowed to take in the sun and sea air on deck. "That was their attitude. There was no sense you were all fighting together. You can't win with such an attitude."" (Note: Toll, I. W. (2015). The Conquering Tide, pp. 283.) On the opposite end of the spectrum, Toll shows the growing power and dominance of General Tojo and his allies in the Japanese government, and his eventual fall from power and replacement by Kuniaki Koiso, a retired general and the Japanese proconsul in charge of Korea, who nonetheless continued Tojo's failed policies and "dutifully mouthed the same bellicose avowals and victory forecasts that had been Tojo's trademark". (Note: Toll, I. W. (2015). The Conquering Tide, pp. 535.) The many ways the Japanese had prepared for a war against the United States is explained in the first part of the book and is demonstrated throughout. Because air power was central to the fighting in the Pacific, Toll points out the often superiority of Japanese fighters and medium bombers and the skill in which Japanese pilots handled them.

As was the case in the first volume, the author shows how preconceived notions and prejudices on both sides continued to be shattered. However these lessons were learned slowly and these misconceptions led both sides to disastrous conclusions before they eventually dissolved and were replaced with more accurate, albeit incomplete and racist, assessments of the skills and abilities of their enemy. The Japanese notion of the Americans as "soft, too used to comfort to be effective in battle; not able to withstand the rigors of submarine service" and Allied notions of the Japanese as technologically second rate with poorly trained personnel proved to be costly arrogance. The Japanese held one advantage in this regard; knowing the attitude of those they were about to fight, they used this to their advantage; Toll writes, "Playing cleverly on the hubris and racial chauvinism of their Western rivals, the Japanese had disguised the formidable power of their air fleets and airmen." (Note: Toll, I. W. (2015). The Conquering Tide, pp. xxii) However Toll also quotes Japanese Admiral Kichisaburo Nomura on what would prove the most disastrous miscalculation of the war, "You came far more quickly than we expected."

After detailing the misconceptions and flaws of the two sides, the middle portion of the book largely focuses on the remarkable transformation of the American military as it island-hopped across the Pacific and the inability of the Japanese to respond effectively or understand the position they were in. Toll documents the increasing material strength of the United States, growing from a devastated Pacific battleship fleet with a few precious aircraft carriers, into a force capable of striking across the Pacific at will. He not only shows the material growth in the military but also the organizational, tactical, and strategic growth that developed in tandem with it.

Toll concludes the story with the history of the Mariana and Palau Islands campaign, the climax of the war in the central and southern Pacific which set the stage for the war in the western Pacific and Japanese home islands.

"This reviewer was particularly struck by Toll's description of the Japanese fight to the bitter end on Saipan and the decision by thousands of civilians to take their lives rather than surrender. "Despite the bitterness of defeat, we pledge 'Seven lives to repay our country' " was part of Yoshitsugu Saito's last instruction to his battered forces. "About 3,000 Japanese troops answered the call" to report to a staging point and charged down a narrow-gauge railway into the Americans in a banzai charge shortly before 5 a.m. Those who had rifles fixed bayonets, those without fixed knives or bayonets on long poles. At the rear but pressing forward was "a pathetic cavalcade of sick and wounded men, bleeding and bandaged, some hobbling along on crutches, many with no weapons at all." ... Summing up, Toll noted, "Capture of the Marianas and the accompanying ruin of Japanese carrier airpower were final and irreversible blows to the hopes of the Japanese imperial project." (Note: Toll, I. W. (2015). The Conquering Tide, pp. 504, 513)

In the final pages of the book, Toll asserts three conclusions that summarize the state of the war in mid 1944:

"That two such colossal assaults could be launched against fortified enemy shores, in the same month and at opposite ends of the Eurasian landmass was a supreme demonstration of American military–industrial hegemony." (Note: Toll, I. W. (2015). The Conquering Tide, pp. 457.)

"The Americans had developed the capability to project overwhelming force into the distant frontiers of the western Pacific, and no tactical masterstroke or blunder could reverse the increasingly lopsided balance of power between the two combatants." (Note: Toll, I. W. (2015). The Conquering Tide, pp. 515)

Just as Toll concludes his first volume with the earlier decisive Battle of Midway in the eastern Pacific, in the conclusion of this volume he makes the convincing argument that the victory in the Marianas was the decisive moment in the Pacific War. "Though Americans were slow to appreciate it they had just won the decisive victory of the Pacific War." (Note: Toll, I. W. (2015). The Conquering Tide, pp. 513.)

== Reception ==
- "On the American side, Toll's narrative deftly moves between the towering figures – King, Nimitz, Halsey, Holland Smith, and deck-plate sailors and Marines who "do not know how many of the Japanese civilians [italics in text] will actively fight us." He weaves the Japanese narrative in a similarly efficient and coherent way. Conquering Tide is not a Navy and Marine battle action history. It is a compelling account from the biggest of pictures of the "Europe first" strategy to the tiniest of pixels to help readers born years and decades after these events understand what happened, why it occurred, and ultimately what it all meant at the time to the Americans and Japanese."
- "The writing has a very visual aspect, yet the details do not overwhelm the reader, nor does the well‐organized and documented narrative. Told from the points of view of different military and political perspectives covering both sides of the war, plus allied concerns, the story never gets lost as it progresses through the period included. The battle stories include human stories and anecdotes from those not necessarily heard from, including those in the foxholes. Attitudes are explained with ease and controversies covered."
- "The Conquering Tide is heavily researched and spans nearly 600 pages. Yet Toll's absorbing text flows smoothly and quickly, helped along by anecdotes and stories involving combatants and political leaders on both sides, plus coast watchers who spied on the Japanese from mountaintops and jungles and risked their lives to radio attack warnings."

The Conquering Tide was a New York Times best selling non-fiction book.

=== Reviews ===
- Borneman, W. R. (October 5, 2015). Book Review: The Conquering Tide by Ian W. Toll. The New York Times.
- Grady, J. (2012). Book Review: The Conquering Tide: War in the Pacific Islands, 1942–1944 by Ian W. Toll. Naval Historical Foundation.
- Jordan, J. W. (October 2, 2015). The Grueling Archipelago. The Wall Street Journal.
- Moore, R. (2016). The Conquering Tide: War in the Pacific Islands, 1942–1944 By Ian W. Toll. Army History, (100), pp. 39–40.
- Reist, K. K. (2017) The Conquering Tide: War in the Pacific Islands, 1942–1944 By Ian W. Toll. The Historian, 79(3), pp. 663–664.
- Sears, D. L. (Spring 2016). Book Review: The Conquering Tide: War in the Pacific Islands, 1942–1944. HistoryNET.
- Staff Editor. (September 25, 2015). History review: The Conquering Tide: War in the Pacific Islands, 1942-1944 by Ian W. Toll. The Dallas Morning News.

== Similar or related works ==
- Allies at War by Tim Bouverie (2025)
- The Second World War by Antony Beevor (2012).
- Inferno: The World at War, 1939-1945 by Max Hastings (2011).
- The Storm of War by Andrew Roberts (2009).

== See also ==
- Asiatic-Pacific Theater
- Greater East Asia Co-Prosperity Sphere
- Imperial Japanese Army
- Imperial Japanese Navy
- Pacific Ocean theater of World War II
- Southern Expeditionary Army Group
- South West Pacific Area (command)

== Notes ==
When quotes from the book appear in referenced secondary sources, the pages they are from are noted below for reference; the first hardcover edition is cited.
