= Pacific Crucible =

Book about the Pacific War: 1941 to 1942

Pacific Crucible: War at Sea in the Pacific, 1941–1942
- Pacific Crucible
- Author: Ian W. Toll
- Audio read by: Grover Gardner
- Language: English
- Series: The Pacific War Trilogy
- Genre: History
- Publisher: W. W. Norton & Company
- Publication date: 2011
- Publication place: United States
- Media type: Print, Kindle, Audiobook
- Pages: 640pp (hardcover); 22 hrs and 6 mins (audiobook)
- ISBN: 978-0-393-34341-0
- Followed by: The Conquering Tide: War in the Pacific Islands, 1942-1944 (Volume 2).
- Website: Pacific Crucible at W. W. Norton

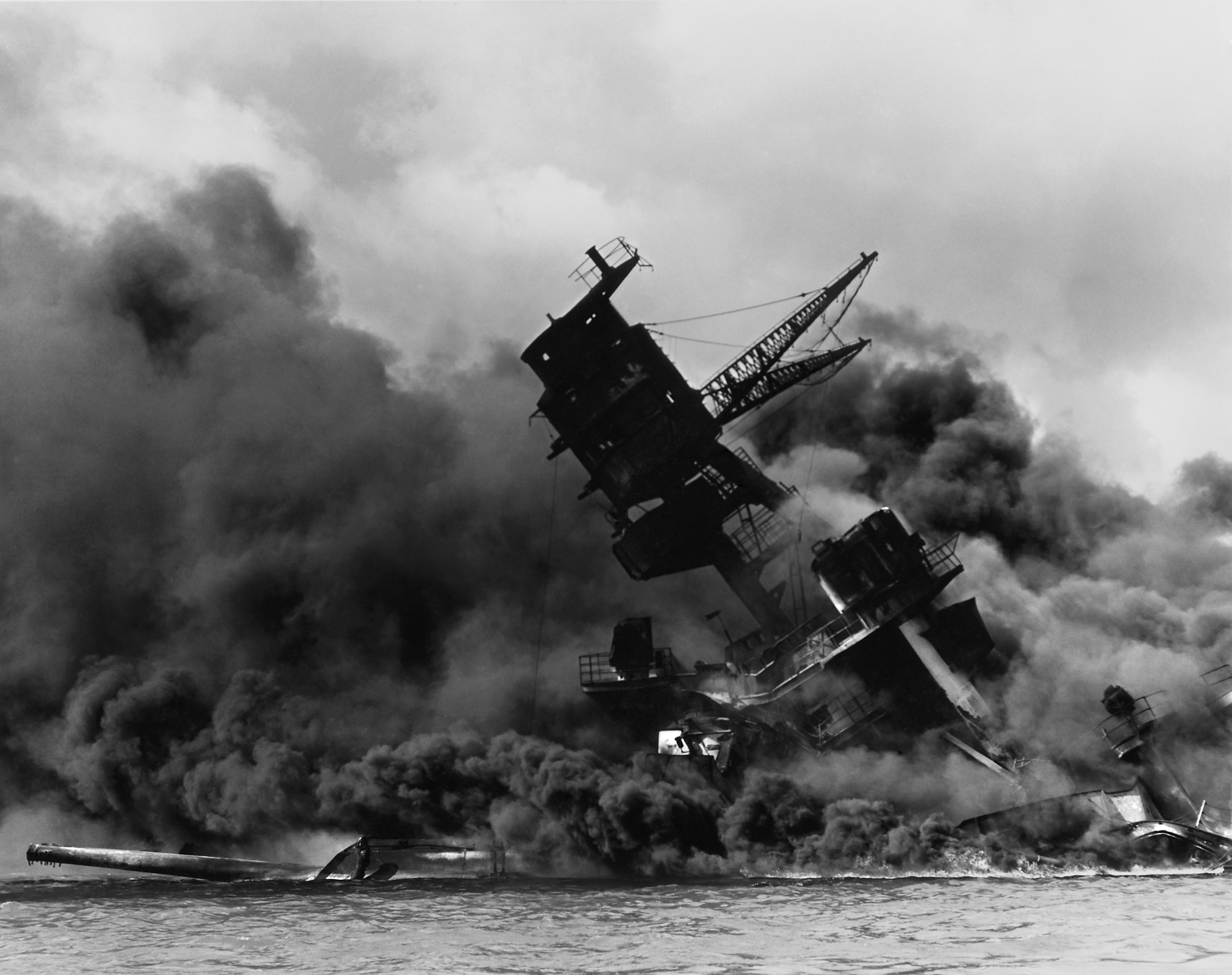
The USS Arizona (BB-39) after the Japanese attack on Pearl Harbor

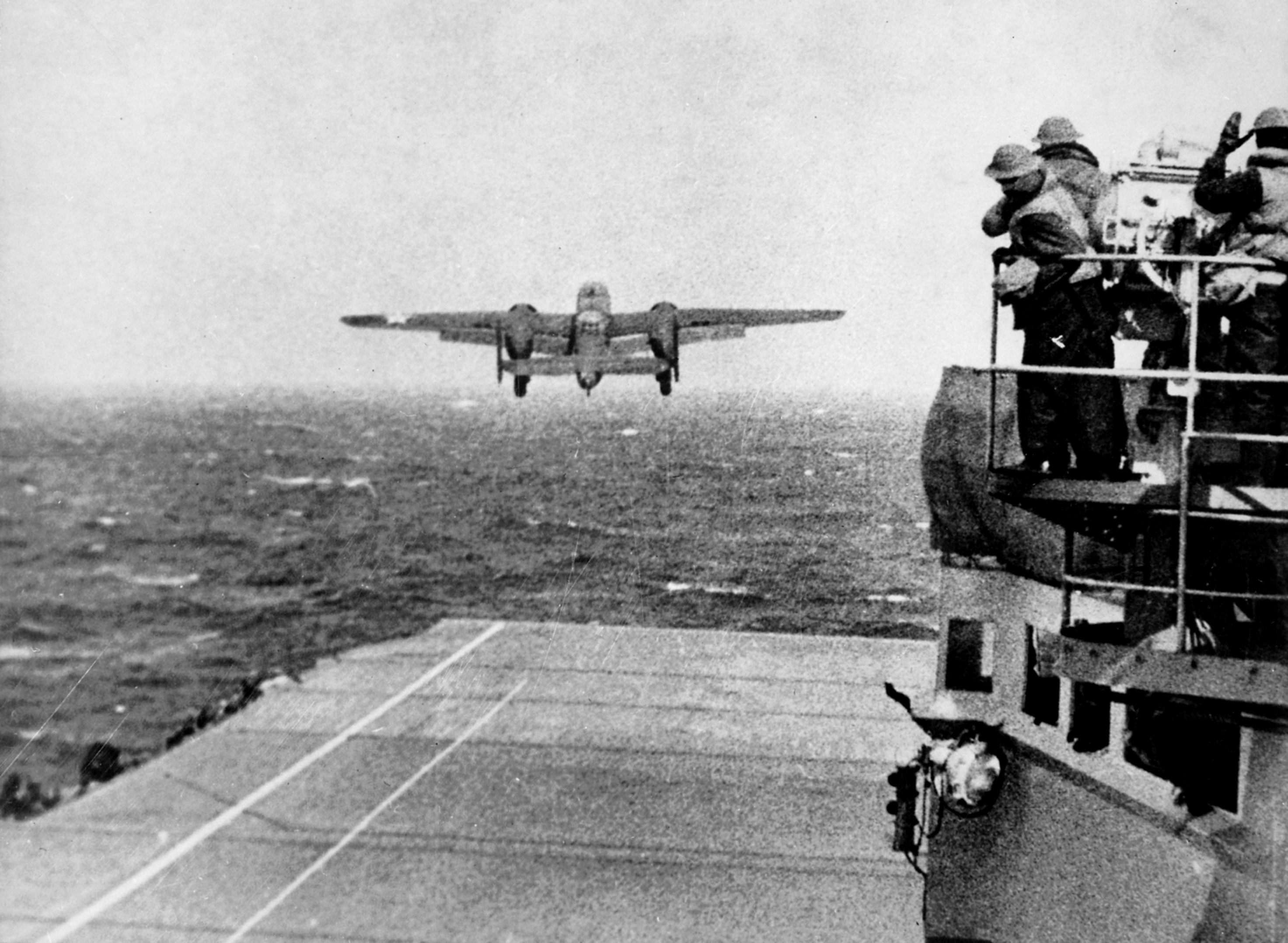
Army B-25 on the Doolittle Raid

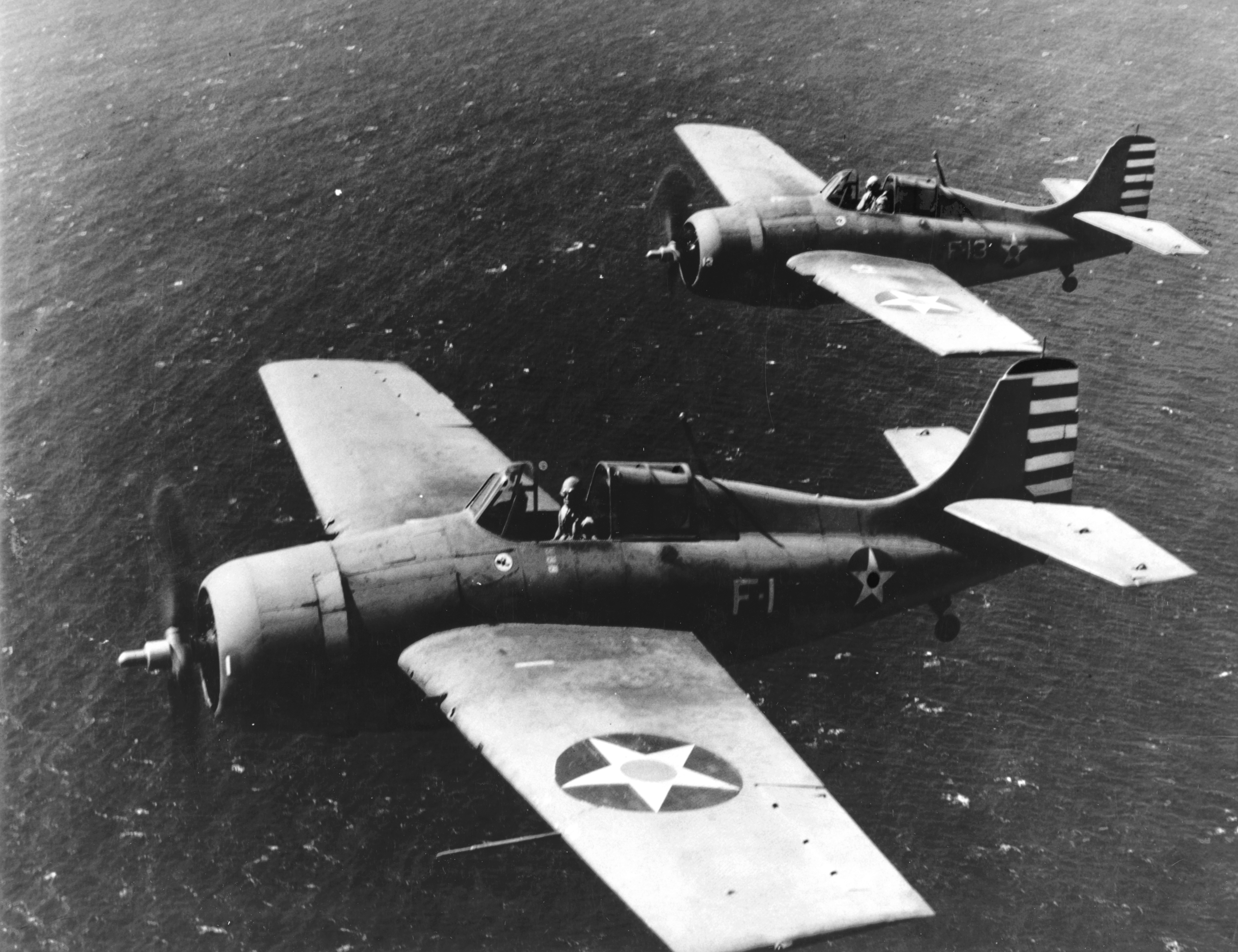
Grumman F4F-3 Wildcats in flight off Oahu

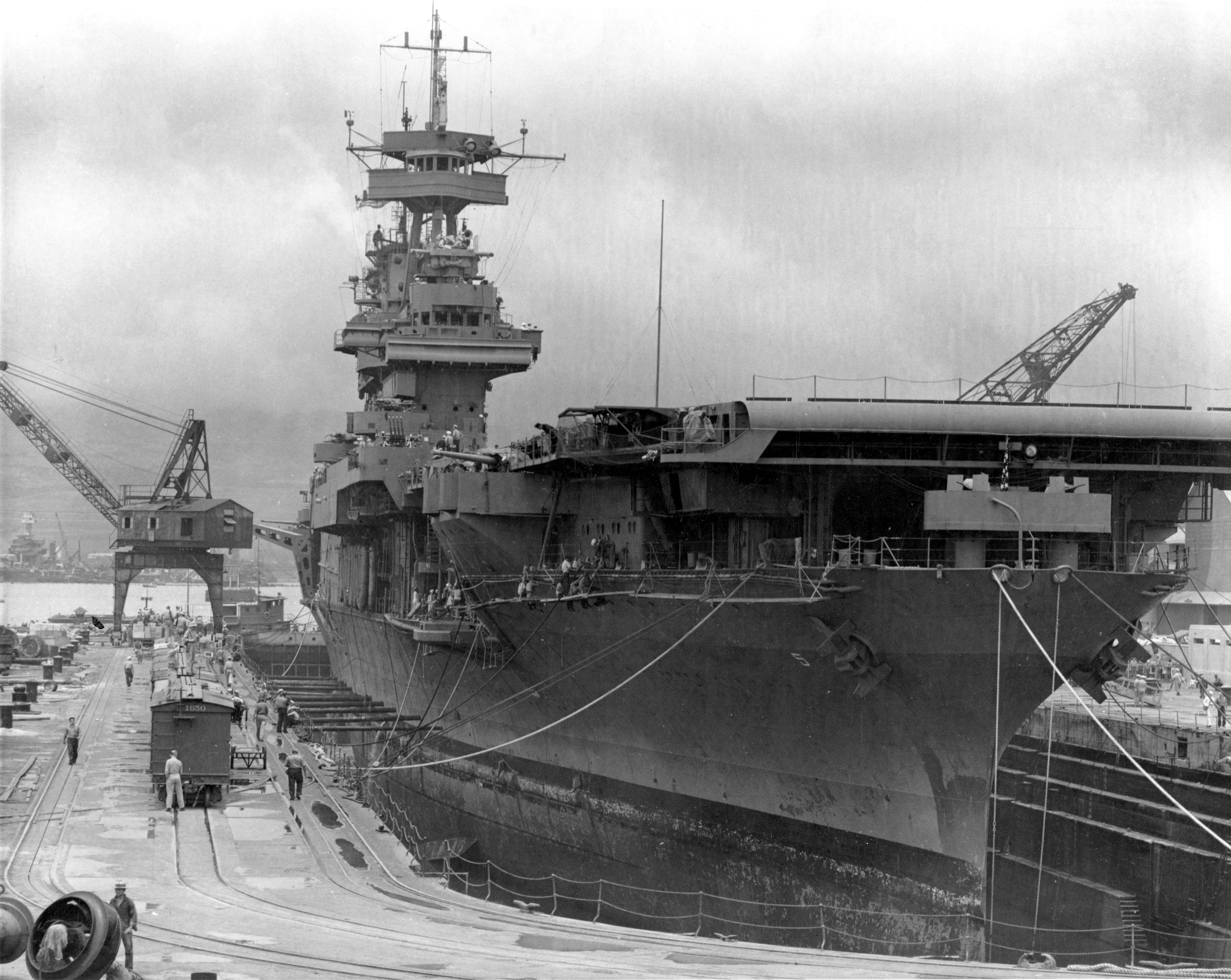
USS Yorktown (CV-5) at the Pearl Harbor Shipyard, 29 May 1942

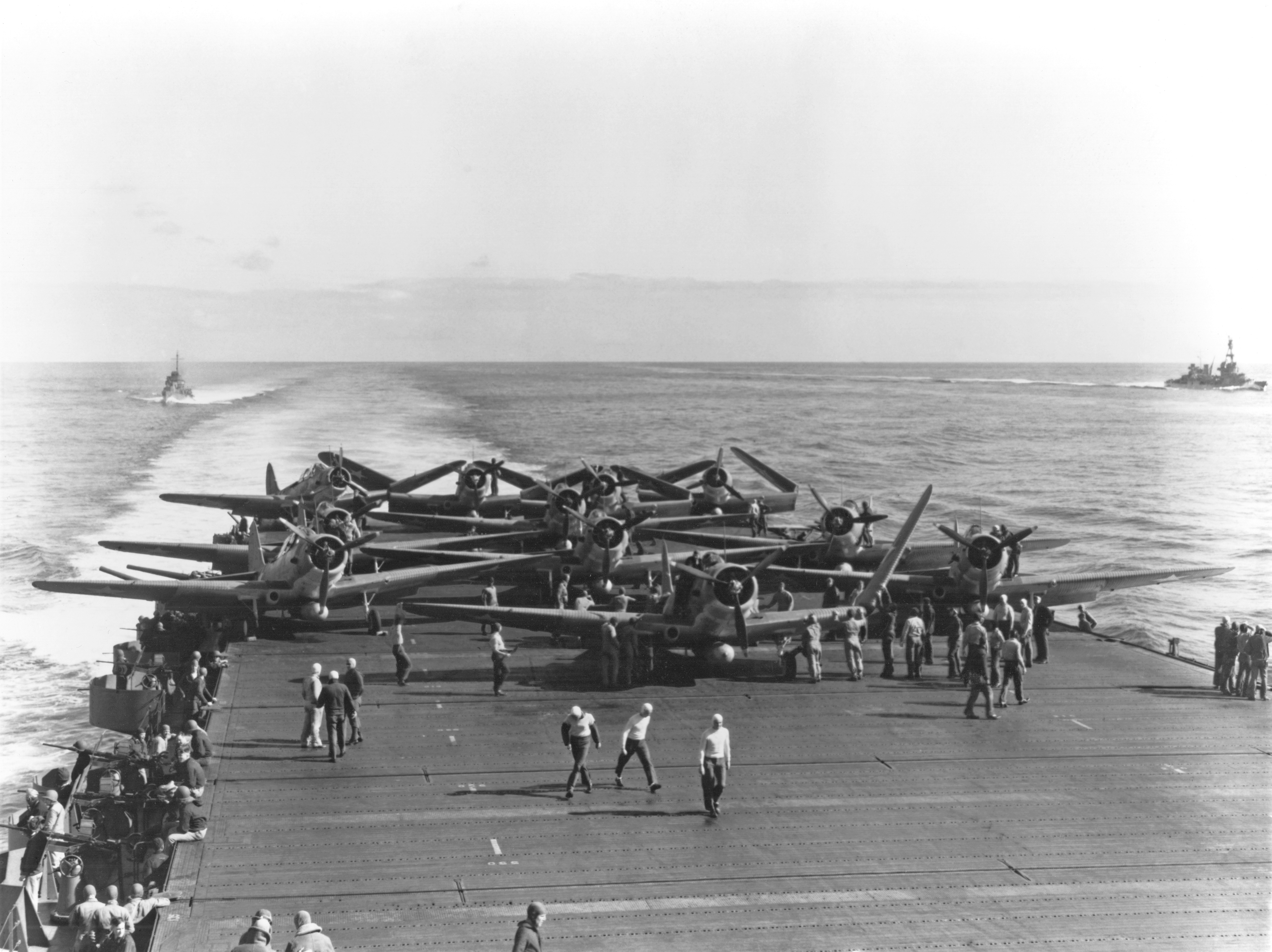
Douglas TBD-1 Devastators aboard USS Enterprise

Pacific Crucible: War at Sea in the Pacific, 1941–1942 is the first volume in the Pacific War trilogy, written by historian Ian W. Toll. The book is a narrative history of the opening phase of the Pacific War, which took place in the eastern Pacific between the Allies and the Empire of Japan. It was published by W. W. Norton & Company in 2011 (hardcover and Kindle) and 2012 (paperback) and was released as an audiobook narrated by Grover Gardner by Audible Studios in 2011. The following volume in the trilogy, The Conquering Tide: War in the Pacific Islands, 1942–1944, was published in 2014; the final volume in the trilogy, Twilight of the Gods: War in the Western Pacific, 1944–1945, was published in 2020.

== Synopsis ==
Pacific Crucible covers the period from December 1941 to June 1942, a time frame that starts with the successful Japanese Attack on Pearl Harbor and ends with the dramatic Japanese defeat at the Battle of Midway. In between the author weaves into the story chapter length biographies of key well known individuals such as Admirals Chester W. Nimitz and Ernest King, along with lesser known individuals such as Joseph Rochefort and Thomas Dyer while telling the story of Station Hypo, the code breaking team they led. Toll recounts the stunning Japanese blitzkrieg in the South Pacific that followed Pearl Harbor, the tentative small-scale clashes between the United States and Japan that followed, and the Battle of the Coral Sea, which set the stage for the Japanese defeat at Midway.

The book primarily tells the story from the American point of view, but the author does not leave out details about the Japanese leadership, goals, strategy, and tactics or those of the American allies such as Britain and Australia. Chapters 3 and 4 provide the reader with a background of recent Japanese history, the circumstances and American interest surrounding the Second Sino-Japanese War, and the military culture and Army–Navy rivalry that helped lead Japan into conflict with its neighbors. Toll provides another mini-biography of Isoroku Yamamoto, the admiral that planned and led the attacks on Pearl Harbor and Midway.

The book pays particular attention to the often contentious relationship between the military leadership of the United States and Britain and their often conflicting viewpoints. Today, knowing the outcome of the war, it's easy not to understand the uncertainties of 1941–42; Toll does an excellent job of conveying to the reader the real-life drama and uncertainty of the time and events he describes. The book concludes with the drama of the battle of Midway and why it became a turning point in the Pacific war. Michael Beschloss writes, "As Toll rightly asserts in his book's final pages, Midway exposed a central tension that would govern the remaining three years of the Pacific conflict: "Japan's transcendent 'fighting spirit' was to be pitted against America's overwhelming industrial-military might."

Pacific Crucible takes the reader through the course of events that led to the eclipse of the battleship with the age of the aircraft carrier. Toll traces the development of naval war strategy from the thinking of Alfred Thayer Mahan in the late 19th century, through the development of the war plans for the Pacific region in both the United States and Japan between the World Wars, up to the opening stages of World War II. Toll then describes how events led military leaders in the United States, Britain, and Japan to reassess the role of battleships, large fleet encounters, and most importantly the role of airpower in naval conflicts.

Finally, Toll reveals how the Japanese completely underestimated American resolve to fight a long war in the Pacific. In writing about Japanese attitudes in the opening phase of the war, Toll writes, "The Japanese people were rapidly succumbing to what would later be called shoribyo, or 'victory disease' – a faith that Japan was invincible, and could afford to treat its enemies with contempt. Its symptoms were overconfidence, a failure to weigh risks properly, and a basic misunderstanding of the enemy." (Note: Toll, The Pacific Crucible, pp.271.) He demonstrates how the rapid events of the first six months of the war led to the slow war of attrition that followed in the next three years, which ultimately provided the United States the time it needed to develop the industrial, technical, and scientific means to defeat Japan.

== Reception ==
Writing in The New York Times about Toll's skill at crafting compelling narratives with interesting mini-biographies, Michael Beschloss writes, "Toll has an affinity for the detailed narrative of military conflict and for capsule portraiture of key personalities both high-ranking and low. Here, his effort to provide historical recognition where it is due extends to the subject of the Pacific War itself, which – even as it was unfolding, and certainly now – has too often been eclipsed by the struggle against Hitler and Mussolini in Europe and North Africa. Toll has an affinity for the detailed narrative of military conflict and for capsule portraiture of key personalities both high-ranking and low. Toll is especially skilled at setting his story in context, taking the reader on valuable excursions into subjects like the impact of Alfred Thayer Mahan’s views on naval strategy and the history of Japanese expansionism. He effectively conveys the gloom of the Allies over Japan’s dominance in Asia and the Pacific in the spring of 1942: "The Japanese offensive had made a mockery of their predictions, deranged their plans, sapped their morale, undercut their leaders’ reputations and torn at the seams of their global coalition." Andrew Wiese writes in The San Diego Union-Tribune, "Among Toll’s paramount achievements is his skill in weaving events across a wide scale into a coherent, compelling narrative. Toll combines the grand and the mundane from the halls of government to the lower decks: the naval tactics of Alfred Thayer Mahan, great power diplomacy and Japanese politics, as well as blackout nights in Hawaii, salt water showers and canned Spam." Rear Admiral Richard Gentz writes in his review for the Naval Historical Foundation, "Toll pulls it all together with logic and vivid word pictures of the action." The book was the winner of the Northern California Book Award for Nonfiction in 2012.

=== Reviews ===
- Beschloss, M. (November 25, 2011). In the Air, On the Sea: Book Review of Pacific Crucible by Ian W. Toll. The New York Times.
- Gentz, R. (2012). Book Review. Naval Historical Foundation.
- Kingseed, C. (2012). Book Review The Historian, 74(3), 602-603.
- Spector, R. (November 26, 2011). When We Were The Underdogs. The Wall Street Journal.
- Wiese, A. (December 4, 2011). ‘Pacific Crucible’ captures a very human WWII. The San Diego Union-Tribune.

== Similar or related works ==
- Allies at War by Tim Bouverie (2025)
- The Second World War by Antony Beevor (2012).
- Inferno: The World at War, 1939-1945 by Max Hastings (2011).
- The Storm of War by Andrew Roberts (2009).

== See also ==
- Asiatic-Pacific Theater
- Coastwatchers
- Greater East Asia Co-Prosperity Sphere
- Imperial Japanese Army
- Imperial Japanese Navy
- Pacific Ocean theater of World War II
- Philippines campaign (1941–1942)
- Southern Expeditionary Army Group
- South West Pacific Area (command)
- Composition of the Pacific Fleet in December 1941
