= Mariana and Palau Islands campaign =

United States military campaign during World War II

- Part of the Pacific War and World War II
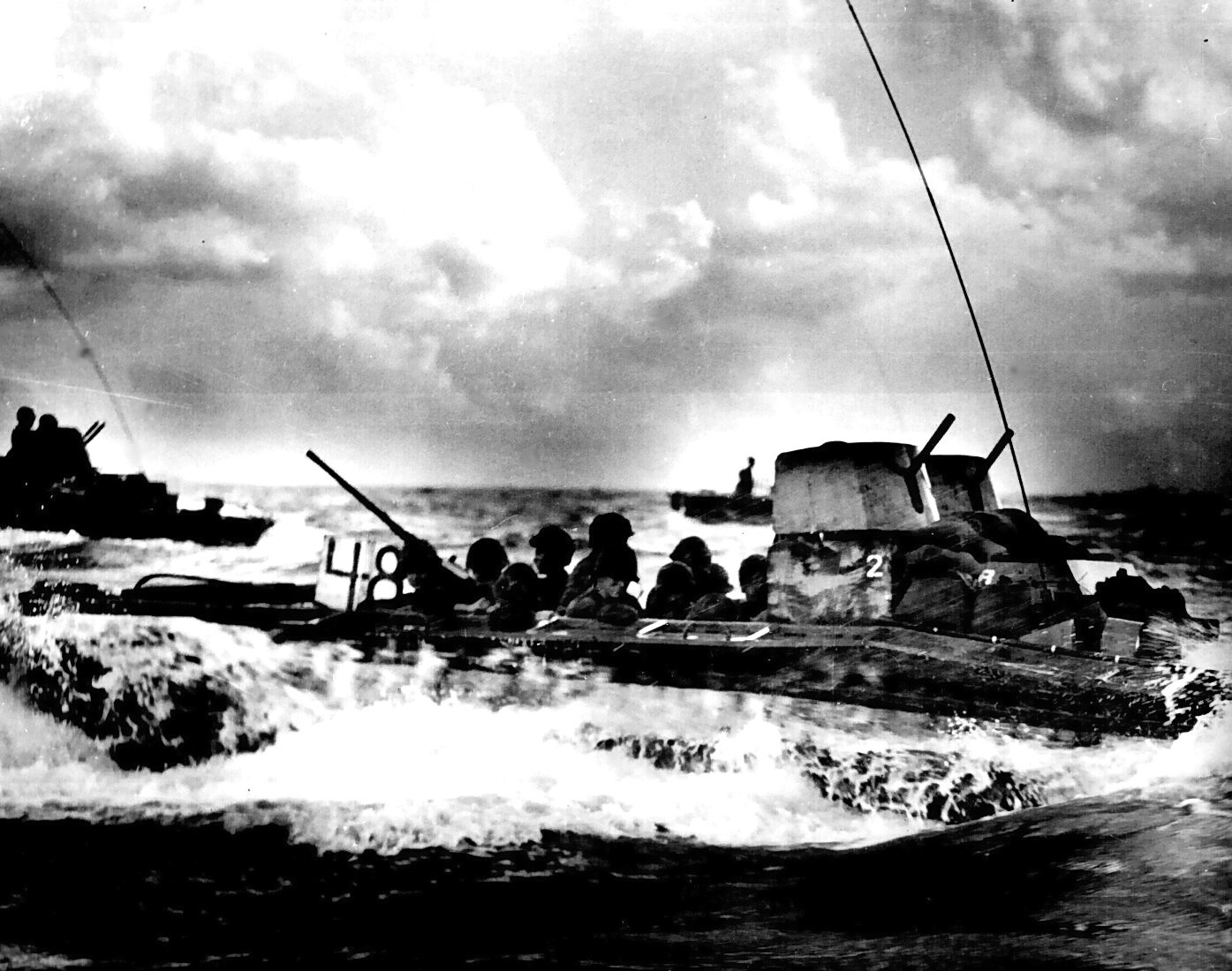
- A U.S. LVT loaded with Marines approaches Tinian during the U.S. landings on that island.
Date	June – November 1944
Location	Mariana and Palau Islands, Pacific Ocean
Result	American victory

Belligerents
United States	Japan

Commanders and leaders
Chester W. Nimitz; Raymond A. Spruance; Richmond K. Turner; Holland Smith; Roy Geiger; Harry Schmidt; William H. Rupertus; Paul J. Mueller	Yoshitsugu Saitō ‡‡; Chūichi Nagumo ‡‡; Jisaburō Ozawa; Kakuji Kakuta ‡‡; Takeshi Takashina †; Hideyoshi Obata ‡‡; Kiyochi Ogata ‡‡; Sadae Inoue; Kunio Nakagawa ‡‡

Strength
128,000; 600+ ships	71,000

Casualties and losses
8,125 killed and missing	Over 67,000 casualties

Granite II (Mariana and Palau Islands campaign)
Operation Forager
Operation Stalemate
Operation Causeway (cancelled)

The Mariana and Palau Islands campaign, also known as Campaign Plan Granite II, was an offensive launched by the United States against Imperial Japanese forces in the Pacific between June and November 1944 during the Pacific War. The campaign consisted of Operation Forager, which captured the Mariana Islands, and Operation Stalemate, which captured Palau. Operation Causeway, an invasion of Japanese-controlled Taiwan, was also planned but not executed. The offensive, under the overall command of Chester W. Nimitz, followed the Gilbert and Marshall Islands campaign and was intended to neutralize Japanese bases in the central Pacific, support the Allied drive to retake the Philippines, and provide bases for a strategic bombing campaign against Japan.

The United States assembled a significant combined arms task force to undertake the campaign. The Fifth Fleet was commanded by Admiral Raymond A. Spruance. Task Force 58, commanded by Vice Admiral Marc Mitscher, consisted of 15 carriers, 7 battleships, 11 cruisers, 86 destroyers and over 900 planes. The amphibious invasion force, commanded by Vice Admiral Richmond K. Turner, consisted of 56 attack transports, 84 landing craft and over 127,000 troops.

At the beginning of the campaign, United States Marine Corps and United States Army forces, with support from the United States Navy, executed landings on Saipan in June 1944. In response, the Imperial Japanese Navy's Combined Fleet sortied to attack the U.S. Navy force supporting the landings. In the resulting Battle of the Philippine Sea (also known as the "Great Marianas Turkey Shoot") on 19–20 June, the Japanese naval forces were decisively defeated with heavy and irreplaceable losses to their carrier-borne and land-based aircraft.

Prior to the landings in the Forager invasion (Guam and Tinian) Operation Wedlock, a phantom diversion campaign was taking place. The increased radio traffic, starting in October 1943, purported a I Alaskan Corps preparing to invade the Kurile island group. A joint army/navy radio task force was established at Adak, Alaska to push out the fake radio traffic to the equally fictitious IX Amphibious Force and 9th US Fleet.

U.S. forces landed on Saipan in June 1944 and on Guam and Tinian in July 1944. After heavy fighting, Saipan was secured in July and Guam and Tinian in August 1944. The U.S. then constructed airfields on Saipan and Tinian from which B-29s were able to conduct strategic bombing missions against the Japanese home islands until the end of World War II, including the nuclear attacks on Hiroshima and Nagasaki.

In the meantime, in order to secure the flank for U.S. forces preparing to attack Japanese forces in the Philippines, U.S. Marine and Army forces landed on the islands of Peleliu and Angaur in Palau in September 1944. After heavy fighting, both islands were finally secured by U.S. forces in November 1944, while the main Japanese garrison in the Palaus on Koror was bypassed altogether, only to surrender in August 1945 with the Japan's capitulation.

Following their landings in the Mariana and Palau Islands, Allied forces continued their ultimately successful campaign against Japan by landing in the Philippines in October 1944 and the Volcano and Ryukyu Islands beginning in February 1945.

== Operations ==
- Battle of Saipan, 15 June – 9 July 1944
- Battle of Guam, 21 July – 10 August 1944
- Battle of Tinian, 24 July – 1 August 1944
- Battle of Peleliu, 15 September – 27 November 1944
- Battle of Angaur, 17 September – 22 October 1944

== See also ==
- West Loch disaster

== Bibliography ==
=== Books ===
- D'Albas, Andrieu (1965). Death of a Navy: Japanese Naval Action in World War II. Devin-Adair Pub. ISBN 0-8159-5302-X.
- Denfeld, D. Colt (1997). Hold the Marianas: The Japanese Defense of the Mariana Islands. White Mane Pub. ISBN 1-57249-014-4.
- Drea, Edward J. (1998). "An Allied Interpretation of the Pacific War". In the Service of the Emperor: Essays on the Imperial Japanese Army. Nebraska: University of Nebraska Press. ISBN 0-8032-1708-0.
- Dull, Paul S. (1978). A Battle History of the Imperial Japanese Navy, 1941–1945. Naval Institute Press. ISBN 0-87021-097-1.
- Gailey, Harry (1988). The Liberation of Guam 21 July–10 August. Novato, CA: Presidio Press. ISBN 0-89141-651-X.
- Gailey, Harry (1984). Peleliu: 1944. Nautical & Aviation Pub Co of Amer. ISBN 0-933852-41-X.
- Goldberg, Harold J. (2007). D-day in the Pacific: The Battle of Saipan. Indiana University Press. ISBN 978-0-253-34869-2.
- Hallas, James H. (1994). The Devil's Anvil: The Assault on Peleliu. Praeger Publishers. ISBN 0-275-94646-0.
- Hornfischer, James D. (2016). The Fleet at Flood Tide: The U.S. at Total War in the Pacific, 1944–1945. Random House Publishing Group. ISBN 978-0345548726.
- Morison, Samuel Eliot (2001) [1953]. New Guinea and the Marianas, March 1944–August 1944. History of United States Naval Operations in World War II. Vol. 8 (reissue ed.). Champaign: University of Illinois Press. ISBN 0-252-07038-0.
- O'Brien, Francis A. (2003). Battling for Saipan. Presidio Press. ISBN 0-89141-804-0.
- Ross, Bill D. (1991). Peleliu: Tragic Triumph. Random House. ISBN 0-394-56588-6.
- Rottman, Gordon (2004). Saipan & Tinian 1944: Piercing the Japanese Empire. Campaign 137. illustrated by Howard Gerrard. Oxford: Osprey Publishing. ISBN 1-84176-804-9.
- Moran, Jim; Rottman, Gordon (2002). Peleliu 1944: The Forgotten Corner of Hell. Campaign 110. illustrated by Howard Gerrard. Oxford: Osprey Publishing. ISBN 1-84176-512-0.
- Sloan, Bill (2005). Brotherhood of Heroes: The Marines at Peleliu, 1944: The Bloodiest Battle of the Pacific War. Simon & Schuster. ISBN 0-7432-6009-0.
- Smith, Douglas V. (2006). Carrier Battles: Command Decision in Harm's Way. U.S. Naval Institute Press. ISBN 1-59114-794-8.
- Toll, Ian W. (2015). The Conquering Tide: War in the Pacific Islands, 1942–1944. New York: W.W. Norton.
- Wright, Derrick (2005). To the Far Side of Hell: The Battle for Peleliu, 1944. Fire Ant Books. ISBN 0-8173-5281-3.

=== Reports ===
- Headquarters of the Commander in Chief of the United States Pacific Fleet and Pacific Ocean Area (1944). Campaign Plan Granite II (PDF) (Report). Archived from the original (PDF) on 7 March 2024.

=== Web ===
- Chen, C. Peter, "The Marianas and the Great Turkey Shoot", World War II Database
- Dyer, George Carroll, The Amphibians Came to Conquer: The Story of Admiral Richmond Kelly Turner, United States Government Printing Office – via Hyperwar Foundation
- Chapin, John C. (1994), Breaching the Marianas: The Battle for Saipan, Marines in World War II Commemorative Series, History and Museums Division, USMC
- Hoffman, Major Carl W. USMC (1950), "Saipan: The Beginning of the End", USMC Historical Monograph, Historical Branch, United States Marine Corps – via Hyperwar Foundation
- Anderson, Charles R. (2003). Western Pacific. U.S. Army Campaigns of World War II. United States Army Center of Military History. CMH Pub 72-29. Archived from the original on 3 January 2008.
- Lodge, O.R. (1954), "USMC Historical Monograph: The Recapture of Guam", Historical Branch, United States Marine Corps
- O'Brien, Cyril J. (1994), "Liberation: Marines in the Recapture of Guam", Marine Corps Historical Center, Marines in World War II Commemorative Series, United States Marine Corps
- Hoffman, Carl W. (1951), "USMC Historical Monograph: The Seizure of Tinian", Historical Branch, United States Marine Corps
- Chen, C. Peter (2007), "Palau Islands and Ulithi Islands Campaign", World War II Database
- Gayle, Gordon D. (1996). "Bloody Beaches: The Marines at Peleliu". Marines in World War II Commemorative Series. Marine Corps Historical Center. Archived from the original on 1 January 2007.
- Hough, Frank O. (1950), "The Assault on Peleliu (The Seizure of Peleliu)", USMC Historical Monograph, Historical Branch, G-3 Division, Headquarters, U.S. Marine Corps – via Hyperwar Foundation
- Smith, Robert Ross (1996), "The Approach to the Philippines", United States Army in World War II: The War in the Pacific, United States Army Center of Military History – via Hyperwar Foundation
- "G-3 journal : Expeditionary Troops Task Force 56 : Forager. S.l.", Fleet Marine Force. G-3 Section, United States Marine Corps, 1944, archived from the original on 30 September 2018
