= Six Frigates =

2006 history book by Ian W. Toll

Six Frigates: The Epic History of Founding of the US Navy
- Author: Ian W. Toll
- Language: English
- Subject: Founding of the United States Navy
- Publisher: W. W. Norton & Company
- Publication date: 2006
- Publication place: United States
- Pages: 560
- Awards: Colby Award, Samuel Eliot Morison Award for Naval Literature
- ISBN: 0393058476

Six Frigates: The Epic History of the Founding of the U.S. Navy is a book by Ian W. Toll, which was published by Norton in 2006. The book is a history of the original six frigates of the U.S. Navy.

== Awards ==
In 2007, Six Frigates won the Samuel Eliot Morison Award for Naval Literature and the William E. Colby Military Writers' Award.
