= The Pacific War and Contingent Victory =

WWII history by Michael W. Myers (2015)

The Pacific War and Contingent Victory: Why Japanese Defeat Was Not Inevitable
- Author: Michael W. Myers
- Language: English
- Genre: Military history
- Publisher: University Press of Kansas
- Publication date: 2015
- Publication place: United States
- Pages: 240

The Pacific War and Contingent Victory: Why Japanese Defeat Was Not Inevitable is a 2015 non-fiction book by Michael W. Myers, written as part of the Modern War Studies series by the University Press of Kansas.

== Premise ==
In The Pacific War and Contingent Victory, Myers argues against the dominant belief that the economic and industrial superiority of the United States made Japan's defeat in World War II an inevitability. The book proposes an invasion of Australia and Hawaii, or the United States negotiating a peace settlement due to war exhaustion as two scenarios that could have allowed Japan to avoid defeat in the war.

== Reception ==
H-Net writer Owen Flanagan gave praise to the book for its ability to effectively challenge conventional historiography, describing it as "a well-researched, beautifully written, and very useful study". While noting Myers' "wonderful writing skills", Flanagan criticised its latter half and its focus on the shortcomings of the Allied Powers, which he felt wasn't properly developed in its arguments compared to the rest of the book.

Writing for the Naval War College Review, Lewis Bernstein described The Pacific War and Contingent Victory as a "greatly flawed book", and called its central argument a "mixture of wishful thinking and scholarly ignorance of the field." He suggested that the opportunities given by Myers were not realistic, as Japan's failure to occupy either Port Moresby or the Battle of the Coral Sea forcibly put them on the defensive. Bernstein went on to suggest that "the author fundamentally misunderstands the nature of maritime warfare", and that he "places too much emphasis on armies", who Bernstein argued have no strategic use without proper aerial and naval support.

In the Michigan War Studies Review, Grant Jones criticised the book for neglecting to mention the Two-Ocean Navy Act and the development of the atomic bomb, and argued that Japan's inadequate pilot training and methods of anti-submarine warfare contradicted Myers's thesis that Japan had planned to fight a long-term war, but otherwise noted that "serious students of the Second World War will find The Pacific War and Contingent Victory well worth careful study, whether or not they are persuaded by all of Michael Myers's provocative arguments." In Army History, Bob Seals argued that Myers "seems to overstate his case" for the reason that all warfare could be described as contingent. He noted that the book provided an adequate explanation of the Pacific conflict in 150 pages, and that its use of codenames and maps would help orient readers who were unfamiliar with the subject material. He suggested that the book was "of limited interest to a general audience, but it should be useful to anyone interested in strategic planning, or those relatively unfamiliar with the Pacific War who desire a concise strategic summary".
