= Ian W. Toll =

American author and military historian (born 1967)

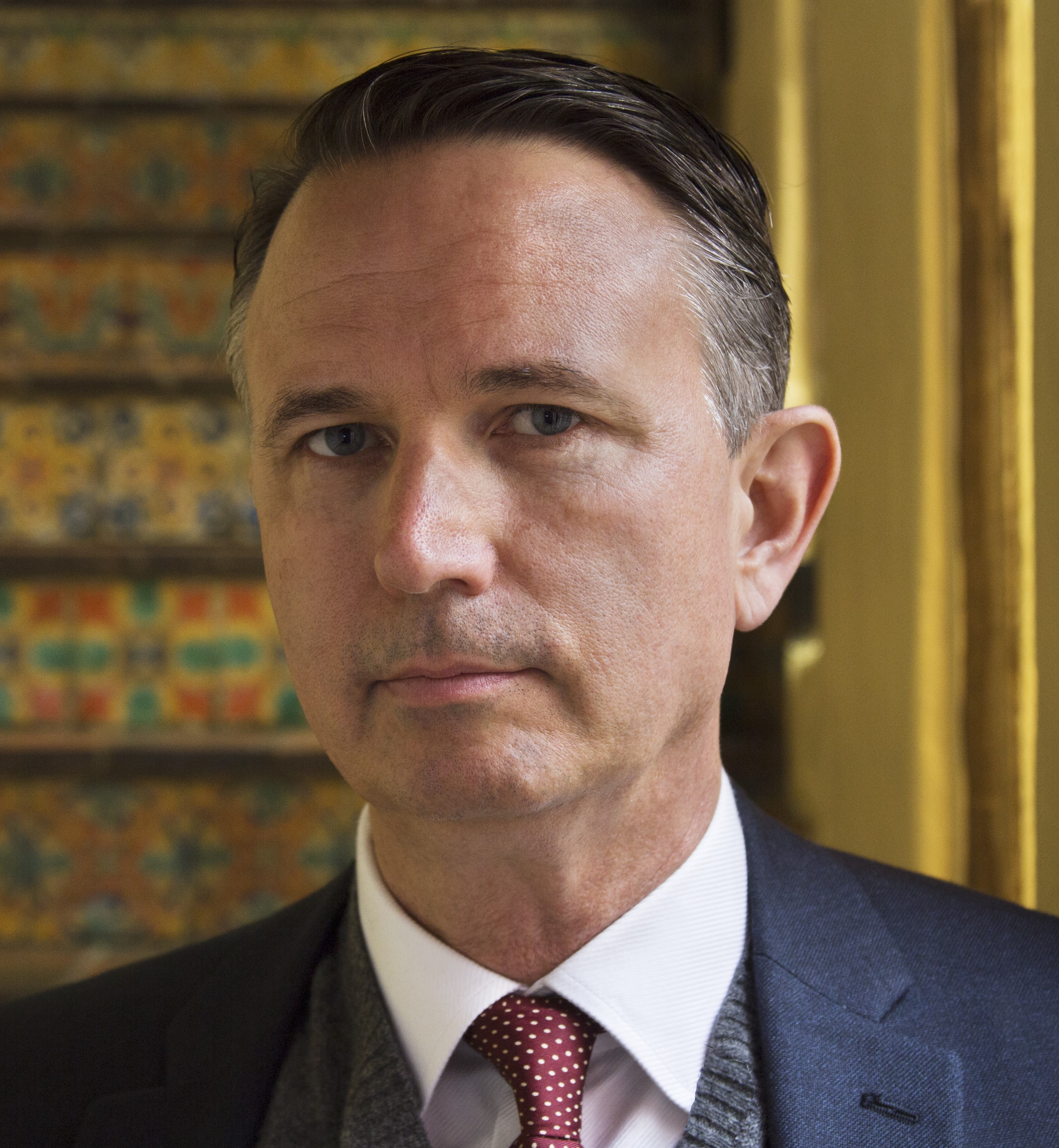
- Born: 1967 (age 58–59)
- Education: Georgetown University (BA); Harvard University (MPP)
- Occupations: Author; historian
- Writing career
- Notable works: Six Frigates (2006); The Pacific War Trilogy (2011–2020)

Ian W. Toll (born 1967) is an American author and military historian who lives in New York City. He wrote The Pacific War Trilogy, a three-volume history of the Pacific War.

== Education ==
Toll graduated from St George's School in Middletown, Rhode Island. He then studied and received a degree in history from Georgetown University in 1989. Toll studied and received a master's degree in public policy from the Kennedy School of Government at Harvard University in 1995.

== Career ==
Early in his career, Toll was a political aide and speechwriter to U.S. Senator Paul Sarbanes and New York Lieutenant Governor Stan Lundine. Subsequently, he was an analyst at the Federal Reserve Bank of New York and an equity research analyst at three investment banks.

Toll is the author of Six Frigates: The Epic History of the Founding of the U.S. Navy. He authored The Pacific War Trilogy, a three-volume history of the war in the Pacific. The volumes include: Pacific Crucible: War at Sea in the Pacific, 1941–1942, which covers the first six months of the war beginning with the attack on Pearl Harbor and the war in the eastern Pacific with its climax at the Battle of Midway; The Conquering Tide: War in the Pacific Islands, 1942–1944, which covers the period from June 1942–June 1944, covering the war in the central and southern Pacific, beginning with the Solomon Islands campaign, the following campaigns in the Gilbert and Marshall Islands, and concluding with the Mariana and Palau Islands campaigns; the final volume, Twilight of the Gods: War in the Western Pacific, 1944–1945, covers the final months of the war from July 1944 to the surrender of Japan in September 1945, with the campaigns to retake the Philippines, the battle of Okinawa and the atomic bombings of Hiroshima and Nagasaki.

Toll has also served as a juror for the National Endowment for the Humanities, a cultural ambassador for the U.S. State Department, and a lecturer at the Naval War College.

== Awards ==
Six Frigates was the 2007 recipient of the Samuel Eliot Morison Award for Naval Literature and the William E. Colby Military Writers Award.

Pacific Crucible received the Northern California Book Award for Nonfiction in 2012. The Conquering Tide was a New York Times bestseller and was selected as the best book of 2016 by Lionel Barber, editor of the Financial Times. Twilight of the Gods was a New York Times bestseller in 2020.

In 2019, Toll was awarded the Samuel Eliot Morison Award by the USS Constitution Museum.

== Books ==
- Six Frigates: The Epic History of the Founding of the U.S. Navy, W. W. Norton, 2006. ISBN 0393058476
- Pacific Crucible: War at Sea in the Pacific, 1941–1942, W. W. Norton, 2011. ISBN 9780393068139
- The Conquering Tide: War in the Pacific Islands, 1942–1944, W. W. Norton, 2015. ISBN 9780393080643
- Twilight of the Gods: War in the Western Pacific, 1944–1945, W. W. Norton, 2020. ISBN 9780393080650
