= P. J. Ochlan =

American actor and voice actor

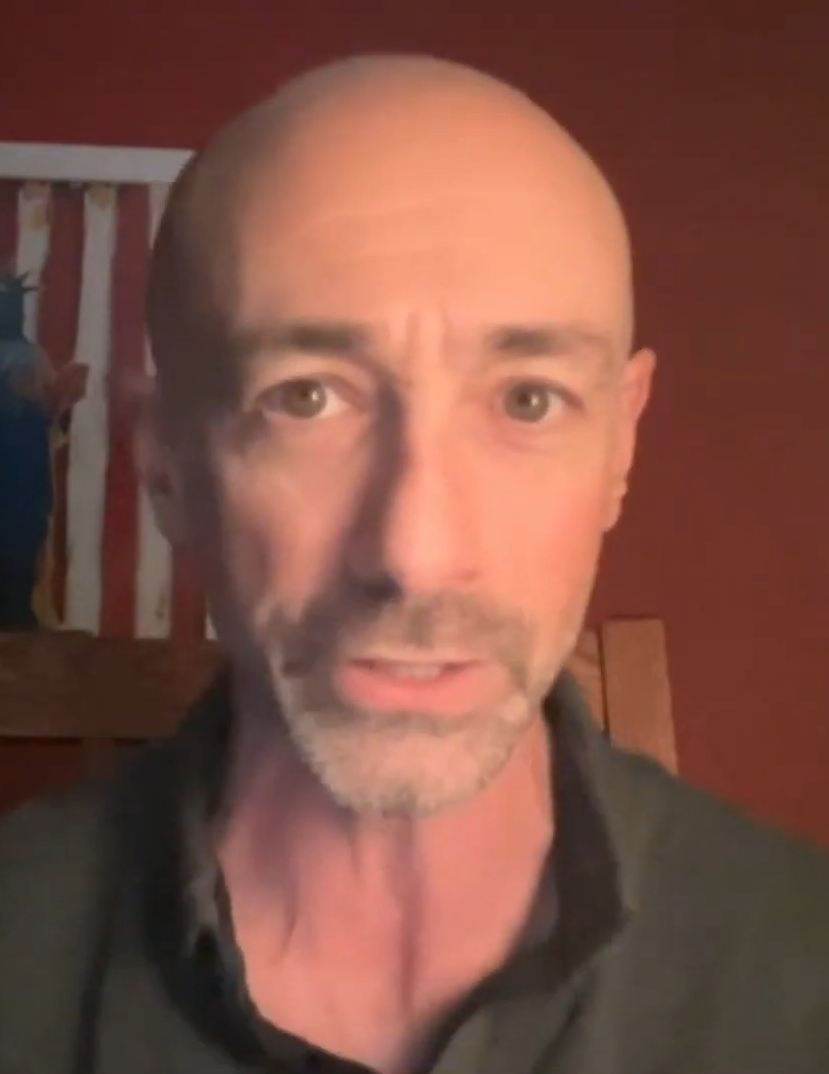
- Ochlan, 2023
- Born: Long Island, New York, U.S.
- Occupations: Actor; voice actor
- Years active: 1986–present

P. J. Ochlan is an American actor and voice actor best known for his roles as Damon Wells in the feature film Little Man Tate (1991) and Lester Shane in the television show Police Academy: The Series. He has narrated hundreds of audiobooks and has won the Audie Award and several AudioFile Earphones Awards. Ochlan appeared on Broadway in Abe Lincoln in Illinois and in the New York Shakespeare Festival production of Love's Labour's Lost for Joseph Papp.

== Life and career ==
=== Actor ===
P.J. Ochlan was born on February 16, 1975 and raised on Long Island in New York. His professional acting career began in 1986 with television commercials and voiceovers. He soon landed a recurring role in the CBS soap opera Guiding Light, and the lead role in the ABC pilot Wayside School directed by Thomas Schlamme. Other television roles which followed include Let's Get Mom for FOX directed by Garry Marshall and starring Carol Kane, the acclaimed ABC Afterschool Special Seasonal Differences with Uta Hagen, the ABC pilot The Flockens, and The Baby-Sitters Club (TV series) and Brotherly Love for HBO. Additional recurring roles include The Carsey-Werner Company primetime series Grand and the soap Another World, both for NBC. He later appeared in Space: Above and Beyond, and the pilots Hitched and Beyond, all for FOX. Ochlan has guest-starred in episodes of The Practice, The District (opposite Craig T. Nelson), See Dad Run (opposite Scott Baio), Castle, and The Crazy Ones (opposite Robin Williams).

Ochlan's first feature film was Little Vegas with Catherine O'Hara and Jerry Stiller. In 1991 he appeared in the widely acclaimed role of Damon Wells, "The Mathemagician," in Jodie Foster's directorial debut Little Man Tate. In 2000 he appeared in Cyberon, a direct-to-video spin-off from Doctor Who. Ochlan's other films have included Dead Man on Campus (with Mark-Paul Gosselaar), Quigley (film) (with Gary Busey), Wilde Salome (opposite Al Pacino), and Jersey Boys (directed by Clint Eastwood).

On stage, Ochlan played Moth in the New York Shakespeare Festival production of Love's Labour's Lost for Joseph Papp at the Public Theater. He made his Broadway debut in the 1993 Lincoln Center Theater revival of Robert E. Sherwood's Abe Lincoln in Illinois. The production, which starred Sam Waterston and was directed by Gerald Gutierrez, was nominated for three Tony Awards. Ochlan's stage performances in Los Angeles have included productions with A Noise Within and the Theater at Boston Court.

As a voice actor, Ochlan is best known as a prolific audiobook narrator with hundreds of titles to his credit. His work has been recognized with an Audie Award win and several nominations, several AudioFile Earphones Awards, and a Voice Arts Award nomination.

=== Teacher ===
Concurrent with his acting career, Ochlan works as a dialect and performance coach for film, television, stage and voiceover. In 2012 he founded Dr. Dialect. In 2013 he co-founded the Deyan Institute for Voice Artistry and Technology, where he conducts voiceover and audiobook narration classes. He has been an instructor/presenter at various universities and conferences including UCLA, the Audio Publishers Association Conference, That's Voiceover, and the National Audio Theatre Festival.
