= The Second World War (book) =

2012 book by Antony Beevor

- Author: Antony Beevor
- Language: English
- Subject: World War II
- Publisher: Weidenfeld & Nicolson
- Publication date: 2012
- Publication place: United Kingdom
- Media type: Print (Hardcover and Paperback)
- Pages: 863
- ISBN: 978-0-316-02374-0

The Second World War is a 2012 narrative history of World War II by the British historian Antony Beevor. The book starts with the Japanese invasion of Manchuria in 1931, and covers the entire Second World War. It ends with the final surrender of Axis forces.

== Synopsis ==
In the introduction, Beevor discusses Yang Kyoungjong, a Korean soldier forcibly conscripted by the Kwantung Army, then in turn taken prisoner by the Red Army and the Wehrmacht, eventually being captured by American troops. He also discusses the background of the war, including the rise of Nazism in post-World War I Germany, and the formation of alliances with Italy and Japan.

Throughout the bulk of the book, Beevor jumps back and forth throughout the different theaters of war. He begins by detailing Germany's invasion of Poland, Germany's alliance with the Soviet Union, and the invasion of France. Interspersed are chapters focusing on the Second Sino-Japanese War along with others building up a description of global events.

The perspective then expands to include the Mediterranean and Middle East theatre, the Battle of the Atlantic, the Battle of Britain, and the Balkans Campaign.

Following which, there is a major shift in focus onto the Eastern Front, detailing Operation Barbarossa, the Battle of Moscow, Operation Blau, and the epic Battle of Stalingrad, a conflict which Beevor had previously written about. Simultaneously, he also depicts the events of Pearl Harbor, the ensuing events in Asia, the Pacific, North Africa, as well the Holocaust.

As the Allies began to turn the war decisively in their favour. Alternating between the major events, Beevor details Operation Torch, American victories in the Pacific, and the Soviet counterattacks on the Eastern Front, the invasion of Sicily and Italy. In what Beevor terms the "Spring of Expectations", the Allies launch major offensives against Axis forces on all fronts: The Soviets push westwards successfully, while the Western Allies launch Operation Overlord, and numerous defeats are inflicted upon the Japanese.

As the war enters its final days, Beevor recounts the frantic race to Berlin between the Western Allies and the Soviets along with the downfall of the Nazi regime. After the fall of Berlin, another topic Beevor has previously written about, Beevor turns to the dropping of the atomic bombs and the surrender of Japan. He concludes with a recount of the devastation caused by the war.

Multiple important figures in the war are covered in detail, not only including the important national leaders (Roosevelt, Churchill, Stalin, Hitler, Mussolini, Hideki Tojo, Chiang Kai-shek), but also individual generals (von Manstein, Rommel, Yamamoto, Zhukov, Montgomery, Eisenhower, MacArthur, and others) and lesser-known political figures.

Beevor devotes entire chapters to particularly important battles or operations, including Operation Barbarossa, the Battle of Moscow, Pearl Harbor, Operation Blau, the Battle of Stalingrad, the Battle of Kursk, and the Battle of Berlin.

== Reviews ==
As one of Beevor's culminating works, The Second World War received mostly positive reviews. The Guardian praised his account of the Eastern Front, but criticised his depiction of the Second Sino-Japanese War and its rapid pace. Other reviews lauded the global scale of the book and its gripping narrative, and the attention it gives to lesser-known areas of the war.

== Opinions ==
=== Left-right conflict ===
Beevor's central theme in The Second World War is the ongoing conflict between the left and the right. Nazi Germany and its allies represent the far right, while the Soviet Union and Communist China represent the far left. Beevor does not take a side in this conflict; he views both sides as having committed serious war crimes against their opponents. In some ways, the war transcended political and ideological boundaries, such as the Soviets' early alliance with Nazi Germany; although in other ways, ideological differences became a major motivation for the war.

=== Communist China ===
Beevor takes a highly critical view of Communist China and Mao Zedong. He believes that Nationalist China, under Chiang Kai-shek, undertook most of the effort in fighting the Japanese despite being seriously undersupplied, while the Communists participated little in the fighting. Instead, their real goal was to save up their strength for the coming civil war against the Nationalists. In fact, Beevor goes so far as to say that the Communists actually signed secret agreements with the Japanese to ignore each other.

=== Views of individual generals ===
Beevor also disagrees with some long-held views about certain generals in the war; in particular, he writes that the reputations of Bernard Montgomery and Erwin Rommel are far overblown.

== See also ==
- Allies at War by Tim Bouverie (2025)
- All Hell Let Loose: The World at War, 1939-1945 by Max Hastings (2011).
- The Storm of War by Andrew Roberts (2009).
