= All Hell Let Loose =

2011 book by Max Hastings

All Hell Let Loose: The World at War 1939-1945
- 2011 Cover
- Author: Max Hastings
- Subject: World War II
- Genre: History
- Publisher: HarperCollins UK
- Publication date: 29 Sep 2011
- Pages: 748
- ISBN: 0-00-733812-0
- OCLC: 756529972

All Hell Let Loose: The World at War 1939-1945 is a 2011 book by historian Max Hastings, covering the history of World War II and complementing Hastings' earlier works Overlord, Armageddon and Nemesis. In the United States, it was published under the title Inferno: The World at War, 1939-1945.

== Synopsis ==
All Hell Let Loose covers the entire span of World War II, following the military developments of the war but focusing on the reactions and experiences of different individuals (both uniformed and civilian). Reviews refer to the book as an "everyman's story" made up of accounts from those with lesser roles in the conflict; "ranging from ship's cooks to wireless operators, farmers and housewives to typists and black marketeers."

The book addresses several "triumphalist" aspects of written war history by focusing on the "misery, heroism and endurance" of individual accounts. Hastings concludes that whilst the Nazis fought individual battles well, their overall war effort showed "stunning incompetence".

== Critical reception ==
Martin Rubin, writing in the San Francisco Chronicle, gave a positive review, calling All Hell Let Loose "a true distillation of everything this historian has learned from a lifetime of scholarship". In a review in The Observer, Ian Thomson noted the book's British-centric Western Front narrative, although not ignoring other aspects of the war, and called it "immensely long, but extremely readable". Thomson also says that Hastings has "a faint antipathy towards foreigners". Jonathan Sumption criticised the book's "relentlessly pessimistic message" and says that the everyman perspective gives a distorted view of the war.

All Hell Let Loose was named as one of The Telegraph's Books of the Year 2011, in the category of History Books.

== See also ==
- Allies at War by Tim Bouverie (2025)
- The Second World War by Antony Beevor (2012).
- The Storm of War by Andrew Roberts (2009).
