= The Storm of War =

2009 book by Andrew Roberts

- First edition hardcover image
- Author: Andrew Roberts
- Language: English
- Subject: World War II
- Publisher: Allen Lane
- Publication date: 2009
- Publication place: United Kingdom
- Pages: 711
- ISBN: 9780713999709

The Storm of War is a non-fiction book authored by British historian and journalist Andrew Roberts. It covers numerous historical factors of the Second World War such as Adolf Hitler's rise to power and the organisation of Nazi Germany as well as numerous missteps made by the dictatorial regime. The inherent failures of the Axis powers helped in the massive efforts to force their defeat, which constitutes in Roberts' opinion, despite the massive bloodshed during the war, a moral triumph over authoritarianism by idealistic democracy. Praise has come from several publications; examples include The Daily Beast, The Economist, and The Observer.

It additionally received the British Army Military Book of the Year Award for 2010. The book has also achieved commercial success, reaching the #2 slot on The Sunday Times best-seller list. In terms of legacy, Roberts is perhaps best known internationally for The Storm of War, though his later biographical works focusing on Napoleon Bonaparte and Winston Churchill have also attracted significant attention.

== Background and contents ==
In summary, Roberts states that the same inherent reason that drove the Nazi Party to orchestrate World War II also sowed within its administrative structure and inherent war aims the seeds of its own destruction. The government became utterly captive to its own ideology and thus failed miserably to achieve successes that had hypothetically been within its grasp. The dictatorial rulers Adolf Hitler and Joseph Stalin both shared a psychological core of ruthless brutality and took terrible actions due to their repressive views, throwing thousands and thousands of lives away in the process, yet the eventual defeat of the Axis powers constitutes through Roberts' eyes a moral triumph of principled democratic pluralism over cruel authoritarianism that led the way to a better future.

The author's specific analysis of the war's inception convinces him that the Nazis possessed significant advantages in military organisation and economic power early on. Roberts writes that, if someone other than Hitler had control of German military strategy, the country would likely have forgone a costly direct invasion of Soviet territories (which occurred through Operation Barbarossa) and instead would have swept through Mediterranean territories before trying to seal off British-controlled Middle East areas. Thus, Roberts asserts, the likely morale-building victories against the comparatively weak forces to the southeast could have allowed Hitler to essentially win the war.

Roberts additionally writes that he views Stalin's control of the Soviet forces as having been disastrous to the allied efforts against the Axis powers. He notes that Stalin's obsessive tactics of killing his own men for ideological reasons cost him thousands upon thousands of troops. In the Battle of Stalingrad alone, Soviet forces killed the equivalent of two full divisions of their own personnel.

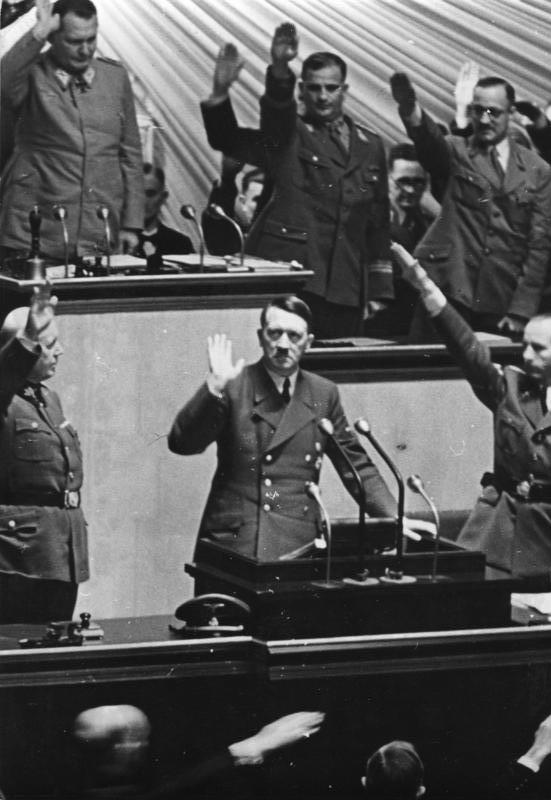
German dictator Adolf Hitler is pictured while officially declaring war upon the United States on 11 December 1941. Roberts views this action as fundamentally disastrous for the Third Reich.

Nonetheless, the truly fateful blunders that permanently determined the fate of the war came out of Berlin. Hitler's other key strategic mistake, according to Roberts, was the German declaration of war against the United States, which happened only four days after the Pearl Harbor attacks and which the Nazi regime was not obliged to do. Roberts argues that after the declaration, Germany could not keep the U.S. war-making economic machine at bay. In short, Roberts declares that the mistakes, delusions and exaggerated self-confidence complexes that fascist dictatorship inherently fostered proved its undoing.

Writing for The Observer, journalist Robert Service observes,

The central character in the book's drama, inevitably, is Hitler. Roberts's suggestion seems to be that he could only have won the war if he had not allowed it to spiral into a global struggle. Hitler missed his chance to knock out the USSR early on and provoked the US into entering the ring on the side of the opposition. He may have won the war if he had kept it as 'the First European War'; the gamble that did not pay off was to make it global.

== Reception and commercial response ==
The book has picked up praise from several publications. Alongside support from The Economist, positive reviews came from The Daily Beast, where historian Michael Korda lauded it as written "superbly well" and stated that Roberts' "scholarship is superb", and The Wall Street Journal, where historian Jonathan W. Jordan argued that Roberts "splendidly weaves a human tragedy into a story". The work received the British Army Military Book of the Year Award for 2010 as well.

The Observer ran a supportive review by journalist Robert Service, who labeled the work as "a sparkling addition" to the often more geographically limited literature on the war. Many other points of analysis in previous books, in Service's opinion, hadn't properly conveyed the larger picture of various aspects of the conflict. Service wrote that "Roberts offers refreshing judgments on the politicians and commanders in lively prose" and that additionally the author's "denunciation of the murder of millions of Jews is as measured as it is moving."

In terms of the commercial response, it reached the #2 slot on The Sunday Times best-seller list. Roberts' legacy as a writer has been such that he has been perhaps best known internationally for The Storm of War. However, his later biographical works focusing on Napoleon Bonaparte and Winston Churchill have also attracted significant attention.

== See also ==
- Andrew Roberts bibliography
- Allies at War by Tim Bouverie (2025)
- The Second World War by Antony Beevor (2012).
- All Hell Let Loose: The World at War, 1939-1945 by Max Hastings (2011).
