= Indianapolis 500 in film and media =

Media treatment of American auto race

The Indianapolis 500 auto race has been the subject for several motion pictures. It has also received countless references in television, film, commercials, books, and other media. The following is a list of such references.

== Highlight films ==
Official highlight films for the Indianapolis 500 date back to about 1949. However, newsreel films and highlight films for races prior to WWII also exist, including footage of the inaugural 500 in 1911. Currently, the Indianapolis Motor Speedway produces an official release. Previously, it was not uncommon for multiple films to be produced annually. Among the companies that sponsored films were Firestone, STP, Bowes Seal Fast, Ford, Chrysler, and Ashland Oil.

Narration for the films was performed by several individuals, including Sid Collins, Bud Lindemann, Ralph Camargo, Stan Richards, Marvin Miller, Charlie Brockman, Tom Carnegie, Paul Page, and Bob Jenkins. In some of the films, IMS Radio Network audio is used, featuring Jenkins, Mike King, and others.

=== The Legends of the Brickyard ===
In 1987, ESPN re-packaged the Indianapolis 500 highlight films into a television series. The episodes from 1975 to 1986 were included in a series titled The Legends of the Brickyard, which was hosted by Bob Jenkins and Larry Nuber. The duo would appear at the beginning and end of each episode, and at commercial bumpers to add brief commentary about the race. All of the segments were recorded at the Speedway, and most were done in the pit area during practice for the 1987 Indy 500. Additional episodes were added in subsequent years for the races of 1987–1996. Jenkins and Nuber hosted the episode for the 1987 race, but for 1988–1993, only Jenkins appeared since Nuber was no longer with the network. The episodes for 1994–1996 featured no host. Some of the episodes were slightly edited for content and time, and were made to fit a 30-minute broadcast window. The final original episode that aired highlighted the 1996 race, and the series was rerun on ESPN, ESPN2, and ESPN Classic through 2000.

=== Indy 500: A Race for Heroes ===
Starting in 1989, ESPN started producing a second Indy 500-related program, Indy 500: A Race for Heroes. Similar to The Legends of the Brickyard, but each episode focuses on one particular driver, and their career at Indianapolis. It aired in reruns through about 2000. The drivers featured were Sam Hanks, Jimmy Bryan, Mauri Rose, Wilbur Shaw, Tony Bettenhausen, Dan Gurney, Bill Vukovich, Roger Penske, Mark Donohue, Tom Sneva, Bobby Rahal, Danny Sullivan, Troy Ruttman, Jim Rathmann, Louis Meyer, Johnny Rutherford, A. J. Foyt, Rick Mears, Al Unser Sr., Al Unser Jr., Bobby Unser, Gordon Johncock, Arie Luyendyk, Emerson Fittipaldi, Rodger Ward, and British Invasion. Several episodes were made available on Joost.com, and the Foyt episode was included on a 2007 DVD release.

=== Indy 500: The Classics ===
Speedvision re-packaged the Indianapolis 500 highlight films from 1960 to 1989, with the exception of 1967, and aired them in a 30-minute format. The show was hosted by Mike King and Donald Davidson. When Speedvision reorganized into SPEED, the program was no longer aired.

=== SportsCentury ===
The ESPN documentary series SportsCentury has featured several Indy 500 drivers. The original top 100 voting included A. J. Foyt (#80) and Mario Andretti (#92), but episodes were not initially created for those two drivers.

After the original run, the series was expanded, and eventually included episodes for the following Indy 500 drivers: A. J. Foyt, Mario Andretti, Al Unser Sr., Bill Vukovich, and Rick Mears. Brickyard 400 winners Jeff Gordon, Dale Earnhardt, and Tony Stewart have also been featured.

== Film ==
- Racing Hearts (1922) - silent film featuring actual drivers Edward Heffman, Jerry Wunderlich, Jimmy Murphy, Tommy Milton, and Ralph DePalma.
- Speedway (1929) - starring William Haines and Anita Page. Bill Whipple (Haines) is a cocky racer and mechanic, on the track, and chases Patricia (Page) around longing to impress her.
- The Crowd Roars (1932) - starring James Cagney and Joan Blondell
- Speed (1936) - starring Jimmy Stewart
- Indianapolis Speedway (1939) - Also known as: Devil on Wheels, remake of The Crowd Roars
- Sport Chumpions (1941) - final scene is set at the "Indianapolis Speed Classic". The race's name is a reference to the Indianapolis 500.
- The Big Wheel (1949) - starring Mickey Rooney and Thomas Mitchell. Racer Billy Coy (Rooney) is the son of a great auto racer who was killed at the Indianapolis 500. He is branded a daredevil after causing the death of another driver, and strains to rebuild his career and personal life.
- To Please a Lady (1950) - starring Clark Gable and Barbara Stanwyck. Columnist Regina Forbes (Stanwyck) writes an article about driver Mike Brannan (Gable) claiming he is reckless and blames him for the death of another driver. Brannan then tries to clean up his act, and at the same time, win Regina's love.
- Roar of the Crowd (1953) - starring Howard Duff and Helene Stanley. Racer Johnny Tracy (Duff) wants to race at the Indianapolis 500, but his girlfriend wants him to retire. He agrees to retire after the race, but gets injured in a crash. He then works to get back to the track, and get her to change her mind about his retirement.
- Winning (1969) - starring Paul Newman, Joanne Woodward, and Robert Wagner. Frank Capua (Newman) is a rising star on the race circuit who dreams of winning the big one - the Indianapolis 500. But to get there he runs the risk of losing his wife Elora (Woodward) to his rival, Luther Erding (Wagner), and strains the relationship with his stepson Charley (Richard Thomas).
- Turbo (2013) - computer-animated film starring Ryan Reynolds as Turbo, a garden snail who dreams of being the greatest racer in the world and winning the Indianapolis 500, racing against Guy Gagne (Bill Hader), the French Canadian Adrenalode race car driver, but his brother, Chet (Paul Giamatti), tries to hinder Turbo's dream.

== Film references ==
- Gangway for Tomorrow (1943) features a flashback sequence with character Joe Dunham (Robert Ryan) reminiscing about almost winning the "500". He suffered a blown right front tire in the closing laps. The film shows some historical footage of the race.
- The Blob (1958) - The scene where the Blob absorbs two mechanics working in a garage, an Indianapolis 500 poster on the wall. It is visible while one of the mechanics takes a phone call.
- Godzilla vs Megalon (1973) - A photo of Al Unser's 1970 Johny Lightning Indy 500 winning car can be seen in Dr. Ibuki's lab, as well as Indianapolis Motor Speedway stickers on his car on each of the side windows.
- Grease (1978) - During the "Greased Lightnin'" scene in the garage, an accurate, authentic period Firestone Indianapolis 500 advertisement poster is located on the wall in the background.
- Apocalypse Now (1979) - Captain Willard states that "Charging a man with murder in this place (Vietnam) was like handing out speeding tickets at the Indy 500."
- A Christmas Story (1983) - During the flat tire scene, the narrator, Jean Shepherd, explains that the Old Man always dreamed of being "in the pits at the Indianapolis Speedway in the 500".
- Platoon (1986) - Bunny states that "Ain't nothing like a piece of p***y, except maybe the Indy 500."
- The Brave Little Toaster (1987) - During the junkyard scene, one of the cars sent to the crushing machine claims he "once ran the Indy 500".
- Days of Thunder (1990) - When asked what his goal was in open-wheel auto racing, Cole Trickle said, "Indianapolis, but you can't win in Indy without a great car and my name's not Andretti or Unser."
- Bill & Ted's Bogus Journey (1991) - Closing credits show a Motor Trend magazine reporting "Reaper wins Indy 500".
- JFK (1991) - Susie Cox states that she had spoken to a car salesman who had accompanied Lee Harvey Oswald on a test drive who said that Oswald "took the curves like A.J. Foyt at the Indy 500".
- Herbie: Fully Loaded (2005) - The junkyard owner sarcastically say that Herbie the Love Bug winning the Ugly-annapolis 500, making a pun of the "500".
- Speed Racer (2008) indirectly references the Indy 500 with the winner of the Grand Prix drinking from a bottle of milk.

== Television ==
- On the May 18, 1991, episode of Saturday Night Live, a sketch featured Bill Swerski's Superfans discussing the prospects of the Chicago Bears entering the Indianapolis 500 with Mike Ditka driving the team bus. On the December 12, 1998, episode, a "Bill Brasky" sketch starring Alec Baldwin, John Goodman, and Will Ferrell included dialog by Goodman's character (Ted): "Did I ever tell you about the time he taught his son how to drive? He did it by entering him in the Indy 500. The kid wrecked and died. Brasky said it would've happened sometime". They also did a 'pick the winner' in an imaginary scenario between Rick Mears, and the Chicago Bears in the aforementioned school bus. All but Pat (Mike Myers) picked the Bears. (Rick Mears won the 500 the following weekend.)
- The sitcom Home Improvement had many references to the Indy 500 during its eight-season run. During DVD Audio commentary for the pilot episode, co-creator David MacFadzean revealed that the Indy 500 and racing was a key theme to the show. His father-in-law worked for Thomas W. Binford, who at the time was the chief steward for the 500. MacFadzean thought that the name "Binford" was a perfect fit for a tool company, and decided to use it for the fictional Binford Tools.
  - During the episode "Talk to Me" (March 14, 1995), Tim Taylor gives bad advice to two audience members during a segment on "Tool Time". Later in the episode, the men return and one of men named "Jim" announces he has finally picked a date for his wedding – May 28. A stunned Tim quickly whispers in his ear "that's the Indy 500 weekend". Jim quickly corrected himself, and changed it to June 4.
  - In many other episodes, Tim's garage features an authentic "Gasoline Alley" street sign, an official Indianapolis Motor Speedway souvenir.
  - Indy drivers including Mario and Michael Andretti, Johnny Rutherford, Al Unser Sr., Al Unser Jr., and Robby Gordon, along with broadcaster Jack Arute, have all guest-starred on the program at one time.
- On the Season 4/episode 15 of The Rocky and Bullwinkle Show, Mr. Peabody takes Sherman in the WABAC machine to "meet the man who won the first Indianapolis auto race", Barnaby Victor. (In actuality, it was Ray Haroun.)
- In the Frasier episode " "Fortysomething", Bulldog asks a woman named Carrie "Didn't I let you pour a flaming tequila shooter down my throat at Sloppy Nick's during ah, last year's Indy 500?"
- On the December 10, 1964, episode of The Flintstones, Fred and Barney enter the "Indianrockolis 500" with Fred driving under the name "Goggles Pisanno".
- The Indy 500 was referred to at least twice in the television series M*A*S*H. In one instance, Corporal Klinger is driving Major Winchester to the Kimpo Airfield. Winchester demanded to know if the Jeep they were riding in could go any faster. Klinger replied, "There's a reason you don't see these things racing at Indianapolis." In another episode, an ambulance overturns when it is leaving the compound too quickly. When Radar informs Col. Potter about the incident, Potter exclaims, "When are these boys gonna realize this isn't the Indianapolis 500!"
- In an episode of The Brady Bunch ("The Wheeler-Dealer," October 8, 1971) in which Greg gets a car, he says it's "...the hottest set of wheels this side of Indianapolis!"
- In an episode of Get a Life ("The Prettiest Week of My Life", September 30, 1990). Chris said "I was a winner. I felt like Secretariat the night he won the Indy 500."
- In an episode of Sabrina the Teenage Witch, ("Third Aunt From the Sun", November 8, 1996). Aunt Zelda and Aunt Hilda are tricked by their older sister Vesta. Hilda is sent to play in a string trio at Daytona. She then says, "Vesta's trick backfired. Our trio just got booked at the Indy 500."
- Three 1999 episodes of COPS were filmed in the city of Indianapolis during race weekend of 1999. Footage of the 500 Festival Parade was shown, as well as police action outside the track the days leading up to the race.
- On the March 27, 2001, episode of That '70s Show ("Eric's Naughty No-no"), Eric's aunt Paula tells about how she was "waving the starting flag at the Indy 500".
- In a season 1 episode of Family Guy, titled "The Son Also Draws" (May 9, 1999), there is a scene in which Chris plays a game in the casino named the "Virtual Indy 500".
- On the November 19, 1999, episode of Who Wants to Be a Millionaire, the fastest finger question was "Put the following races in order according to their length, from the shortest to the longest." The Indianapolis 500 was one of the four answers. The correct player with the fastest time was John Carpenter, who would go on to become the first player on the U.S. version of the show to win the $1 million prize.
- At least 23 episodes of Jeopardy! have featured Indy 500-related clues, including two episodes which featured an entire category related to Indy, and one episode that featured an Indy-related Final Jeopardy clue.
- On the November 12, 2006, episode of Extreme Makeover: Home Edition, host Ty Pennington was shown on the main straight of the Indianapolis Motor Speedway during the opening sitting in an Indycar.
- The pilot episode of Show Me the Money which aired November 14, 2006, featured the question: "Who finished 4th in the Indianapolis 500 in 2005, her rookie year in the Indy Racing League." The correct answer was Danica Patrick, and the contestant responded correctly.
- In 2006, the Food Network hosted a Food Network Challenge cake decorating contest at the track. It was held in the infield on the morning of the race. The winner was invited to compete in a later episode.
- 2001 and 2002, Indy 500 winner Hélio Castroneves was a contestant on and won Season 5 of Dancing with the Stars. That ensuing May, his professional partner, Julianne Hough, sang the National Anthem and Season 6 champion Kristi Yamaguchi was the starter of the 2008 race.
- In the Jem episode "Intrigue at the Indy 500", rock star Jem races in and wins the Indy 500.
- In the Beavis and Butt-Head episode "Bus Trip", the school bus driver becomes angry when he is cut off by a reckless driver and yells, "This isn't the Indy, you moron!"
- Reality shows that include scenes filmed or featuring the race include: Man v. Food ("Indianapolis, Indiana"), American Chopper ("Window World Bike"), and Keeping Up with the Kardashians.
- Indy Racing League and Indianapolis 500 decals and souvenirs, and related content, have appeared in the background on television series including According to Jim, Family Foreman, Everybody Loves Raymond, Gene Simmons Family Jewels, Grounded for Life, The King of Queens, Malcolm in the Middle, The Middle, Roswell, and The Upshaws (the latter set in Indianapolis).
- During the 2010 season, the opening credits for NBC Sunday Night Football featured an image of Indy cars racing down the main stretch at Indianapolis.
- On the January 10, 2011, episode of Million Dollar Money Drop, the couple's first question was "Traditionally, winners of the Indianapolis 500 drink what kind of beverage in victory lane?" The choices were: A) "One made by Anheuser-Busch", B) "One made by Dom Pérignon", C) "One made by an Atlanta soft drink company", and D) "One made by cows". The couple put all $1 million on "B," and lost all their money on the first question.
- In February 2012, the Indianapolis Motor Speedway served as a backdrop for segments of The Ellen DeGeneres Show and Late Night with Jimmy Fallon in the days preceding Super Bowl XLVI hosted in the city.
- The Indianapolis Motor Speedway was featured in the episodes "Indiana" (2015) and "Man Made Marvels" (2016) on the Smithsonian Channel television series Aerial America.

== Music ==
- The Beach Boys song "Fun, Fun, Fun" includes the line "She makes the Indy 500 look like a Roman chariot race now."
- In the tongue-in-cheek song "Flushed From The Bathroom Of Your Heart" from the 1968 album At Folsom Prison, Johnny Cash sings "At the Indianapolis of your heart, I lost the race."
- Rap duo Binary Star released a song titled "Indy 500" on their 2006 album Masters of the Universe.
- "Indie 500" is a song by The Wrens on the 1996 album Secaucus.
- An Indianapolis Motor Speedway sticker can be seen on a case in the video for Grateful Dead's "Touch of Grey." The video itself was filmed during a concert that was held at Laguna Seca Raceway, a former Champ Car and current IndyCar track.
- The music video for the song "Real American" by Rick Derringer features a shot of Hulk Hogan superimposed over a photo of the start of the 1984 Indianapolis 500.
- The Puerto Rican band Menudo made a song titled Indianapolis, promoting the Indianapolis 500.
- The A cappella band Rockapella performed a song titled Indiana on the 1992 album Where in the World Is Carmen Sandiego? which includes references to the Indy 500 - specifically a spoken word interlude performed by Greg Lee imitating the IMS public address announcer before and during the race, as well as the lyric "Down at the Brickyard on Memorial Day."
- Mark Knopfler wrote a song about a season of racing titled "Speedway At Nazareth" that includes a verse about going onto Indianapolis, Indiana, in May. "Well the Brickyard's there to crucify anyone who will not learn/I climbed a mountain to qualify/I went flat through the turns/But I was down in the might-have-beens and an old pal good as died/And I sat down in Gasoline Alley and I cried." The song appears on Knopfler's second solo album, Sailing to Philadelphia, released in September 2000.
- The song "The Plan" by G-Eazy includes the line "Indy 500 my pace"

== Gaming ==
- Indy 500 - a 1977 Atari game.
- Indianapolis 500: The Simulation - a 1989 PC game by Papyrus and EA.
- Indianapolis 500 Expansion Pack - a 1993 add-on for the 1993 game IndyCar Racing by Papyrus.
- Indy 500 - a 1995 Sega arcade game.
- Indianapolis 500 - a 1995 Bally pinball machine
- Indianapolis 500 Legends - a 2007 Wii and DS game, and Indianapolis 500 Evolution - a 2009 Xbox 360 game were both published by Destineer. Both games track the history of the race from 1961 to 1971.
- An Indianapolis Motor Speedway logo checkered flag appears on the wall of the "Phi Psi Kappa" gig in Guitar Hero World Tour.
- The track has been featured as a playable track in all entries of the Forza Motorsport racing franchise since Forza Motorsport 4, having been featured on the cover of the aforementioned title.

== Other ==
- The 2005 Indianapolis Colts were nicknamed on CBS as the "Indy 500 Offense".
- A short story by Jean Shepherd, also recited on WOR May 26, 1967, was entitled "Indy 500".
- On May 28, 1993, Paul Harvey's The Rest of the Story focused on the first Indianapolis 500 in 1911. The "twist" at the end revealed winner Ray Harroun made the first known use of a rear-view mirror.
- Floyd Clymer published yearbooks reviewing the Indianapolis 500 from 1946 to 1968.
- The callsign of Republic Airways, based in Indianapolis, is "Brickyard", named after the track.

== Program cover art ==
Since the inception of the race in 1911, a collectible Official Program has been sold by the track each year at the race. The cover art for the program is typically created by a notable painter, illustrator, or photographer. With the exception of a period from roughly 1954 to 1976, each annual program has featured a unique cover, many commissioned by a renowned artist.

Recent program covers/artists:

- 1981: Photo of Borg-Warner Trophy
- 1982: Photo of items from IMS Museum
- 1983: David Grove
- 1984: Roger B. White (Bas-relief sculpture)
- 1985: Ron Burton
- 1986: Bernie Fuchs (fold out)
- 1987: Todd Reifers
- 1988: Bob Peak
- 1989: James Dietz
- 1990: Stuart L. Grant (glass etching)
- 1991: Bernie Fuchs (four paintings; fold out)
- 1992: Six painting collage
  - James Dietz
  - Ken Dallison
  - Bart Forbes
  - David Taylor
  - Victor Stabin
  - Philip Castle
- 1993: Mark English
- 1994: Ken Dallison
- 1995: David Grove (fold out)
- 1996: James Dietz (fold out)
- 1997: Philip Castle
- 1998: Dennis Simon
- 1999: Bart Forbes
- 2000: David Grove
- 2001: Hologram photos
- 2002: George Tiedemann (photographs of Borg-Warner Trophy)
- 2003: Peter Max
- 2004: Charles Fazzino
- 2005: LeRoy Neiman
- 2006: Gregory Beall and Brad Walters (fold out)
- 2007: Nicholas Watts
- 2008: David Uhl
- 2009: Thomas Kincade (fold out)
- 2010: Walter Knabe
- 2011: Three covers (100th anniversary)
  - David Uhl
  - Gregory Beall
  - Thomas Kincade
- 2012: Brad Walters
- 2013: Shawn Gritzmacher and John Cote (Photograph of former Indy 500 winners)
- 2014: Paul Laguette
- 2015: Troy Lee
- 2016: 100th running logo
- 2017: Brett King
