= John H. Morrow Jr. =

American historian

John Howard Morrow Jr.
- Education: Swarthmore College (BA), University of Pennsylvania (PhD)
- Occupations: Historian and professor
- Years active: 1971-present

John Howard Morrow Jr. (born 1944), is an American historian. As of 2022, Morrow is an Emeritus Professor at University of Georgia. From 1988 to 2022, he was the Franklin Professor and taught undergraduate and graduate courses in the history of Modern Europe and of warfare and society at the University of Georgia. His expertise included Modern European history, war and diplomacy, World War I, and world history. Morrow is the author of several books. His most recent publication is Harlem's Rattlers and the Great War: The Undaunted 369th Regiment and the African American Quest for Equality, which he co-authored with Dr. Jeffrey T. Sammons.

== Education ==
Morrow earned his Bachelor of Arts degree in history from Swarthmore College. In 1971, he graduated from the University of Pennsylvania with his Ph.D. in Modern European History.

== Career ==
For seventeen years, starting in 1971, Morrow taught at the University of Tennessee (UTK) in the College of Arts and Sciences. He was the first African-American faculty member. From 1983 to 1988, he served as Head of the university's History Department. He was the first African-American to chair a department at UTK, and the university's first African-American Macebearer. The latter is the highest honor a faculty member can receive. Because of his successful career at UTK, a lecture series and military history award was named after him.

In 1988, Morrow joined the faculty at the University of Georgia as Franklin Professor. Three years later, he was elected History Department chairman. From 1993 to 1995, he served as the associate dean of the College of Arts and Sciences. In 2010, Morrow was again elected History Department chairman.

From 1988 to 1989, Morrow served as the Charles A Lindbergh Visiting Professor at the National Air and Space Museum.

For a single semester in 2005, Morrow was a visiting professor at the United States Military Academy in West Point. Here, he taught German history, and was awarded an Outstanding Civilian Service Medal by the United States Department of the Army.

He has been a lecturer at the National War College, Air War College, and US Military Academy. Morrow has also been on numerous committees. Morrow was a part of the History Advisory committee to the Secretary of the Air Force, Research Advisory Committee of the National Museum of American History, and Search Committee for the Director of the National Museum of American History. He has also served on the History Advisory Committee of the Department of the Army, Dwight D. Eisenhower Memorial Commission's Legacy Committee, and First Flight Centennial Federal Advisory Board.

Morrow is a member of Presidential Counselors of The National WWII Museum in New Orleans and on the advisory board of the Center for Oral History at the US Military Academy in West Point.

== Personal ==
He is the son of former American diplomat John H. Morrow and Ann Rowena Davis Morrow, and sister to Jean Rowena Morrow. He is the nephew of E. Frederic Morrow, the nations first African American to hold an executive position at the White House and Nellie Morrow Parker, the first African-American public school teacher in Bergen County, New Jersey.

== Honors ==
- 1985: University of Tennessee, Outstanding Teacher, National Alumni Association
- 1985: University of Tennessee, Macebearer
- 2005: US Department of the Army, Outstanding Civilian Service
- 2019: Pritzker Literature Award

== Publications ==
- Harlem's Rattlers and the Great War: The Undaunted 369th Regiment and the African American Quest for Equality (2014), co-author, ISBN 978-0700619573
- Oxford Illustrated History of the First World War (1998), contributor
- A Yankee Ace in the RAF. The World War I Letters of Captain Boart Rogers (1996), Editor, ISBN 978-0700607983
- The Great War in the Air (1993) ISBN 978-1560982388
- German Airpower in World War I (1982)
- Building German Airpower (1976) ISBN 978-0870491962
