= Citizen Soldier (TV program) =

- Genre: Military History, Military Affairs and Public Policy
- Created by: Kenneth Clarke
- Written by: Kenneth Clarke (2013-2015); Nancy Houghton (2012-2013); Luc Gourguechon (2020- ) Sarah Schwartz (2020-)
- Theme music composer: David Cannek
- Country of origin: United States
- Original language: English
- No. of seasons: 3
- No. of episodes: 30

Production
- Executive producers: Jennifer N. Pritzker; Kenneth Clarke (2013-2015); Rob Havers (2020- )
- Producers: Kenneth Clarke (2013-2015); Rob Havers (2020- ) David Cannek; Andrew Edeker; Bradley Guidera; Nancy Houghton (2012-2013); Nathan Barnes (2012-2013); Aaron Pylinski (2012-2013); Megan Williams (2020-)
- Production locations: Pritzker Military Museum and Library
- Running time: 26 minutes

Original release
- Network: WTTW
- Release: 2013 – 2020

Citizen Soldier is a television program produced by the Pritzker Military Museum & Library. It airs on PBS channel WTTW. Each 26 minute episode of Citizen Soldier explores topics on military history, affairs and policy through interviews and panel discussions with scholars, military personnel, and authors. From exploring the military necessity of the Emancipation Proclamation with James McPherson to an alternative history of the Battle of Midway during World War II, this series seeks to educate the public about important aspects of history and policy.

== Production ==
Citizen Soldier is created by Pritzker Military Museum and Library as part of the Library's mission to develop appropriate programs focusing on the Citizen Soldier in the preservation of democracy.

== Series overview ==
Season	Episodes	Originally aired	
Season	Episodes	First aired	Last aired
1	10	2013	2013
2	11	2014	2015
3	9	2020	2020

Two episodes from the second season won Telly Awards. The fourth episode, "The Tuskegee Airmen Of World War II" won in the Online Video category and the ninth episode, "The Next Battlefield: On Cyber War" received its prize in the Film & Video category.

== Episode list ==
=== Season 1 ===
No. overall	No. in season	Title	Hosted by	Panel members	Sponsored by	Original release date	Original record date
1	1	"The Reserves and the National Guard in the 21st Century"	Major General Andrew B. Davis	Colonel Paul Hastings, Major General William D. Razz Waff, Secretary Dennis M. McCarthy, Major General William M. Enyart,	Reserve Officers Association	TBA	10 May 2012
This program features a discussion of the United States Military Reserves and the National Guard in the 21st century.
1	2	"150 Years After the Emancipation Proclamation"	Kenneth Clarke	James McPherson James Cornelius	Abraham Lincoln Library and Museum Foundation	17 February 2013	28 September 2012
This program features a discussion about the military necessity of the Emancipation Proclamation.
1	3	"Into the Fire featuring Medal of Honor Recipient Dakota Meyer and Bing West"	Bing West	Dakota Meyer	Marine Corp Scholarship foundation	TBA	11 November 2012
A conversation between Medal of Honor recipient Sergeant Dakota Meyer and noted author Bing West about Meyer's experience in the battle of Ganjigal.
1	4	"Battle of Cantigny"	Dr. John Allen Williams	James Carl Nelson, Paul Herbert	First Division Museum at Cantigny	TBA	November 14, 2012
Dr. John Allen Williams moderates a discussion between James Carl Nelson, author of The Remains of Company D: A Story of the Great War and Paul Herbert, Executive Director of the First Division Museum at Cantigny about the WWI Battle of Cantigny and Colonel McCormick's legacy.
1	5	"Lake Michigan's Lost World War II Aircraft"	Bob Rasmussen	Taras Lyssenko, Captain Ed Ellis, Bill Marquardt	A&T Recovery, The Naval Aviation Foundation and Glenview Hangar One foundation	TBA	4 December 2012
This episode features a discussion about carrier qualifications during World War II and the ongoing efforts to recover and preserve the aircraft lost during the war.
1	6	"Changes And Challenges: Women In Today's Military"	Stacey Baca	Erica Borggren, Dr. Rebecca J. Hannagan, Kimberly Mitchell	Sponsored by Easter Seals, Inc with additional support from Chicago Foundation for Women.	25 September 2013	24 January 2013
This episode features a discussion of the issues female veterans encounter during and after service in the military.
1	7	"Max Hastings & Rick Atkinson: The Embedded Journalist And Military History"	Rick Atkinson	Sir Max Hastings	Norwich University	TBA	3 February 2013
This episode features a discussion between two historians and journalists about the role that embedded journalists play in military history.
1	8	"The War In The Atlantic And The U-505"	John Allen Williams	Marc Milner Stephen Budiansky Kurt Haunfelner	Museum of Science and Industry	TBA	4 February 2013
In this episode the panel discussed the Battle of the Atlantic from a global perspective.
1	9	"The POW Experience"	John Barr	John Borling, Donald E. Casey, Rhonda Cornum	Hillshire Brands	TBA	12 February 2013
This panel featured three American veterans who were prisoners of war in different conflicts. They discussed their experiences as POWs and how they endured their time in captivity.
1	10	"Nazi Concentration Camp Liberators"	Elizabeth Brackett	Dr. Waitman Beorn, Michael Hirsh, Dr. Keith Huxen, Major General William Levine, Dan Baker, Don Johnson	National WWII Museum	TBA	28 March 2013
This episode focuses on the liberation of concentration camps including first hand account by men who were there.

=== Season 2 ===
No. overall	No. in season	Title	Hosted by	Panel members	Sponsored by	Original release date	Original record date
2	1	"Refighting The Pacific War - Alternate History And The Battle Of Midway"	Jim Bresnahan	Elliot Carlson, John Lundstrom, and Jon Parshall	U.S. Naval Institute	TBA	29 March 2012
Jim Bresnahan leads a panel of historians in exploring an alternate history of World War II in this episode of Citizen Soldier. Panelists Elliot Carlson, John Lundstrom, and Jon Parshall discuss the "what if" questions surrounding the Battle of Midway.
2	2	"In Our Voices, Veterans From WWII, Vietnam, Iraq And Afghanistan"	Laura S. Washington	David H. Hymes James Mukoyama	Illinois Holocaust Museum and Education Center	TBA	11 November 2012
This episode features veterans discussing the ways in which military service has changed in the last 60 years, the ways in which it will never change, and how their sacrifice shapes our world today.
2	3	"Winston Churchill Is The Last Lion"	Greg Burns	Paul Reid	The Churchill Centre	TBA	28 February 2013
Paul Reid Discusses his book, " the Last Lion", Winston Churchill and Reid's relationship with the historian William Manchester.
2	4	"The Tuskegee Airmen Of World War II"	Dr. Daniel Haulman	Bob Jordan; O. Lawton Wilkerson	Seedlings Foundation	1 February 2015	12 September 2013
An exploration of the history and heritage of America's first black military aviators
2	5	""The Fiction Of War," With Tim O'Brien And Karl Marlantes"	Karl Marlantes	Tim O'Brien	Vietnam Veterans Memorial Fund	18 January 2015	15 November 2013
An insightful discussion by Vietnam veterans and award-winning fiction writers Tim O'Brien and Karl Marlantes on the subjects of literature, war, politics, and writing.
2	6	"The Big Red One On D-Day"	Paul Herbert	Joseph Balkoski, John C. McManus, and Steven Zaloga	First Division Museum At Cantigny Park	9 November 2014	13 March 2014
Leading historians discuss the United States Army " Big Red One" First Division History
2	7	"Navy SEALs: The Unspoken Sacrifice"	Kenneth Clark	Retired Vice Admiral Robert Harward Stephanie Freid-Perenchio Mike Martin	Stone Park by the Lake	25 January 2015	15 May 2015
Retired Vice Admiral Robert Harward discusses the SEAL experience with documentary photographer Stephanie Freid-Perenchio and SEAL Mike Martin
2	8	"On The Brink Of World War I: Citizen Soldier"	Dr. John Allen Williams	Doran Cart Dr. Nikolas Gardner Dr. Saje Mathieu	National World War I Museum at Liberty Memorial and Shook, Hardy, & Bacon through the Charles Bacon Fund.	16 November 2014	12 June 2014
Leading Historians Discuss the causes of the outbreak of the First World War
2	9	"Cyber War: The Next Battlefield"	Kenneth Clarke	Michael V. Hayden Jason Healey	Cyber Conflict Studies Association,	22 February 2015	26 September 2014
General Michael Hayden, a retired four-star Air Force General and former director of both the NSA and CIA, discusses with cyber security expert Jason Healey the rapidly evolving role played by technology in military, intelligence and counterintelligence operations.
2	10	"The Ongoing Story Of USS Pueblo, With Executive Officer Edward R. Murphy, Jr.: Citizen Soldier"	Dr. John Allen Williams	Edward R. Murphy, Jr.	Colonel (IL) J.N. Pritzker, IL ARNG (Retired) and Act One Mayne Stage.	8 February 2015	30 September 2014
Author and former Navy Lieutenant Edward R. Murphy Jr. shares his experiences as Second in Command aboard USS Pueblo, the American spy ship famously captured and held by North Korea since 1968.
2	11	"Never Forget: Antony Beevor And Rick Atkinson"	Rick Atkinson	Antony Beevor	Plante Moran	15 February 2015	7 November 2014
Two leading historians speak on the duty of documenting the past for future generations.
