= Good-bye Germany =

Song
- Language: English
- Published: 1918
- Songwriters: James Edwin McConnell and Lincoln McConnell

"Good-bye Germany" is a World War I song for voice and piano written and composed by James Edwin McConnell and Lincoln McConnell. The song was published in 1918 by Ted Browne Music Co., in Chicago, IL. The sheet music cover depicts Uncle Sam trampling the Kaiser Wilhelm I of Germany.

The sheet music can be found at the Pritzker Military Museum & Library.

== Bibliography ==
- Stubblebine, Donald J. 2002. Early Broadway sheet music: a comprehensive listing of published music from Broadway and other stage shows, 1843-1918. Jefferson, N.C.; London: McFarland. ISBN 0786411392 OCLC 248268846.
