= Perenchio =

Perenchio is a surname. Notable people with the surname include:

- Jerry Perenchio (1930–2017), American businessman and philanthropist
- Stephanie Freid-Perenchio, American independent documentary photographer
