= America's the Word for You and Me =

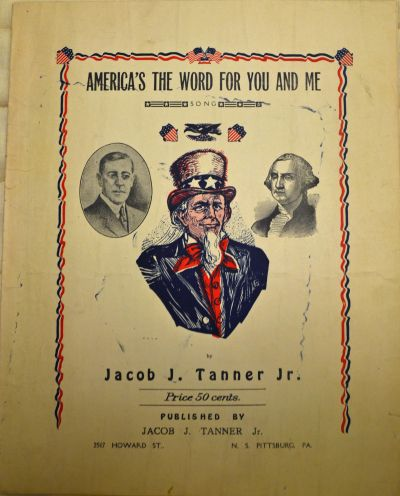
- Sheet music cover

Song
- Language: English
- Published: 1918
- Songwriter(s): Jacob J. Tanner Jr.

"America's the Word for You and Me" is a World War I song written composed by Jacob J. Tanner Jr. The song was published in 1918 by Jacob J. Tanner Jr., in Pittsburgh, Pennsylvania. The sheet music cover depicts a photo of President Wilson and the head of Uncle Sam with an inset of George Washington.

The sheet music can be found at the Pritzker Military Museum & Library.
