= General Grant's March =

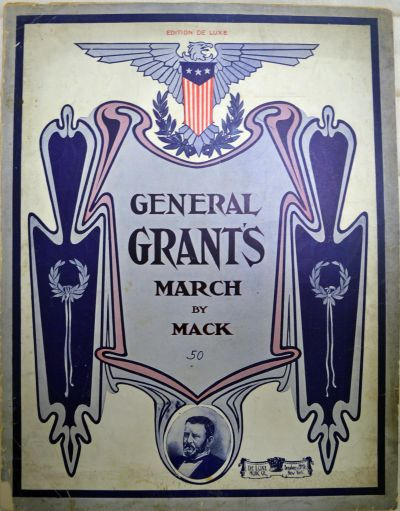
- Sheet Music cover

Song
- Language: English
- Published: between 1900–1920
- Composer(s): E. Mack

"General Grant's March" is a World War I era march song composed by E. Mack. It was written for piano and published between 1900 and 1920 by DeLuxe Music Co. in New York, NY. The "general Grant" in the title is Ulysses S. Grant, who was general during the American Civil War. The memory of his victory was meant to bring spirit to the soldiers through this song.

The sheet music can be found at the Pritzker Military Museum & Library.
