= Pride of America: A Military March =

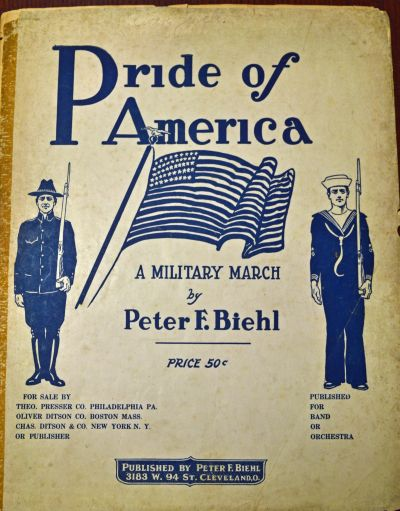
- Sheet Music cover

Song
- Language: English
- Published: 1915
- Songwriter(s): Peter F. Biehl

"Pride of America: A Military March" is a World War I song written and composed by Peter F. Biehl. In 1915, this song was self-published by Biehl in Cleveland, OH.

The sheet music cover depicts a soldier and a sailor separated by an American flag.

The sheet music can be found at the Pritzker Military Museum & Library.
