= I'm Giving You to Uncle Sam =

"I'm Giving You To Uncle Sam"
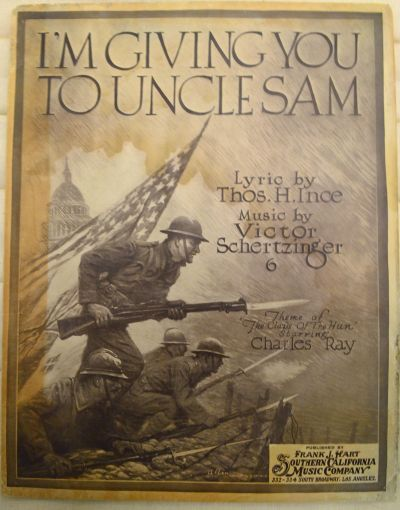
- Sheet Music cover

Song
- Language: English
- Published: 1918
- Songwriter(s): Lyricist: Thomas H. Ince; Composer: Victor Schertzinger

"I'm Giving You To Uncle Sam" is a World War I song written by Thomas H. Ince and composed by Victor Schertzinger. The song was published in 1918 by Southern California Music in Los Angeles, CA. The sheet music cover depicts soldiers charging out of a trench with the US Capitol and a flag in the background.

The sheet music can be found at the Pritzker Military Museum & Library.

== Bibliography ==
- Parker, Bernard S. World War I Sheet Music 1. Jefferson: McFarland & Company, Inc., 2007. ISBN 978-0-7864-2798-7. OCLC 71790113
- Vogel, Frederick G. World War I Songs: A History and Dictionary of Popular American Patriotic Tunes, with Over 300 Complete Lyrics. Jefferson: McFarland & Company, Inc., 1995. ISBN 0-89950-952-5. OCLC 32241433
