= Place a Candle in the Window 'Till Your Laddie Boy Comes Home =

1918 song written by Fern Glenn and composed by Maxwell Goldman

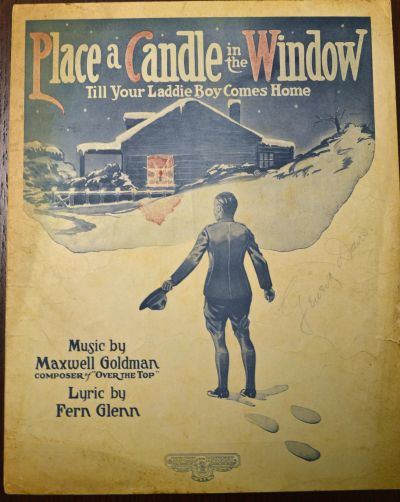
- Sheet music cover

Song
- Language: English
- Published: 1918
- Composer(s): Maxwell Goldman
- Lyricist(s): Fern Glenn

"Place a Candle in the Window 'Till Your Laddie Boy Comes Home" is a World War I song written by Fern Glenn and composed by Maxwell Goldman. The song was first published in 1918 by Buck & Lowney in New York, New York. The sheet music cover depicts a soldier returning to a snow covered house with a candle in the window.

The sheet music can be found at the Pritzker Military Museum & Library as well as the University of South Carolina.

== Bibliography ==
- Parker, Bernard S. (2007). World War I Sheet Music. Vol. 2. Jefferson: McFarland & Company, Inc. ISBN 978-0-7864-2799-4. OCLC 71790113.
- Vogel, Frederick G. (1995). World War I Songs: A History and Dictionary of Popular American Patriotic Tunes, with Over 300 Complete Lyrics. Jefferson: McFarland & Company, Inc. ISBN 0-89950-952-5. OCLC 32241433.
