= Mary Carty =

American songwriter

Mary F. Carty was an American musician, songwriter and music arranger.

She worked with N. A. W. Carty. She arranged "The Nation's Call for Humanity and Right". She also arranged "Good-bye, Old Glory's Calling Me".

== Bibliography ==
- Parker, Bernard S. (2007). World War I sheet music: 9,670 patriotic songs published in the United States, 1914-1920, with more than 600 covers illustrated. Jefferson: McFarland & Company, Inc. ISBN 9780786427987 OCLC 71790113
- Vogel, Frederick G. (1995). World War I Songs: A History and Dictionary of Popular American Patriotic Tunes, with Over 300 Complete Lyrics. Jefferson: McFarland & Company, Inc. ISBN 0-89950-952-5 OCLC 32241433
