= The Finest Flag That Flies =

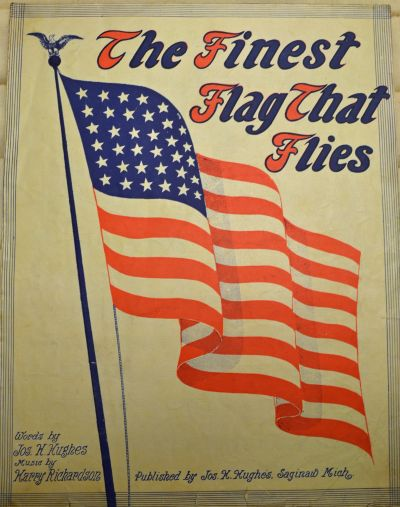
- Sheet Music cover

Song
- Language: English
- Published: 1914
- Composer(s): Harry Richardson
- Lyricist(s): Joseph H. Hughes

The Finest Flag That Flies is a World War I song written by Joseph H. Hughes and composed by Harry Richardson. The song was self-published in 1914 by Joseph H. Hughes in Saginaw, MI.

Two years after the song was first published the lyrics to the opening lines of the second verse were completely rewritten to reflect the American public's growing concern with World War I and growing anti-German feeling. The 1914 version was "There's things I saw so strange to me while I was o'er the sea--Drank beer in dear old Germany." In 1916 the words were changed to "There may be lands across the sea that have their flags so rare, But no flag e'er appealed to me."

The sheet music can be found at the Pritzker Military Museum & Library.

== Bibliography ==
- Parker, Bernard S. World War I Sheet Music 1. Jefferson: McFarland & Company, Inc., 2007. ISBN 978-0-7864-2798-7. OCLC 71790113
- Paas, John Roger. 2014. America sings of war: American sheet music from World War I. ISBN 9783447102780. OCLC 892462420
- Smith, R. Grant. 1998. From Saginaw Valley to Tin Pan Alley: Saginaw's contribution to American popular music, 1890-1955. Detroit: Wayne State Univ. Press. ISBN 0814326587 OCLC 231714501
