= Our Country's Voice Is Calling =

Song
- Language: English
- Published: 1917
- Composer(s): O. Ebel
- Lyricist(s): O. Ebel and Luella Stewart

Our Country's Voice Is Calling is a World War I march for voice and piano with drums and bugles ad libitum, written by O. Ebel and Luella Stewart with music by O. Ebel. The song was first published in 1917 by Chandler-Ebel Music Co., in Brooklyn, NY.

The sheet music can be found at the Pritzker Military Museum & Library.
