= When I Come Back to You (We'll Have a Yankee-Doodle Wedding) =

"When I Come Back To You (We'll Have A Yankee-Doodle Wedding)"

Song
- Language: English
- Published: 1918
- Songwriters: William Tracey & Jack Stern

When I Come Back To You (We'll Have A Yankee-Doodle Wedding) is a World War I song written and composed by William Tracey and Jack Stern. The song was first published in 1918 by Douglas & Newman Music in New York, NY. The sheet music cover depicts a soldier hugging a woman with the Liberty Bell in the background.

The sheet music can be found at the Pritzker Military Museum & Library.
