= America! My Home-Land =

Song
- Language: English
- Published: 1917
- Songwriter(s): Henry Treleaven
- Composer(s): Richard Blaine

"America! My Home-Land" is a World War I song written by Henry Treleaven and composed by Richard Blaine. This song was published in 1917 by Boosey & Co. in New York, NY.

The sheet music can be found at the Pritzker Military Museum & Library; digitized copies are available from the Newberry Library and from the Library of Congress

== Context ==
The surge of patriotism that accompanied World War I produced at least five songs with the title "America, My Homeland" (with varying punctuation). Two left no mark: Rosa Braun's song was copyrighted (on May 10, 1916) only in manuscript, and Ruth E. DeBoer's text was set and published (in July 1919) by Leo Friedman, a known song-shark. The other three appeared in close proximity: a song with words and music by Harry C. Eldridge and issued by his own firm, Eldridge Entertainment House in Franklin, OH (copyrighted September 20, 1917), a self-publication by Laura Walker Colgrove (copyrighted December 18, 1917), and the song by Treleaven and Blaine (also copyrighted December 18, 1917).

== History ==
Colgrove's song had negligible impact, but Eldridge promoted his title extensively and with considerable success. Eldridge advertised primarily in education journals; his song was relatively simple and could be successfully learned by young singers. Blaine's song was much more complex, approaching the status of an art song; it was issued in three keys and subsequently arranged by an illustrious organist, Sumner Salter, for four-part male chorus (copyrighted April 13, 1918) and for two-part female voices (copyrighted May 29, 1918). Eldridge's song was performed regionally as early as November 1917, but the Blaine-Treleaven publication was not promoted until early 1918. The latter was given additional impetus by the publication of Salter's arrangements later that year and was probably more widely heard in Salter's versions than as a solo song. After the armistice it persisted as an occasional piece sung on patriotic occasions; its last known performance was in 1927. Copyright on the solo song was allowed to expire, but Sumner Salter renewed the copyright for his two arrangements on December 18, 1945.
