= Our Boys and Girls March =

Song
- Language: English
- Published: 1903
- Songwriter: Joseph J. Kaiser

"Our Boys and Girls March" is an American patriotic song written and composed by Joseph J. Kaiser. The song was first published in 1903 by Jos. J. Kaiser Music Pub. Co. New York, NY. The sheet music cover reads, "dedicated to the school children of America."

The sheet music can be found at the Pritzker Military Museum & Library.
