= Look! Here Comes Our Fighters =

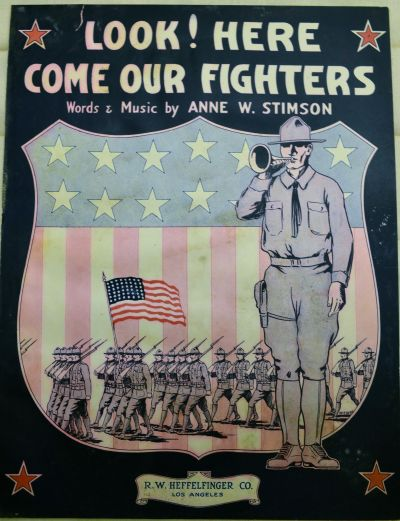
- Sheet Music cover

Song
- Language: English
- Published: 1918
- Songwriter(s): Anne W. Stimson

Look! Here Comes Our Fighters is a World War I song written and composed by Anne W. Stimson. The song was first published in 1918 by R.W. Heffelfinger Co., in Los Angeles, CA. The sheet music cover depicts a bugler with troops marching in background framed within a shield. The sheet music can be found at the Pritzker Military Museum & Library.
