= When the Fleet Comes Sailing Home =

1918 song written by Carl M. Legg and composed by Jay Flanagan

Song
- Language: English
- Published: 1918
- Composer(s): Jay Flanagan
- Lyricist(s): Carl M. Legg

"When the Fleet Comes Sailing Home" is a World War I song written by Carl M. Legg and composed by Jay Flanagan. The song was first published in 1918 by Songland Music in Brooklyn, New York City. The sheet music cover depicts a mother, wife, and son in uniform waving at an arriving transport ship.

The sheet music can be found at the Pritzker Military Museum & Library.
