= When the Sun Goes Down in Normandie (Then Is When I Sit and Dream of You) =

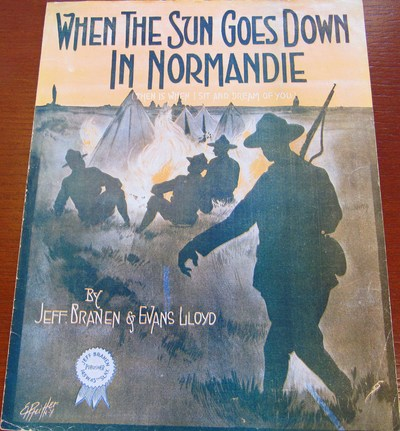

Song
- Language: English
- Released: 1918
- Label: Jeff Branen Publisher
- Composer: Evans Lloyd
- Lyricist: Jeff Branen

"When the Sun Goes Down in Normandie (Then Is When I Sit and Dream of You)" is a World War I era song released in 1918. Jeff Branen wrote the lyrics. Evans Lloyd composed the music. The song was published by Jeff Branen Publisher of New York, New York. The sheet music cover features a group of soldiers sitting around the camp fire. In the foreground is an armed soldier on guard duty walking through the campground. The song was written for both voice and piano.

The lyrics begins with a woman proudly declaring that her soldier boyfriend has sent her a letter. The chorus is the contents of the letter:

When the sun goes down in Normandy
And the campfires are all a-glow
I'm dreaming of my lady love
Who's so far away across the waters
One of America's fairest daughters
Gee! Tonight I'm lonesome and blue
and gee! I know that you're lonesome too
When the sun goes down in Normandy
Then is when I sit and dream of you

The sheet music can be found at Pritzker Military Museum & Library.
