= Military Waltz =

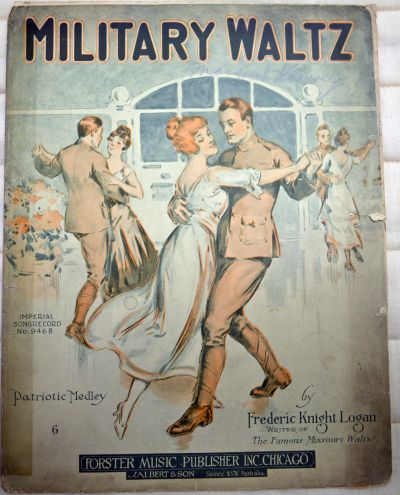
- Sheet Music cover

Song
- Language: English
- Published: 1917
- Songwriter(s): Frederic Knight Logan

"Military Waltz" is a World War I song composed by Frederic Knight Logan. This song was published in 1917 by F.J.A. Forster, in Chicago, Illinois. The sheet music cover features three soldiers dancing with women in a ballroom.

The sheet music can be found at the Pritzker Military Museum & Library.

== Bibliography ==
- Parker, Bernard S. World War I Sheet Music 1. Jefferson: McFarland & Company, Inc., 2007. ISBN 978-0-7864-2798-7. OCLC 71790113
- Vogel, Frederick G. World War I Songs: A History and Dictionary of Popular American Patriotic Tunes, with Over 300 Complete Lyrics. Jefferson: McFarland & Company, Inc., 1995. ISBN 0-89950-952-5. OCLC 32241433
