= We'll Never Let Our Old Flag Fall =

Song
- Language: English
- Published: 1915
- Songwriters: Albert E. MacNutt, M. F. Kelly

"We'll Never Let Our Old Flag Fall" is a World War I song written by Albert E. MacNutt and composed by M. F. Kelly. The song was first published in 1915 by Chappell & Co., in New York, NY. The sheet music cover was illustrated by Starmer and features words with an eagle on a shield.

The sheet music can be found at the Pritzker Military Museum & Library.

== Bibliography ==
- Parker, Bernard S. (2007). World War I Sheet Music 1. Jefferson: McFarland & Company, Inc. ISBN 978-0-7864-2798-7. OCLC 71790113
- Paas, John Roger (2014). America Sings of War: American Sheet Music from World War I. ISBN 9783447102780. OCLC 892462420
