= Descriptive Fantasie on the Battles of Chattanooga, Lookout Mountain, and Missionary Ridge =

"Descriptive Fantasie on the Battles of Chattanooga, Lookout Mountain and Missionary Ridge"

Song
- Language: English
- Published: 1889
- Composer(s): Alberto Riveri

"Descriptive Fantasie on the Battles of Chattanooga, Lookout Mountain and Missionary Ridge" is a piano score arranged by Alberto Riveri. The score was published in 1889 by P.R. McCargo & Co., in Boston, MA.

The sheet music can be found at the Pritzker Military Museum & Library.
