= Krewasky Salter =

American army colonel

Krewasky A. Salter
- Military career
- Allegiance: United States
- Branch: United States Army
- Rank: Colonel
- Other work: Museum executive and curator

Krewasky A. Salter is a retired United States Army Colonel, museum curator and military historian. He served as the executive director of the First Division Museum. In 2022, he was appointed president of the Pritzker Military Museum & Library.

== Education ==
Salter earned a Bachelor of Science degree from the University of Florida, an M.A. and Ph.D. from Florida State University, and a Master of Strategic Studies from the Air War College.

== Career ==
Salter has taught Military History at the United States Military Academy, West Point; Military Strategy at the Command and General Staff College, Leavenworth; Military Leadership at Howard University, Washington, D.C.; and African American History at several other institutions as an adjunct professor.

Before retiring from the military in 2010, Salter served twenty five years on active duty including a tour at the Pentagon.

As a guest curator at the Smithsonian Institution's National Museum of African American History and Culture, Salter curated the museum's exhibition, Double Victory: The African American Military Experience.

== Works ==
- Combat Multipliers: African-American Soldiers in Four Wars. CSI Press. 2003.
- The story of Black military officers, 1861-1948. New York. 2014. ISBN 978-0415716314.
