= William Attwood =

American writer and diplomat (1919–1989)

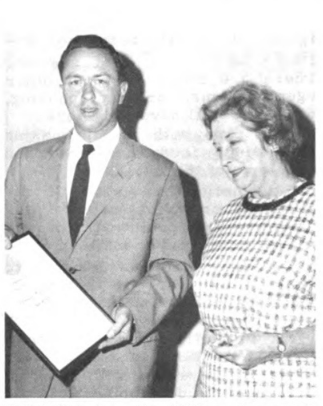
- Attwood with Doris M. Luellen, the Embassy's Central Budget and Management Officer in 1965

2nd United States Ambassador to Guinea
- In office April 26, 1961 – May 27, 1963
- President: John F. Kennedy
- Preceded by: John H. Morrow
- Succeeded by: James I. Loeb

1st United States Ambassador to Kenya
- In office March 2, 1964 – May 1, 1966
- President: Lyndon B. Johnson
- Succeeded by: Glenn W. Ferguson

Personal details
- Born: William Hollingsworth Attwood; July 14, 1919 Paris, France
- Died: April 15, 1989 (aged 69) New Canaan, Connecticut, U.S.
- Party: Democratic
- Spouse: Simone Cadgene (m. 1950)
- Education: Princeton University
- Known for: Journalist, author, editor and diplomat

William Hollingsworth Attwood (July 14, 1919 – April 15, 1989) was an American journalist, writer, editor and diplomat, who served both as the U.S. Ambassador to Guinea and Kenya during the Kennedy and Johnson administrations, respectively.

== Early life and education ==
Attwood was born in Paris, France. He received his education at Choate Rosemary Hall in Wallingford, Connecticut and then Princeton University in Princeton, New Jersey, where he was appointed editor of The Daily Princetonian and later served as a Princeton trustee.

== Career ==
=== Early life and career ===
Attwood served as a paratrooper in World War II.

=== Writer and journalist ===
After the war's end, Attwood wrote for the New York Herald Tribune and soon was transferred to the Paris bureau of the international edition. His first book, The Man Who Could Grow Hair, or Inside Andorra, was a memoir-based series of tales of his adventures in post-war Europe.

In 1955, after returning to the United States, he published a memoir of his children's impressions of America, Still the Most Exciting Country.

=== Adlai Stevenson and John F. Kennedy ===
Adlai Stevenson recruited Attwood to serve as a speechwriter and advisor for his 1952 and 1956 presidential campaigns, and to write other speeches in 1960. Stevenson and Attwood were close friends and collaborators for years. Attwood accompanied Stevenson on a trip around the world sponsored by Look magazine, writing regular articles about Stevenson's travels that appeared in that magazine.

When John F. Kennedy became the 1960 Democratic nominee, Attwood joined his campaign for president.

Early in the Kennedy administration, Attwood was appointed to serve as ambassador to Guinea. He was forced to return to the United States after a near fatal case of polio, which resulted in him having a permanent limp. But he recovered and returned to Guinea.

In 1963, as the Kennedy administration sought to negotiate détente with Fidel Castro in Cuba, Attwood served as a secret liaison. Attwood had discussions with the Cuban UN ambassador in New York. He was due to report to the president after Kennedy returned from Dallas, where he was assassinated. The Johnson administration subsequently discontinued the effort. Attwood served a second appointment as ambassador during the Johnson administration, to Kenya. He published a book about the relationship of Kenyan politics and communism, The Reds and the Blacks.

Attwood worked with Cowles Communications, serving in various editorial capacities at Look. In 1970, he was appointed editor of Newsday, the Melville, New York-based daily newspaper on Long Island. He later founded Newsday's New York City edition, designed to compete with the city's primary dailies, New York Post and The New York Times.

Upon retirement in 1979, Attwood focused on writing, and serving the Town Council in his hometown of New Canaan, Connecticut. After covering the Geneva Summit between Reagan and Gorbachev in 1987, Attwood published his final book, The Twilight Struggle: Tales of the Cold War, which chronicled his unique view of the Cold War from its beginning to its presumable end.

Attwood died from congestive heart failure in New Canaan on April 15, 1989.

== Legacy ==
The Public Library in Attwood's hometown of New Canaan annually hosts the Attwood Memorial Lecture, which features speakers who reflect his own passions for the intersection of journalism and politics. Speakers have included Art Buchwald, Doris Kearns Goodwin, and Jonathan Alter.

Attwood's papers are held by the State Historical Society of Wisconsin.

== Books by Attwood ==
- The Man Who Could Grow Hair Alfred A. Knopf, 1949
- Still the Most Exciting Country Alfred A Knopf, 1955
- The Decline of the American Male (contributor to essay collection with other Look editors) Random House, 1958
- The Reds and the Blacks Harper & Row, 1967
- The Fairly Scary Adventure Book (children's book) HarperCollins, 1969
- Making It Through Middle Age Atheneum Books, 1982
- The Twilight Struggle: Tales of the Cold War HarperCollins, 1987

== Personal life ==
Attwood married Simone Cadgene in Paris in 1950, and the couple had three children: Peter, Janet, and Susan.

Diplomatic posts
Preceded by John H. Morrow	United States Ambassador to Guinea; 1961–1963	Succeeded by James I. Loeb
Preceded by office created	United States Ambassador to Kenya; 1964–1966	Succeeded by Glenn W. Ferguson
