= The Liberation Trilogy =

Military history books by Rick Atkinson

First editions

The Liberation Trilogy is a series of military history books about the United States' involvement in World War II, written by American author Rick Atkinson and published by Henry Holt & Co.

The first volume, An Army at Dawn, won the 2003 Pulitzer Prize for History and was a New York Times best seller. The Day of Battle, the second book, was also a New York Times best seller, and the final installment, The Guns at Last Light, debuted at the top of the Hardcover Nonfiction list.

== Books ==
1. An Army at Dawn: The War in North Africa, 1942–1943 (2002)
2. The Day of Battle: The War in Sicily and Italy, 1943–1944 (2007)
3. The Guns at Last Light: The War in Western Europe, 1944–1945 (2013)

== Similar or related works ==
- Allies at War by Tim Bouverie (2025)
- The Second World War by Antony Beevor (2012).
- Inferno: The World at War, 1939-1945 by Max Hastings (2011).
- The Storm of War by Andrew Roberts (2009).
