= An Army at Dawn =

Non-fiction work by Rick Atkinson

- Author: Rick Atkinson
- Series: The Liberation Trilogy
- Genre: Non-fiction
- Publisher: Henry Holt and Company
- Publication date: 2002
- Pages: 704
- ISBN: 978-1-4104-6321-0
- OCLC: 49383747
- Followed by: The Day of Battle: The War in Sicily and Italy, 1943–1944

An Army at Dawn: The War in North Africa, 1942–1943 is a Pulitzer Prize–winning book written in 2002 by long-time Washington Post correspondent Rick Atkinson. The book is a history of the North African Campaign, particularly focused on the role of the United States military. The book follows the early planning stages of the Allied invasion (Operation Torch) of North Africa, the landings in Casablanca, Oran, and Algiers, and finally the back and forth struggle for dominance in Tunisia. Atkinson constructs his narrative from letters, newspaper articles, and personal diaries of commanders, soldiers, and others on the ground in northern Africa. The book discusses the battlefield failings and successes of American troops and their commanders and the larger context of the burgeoning cooperation between the Allied forces in World War II.

The book received the 2003 Pulitzer Prize for History.

An Army at Dawn is the first volume of The Liberation Trilogy. The Day of Battle: The War in Sicily and Italy, 1943–1944, published in 2007, is the second volume. The third and final volume, The Guns at Last Light: The War in Western Europe, 1944–1945, was released on May 14, 2013.
