= Jeffrey Sammons =

American historian and professor (born 1949)

Dr. Jeffrey Sammons Ph.D.
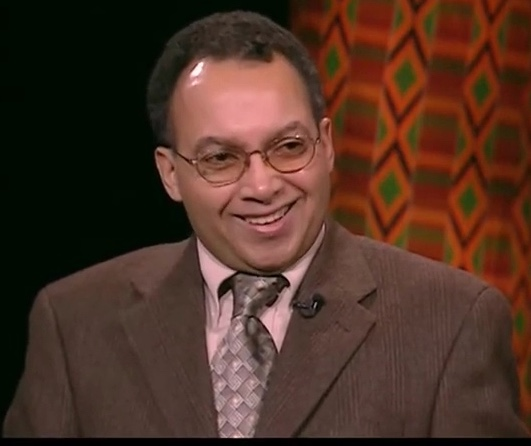
- Sammons on CUNY TV's African American Legends, 2005
- Born: Jeffrey Thomas Sammons
- Education: Rutgers College (BA), Tufts University (MA), University of North Carolina (Ph.D.)
- Occupations: Professor of History and Historian
- Employer: New York University
- Spouse: Mariam Nassadien
- Children: Adam N. Sammons
- Writing career
- Subjects: African-American history, military history, film history, sports history
- Notable work: Beyond the Ring: the Role of Boxing in American Society Harlem's Rattlers and the Great War: The Undaunted 369th Regiment and the African American Quest for Equality

Jeffrey Thomas Sammons (born 1949) is an American historian and professor. His areas of research and interest include African-American history, military history, and sports history. He is the author of Beyond the Ring: The Role of Boxing in American Society and co-author of Harlem's Rattlers and the Great War: The Undaunted 369th Regiment and the African American Quest for Equality. He is currently a professor of history at New York University (NYU).

== Education ==
In 1967, Sammons graduated from Bridgeton High School in New Jersey. He earned his Bachelor of Arts degree in history from Rutgers College. He graduated magna cum laude and was elected to the Phi Beta Kappa honor society in 1971. Three years later, Sammons graduated from Tufts University with his master's degree in history. In 1982, after earning various fellowships, he graduated from the University of North Carolina with his Ph.D. in American history.

== Career ==
=== Educator ===
After graduating from the University of North Carolina, Sammons worked at the University of Houston as an assistant professor of history. From 1983 to 1984, he was the postdoctoral fellow at the University of Cape Town in South Africa. He has also taught at Princeton University and Hollins College. Since 1989, Sammons has taught history at NYU. For some time, he served as the NYU history department director of graduate studies.

He is involved with numerous foundations and fundraisers, such as the Julius Chamber Invitational for the NAACP Legal Defense and Educational Fund, Clearview Legacy Foundation, and USGA/PGA African-American Golf Archive. Sammons holds the positions of president and secretary of the Beta chapter of Phi Beta Kappa at NYU. He is also the national senator of the Phi Beta Kappa Society. Currently, Sammons is a history adviser for the World War I Centennial Commission. He is a member of the museum and library committee of the US Golf Association.

=== Writer ===
In 1987, as a Henry Rutgers Research Fellow, Sammons finished writing his first book Beyond the Ring: The Role of Boxing in American Society.

His 2001 research fellowship from the Schomburg Center for Research in Black Culture and History and 2001 National Endowment for the Humanities fellowship led him to thoroughly research and write the book Harlem's Rattlers and the Great War: The Undaunted 369th Regiment and the African American Quest for Equality with historian Dr. John H. Morrow, Jr.

Sammons has served on the editorial boards of the publications The Journal of Sport History and Sport and Social Issues.

He has been a consultant for various documentary projects and television programs, including the PBS program American Experience.

As of 2014, he was working on a book about race and golf.

== Publications ==
- Beyond the Ring: The Role of Boxing in American Society (1988). ISBN 978-0252014734
- "Race and Sport: A Critical Historical Examination" published in Journal of Sport History (1994)
- "Rebel with a Cause: Muhammad Ali as a Sixties Protest Symbol" published in Muhammad Ali, the People's Champ (1995). ISBN 978-0252021886
- Harlem's Rattlers and the Great War: The Undaunted 369th Regiment and the African American Quest for Equality (2014) with John H. Morrow, Jr. ISBN 978-0700619573

== Personal life ==
Sammons lives in New York City. He is married to Mariam Nassadien and they have one child.
