= Pritzker Literature Award =

The Pritzker Literature Award for Lifetime Achievement in Military Writing
- Awarded for: Lifetime Achievement in Military Writing
- Sponsored by: http://www.tawanifoundation.org/LTA/
- Date: Annual
- Country: United States
- Presented by: Pritzker Military Museum & Library
- Reward: $100,000
- First award: 2007
- Website: http://www.pritzkermilitary.org/explore/pritzker-literature-award/

The Pritzker Literature Award for Lifetime Achievement in Military Writing (formerly Pritzker Military Library Literature Award 2007-2013) is a literary award given annually by the Pritzker Military Museum & Library. First awarded in 2007, it is a lifetime achievement award for military writing, sponsored by the Tawani Foundation of Chicago. The prize is valued at $100,000, making it one of the richest literary prizes in the world.

== Honorees ==
- 2007: James M. McPherson
- 2008: Allan R. Millett
- 2009: Gerhard Weinberg
- 2010: Rick Atkinson
- 2011: Carlo D'Este
- 2012: Sir Max Hastings
- 2013: Tim O'Brien
- 2014: Antony Beevor
- 2015: David Hackett Fischer
- 2016: Hew Strachan
- 2017: Peter Paret
- 2018: Dennis Showalter
- 2019: John H. Morrow Jr.
- 2020: David M. Glantz
- 2021: Margaret MacMillan
- 2023: Craig L. Symonds
