= The Nation's Call for Humanity and Right =

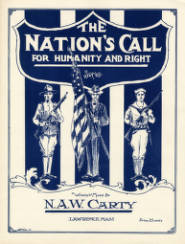
- Sheet music cover

Song
- Language: English
- Published: 1918
- Songwriter: N.A.W. Carty

The Nation's Call for Humanity and Right is a World War I song written by N.A.W. Carty. It was published in 1918 by N.A.W. Carty in Lawrence, Massachusetts. The sheet music cover depicts a sailor and a soldier on either side of a civilian holding a flag.

The piece was written for two voices (1st & 2nd soprano) and piano.

The sheet music can be found at the Pritzker Military Museum & Library.
