= Speed (1936 film) =

1936 film by Edwin L. Marin

- 1936 movie herald, Tagline: Romance at 300 miles per hour!
- Directed by: Edwin L. Marin
- Written by: Michael Fessier; Milton Krims (story); Lawrence P. Bachman (story) (as Larry Bachman)
- Produced by: Lucien Hubbard
- Starring: James Stewart; Wendy Barrie; Una Merkel; Weldon Heyburn; Ted Healy; Ralph Morgan
- Cinematography: Lester White
- Edited by: Ben Lewis
- Music by: Edward Ward
- Production company: Metro-Goldwyn-Mayer
- Distributed by: Loew's Inc.
- Release date: May 8, 1936
- Running time: 65 (alternately 70, 72) minutes (Black and white)
- Country: United States
- Language: English

Speed is a 1936 Metro-Goldwyn-Mayer action film directed by Edwin L. Marin. It starred James Stewart, in his first starring role, and Wendy Barrie. Although only a low-budget "B" movie, the film was notable for its realistic cinematography by Lester White, incorporating scenes from the Indianapolis 500 race and on-location shooting at the Muroc dry lake bed, used for high-speed racing by "hot rodders" in the 1930s. Advance publicity trumpeted that Stewart drove the specially-prepared "Falcon" to 140 mph (230 km/h).

== Plot ==
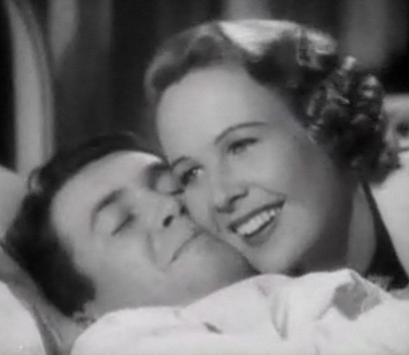
Wendy Barrie and James Stewart

Auto mechanic Terry Martin, the chief car tester for Emery Motors in Detroit, is working on his own time to perfect a revolutionary design for a new carburetor. Automotive engineer Frank Lawson is a rival for the attention of Jane Mitchell, who has just been hired to work in the publicity department. Terry has little formal education and resents inferences that his knowledge of cars is inferior to that of the trained Lawson. He nearly loses his job when he makes a jealous spectacle of himself at a company dinner dance that Jane attends with Frank.

Working out the bugs of the new carburetor proves to be troublesome for Terry and his fellow in-car riding mechanic "Gadget" Haggerty. Jane, attracted to Terry despite his "inferiority complex", arranges with company vice president Mr. Dean to have the work financed by Emery, on the condition that Frank be added to the team. Their car races in the Indianapolis 500 to test the carburetor despite Terry's hunch that something is still wrong with it. Fighting for the lead, it ends up crashing, injuring Terry and nearly killing Gadget. Terry blames Frank, who insisted the car was ready, until Jane reveals she pulled strings to have Frank included in the project. Thinking that she loves Frank and wanted him to get all the credit for success, Terry angrily sends her away.

While Terry is recovering from his injury, Jane goes to bat for him. Emery's board of trustees have suspended further financing for the carburetor, but Jane gets their decision reversed, since she is secretly Jane Emery, the niece and heiress of the company's owner. In a new car designed to make a world speed record at the Muroc Dry Lake in California, Terry proves that his design works but nearly loses his life in the attempt. When a fuel pipe cracks, choking fumes are funneled into the cockpit causing the record run to end prematurely. Terry is severely injured. With only minutes to save his life, Frank places him in the car and drives it to the Muroc hospital at high speed, completing the world record run in the process. Terry is finally vindicated and wins the girl as well.

== Cast ==
As appearing in screen credits (main roles identified):

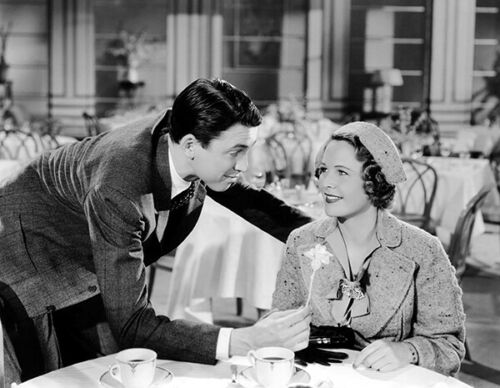
James Stewart and Wendy Barrie

Actor	Role
James Stewart	Terry Martin
Wendy Barrie	Jane Mitchell / Jane Emery
Una Merkel	Josephine "Jo" Sanderson
Weldon Heyburn	Frank Lawson
Ted Healy	Clarence Maxmillian "Gadget" Haggerty (Note: Ted Healy was famous for creating The Three Stooges vaudeville and movie comedy act. In one scene, Healy lets out a Stooge's trademark, "whoo, whoo.")
Ralph Morgan	Mr. Dean
Patricia Wilder (film debut)	Fanny Lane
Robert Livingston	George Saunders
Walter Kingsford	Edward Emery
George Chandler	"Shorty", Bystander At Barn Dance
Isabelle Keith	Nurse (uncredited)

== Production ==
Screenshot of Emery "Falcon" race car, designed and driven in the film by Harlan Fengler, a retired racer and riding mechanic.

Principal photography took place at the MGM studio, its Culver City, California, backlot, and on location from March 20 to April 7, 1936. MGM had wanted to develop a film with a speed-racing theme to capitalize on worldwide headlines about Malcolm Campbell breaking the world's speed record for an automobile in his "Blue Bird", on September 3, 1935 at the Bonneville Salt Flats. (Note: During the 1930s, both the Bonneville Salt Flats and dry lake beds in California alternatively served as sites for high-speed automotive testing and record-setting.)For the sake of convenience and with a limited budget, Speed instead used the nearby Muroc, California area to recreate the film's record-breaking runs.

Scenes of the actual Indianapolis 500 were used from an earlier era when riding mechanics had to be incorporated in the race cars. The Emery "Falcon" world speed record race car transposed to the similar testing area, the Muroc dry lake bed, (Note: The dry lake beds, Rosamond Lake and Rogers Dry Lake that are found in the Muroc area, later became the emergency landing fields of the Edwards Air Force Base, used to test high-speed United States Air Force aircraft.) was designed and built by Harlan Fengler, a retired racer and riding mechanic. He built the car to make an attempt at the land speed record but, after investing $100,000, ran out of money. Later he would become the Chief Steward of the Indy 500. The realistic sequences of an automobile factory that begin the film were shot in advance at Chrysler. The production company was able to film at the Chrysler factory in Detroit, and show the latest model Chrysler Airflow cars produced in the assembly line and the use of the testing grounds.

For Stewart, in his first starring role, he later recalled, "The only way to learn to act is to act ... For instance, I would have a tiny part in a big picture with stars like Clark Gable and Jean Harlow and others, and then I would have a big part in a tiny picture [Speed] and so on." During a hectic period, from 1935 to 1939, Stewart appeared in 29 motion pictures. The roles spanned a wide gamut of characters, from a mechanic/speed driver as he portrayed in Speed to that of a detective, doctor, executive, farmer, football star, lawyer, newspaperman, rustic "hayseed", soldier/sailor, skater, teacher, and even a murderer. Stewart considered Speed a good training ground, "I did a picture called 'Speed' which gave me my first leading role ... although it was a low-budget picture ... and Ted Healy, who played my best friend, told me, 'Think of the audience as partners ... as collaborators ... not just watchers. You have to involve them'." (Note: In a longer appraisal of his time at MGM, Stewart continued, "So when I was acting, I was playing to this invisible audience. I imagined them. I didn't get all of this right straight away. I had to work at it. You Learn your craft ... and you only get better by working at it.")

== Reception ==
Critics dismissed the film as passable at best, citing that the plot was weak and moved too slowly, the supporting cast was substandard, and the use of stock footage made it more of a documentary than a drama while at the same time appearing uncredible. Variety wrote that it was, "...too news reely to get more than passing interest" and that while the film offered a new romantic lead, film audiences were not interested in debuts. Howard Barnes of the New York Herald-Tribune called it "a very ordinary Hollywood stencil", while Frank Nugent of The New York Times stated that "Mr. Stewart [and the rest of the cast] perform as pleasantly as possible."

== Home media ==
Occasionally broadcast on Turner Classic Movies, Speed has also been released on DVD by Warner Archive, with an accompanying short, The Bottle and the Throttle (1968), a U.S. educational film, on the ramifications of drinking and driving.
