= Nellie Morrow Parker =

First African American school teacher in Bergen County, New Jersey

- Born: August 27, 1902
- Died: January 25, 1998 (aged 95)
- Occupation: Teacher

Nellie K. Morrow with her husband, William L. Parker, and their child, circa 1927

Nellie K. Morrow Parker (August 27, 1902 – January 25, 1998) was the first African American school teacher in Bergen County, New Jersey. Part of the Hackensack Public Schools, Nellie K. Parker Elementary School in Hackensack, New Jersey is named after her.

== Birth ==
She was born as Nellie K. Morrow to Mary A. (1875-?) and John Eugene Morrow (1873-?) aka Eugene Morrow, on August 27, 1902, in Hackensack, New Jersey. John was the janitor of the Johnson Public Library at 274 Main Street in Hackensack and also a minister . He was born in North Carolina. Nellie had the following siblings: Eugene Abram Morrow (1897-?); E. Frederic Morrow (1907–1994), the first African American to hold an executive position at the White House; John H. Morrow, Sr. (1910-2000), the first United States ambassador to independent Guinea; and William H. Morrow (1910-?).

Morrow graduated from Hackensack High School and graduated from Montclair Normal School (now Montclair State University) in 1922 with a certificate in teaching.

== Teacher ==
Nellie Morrow Parker became the first African-American public school teacher in Bergen County, New Jersey in 1922 when she was hired to teach the fifth and sixth grades in the Hackensack, New Jersey public school system. Nellie remained in the Hackensack school system for 42 years. During this entire time span, she moved only once from First Street School to the Beech Street School. During her early years of teaching she and her family were subject to racism from the Ku Klux Klan and other organizations.

== Marriage ==
In 1928 she married William L. Parker (1900-?) of Virginia. William worked as a salesman for a life insurance company.

== Death ==
She died in 1998 in Huntington Beach, California.
