= Carlo D'Este =

American military historian (1936–2020)

- Born: Carlo Winthrop D'Este; August 29, 1936; Oakland, California, U.S.
- Died: November 22, 2020 (aged 84); Cape Cod, Massachusetts, U.S.
- Education: New Mexico Military Institute junior college, 1956; Norwich University magna cum laude, 1958; University of Richmond master's, 1974
- Occupations: Military historian Biographer; Military officer
- Title: Lieutenant Colonel, USA (Ret.)
- Spouse: Shirley D'Este
- Children: 4

Carlo Winthrop D'Este (August 29, 1936 – November 22, 2020) was an American military historian and biographer, author of several books, especially on World War II. He was a decorated U.S. Army lieutenant colonel. In 2011, he was awarded the Pritzker Literature Award for Lifetime Achievement in Military Writing. D'Este died at age 84 in Cape Cod, Massachusetts.

== Education ==
D'Este attended New Mexico Military Institute junior college in 1956. He received his B.A. (magna cum laude) from Norwich University in 1958, an M.A. from the University of Richmond in 1974, and an honorary doctorate of humane letters from Norwich in 1992. He received his master's from University of Richmond in 1974 and then attended University of London under the G.I. bill.

== Career and other work ==
- Military historian and biographer, 1978–2020
- Member of Department of the Army Historical Advisory Committee
- Honorary member, Board of Fellows of Norwich University
- President of the Friends of Norwich Library
- Elected trustee of Mashpee Public Library, Mashpee, Massachusetts for 21 years
- United States Army, tours of duty in Germany and Vietnam, retired as lieutenant colonel, 1978.
- Lecturer at School of Advanced Military Studies, United States Army Command and General Staff College
- Founded (with W.E.B. Griffin) the William E. Colby Military Writers' Symposium (1996), which presents the Colby Award.
- Advised President of the United States Bill Clinton on his visit to Italy, England, and Normandy (1994)

== Awards and honors ==
He was awarded the Andrew J. Goodpaster Prize by the American Veterans Center, 2010.

He delivered the annual Kemper Lecture on Winston Churchill at Westminster College, Fulton, Missouri, 2010.

In 2011, he received the $100,000 Pritzker Literature Award for Lifetime Achievement in Military Writing. The award includes an honorarium, citation and medallion. It is sponsored by the Chicago-based Tawani Foundation. As part of the award, he gave an interview at the Pritzker Military Museum & Library on October 21, 2011, reflecting on his writing career in the field of World War II scholarship.

== Writings ==
- Decision in Normandy: The Unwritten Story of Montgomery and the Allied Campaign, Dutton (New York, NY), 1983. ISBN 9780060924959
- Bitter Victory: The Battle for Sicily, 1943, Dutton (New York, NY), 1988. ISBN 9780525244714
- World War II in the Mediterranean, 1942–1945, Algonquin (Chapel Hill, NC), 1990. ISBN 9780945575047
- Fatal Decision: Anzio and the Battle for Rome, HarperCollins (New York, NY), 1991. ISBN 9780060158903
- Patton: A Genius for War, HarperCollins (New York, NY), 1995. ISBN 9780060164553
- Eisenhower: A Soldier's Life, 1890–1945, Henry Holt (New York, NY), 2002. ISBN 9780805056860
- Warlord: A life of Winston Churchill at War, 1874–1945 (1st ed.). New York City, New York: HarperCollins. November 2008. ISBN 978-0-06-057573-1.
- (introduction to) "Sicilia 1943. Lo sbarco alleato" by Ezio Costanzo (author), Le Nove Muse Editrice (Catania, Italy), 2003
- (introduction to) Battle, the Story of the Bulge, John Toland, Random House (New York, NY), 1959
- (contributor to) Few Returned: Twenty-eight Days on the Russian Front, Winter 1942–1943, edited by Eugenio Corti, University of Missouri Press (Columbia, MO), 1997.
- D'Este, Carlo (July 25, 2004). "Warsaw Will Be Liquidated". The New York Times. Review of Rising '44. The Battle for Warsaw, by Norman Davies.

== Decorations ==
- Hall of Fame, New Mexico Military Institute, 2002
- Norwich University, D.H.L., 1992
- Board of Fellows Service Medallion, Norwich University, 2008

Legion of Merit
Bronze Star with oak leaf cluster
Meritorious Service Medal
Army Commendation Medal
