= John H. Morrow =

American diplomat (1910–2000)

John Howard Morrow
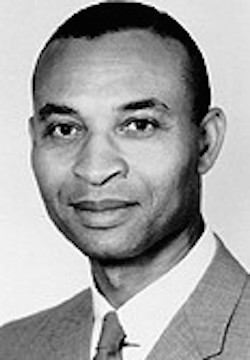

United States Ambassador to Guinea
- In office 1959–1961
- Appointed by: Dwight Eisenhower
- Preceded by: Position established
- Succeeded by: William Attwood

Personal details
- Born: February 5, 1910 Hackensack, New Jersey, U.S.
- Died: January 11, 2000 (aged 89) Fountain Valley, California, U.S.
- Party: Republican
- Relations: E. Frederic Morrow (brother)
- Children: 2, including John H. Morrow Jr.
- Education: Rutgers University; University of Pennsylvania

John Howard Morrow Sr. (February 5, 1910 – January 11, 2000) was an American diplomat.

== Career ==
In 1959, President Dwight Eisenhower appointed him the first ambassador to independent Guinea. Morrow was the first Black ambassador from the USA to an African country other than Liberia. He became the first representative of the United States in the United Nations Educational, Scientific and Cultural Organization (UNESCO) during the administration of President John F. Kennedy. At the time, he was one of a small number of African American high-level diplomats.

== Personal life ==
Born in Hackensack, New Jersey, Morrow graduated from Rutgers University in 1931 and earned graduate degrees from the University of Pennsylvania, a master's in 1942 and a Ph.D. in 1952.

He was the brother of E. Frederic Morrow, the first African-American to hold an executive position in the White House; and Nellie Morrow Parker, the first African-American public school teacher in Bergen County, New Jersey. His son, John H. Morrow Jr., is a professor of history at the University of Georgia. His daughter is Jean Rowena.

Morrow was a member of Alpha Phi Alpha fraternity.

His memoir is entitled First American Ambassador to Guinea (1959-1961).

Diplomatic posts
Preceded by Established	United States Ambassador to Guinea; 1959–1961	Succeeded by William Attwood
