= James Dietz =

American painter (born 1946)

- Born: 1946 (age 79–80); San Francisco, California, U.S.
- Education: Art Center College of Design
- Occupation: Artist

James Dietz (born 1946), also known as Jim Dietz, is a contemporary artist known for his history paintings, particularly of subjects from the First and Second World Wars. He has been a member of the World War I Aviation Historical Hall of Fame, served as a board member of the Automotive Fine Artists of America. He has received awards for his work from the American Society of Aviation Artists and other arts organizations.

== Early career ==
Dietz was born in San Francisco, California. He graduated from the Art Center College of Design in 1969. Following his graduation, Dietz moved to Los Angeles to work as a commercial illustrator. His work ranged from "automobile ads, movie posters, and romantic and historical/action book covers". After working in New York, Dietz and his family moved to Seattle in 1978. At this time he started to specialize in aviation art.

== Major works ==
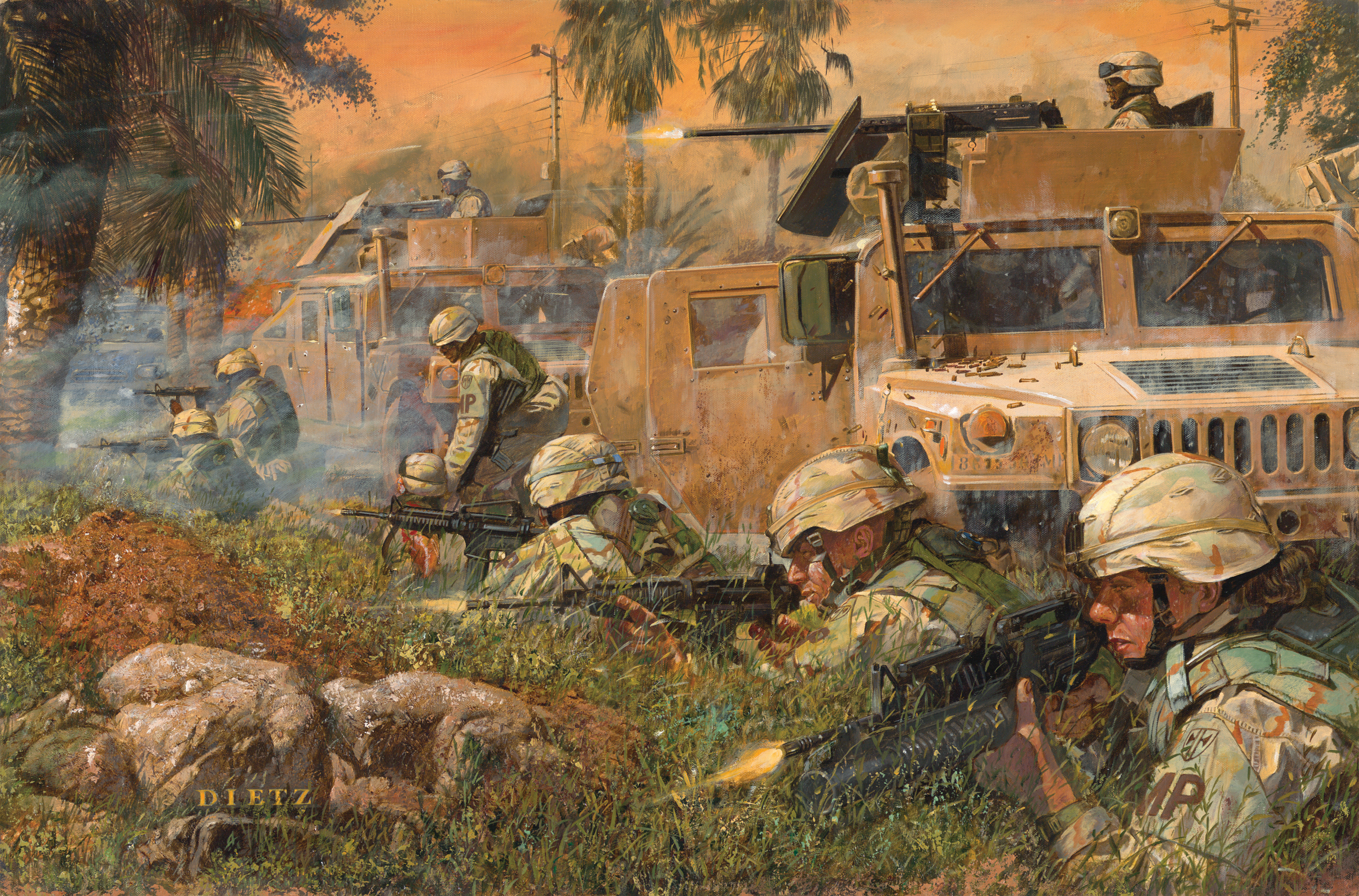
Dietz's Raven 42, depicting a 2005 skirmish in southern Baghdad between Iraqi insurgents and soldiers of the U.S. Army National Guard, notably Leigh Ann Hester.

Dietz's major works include Maximum Effort, a commission for the 449th Bomb Group Association who were veterans of the 15th Air Force, Arctic Convoy, Fall of the Falcon, Last Word, and Yanks Mount Up. His oil painting Bottom of the First, which depicts U.S. soldiers on duty in the Philippines during the Second World War, was the winner of Best in Show in CAE Simuflight's Horizons of Flight Art Exhibition in 2000.

His works are exhibited in different military museum collections. Citizen Soldier and The Crossing, which depicts the 132nd Infantry Regiment at Guadalcanal, are currently on exhibit at the Pritzker Military Museum & Library. An exhibition of his work entitled Wood and Canvas: the WWI Aviation of James Dietz was on display at the Wings Over the Rockies Air and Space Museum through January 2014.

== Influences ==
Dietz's combat art has been influenced by notable combat artists of past periods, including Frederic Remington, Harvey Dunn, Howard Brodie, Kerr Eby, and Thomas C. Lea III. His World War II paintings echo paintings of the American Civil War in their classicality and acceptance of war's brutality. As Dietz phrased it, "I had shot off my mouth about how I could really do a job on World War I flying, so I had to produce something." He believed that the relatively small size of aircraft and their frail structures, would make them ideal for compositions focused on people. These characters had been very prominent in his World War I pieces, that he earned "a reputation as an aviation painter who did not paint airplanes". He made many details right, which included czarist ration boxes and Austrian engine fittings.

== Clients ==
- Boeing, Bell Helicopter, Federal Express, Allison Cessna, Flying Tigers, the Indianapolis 500, BMW, US Air Force Documentary Art Program, Wingnut Studios, Meadowbrook, Pebble Beach Concours d'Elegance, the National Guard.
- U.S. Army organizations and associations: the 82nd Airborne Division, the 101st Airborne Division, U.S. Army Rangers, Special Forces, 1st Division, 2nd Division, 3rd Division, 4th Division, 1st Cavalry Division, 11th Armored Cavalry Regiment, 173rd Airborne Brigade, The Command General Staff College, The United States Army War College.

== Awards ==
- EAA Aviation Art Show from 1989–91. Ranked best in Show
- Named Master Artist at the EAA in 1992
- Best in Show & three Best of Era Awards at the San Antonio Military Art Show, 1992
- Honorable Mention at the American Society of Aviation Artists Show, 1994
- Best in Show at the Flying Magazine/Simuflite Art Show, 1993, 1994, 1999, 2000, 2001
- Award of Merit at the Flying Magazine/Simuflite Art Show, 1995, 2000
- Best in Show at the Naval Aviation Museum Art Show, 1994, 2000
- First Place at the Naval Aviation Museum Art Show, 1995
- People's Choice Award for the American Society of Aviation Artists, 1988
- Best in Show at the Franklin Mint Artists Show, 1992
- R. G. Smith Award for Excellence in Naval Aviation Art, National Naval Aviation Museum, Pensacola, FL, 1997
- Best in Show, Women in Aviation Show, American Airlines C.R. Smith Museum, Dallas, TX, 1997
- Stanley Wanlass Award, for excellence in strength of design and composition, echoing the spirit of the automobile, Meadow Brook Concours d'Elegance, 1997
- Featured Artist, Meadow Brook Concours d'Elegance, 1999
- Award of Excellence, Automotive Fine Artists of America show at Pebble Beach Concours d'Elegance, 1999, 2000
- Peter Helck Award, Automotive Fine Artists of America show at Pebble Beach Concours d'Elegance, 1999, 2000
- League of WWI Aviation Historians, four Silver Cups
