= Sport Chumpions =

1941 film by Isadore Freleng

- Title card
- Directed by: I. Freleng
- Story by: Michael Maltese
- Produced by: Leon Schlesinger
- Music by: Carl W. Stalling
- Animation by: Gerry Chiniquy
- Color process: Technicolor
- Production company: Leon Schlesinger Productions
- Distributed by: Warner Bros. Pictures
- Release date: August 16, 1941
- Running time: 7 min
- Language: English

Sport Chumpions is a 1941 American animated comedy short film directed by Isadore Freleng. The cartoon was released on August 16, 1941. It is part of the Merrie Melodies series. It is the first themed spot gag cartoon in the series to not be directed by Tex Avery, who left the studio during production.

== Plot ==
The film

The film consists of a series of unrelated gags about sports.

An archer shoots four bullseyes in a row, revealing that he did this in close proximity of the target. A billiards player hits the cue balls, which drift perfectly to one of the table's corners. Two ping pong players play a match without any abnormalities, though the audience's eyeballs follow the action in a close-up. A skier is promised to make the highest and most treacherous ski jump, only to jump a single step at the bottom of the slope. In a track competition, the runners literally climb over the hurdles too high to be jumped over.

A women's swimming competition is won by a mermaid. An Olympic medal winning swimmer does four strokes, apparently including him crawling in the water. Divers partake in a diving competition, with a "popular dive" being a bar named Sloppy Joe. ("Eat at Joe's" is a running gag amongst the studio's animators.) In crew racing, rowers row a canoe to the beat of the music, while a rower with a single paddle rows twice as fast.

A bicycle race happens with no abnormalities until the racers acknowledge the monotonous nature of the race. In a baseball competition, a talkative player fails to catch the pitch, a gag reused by Freleng in Baseball Bugs (1946). In a football competition, players wrangle the ball and the referee, who is uncertain if a touchdown is scored. The narrator struggles to show the team's formation and movement. In an auto race, the winner is interviewed while time is stopped and his car is operating. He responds by imitating a car's sounds.
