= David Uhl =

American painter

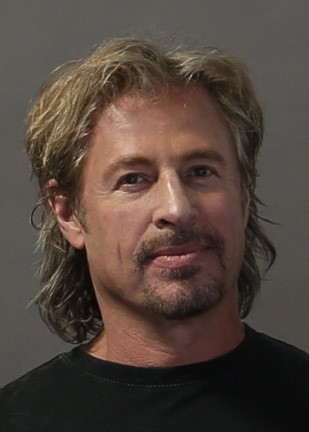
- Born: September 20, 1961 (age 64); Toledo, Ohio
- Movement: American Romantic Realism
- Spouse: Elizabeth Uhl
- Patrons: Harley-Davidson
- Website: https://www.uhlstudios.com/

David Uhl is an American artist who specializes in oil paintings of vintage Harley-Davidson motorcycles and is known for his Women of Harley-Davidson collection.

== Career ==
David Uhl was born in Toledo, Ohio, on September 20, 1961, and was raised in Luna Pier, Michigan, where he was one of seven children. He attended high school at St. John's Jesuit High School and Academy in Toledo. When Uhl was in high school, he planned to become a marine biologist. During classes, he had a habit of creating images with his ballpoint pen while taking notes. Eventually, he started selling his pictures to his classmates. In 1979, Uhl applied for and received the only full-ride scholarship offered to a high school senior in the United States at the Colorado Institute of Art (CIA). Uhl left the institute before completing his studies and became a freelance illustrator. His clients included Coca-Cola, Apple, IBM, Federal Express, and Time magazine. He and Danial James Stuckenschneider founded Uhl Studios LLC in 1989.

Uhl's artistic focus started to shift after he purchased his first motorcycle in 1988 and was exposed to the culture of motorcycle enthusiasts during a ride to the Sturgis Motorcycle Rally in South Dakota. While attending a dealer meeting in Boston, Uhl presented Harley officials with an image of the Harley Motors symbol superimposed on Mount Rushmore. As a result, Uhl landed an account creating images for Harley T-shirts in 1993. He became Harley-Davidson's first licensed oil painter in 1998.

Uhl has become known for using black and white photos from the Harley-Davidson photo archive to create painted images of the company's motorcycles with accurate colors and mechanical details.

In 2013, he was commissioned by both Harley-Davidson and the Vatican to create paintings commemorating Harley-Davidson's 110th anniversary celebration in Rome. Uhl presented the piece Chance Encounter to Pope Francis and the Vatican during a private meeting. The painting depicts a group of clergy noticing a 1948 Harley-Davidson FL panhead while walking in St. Peter's Square and is now part of the Vatican's art collection. The image is also sold as a commemorative postcard with a Pope Francis stamp. The Vatican Post Office designed a mark for the postcard based on Uhl's painting.

By 2013, Uhl had painted between 400 and 500 images depicting Harley-Davidson motorcycles. He has been described as the "Norman Rockwell of Harley-Davidson artists" by Charles Osgood of CBS Sunday Morning.

Collectors of Uhl's work include Aerosmith lead singer Steven Tyler and former Tonight Show host Jay Leno. In 2013, Uhl created a painting of Tyler riding through a crowd of paparazzi on a motorcycle. The Reckoning was made available as a limited-edition print to benefit DonorsChoose, an online charity that connects the requests of teachers in high-need communities with donors who want to help.

Uhl has also created archival paintings for Shelby American and has done work on the history of winemaking in Napa Valley, California. He was selected in 2011 to design the program cover for the 100th running of the Indy 500 on May 29, 2011. His painting was inspired by a 1911 photo of the car race.

== Exhibits and collections ==
=== Collections ===
==== Women of Harley-Davidson Collection ====
Uhl launched his 'Women of Harley-Davidson' collection in 1998. The paintings depict women riders. He adds a new painting to this collection every two years. His 2024 addition was 'Gevin', inspired by Gevin Fax, who is passionate ahout biking and has supported the community of women riders for decades.

This collection also features:

- 'Gloria' Gloria Tramontin Struck, who started riding at the age of 16, later joined the Motor Maids in 1946. She has logged over 500,000 miles and was inducted into the Sturgis Hall of Fame in 2011.
- 'Jessi' Jessi Combs holds the land-speed record on four wheels. The composition was inspired by the WAVES of WWII, women who served in the US Navy.

==== Daytona Beach Bike Week Commemoratives ====
In 2005, David Uhl created 'Censored 1933', the first in this series. Since then, he has offered one or two commemoratives each year.

==== Sturgis Rally Commemoratives ====
Source:

==== Harley-Davidson Anniversary Commemoratives ====
This collection started in 2003 with 'The Witness' for the 100th anniversary. The latest editions of this series were 'Triple Play' and 'Tale of Two Worlds' in 2023, for the 120th celebration.

Other popular pieces in the collection:

- 'The Enthusiast' 100th Anniversary Harley-Davidson Art
- 'The Watercolors' 115th Anniversary Harley-Davidson Art features Willie G. Davidson, former senior vice-president and chief styling officer of Harley-Davidson Motorcycle Company.
- 'Eternity' 115th Anniversary Harley-Davidson Art with Karen Davidson in Prague at the famous astronomical clock.

==== Aviation and Military ====
David Uhl's artwork spans the realm of aviation and life during periods of war. His compositions tell stories from the inspired times of early aviation, through the lifestyle of brave pilots, to the importance of how motorcycles and planes helped write the course of history. The collection started with 'Innovation' in 2001, depicting the Wright brothers in a demonstration of their military flier. The latest aviation addition was 'Inspiration' in 2023, an EEA AirVenture Oshkosh commemorative piece with Amelia Earhart and Ava, the young dreamer in the spotlight.

Some popular pieces of the collection are:

- 'Strategic Maneuvers' warbird nose-art, pin-up genre.
- 'Salute' featuring P-51 Mustangs from the 334th Fighter Squadron, during WWII.
- 'Eternal Radiance' featuring Jessi Combs

==== Art of the Spirits ====
In 2013, in collaboration with Art of the Spirits, 'Final Run' was released as the first in a series of various artwork and small batch bourbon packages. Since then, 3 other packages joined the collection: 'The Originals' (2020) tributing the Special Forces, 'Frogman' (2022) for the Navy Seals and 'Airmen' (2023) tributing the Airforce.

=== Exhibits ===
David Uhl Studios in Golden, Colorado

The Wheels Through Time Museum in Maggie Valley, North Carolina;

Doubletake Gallery in Burnsville, Minnesota.

=== His work has been in exhibits at the ===
Marietta/Cobb Museum in Marietta, Georgia;

Shelby American Museum in Boulder, Colorado;

Antique Automobile Club of America Museum in Hershey, Pennsylvania;

Indianapolis Motor Speedway Museum in Indianapolis, Indiana;

Harley-Davidson Museum in Milwaukee, Wisconsin;

Rocky Mountain Motorcycle Museum in Colorado Springs, Colorado;

National WASP Museum, Sweetwater, Texas;

Legends Vintage Motorcycle Museum, Springville, Utah;

National Motorcycle Museum, Anamosa, Iowa;

Sturgis Motorcycle Museum, Sturgis, South Dakota;

Chandler Vintage Museum of Transportation and Wildlife, Oxnard, California;

and American Motorcycle Association Hall of Fame Museum, Pickerington, Ohio.

== Personal life ==
Uhl lives and works in Golden, Colorado, and is married to Elizabeth Uhl. They have two children.
