= Stephanie Freid-Perenchio =

American documentary photographer

Stephanie Freid-Perenchio is an independent documentary photographer known for her work highlighting humanitarian causes and wartime. She is best known for her documentary work on the Navy SEALs, both in her publication SEAL: The Unspoken Sacrifice and subsequent work. Her work has been exhibited at the Pritzker Military Museum & Library and the Sun Valley Center for the Arts.

== Work ==
Perenchio, along with colleague Jennifer Walton, coauthored SEAL: The Unspoken Sacrifice in 2009. The book accounts and shows photographs of Navy SEALs operations during their training and service. Specifically, over the course of eight years, Perenchio and Walton documented training for recruits in Alaska and California, and also spent several months working with the SEALs in Afghanistan. Perenchio's work on Navy SEALs has been featured in Foreign Policy, the Chicago Tribune, and the Pritzker Military Museum & Library.

Perenchio has noted that her motivation to document the service of Navy SEALs was based on a conversation she had at a dinner party with Vice Admiral Robert S. Harward. After discussing his service, she has asked frankly out of interest, "How do you kill someone in the morning and then go home and play with your wife and children?" The two continued to stay in touch and after the September 11 attacks, Perenchio contacted Harward about the project, where he allowed her and Walton access. The project was originally called "A Day in the Life of a SEAL."

She has also done documentary work examining endangered animals on the African continent, and evaluating the impact of wartime on women and children living in Afghanistan.

Locally, Perenchio is also co-chair of the Family of Women Film Festival in Sun Valley, Idaho.

== Studio ==
Perenchio in based in her own Stephanie Freid-Perenchio (SFP) Studio in Ketchum, Idaho.
