= Rick Atkinson =

American author (born 1952)

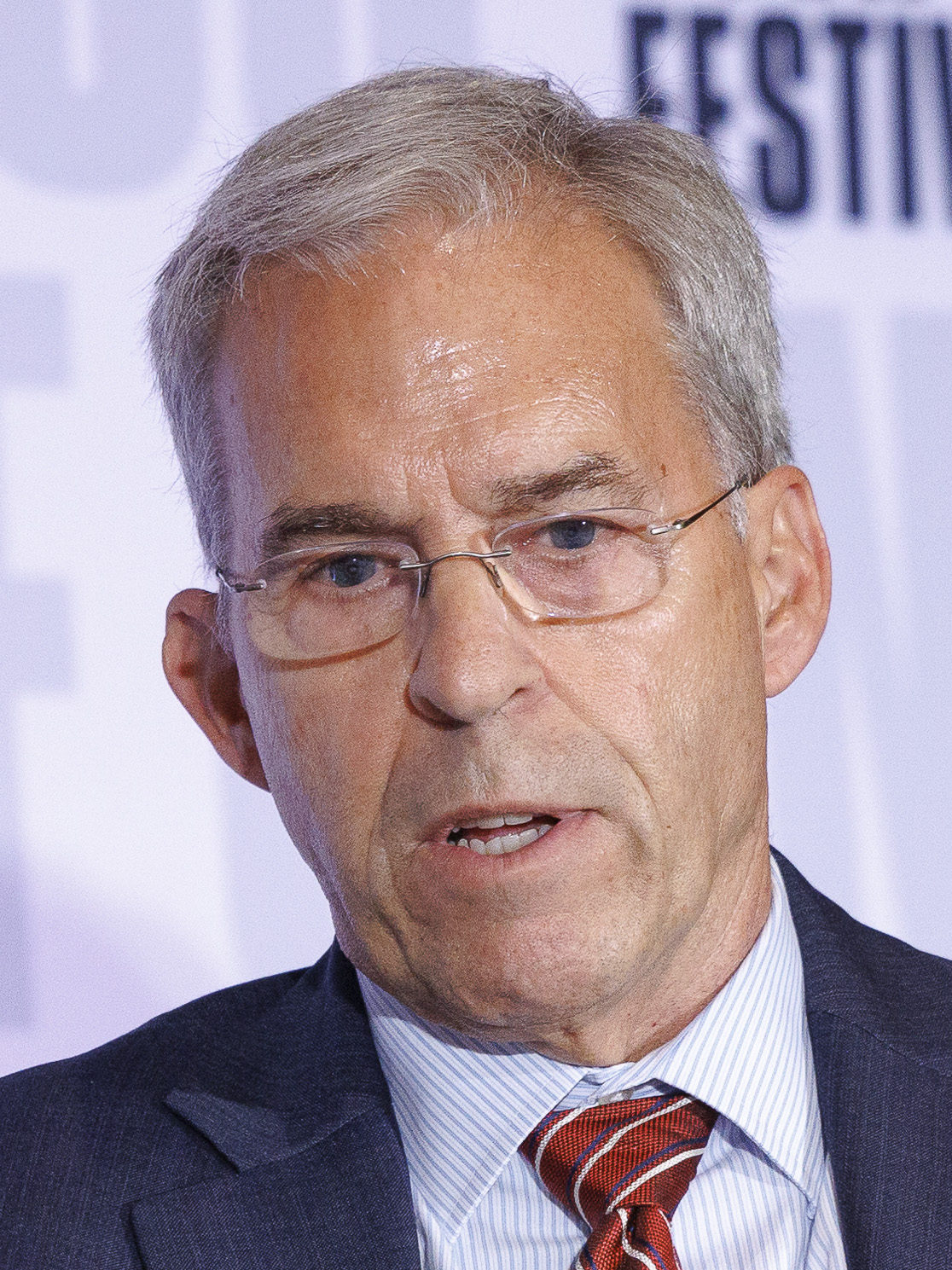
- Atkinson in 2025
- Born: Lawrence Rush Atkinson IV; November 15, 1952 (age 73); Munich, West Germany
- Education: East Carolina University (B.A.); University of Chicago (M.A.)
- Occupations: Journalist; editor; historian; author
- Agent: Raphael Sagalyn
- Spouse: Jane Ann Chestnut (m. 1979)
- Children: 2

Lawrence Rush "Rick" Atkinson IV (born November 15, 1952) is an American author and journalist.

After working as a newspaper reporter, editor, and foreign correspondent for The Washington Post, Atkinson turned to writing military history. His eight books include narrative accounts of five different American wars. He has won Pulitzer Prizes in history and journalism.

His Liberation Trilogy, a history of the American role in the liberation of Europe in World War II, concluded with the publication of The Guns at Last Light in May 2013. In 2010, he received the $100,000 Pritzker Military Library Literature Award for Lifetime Achievement in Military Writing.

== Life and career ==
Atkinson was born in Munich to Margaret (née Howe) and Larry Atkinson, who was a U.S. Army officer. Turning down an appointment to West Point, he instead attended East Carolina University on a full scholarship, graduating with a bachelor of arts degree in English in 1974. He received a master of arts degree in English language and literature from the University of Chicago in 1975.

While visiting his parents for Christmas at Fort Riley, Kansas, in 1975, Atkinson found a job as a newspaper reporter for The Morning Sun in Pittsburg, Kansas, covering crime, local government, and other topics in southeast Kansas, an area known as "the Little Balkans" for its ethnic diversity and fractious politics. In April 1977, he joined the staff of The Kansas City Times, working nights in suburban Johnson County, Kansas before moving to the city desk and eventually serving as a national reporter.

In 1981, he joined the newspaper's bureau in Washington, D.C. He won the Pulitzer Prize for national reporting in 1982 for a "body of work" that included a series about the West Point class of 1966, which lost more men in Vietnam than any other Military Academy class. He also contributed to the newspaper's coverage of the Hyatt Regency walkway collapse in Kansas City, Missouri, for which the paper's staff in 1982 was awarded a Pulitzer Prize for local spot news reporting.

In November 1983, Atkinson was hired as a reporter on the national staff of The Washington Post. He wrote about defense issues, the 1984 presidential election. He covered Rep. Geraldine Ferraro, the first woman vice-presidential candidate for a major party, and national topics. In 1985, he became deputy national editor, overseeing coverage of defense, diplomacy, and intelligence. In 1988, he returned to reporting as a member of the Post investigative staff, writing about public housing in the District of Columbia and the secret history of Project Senior C.J., which became the B-2 stealth bomber.

In 1991, he was the newspaper's lead writer during the Persian Gulf War. In 1993, he joined the foreign staff as bureau chief in Berlin, covering Germany and NATO and spending time in Somalia and Bosnia. He returned from Europe in 1996 to become assistant managing editor for investigations; in that role, he headed a seven-member team that for more than a year scrutinized shootings by the District of Columbia police department, resulting in "Deadly Force," a series for which the Post was awarded the Pulitzer Prize for Public Service.

In 1999, Atkinson left the newspaper world to write about World War II, an interest that began with his birth in Germany and was rekindled during his three-year tour in Berlin. He twice rejoined the Post, first in 2003 when for two months he accompanied General David Petraeus and the 101st Airborne Division during the invasion of Iraq, and again in 2007 when he made trips to Iraq and Afghanistan while writing "Left of Boom", an investigative series about roadside bombs in modern warfare, which won the Gerald R. Ford Award for Distinguished Reporting on National Defense. He held the Omar N. Bradley Chair of Strategic Leadership at the United States Army War College and Dickinson College in 2004–2005, and remains an adjunct faculty member at the war college.

Atkinson is a presidential counselor at the National World War II Museum in New Orleans, a member of the Society of American Historians, and an inductee in the American Academy of Achievement, for which he also serves as a board member. He formerly served on the governing commission of the National Portrait Gallery. Atkinson is married and has two children.

== Works ==
Atkinson's first book, written while on leave from the Post, was The Long Gray Line: The American Journey of West Point's Class of 1966. A 1989 review in Time magazine called it "brilliant history", and Business Week reviewer Dave Griffiths called it "the best book out of Vietnam to date". Author James Salter, reviewing the book for The Washington Post Book World, wrote, "Enormously rich in detail and written with a novelist's brilliance, the pages literally hurry before one."

In 1993, Atkinson wrote Crusade: The Untold Story of the Persian Gulf War. In a review, The Wall Street Journal wrote, "No one could have been better prepared to write a book on Desert Storm, and Atkinson's Crusade does full justice to the opportunity."

In 2002, Atkinson's publication of The Liberation Trilogy began with An Army at Dawn: The War in North Africa, 1942–1943, acclaimed by The Wall Street Journal as "the best World War II battle narrative since Cornelius Ryan's classics, The Longest Day and A Bridge Too Far." While with the 101st Airborne Division south of Baghdad in April 2003, Atkinson learned that the book had been awarded the Pulitzer Prize for history. The trilogy's second volume, The Day of Battle: The War in Sicily and Italy, 1943–1944, published in 2007, drew praise from The New York Times as "a triumph of narrative history, elegantly written ... and rooted in the sights and sounds of battle."

In May 2013, volume three, The Guns at Last Light: The War in Western Europe, 1944–1945, was published by Henry Holt and Co., and was ranked #1 on the New York Times Hardcover Nonfiction and Combined Print & E-Book Nonfiction bestseller lists. A review in The New York Times called the book "a tapestry of fabulous richness and complexity...Atkinson is a master of what might be called 'pointillism history,' assembling the small dots of pure color into a vivid, tumbling narrative ... The Liberation Trilogy is a monumental achievement."

As a result of his time with Gen. Petraeus and the 101st Airborne, Atkinson wrote In the Company of Soldiers: A Chronicle of Combat, which The New York Times Book Review called "intimate, vivid, and well-informed", and which Newsweek cited as one of the ten best books of 2004. Atkinson was the lead essayist in Where Valor Rests: Arlington National Cemetery, published by the National Geographic Society in 2007. He is the editor and introductory essayist for an anthology of work by the journalist and military historian Cornelius Ryan published by Library of America in May 2019.

In May 2019, the first book in the Revolution Trilogy, The British Are Coming: The War for America, Lexington to Princeton, 1775–1777, was published by Henry Holt and edited, as all of Atkinson's books have been, by John Sterling. The New York Times selected The British Are Coming for its 100 Notable Books of 2019. It won the 2020 George Washington Book Prize. Reviewer Joseph J. Ellis, writing on the front page of the New York Times Book Review, wrote, "To say that Atkinson can tell a story is like saying Sinatra can sing."

The second volume of the Revolution Trilogy, The Fate of the Day: The War for America, Ticonderoga to Charleston, 1777-1780, was published in April 2025, and debuted at number one on the New York Times nonfiction bestseller list. A review in the New York Times Book Review by Amy S. Greenberg, head of the history department at Penn State University, stated, "There is no better writer of narrative history than the Pulitzer Prize-winning Atkinson, who is able to transport readers to a different time and place without minimizing the differences of the past from the present." Reviewer C.W. Goodyear wrote in the Washington Post, "Atkinson writes with tremendous verve and detail. The result is a book that infuses the events and leaders of the war with striking vibrancy, essentially bringing the conflict to life again." Atkinson also appears repeatedly in the 2025 Ken Burns' documentary, The American Revolution. Burns has written that "Rick Atkinson takes his place among the greatest of all historians."

In 2019, Atkinson was named a Vincent J. Dooley Distinguished Fellow by the Georgia Historical Society, an honor that recognizes national leaders in the field of history as both writers and educators whose research has enhanced or changed the way the public understands the past.

== Awards and honors ==
- 1982 Pulitzer Prize, National Reporting
- 1983 Livingston Award for Young Journalists
- 1989 George Polk Award for National Reporting
- 1999 Pulitzer Prize for public service, awarded to The Post for articles on shootings by the District of Columbia police department
- 2003 Pulitzer Prize in History, An Army at Dawn
- 2003 Society for Military History Distinguished Book Award
- 2008 Golden Plate Award of the American Academy of Achievement
- 2009 Axel Springer Prize and fellowship, the American Academy, Berlin
- 2010 Pritzker Military Library Literature Award for Lifetime Achievement in Military Writing
- 2014 Samuel Eliot Morison Prize for lifetime achievement, Society for Military History
- 2015 Peggy V. Helmerich Distinguished Author Award
- 2019 Vincent J. Dooley Distinguished Teaching Fellow, awarded by the Georgia Historical Society
- 2020 George Washington Book Prize The British Are Coming, for the year's best work on the American founding era
- 2020 New-York Historical Society Barbara and David Zalaznick Prize in American History, The British Are Coming, for the year's best work in American history or biography

== Bibliography ==
=== Books ===
- The Long Gray Line: The American Journey of West Point's Class of 1966. Boston: Houghton Mifflin. 1989. ISBN 0395480086.
- Crusade: The Untold Story of the Persian Gulf War. Boston: Houghton Mifflin. 1993. ISBN 0395710839.
- An Army at Dawn: The War in North Africa, 1942–1943. New York: Henry Holt. 2002. ISBN 0805062882. (The Liberation Trilogy Vol. 1) (2003 Pulitzer Prize for History)
- In the Company of Soldiers: A Chronicle of Combat. New York: Henry Holt. 2004. ISBN 0805075615.
- The Day of Battle: The War in Sicily and Italy, 1943–1944. New York: Henry Holt. 2007. ISBN 9780805062892. (The Liberation Trilogy Vol. 2)
- "Where Valor Rests: Arlington National Cemetery". National Geographic. Washington, D.C. 2007.
- The Guns at Last Light: The War in Western Europe, 1944–1945. New York: Henry Holt. 2013. ISBN 9780805062908. (The Liberation Trilogy Vol. 3)
- The British Are Coming: The War for America, Lexington to Princeton, 1775–1777. Henry Holt and Co. 2019. ISBN 9781627790437. (The Revolution Trilogy Vol. 1)
- The Fate of the Day: The War for America, Fort Ticonderoga to Charleston, 1777–1780. Crown. ISBN 9780593799185. (The Revolution Trilogy Vol. 2, Apr. 29, 2025)

=== Young Readers Adaptations ===
- D-Day: The Invasion of Normandy, 1944. New York: Henry Holt. 2014. ISBN 9781627791113. (The Young Readers Adaptation of The Guns of Last Light)
- Battle of the Bulge. New York: Henry Holt. 2015. ISBN 9781627791137. (The Young Readers Adaptation of The Guns at Last Light)
- The British Are Coming (Young Readers Edition). New York: Henry Holt Books for Young Readers. 2022. ISBN 9781250800589.
