= E. Frederic Morrow =

American businessman and politician (1909–1994)

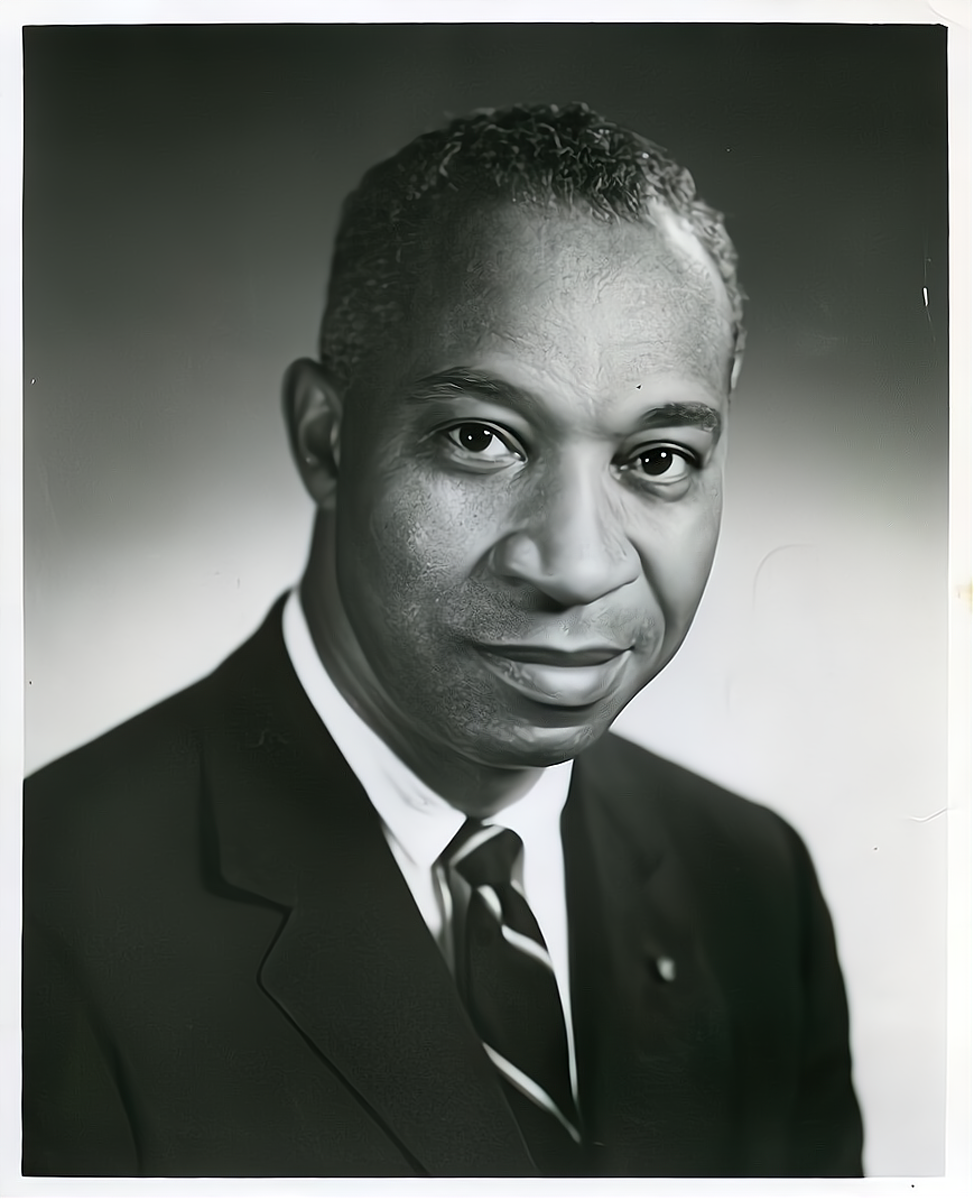

Administrative Officer for Special Projects
- In office July 11, 1955 – January 20, 1961
- President: Dwight D. Eisenhower
- Preceded by: Position established
- Succeeded by: None

Personal details
- Born: April 20, 1909 Hackensack, New Jersey, U.S.
- Died: July 19, 1994 (aged 85) New York City, New York, U.S.
- Party: Republican
- Spouse: Catherine Louise Gordon (m. 1957)
- Relations: John H. Morrow (brother)
- Education: Bowdoin College; Rutgers University

Military service
- Allegiance: United States
- Branch/service: United States Army
- Years of service: 1942–1946
- Rank: Major

Everett Frederic Morrow (April 20, 1909 – July 19, 1994) was the first African American to hold an executive position at the White House. He served President Dwight Eisenhower as Administrative Officer for Special Projects from 1955 to 1961.

== Early life ==
Morrow was born in Hackensack, New Jersey. Morrow's father was John Eugene Morrow, a library custodian, who became an ordained Methodist minister in 1912, and his mother was Mary Ann Hayes, a former farm worker and maid. His grandparents had been enslaved.

He graduated from Hackensack High School in 1925, where he participated for three years on the school's debate team, serving as its president during his senior year. He was a member of Alpha Phi Alpha fraternity.

His brother, John H. Morrow, was Ambassador to Guinea and American representative to UNESCO.

== Education ==
A graduate of the law school of Rutgers University, he attended Bowdoin College from 1926 to 1930, where he was one of two African American students in attendance. Morrow had to return home before graduating to assist his family. (Bowdoin awarded him an honorary LL.D. degree in 1970.)

== Early career ==
In 1935, Morrow held a position as a business manager for Opportunity Magazine, a part of the National Urban League. Two years later, he became a field secretary for the NAACP, before joining the United States Army during World War II. In 1942, after only a month of serving in the US army as a private, he was promoted to sergeant. He soon after graduated from Officers Candidate School, and was discharged in 1946 as a Major of Artillery. Later, he was a writer for CBS.

== Political activity and White House period ==
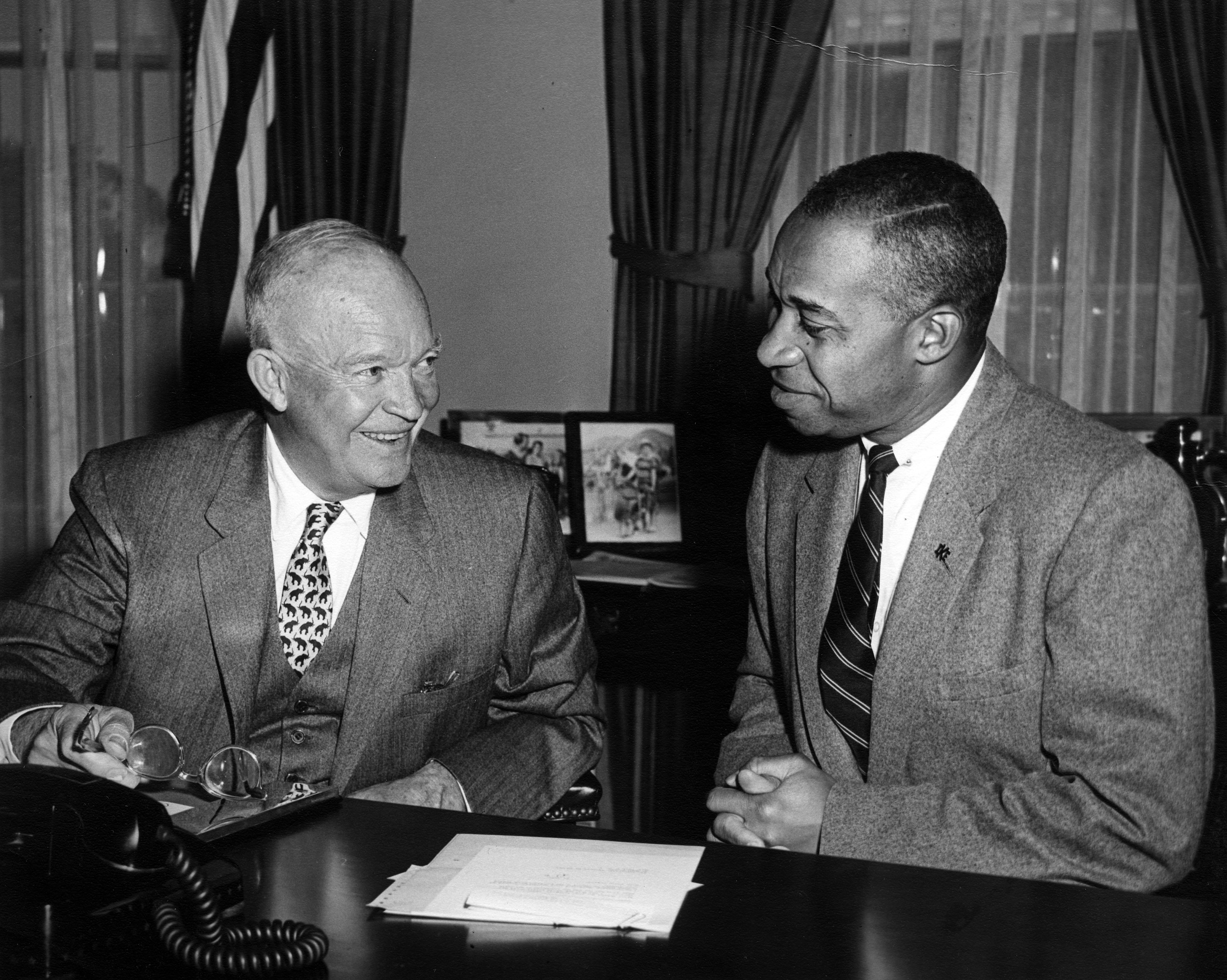
Morrow with President Dwight D. Eisenhower in 1956

After serving on Eisenhower's 1952 campaign staff, Morrow served as an adviser at the U.S. Commerce Department. He then moved to the White House as Administrative Officer for Special Projects, becoming the first African American to hold an executive position in the White House.

The White House Historical Association wrote of his tenure:

As the sole African American on a staff dealing with racial tensions related to integration, Morrow faced difficult personal and professional struggles at the White House. The Supreme Court's landmark Brown v. Board of Education ruling, the Montgomery bus boycott, and the Little Rock crisis were the backdrop for Morrow's White House years. On a staff with a civil-rights policy that was at best cautious, Morrow was often frustrated and angered. He lived at a time when qualified African Americans were excluded from high-level political positions. Morrow as a black 'first' found relations within the president's 'official family' to be 'correct in conduct, but cold.'

Morrow campaigned for Richard Nixon in Nixon's unsuccessful 1960 presidential campaign, including a prime-time speech at the Republican National Convention and a role in the Vice-Presidential selection caucus.

== Post-White House life ==
In 1964, Morrow became the first African American vice-president of Bank of America, retiring from the company in 1975. He died on July 19, 1994, at the Mount Sinai Hospital in Manhattan.

== Books and papers ==
After the 1960 campaign, Morrow wrote a book on his experiences, Black Man in the White House. In it, Morrow said:

I have discovered certain peculiarities in the White House top staff. There is little sentiment at anyone's downfall. There may be outward expressions of sympathy, but each man is primarily concerned with his own survival, and there's always the possibility that another's misfortune will ease the pressure on him.

In Morrow's book, he speaks of many accounts where he suffered from racism on personal and professional levels. He also refers to multiple occasions when he was mistaken for a coat boy or taxi driver while working.

In 1973, Morrow published his first autobiography, Way Down South Up North, focusing on racism "up north", in his hometown of Hackensack, New Jersey. In 1980, after retiring from Bank of America, Morrow published his last autobiography, Forty Years a Guinea Pig: A Black Man's View from the Top.

Some of his papers are at the Eisenhower Presidential Library, the Chicago Public Library's Vivian G. Harsh Research Collection of Afro-American History and Literature, and the Amistad Research Center in New Orleans, LA.
