= Pritzker Military Museum & Library =

Chicago museum and research library

- 42°38′24.63128″N 87°56′8.05031″W
- Location: 10475 12th Street, Kenosha, WI 53144, United States
- Type: Non-profit
- Scope: Military history, military science
- Established: 2003

Collection
- Size: 67,000 volumes, plus other material

Other information
- Budget: US$4,762,922 (2017)
- Employees: 22
- Website: www.pritzkermilitary.org

The Pritzker Military Museum & Library (formerly Pritzker Military Library) is a non-profit museum and research library for the study of military history located in a state-of-the art facility in Kenosha, WI. The institution was founded in 2003, and its specialist collections include material relating to Winston Churchill and war-related sheet music.

== History ==
The institution was founded in 2003 as the Pritzker Military Library to be a non-partisan institution for the study of "the citizen soldier as an essential element for the preservation of democracy" by Jennifer Pritzker, who had just retired from the Illinois Army National Guard. Originally located in the Streeterville neighborhood at 610 N. Fairbanks Court, the library later moved to 104 S. Michigan Avenue in the Loop. The museum & library is a non-profit, supported by donations and membership.

In early 2019, Rob Havers was appointed president and CEO of the museum. In 2022, he was succeeded by Krewasky A. Salter.

== Collections ==
The collection of the Pritzker Military Museum & Library comprises over 115,000 items and includes more than 70,000 books, as well as periodicals, videos, artwork, posters, rare military ephemera, over 9000 photographs and glass negatives from the American Civil War and the Spanish–American War to the present, letters and journals from American soldiers, and a sizable collection related to Winston Churchill. Sam Gevirtz, who served on board USS Bunker Hill during the Okinawa invasion, donated his two World War II diaries to the Museum & Library.

The Library participates in an interlibrary loan program with major public and university libraries in the continental United States. Membership is required to borrow circulating materials.

The library has a non-circulating collection of more than 3,000 rare books and periodicals, including the Famiano Strada's De Bello Belgico (London: 1650) and John Entick's The General History of the Late War: Containing It's Rise, Progress, and Event, in Europe, Asia, Africa, and America (London: 1763). The collection also includes unit histories, such as Civil War regimentals, and cruise books, like those from USS Chicago. These materials must be read in the Rare Book Reading Room.

The institution maintains named collections, which include the Parrish Collection on Soviet History, the Dr. Charles E. Metz Collection (titles on World War II aviation), James Wengert Military Medical Collection, Lt. Col. Robert C. Peithman Collection (titles on the United States Marine Corps), Henry J. Reilly Memorial Library (volumes collected by Brig. Gen. Reilly), the Robert C. Baldridge Collection (volumes collected by Robert Connell Baldridge), Edward Jablonski Collection (books of historian Edward Jablonski), John V. Farwell Collection (books on the American and British navies), Robert G. Burkhardt Memorial Collection (books on submarines and leadership), Dr. Charles C. Moskos Collection (books on military sociology, LGBTQ and the military, women and the military), Norman E. Harms Collection (books and papers on aviation, tanks, and ships), Robin D. S. Higham Collection (books on aviation, the Civil War, World War I, and World War II unit histories), and World War I and World War II Sheet Music and Song Books Collection.

== Programs ==
The Museum & Library has produced multiple programs related to military history in the United States.

=== Pritzker Military Presents ===
Pritzker Military Presents was a televised series covering various topics in military history, and features film screenings, author presentations, and panel discussions with military officers and specialists in military history. They have included interviews with Medal of Honor recipients such as Paul William Bucha and Gary L. Littrell, retired military figures such as Gen. Anthony Zinni and NASA Capt. Jim Lovell, as well as military authors such as Doris Kearns Goodwin, Rick Atkinson, and W.E.B. Griffin. Retired CIA agent Sandra Grimes also paid a visit to the Museum & Library and introduced her book Circle of Treason. Programs are webcast live on the library's website and archived for later viewing or listening in streaming media or as podcasts. This website has over 400 of these programs available as episodes of Pritzker Military Presents, or original programming produced by the Museum & Library. The programs are downloaded at a rate of 2,000 per month per program. They were also broadcast on Chicago PBS affiliate WTTW Channel 11.

=== Citizen Soldier ===
The Museum & Library also produced Citizen Soldier. Each episode is originally a panel, conversation or interview that take place at Pritzker Military Museum & Library. It is then edited into a 26-minute episode that was broadcast on Chicago Public TV station, WTTW Channel 11 and WTTW-Prime Channel 11–2. All episodes can be viewed on the Museum & Library's website.

=== Other programs ===
The Holt Oral History Program has collected stories from over 71 US military veterans and posted a downloadable podcast. The full audio interviews and transcriptions are available on the Museum & Library's website. Kenneth Clarke, president and CEO of the library at the time, said one of the Library's goals is to provide a secure space for veterans to explore their experiences in war.

The Museum & Library also serves as a community resource, hosting commissioning and citizenship ceremonies.

== Exhibitions ==
Pritzker Military Museum & Library seal, commissioned from James Dietz

The Museum & Library has also hosted exhibitions by artists such as Steve Mumford, James Dietz, Don Stivers, and members of the Midwest Air Force Association. Other exhibitions have included Don't Be a Dope!: Training Comics from World War II and Korea and She's a Wow!: Women's Service Organizations in World War II. In May 2014, the Pritzker exhibited photography from Stephanie Freid-Perenchio: her work depicted Navy SEALs in training and during their service in Afghanistan; the exhibit also included independently loaned artifacts from the Navy SEAL Museum such as uniforms and equipment. In June 2019, the Museum & Library opened the D-Day+75 exhibition, to mark the 75th anniversary of D-Day. The exhibit featured images, letters and maps from the invasion in Normandy in addition to video and audio recording from D-Day veterans. In 2023, the Tet and the Battle of Hue exhibit debuted. The exhibit presented media that allowed visitors to experience the stories of the men who served in the conflict.

== Awards program ==
In 2007, the Museum & Library awarded its first annual Pritzker Literature Award for Lifetime Achievement in Military Writing to Civil War historian James M. McPherson. The award includes a $100,000 honorarium.

=== Honorees ===
- 2007: James M. McPherson
- 2008: Allan R. Millett
- 2009: Gerhard Weinberg
- 2010: Rick Atkinson
- 2011: Carlo D'Este
- 2012: Sir Max Hastings
- 2013: Tim O'Brien
- 2014: Antony Beevor
- 2015: David Hackett Fischer
- 2016: Hew Strachan
- 2017: Peter Paret
- 2018: Dennis Showalter
- 2019: John H. Morrow Jr.
- 2020: David Glantz
- 2021: Margaret MacMillan
- 2023: Dr. Craig L. Symonds

== Critical reception ==
The Pritzker Military Museum & Library was named one of 10 recipients of the 2009 National Medal for Museum and Library Service. The annual award, made by the Institute of Museum and Library Services (IMLS) since 1994, recognizes institutions for outstanding social, educational, environmental, or economic contributions to their communities.

The Museum & Library's 2006 schedule was named an Official Honoree of the 2007 Webby Awards. It was also named an Official Honoree in two categories, Live & Broadcast Events and Podcasts, in the 2008 Webby Awards.

== Publications ==
The museum publishes books, including:

- Lynch, Allen J. (2019). Zero to Hero: From Bullied Kid to Warrior. Pritzker Military Museum & Library. ISBN 978-0998968926.
- Robbins, Michael W. (2018). Lest We Forget: The Great War – World War I Prints from the Pritzker Military Museum and Library. Pritzker Military Museum & Library. ISBN 978-0998968902.

== See also ==
- C. C. Beall – some works in collection
- Bill Mauldin – many of his works in collection
