= Panzer Battles (book) =

1956 memoir by Friedrich von Mellenthin

- Author: Friedrich von Mellenthin
- Original title: Panzerschlachten
- Language: German, English
- Genre: Memoirs
- Publisher: University of Oklahoma Press
- Publication date: 1956 (U.S. edition)
- Media type: Print

Panzer Battles (German: Panzerschlachten) is the English language title of Friedrich von Mellenthin's memoirs of his service as a staff officer in the Panzerwaffe of the German Army during World War II.

The first English edition, as Panzer Battles: A Study of the Employment of Armor in the Second World War, was published in 1956 by the University of Oklahoma Press. Panzer Battles was reprinted six times in the U.S. between 1956 and 1976. Panzer Battles was one of several books by Wehrmacht generals that influence post-war thinking in the West about Russian capabilities.

== Content ==
The book covers Mellenthin's personal recollections and operational information on the major operations in which he participated, across major theaters of the war, with substantial coverage of his time as Erwin Rommel's intelligence officer in the Afrika Corps and his time as the Chief of Staff for XXXXVIII Panzer Corps in Russia.

== Reception ==
Since its release in English in 1956 Panzer Battles has been widely read professionally and academically. The book was a staple on professional military reading lists in NATO member states and was widely cited in academia for decades.

=== Professional ===
Panzer Battles has been extensively cited in military reading lists and professional studies since its release. David T. Zabecki called it a seminal and comprehensive work on mechanized combined arms warfare and said its lessons and principles were of immeasurable value to the post-Vietnam American military. Major Timothy Wray, writing for the U.S. Combat Studies Institute, wrote in 1986 that Panzer Battles was among a series of post-war memoirs that filled an early vacuum of good English language studies of the Eastern Front, causing an undue influence in the Western understanding of that conflict. Wray says Panzer Battles omits important data and context. In 1997, the official United States Marine Corps review of books for its professional military reading list, assembled by Paul Van Riper for the Marine Corps Combat Development Command, lauded it as "a virtual Bible" on armored warfare, with special praise given to the "Psychology of the Russian Soldier" section and the book's maps, which it says offers more tactical and operational clarity than nearly any other military work.

American general Norman Schwarzkopf kept a copy with him during the Gulf War.

=== Academic ===
Soon after its release, Dartmouth history professor Henry L. Roberts, in a one-sentence "capsule review" in Foreign Affairs, called it an "excellent account", offering "interesting observations".

Sovietologist Colonel John Jessup considers the book a good representation of perspective from the "younger generation" of German officers. Military historian David Glantz called it an "operational/tactical account of considerable merit", which showed the negative impact of Hitler's interference in the military operations. He echoed the professional assessment of Col. Wray, pointing out that it was written without the benefit of either German or Soviet records and suffered from incomplete or incorrect interpretations of Soviet forces, dispositions and intentions. Paleoconservative military theorist William S. Lind considered it excellent and full of valuable lessons, including it in his Maneuver Warfare Handbook basic reading list for students of armored warfare.

However, some historians and academics have taken issue with the political and historical context of the book. Wolfram Wette listed Mellenthin among German generals he considered to have authored apologetic, uncritical studies on World War II. Co-authors Ronald Smelser and Edward J. Davies characterize Panzer Battles as an "exculpatory memoir" within a post-war revisionist narrative. Another modern historian considered descriptions of Russians as "primitive" and with an "Asiatic" mindset to be derogatory or racist. Robert Citino said Mellenthin's book bolstered Western stereotypes of the Red Army as "a faceless and mindless horde" that aimed to "smash everything in its path through numbers, brute force and sheer size". Citino included Panzer Battles among the German officers' memoirs that were "at best unreliable and at worst deliberately misleading", an opinion echoed by historian Daniel Franke, who characterized its impact on the post-war reputation of the Wehrmacht as "baleful", while still recommending it as an important book.

== Editions ==
- Mellenthin, Friedrich von (1971) [1956]. Panzer Battles: A Study of the Employment of Armor in the Second World War (First Ballantine Books ed.). New York: Ballantine Books. ISBN 978-0-345-24440-6.
- Panzer Battles. 1956. Copy of book at the Internet Archive
