= Western Front (World War II) =

Theatre of war in Europe

- Part of the European theatre of World War II
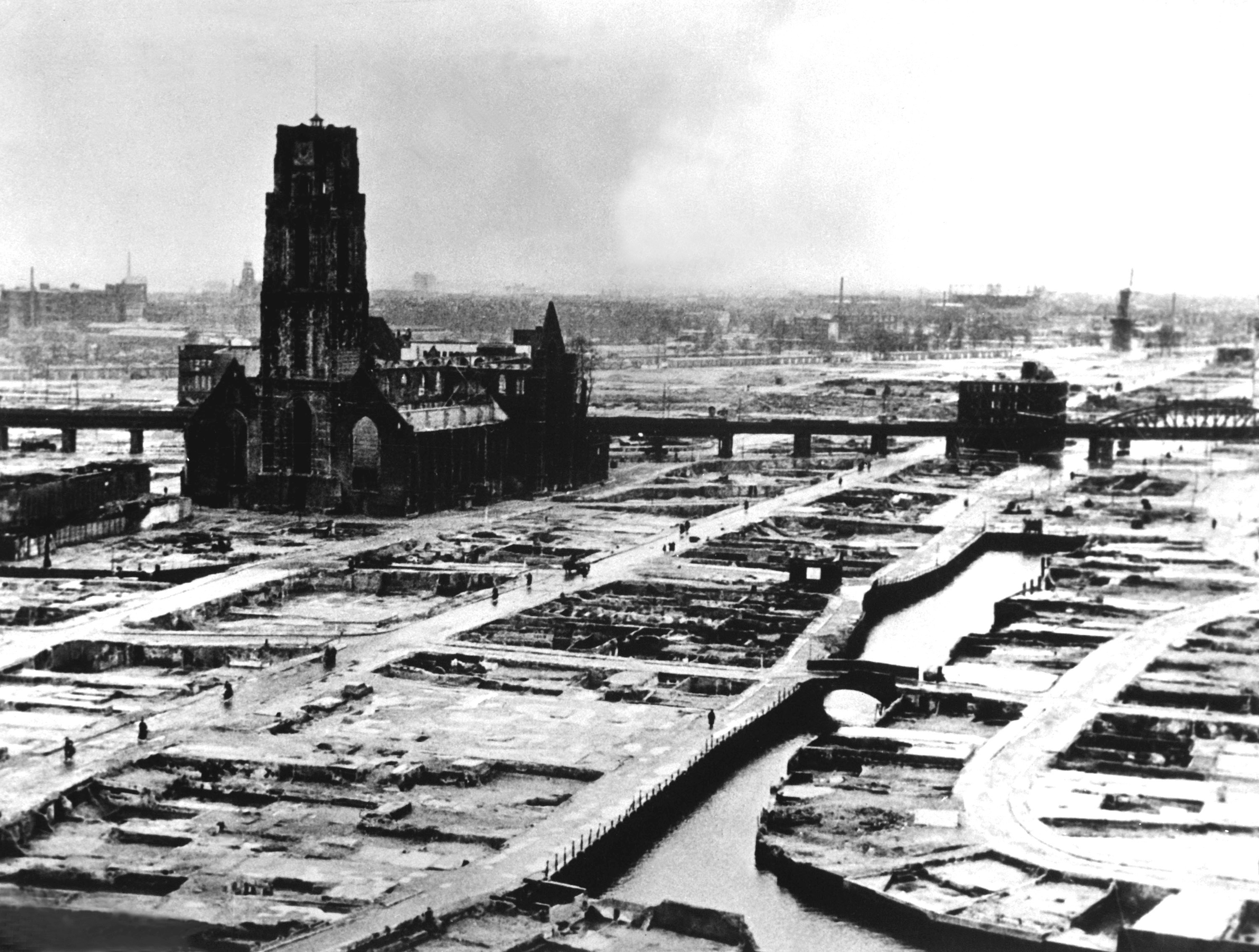
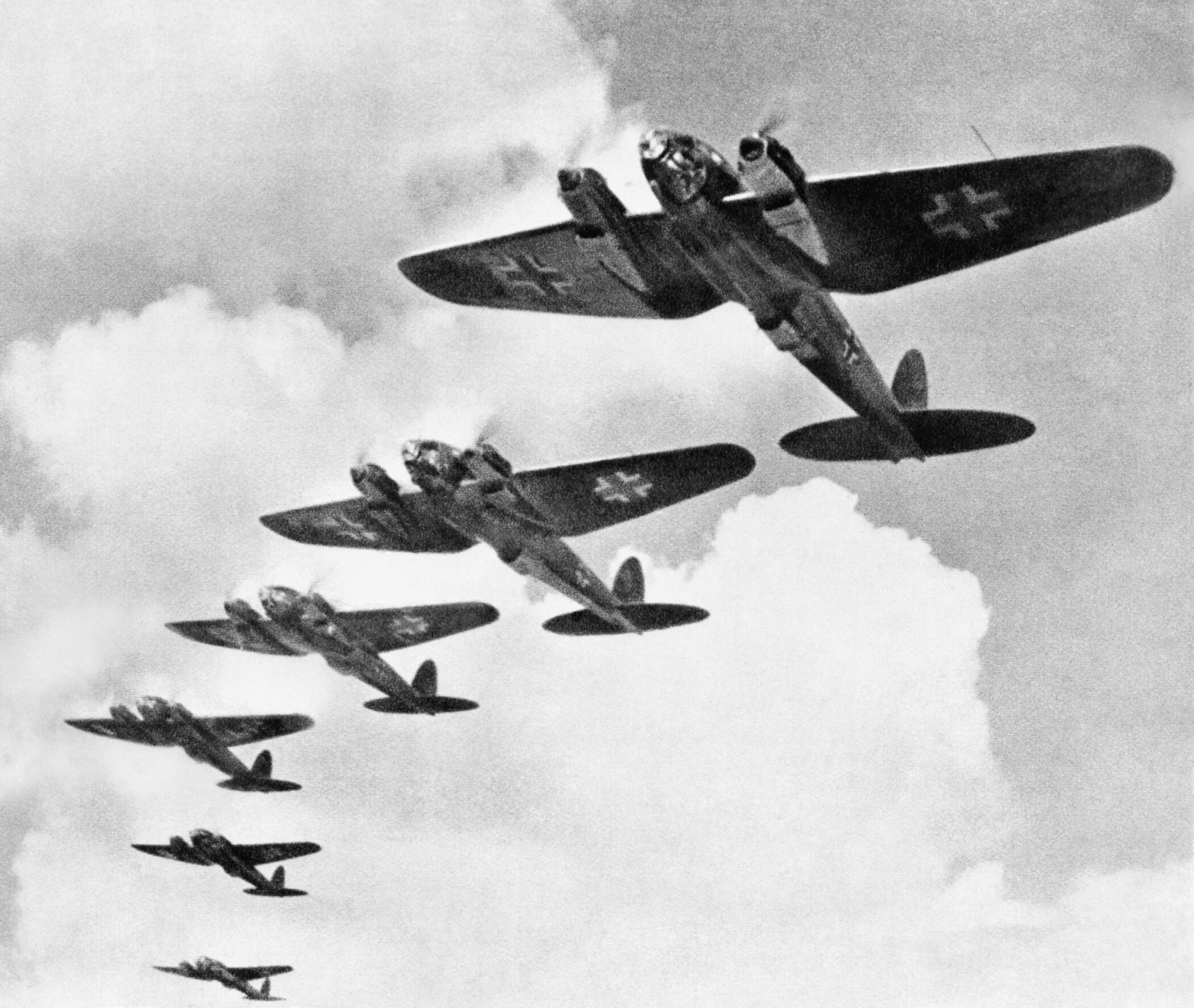
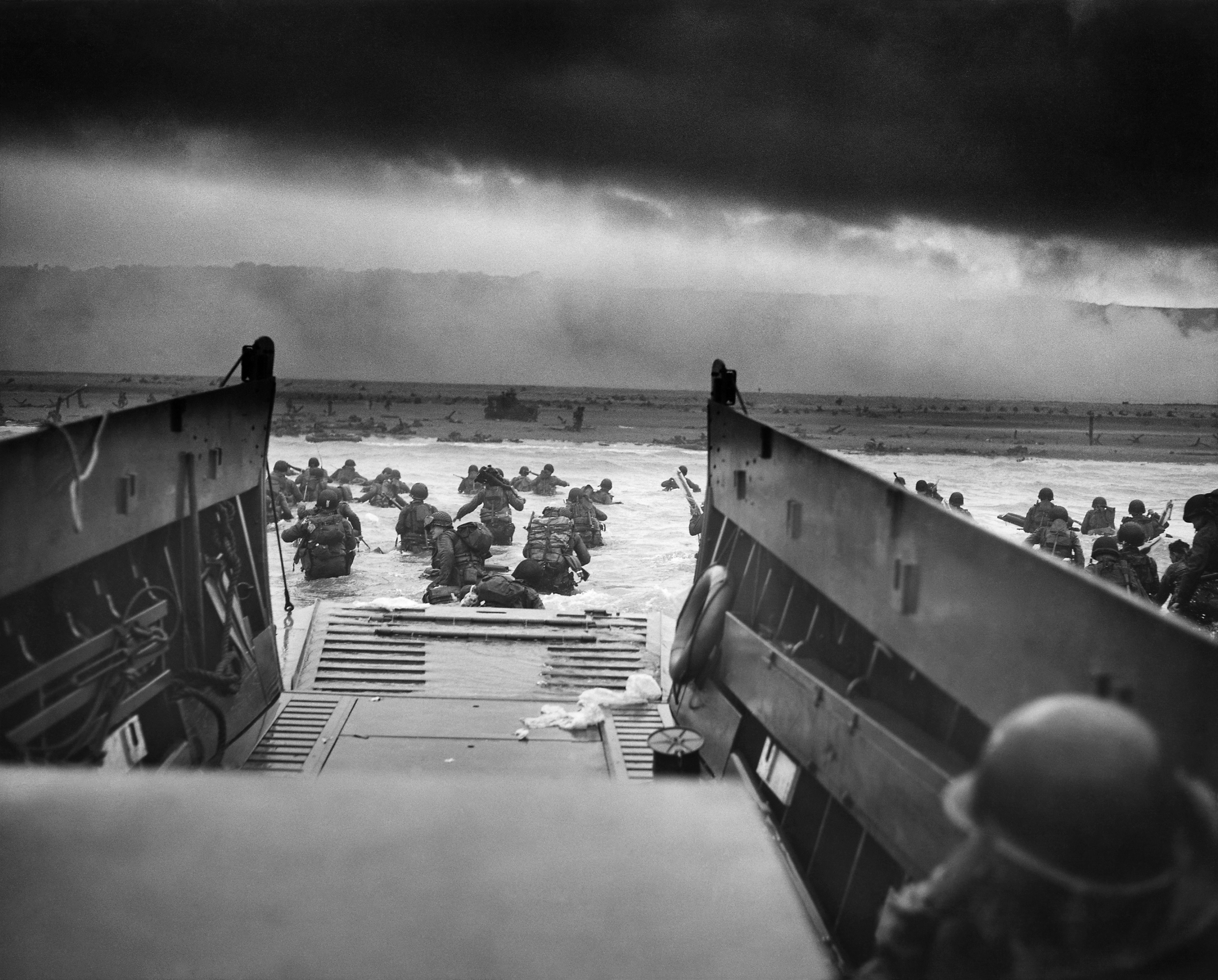
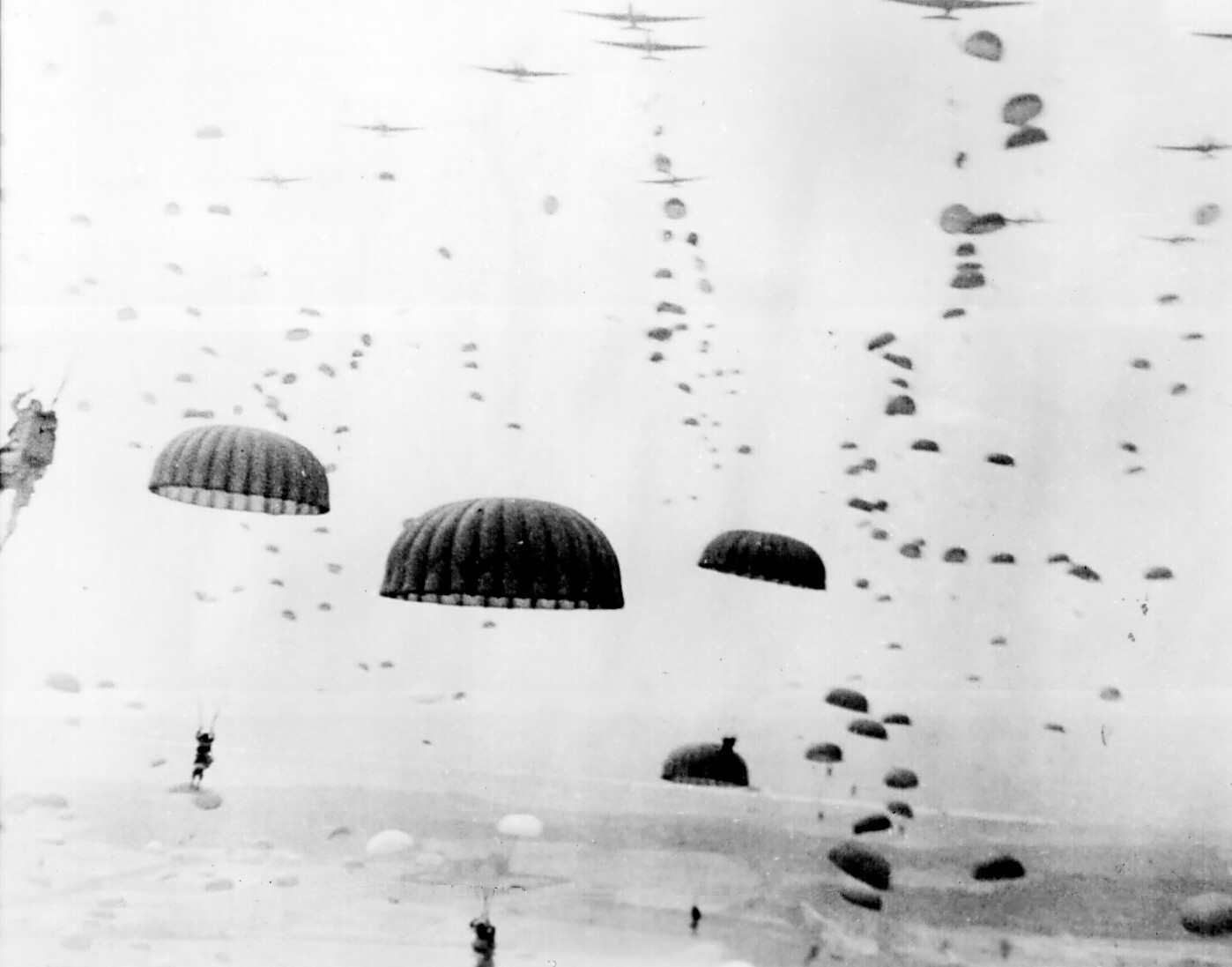
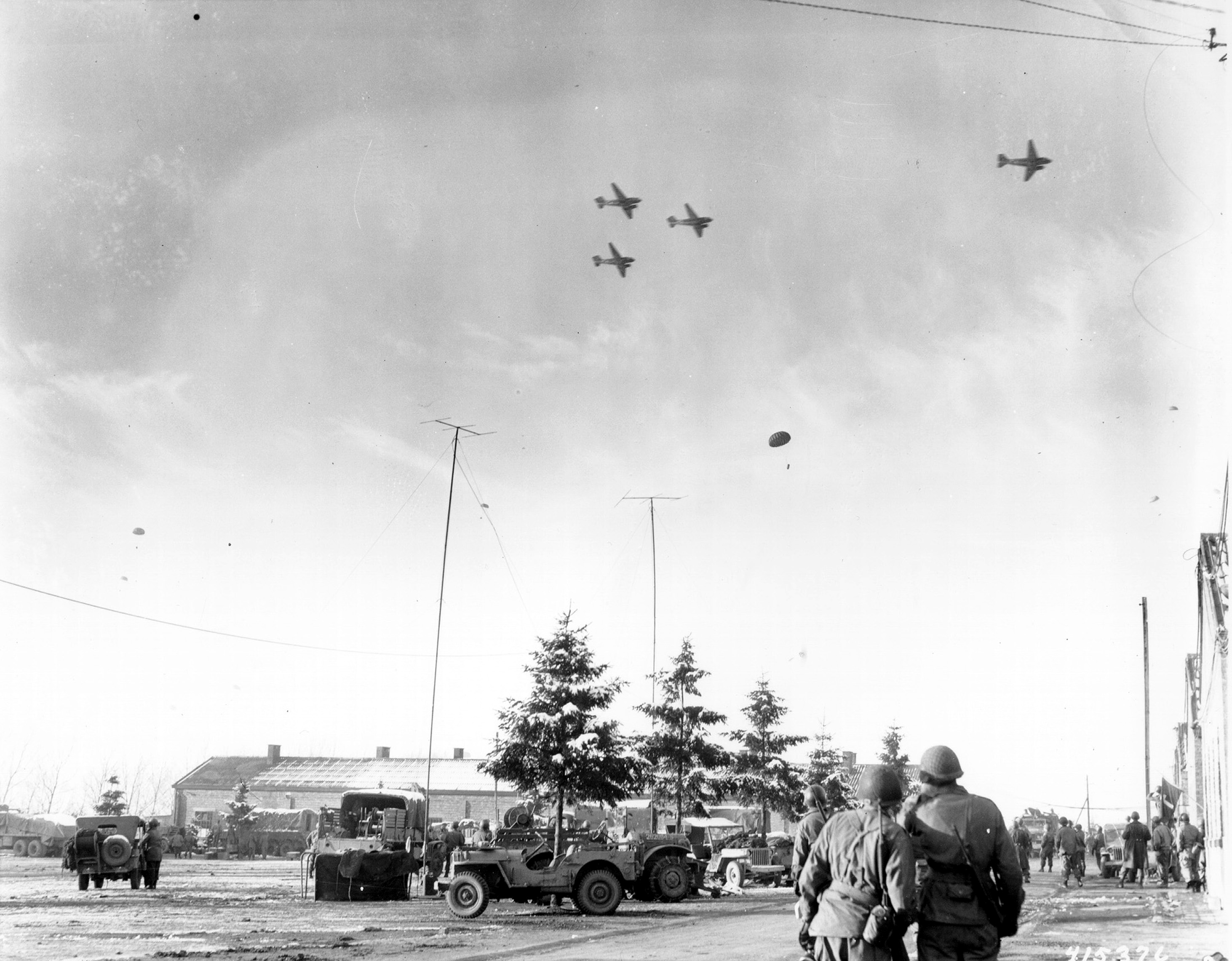
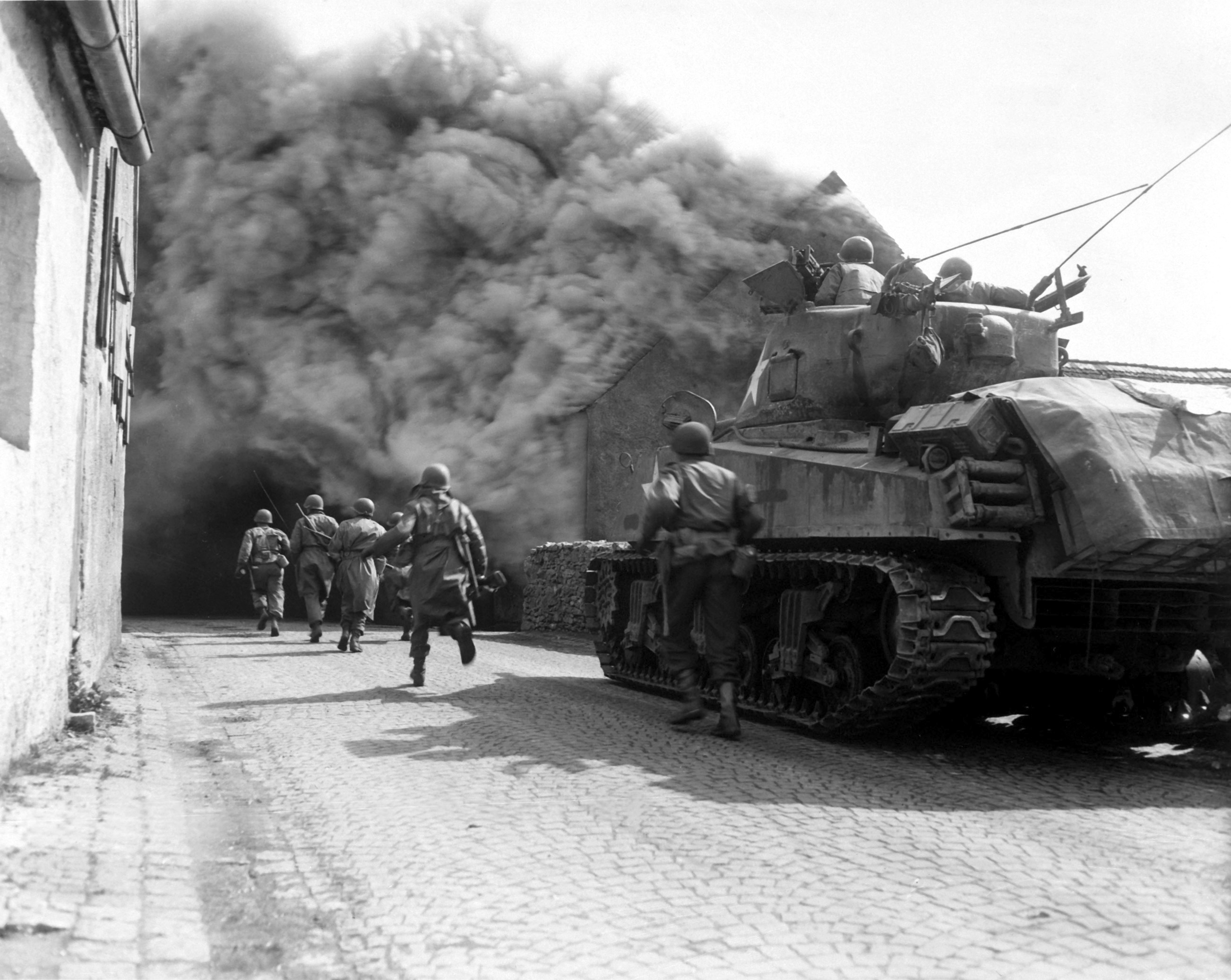
- Clockwise from top left: Rotterdam after the Blitz, German Heinkel He 111 planes during the Battle of Britain, Allied paratroopers during Operation Market Garden, American troops running through Wernberg, Germany, Siege of Bastogne, American troops landing at Omaha Beach during Operation Overlord
Date	3 September 1939 – 25 June 1940 (first phase); 6 June 1944 – 8 May 1945 (second phase) (Note: Interlude with only minimal large-scale military activity like the Dieppe Raid, excluding the Battle of Britain and The Blitz, between 25 June 1940 to 6 June 1944); (5 years, 8 months and 5 days)
Location	Northern and Western Europe
Result	Allied victory
Territorial changes	Occupation of Benelux and Northern France (1940) Partition of Germany (1945)

Belligerents
Allies; 1939–1940; France: (French Third Republic) French West Africa; United Kingdom: (British Raj) India; Poland; Netherlands; Belgium; Luxembourg; Norway; Denmark (9 April 1940); Canada; Czechoslovakia	Axis; 1939–1940; Germany; Italy
1944–1945; United States; United Kingdom: Newfoundland; France; Canada; Poland; Belgium; Luxembourg; Netherlands; Norway; Czechoslovakia (and others)	1944–1945; Germany; Italian Social Republic; French State

Commanders and leaders
1939–1940; Maurice Gamelin (surrendered); Maxime Weygand (surrendered); John Vereker, Lord Gort; William Boyle, Lord Cork; Władysław Sikorski; Henri Winkelman (surrendered); Leopold III (surrendered); Émile Speller (surrendered); Otto Ruge (surrendered); William Prior (surrendered); 1944–1945; Franklin D. Roosevelt # Harry S. Truman; Dwight D. Eisenhower; Winston Churchill; Bernard Montgomery; Arthur Tedder; Omar Bradley; Jacob L. Devers; George S. Patton; Courtney Hodges; William Simpson; Alexander Patch; Miles Dempsey; Trafford Leigh-Mallory †; Bertram Ramsay †; Charles de Gaulle; Jean de Tassigny; Kenneth Stuart; Harry Crerar; Kazimierz Sosnkowski; Stanisław Maczek	1939–1940; Walter von Brauchitsch; Gerd von Rundstedt; Erich von Manstein; Heinz Guderian; Fedor von Bock; Wilhelm von Leeb; Erich Raeder; Nikolaus von Falkenhorst; Prince Umberto; 1944–1945; Adolf Hitler ‡‡ Heinrich Himmler; Hermann Göring; Gerd von Rundstedt; Karl Dönitz; Günther von Kluge ‡‡ Walter Model ‡‡ Albert Kesselring; Erwin Rommel ‡‡ Johannes Blaskowitz; Hermann Balck; Paul Hausser; Benito Mussolini (executed); Rodolfo Graziani (surrendered)

Strength
1939–1940: 7,650,000 troops (total); 1944–1945: ~5,412,219 troops (total that served); 4,500,000 troops (total as of Victory in Europe Day)	1939–1940: 5,400,000 troops (total); 1944–1945: ~8,000,000 troops (total that served); ~1,900,000 troops (peak)

Casualties and losses
1940: 2,121,560 (Note: Ellis provides no figure for Danish casualties, he places Norwegian losses at 2,000 killed or missing with no information provided on those wounded or captured. Dutch casualties are placed at 2,890 killed or missing, 6,900 wounded, with no information provided on those captured. Belgian casualties are placed at 7,500 killed or missing, 15,850 wounded, and 200,000 captured. French casualties amounted to 120,000 killed or missing, 250,000 wounded, and 1,450,000 taken prisoner. British losses totalled to 11,010 killed or missing, 14,070 wounded (only those who were evacuated have been counted), and 41,340 taken prisoner. Losses in 1940, according to Ellis's information, thus amount to 2,121,560.)–2,260,000 (Note: 360,000 dead or wounded, and 1,900,000 captured) casualties, including 143,000 killed and missing; 1944–1945: 164,590–210,000 killed/missing; 537,590 wounded; 78,680 captured (Note: Ellis's numbers: American: 109,820 killed or missing, 356,660 wounded, and 56,630 captured; British: 30,280 killed or missing, 96,670 wounded, 14,700 captured; Canadian: 10,740 killed or missing, 30,910 wounded, 2,250 captured; French: 12,590 killed or missing, 49,510 wounded, 4,730 captured; Poles: 1,160 killed or missing, 3,840 wounded, 370 captured. Thus according to Ellis' information, the Western Allies incurred 783,860 casualties. US Army/Air Forces breakdown: According to a post-war US Army study using war records, the army and army air forces of the United States suffered 586,628 casualties in western Europe, including 116,991 killed in action and 381,350 wounded, of whom 16,264 later died of their wounds. Total US casualties come to 133,255 killed and missing, 365,086 wounded, 73,759 captured, and 14,528 missing, two thousand of whom were later declared dead.); 10,561 tanks destroyed; 909 tank destroyers destroyed; Total: ~3,000,000 casualties (including 355,000–375,000 killed)	1940: 160,780 (Note: 43,110 Germans killed or missing, 111,640 wounded, no information is provided on any who were captured. Italian losses amounted to 1,250 killed or missing, 4,780 wounded, and no information is provided on any who were captured.)–163,650 casualties, (Note: Germany: 157,621 casualties (27,074 dead (The final count of the German dead is possibly as high as 49,000 men when including the losses suffered by the Kriegsmarine, because of additional non-combat causes, the wounded who died of their injuries, and the missing who were confirmed as dead. However this higher figure has not been used in the overall casualty figure), 111,034 wounded, 18,384 missing, as well as 1,129 aircrew killed. Italy: 6,029 casualties (1,247 dead or missing, 2,631 wounded, and 2,151 hospitalised due to frostbite; Italian forces were involved in fighting in the French Alps, where severe sub-zero temperatures is common even during the summer.)) including 49,000 killed or missing; 1944–1945: 263,000–655,000 killed (Note: Based on extrapolations from a statistical sample (see German casualties in World War II), Overmans claims that losses on the Western Front amounted to 244,891 deaths (fallen, deaths from other causes or missing) in 1944 (Table 53, p. 266). As for 1945, Overmans claims that the German armed forces suffered 1,230,045 deaths in the "Final Battles" on the Eastern and Western Fronts from January to May 1945. This figure is broken down as follows (p. 272): 401,660 fallen, 131,066 dead from other causes, 697,319 missing. The number of missing obviously includes soldiers who fell into captivity and died there, possibly months or years later. (The number of deaths in captivity calculated by Overmans is about 459,000, thereof 363,000 in Soviet captivity (p. 286). Overmans' figure of deaths in Soviet captivity is about 700,000 lower than the number (ca. 1,094,000) established between 1962 and 1974 by a German government commission, the Maschke Commission. Overmans (p. 288f.) considers it "plausible, though not provable" that these additional 700,000 perished in Soviet captivity.) Nevertheless, Overmans claims (pp. 275, 279) that all 1,230,045 deaths occurred during the period from January to May 1945. He states that about 2/3 of these deaths occurred on the Eastern Front, without explaining how he arrived at this proportion (according to Table 59 on p. 277, there were 883,130 deaths on the Eastern Front between June and December 1944, and according to Table 53 on p. 266 there were 244,891 deaths on the Western Front in the whole of 1944; the relation between these two figures is 78.29% in the East vs. 21.71% in the West). This would leave 410,000 deaths attributable to the Western Allied invasion of Germany between January and May 1945. Overall Overmans estimates deaths on the Eastern Fronts (by all causes, including POW deaths) as 4 million, and deaths on all other fronts (including POW deaths and deaths attributable to bombing) as 1.3 million (p. 265). He believes the men reported as missing on the Eastern Front died either from combat or in captivity. On page 286, he estimates ~80,000 German troops died in Allied POW camps after the war: 34,000 in French camps, 22,000 in American camps, 21,000 in UK camps, and several thousand more in Belgian and Dutch camps.); 400,000+ wounded; 4,209,840 captured (Note: Total German casualties between September 1939 to 31 December 1944, on the Western Front for both the army, Waffen SS, and foreign volunteers amounts to 128,030 killed, 399,860 wounded. 7,614,790 were held in POW camps by early June of 1945 (including 3,404,950 who were disarmed following the surrender of Germany) See also: Disarmed Enemy Forces); Total: 5,000,000–5,400,000+ casualties (including 400,000–750,000 killed)
- Civilian casualties: 1,650,000 dead (Note: All totals listed only include direct deaths due to military activity and crimes against humanity, including the Holocaust. Germany: 910,000. 410,000 in Allied strategic bombing, 300,000 in the Holocaust not including Austrian civilian deaths or deaths from the Nazi T4 program. Counting the Aktion T4 program adds 200,000+ deaths to the total. France: 390,000. Includes 77,000 French Jews in the Holocaust. Netherlands: 187,300. Includes 100,000 Dutch Jews in the Holocaust. Belgium: 76,000. Includes 27,000 Belgian Jews in the Holocaust. United Kingdom: 67,200. Mostly died in German bombing. Norway: 8,200. Includes 800 Norwegian Jews in the Holocaust. Denmark: 6,000. Luxembourg: 5,000. Includes 2,000 Luxembourgish Jews.)

The Western Front was a military theatre of World War II encompassing Denmark, Norway, Luxembourg, Belgium, the Netherlands, the United Kingdom, France, and Germany. The Italian front is considered a separate but related theatre. (Note: German deployments to the Western Front (plus Italy) reached levels as high as approximately 40% of their ground forces, and 75% of the Luftwaffe. During 1944, there were approximately 69 German divisions in France, in Italy, there were around 19. (Approximate data is given because the number of units changed over time as a result of troop transfers and the arrival of new units.) According to David Glantz, in January 1945 the Axis fielded over 2.3 million men, including 60 percent of the Wehrmacht's forces and the forces of virtually all of its remaining allies, against the Red Army. In the course of the ensuing winter campaign, the Wehrmacht suffered 510,000 losses in the East against 325,000 in the West. By April 1945, 1,960,000 German troops faced the 6.4 million Red Army troops at the gates of Berlin, in Czechoslovakia, and in numerous isolated pockets to the east, while four million Allied forces in western Germany faced under one million Wehrmacht soldiers. In May 1945 the Soviets accepted the surrender of almost 1.5 million men, while almost one million Germans soldiers surrendered to the British and Americans, including many who fled west to escape the dreaded Red Army.) The Western Front's 1944–1945 phase was officially deemed the European Theater by the United States, whereas Italy fell under the Mediterranean Theater along with the North African campaign. The Western Front was marked by two phases of large-scale combat operations. The first phase saw the capitulation of Luxembourg, Netherlands, Belgium, and France during May and June 1940 after their defeat in the Low Countries and the northern half of France, and continued into an air war between Germany and Britain that climaxed with the Battle of Britain. The second phase consisted of large-scale ground combat (supported by a massive strategic air war considered to be an additional front), which began in June 1944 with the Allied landings in Normandy and continued until the defeat of Germany in May 1945 with its invasion.

== 1939–1940: Axis victories ==
On 1 September 1939, World War II began with the German invasion of Poland. In response, Britain and France declared war on Germany on 3 September. The next few months in the war were marked by the Phoney War.

=== Phoney War ===
The Phoney War was an early phase of World War II marked by a few military operations in Continental Europe in the months following the German invasion of Poland and preceding the Battle of France. Although the great powers of Europe had declared war on one another, neither side had yet committed to launching a significant attack, and there was relatively little fighting on the ground. This was also the period in which the United Kingdom and France did not supply significant aid to Poland, despite their pledged alliance.

The French forces launched a small offensive, the Saar Offensive against Germany in the Saar region but halted their advance and returned. While most of the German Army was fighting against Poland, a much smaller German force manned the Siegfried Line, their fortified defensive line along the French border. At the Maginot Line on the other side of the border, French troops stood facing them, whilst the British Expeditionary Force and other elements of the French Army created a defensive line along the Belgian border. There were only some local, minor skirmishes. The British Royal Air Force dropped propaganda leaflets on Germany and the first Canadian troops stepped ashore in Britain, while Western Europe was in a strange calm for seven months.

In their hurry to re-arm, Britain and France had both begun to buy large numbers of weapons from manufacturers in the United States at the outbreak of hostilities, supplementing their own production. The non-belligerent United States contributed to the Western Allies by discounted sales of military equipment and supplies. German efforts to interdict the Allies' trans-Atlantic trade at sea ignited the Battle of the Atlantic.

=== Operation Weserübung ===
While the Western Front remained quiet in April 1940, the fighting between the Allies and the Germans began in earnest with the Norwegian Campaign when the Germans launched Operation Weserübung, the German invasion of Denmark and Norway. In doing so, the Germans beat the Allies to the punch; the Allies had been planning an amphibious landing in which they could begin to surround Germany, cutting off her supply of raw materials from Sweden. However, when the Allies made a counter-landing in Norway following the German invasion, the Germans repulsed them and defeated the Norwegian armed forces, driving the latter into exile. The Kriegsmarine, nonetheless, suffered very heavy losses during the two months of fighting required to seize all of mainland Norway.

=== Battles for Luxembourg, the Netherlands, Belgium and France ===
In May 1940, the Germans launched the Battle of France. The Western Allies (primarily the French, Belgian and British land forces) soon collapsed under the onslaught of the so-called "blitzkrieg" strategy. Following the German breakthrough at Sedan, the BEF, along with the best of the French and Belgian armies, became trapped in Flanders. With the use of paratroopers and concentrated firepower, the Belgian and Dutch armies surrendered after several days. Luxembourg fell within the first day.

The majority of the British and elements of the French forces escaped at Dunkirk. This was due to the combined factors of poor weather, Germans mishaps, and the incredible number of British civilian ships assembled for the undertaking. Following the conclusion of events at Dunkirk on June 4, the Wehrmacht commenced Fall Rot, an offensive against the remaining French armies. With most of the French armies either destroyed or taken prisoner, the Germans quickly broke through the French lines, taking Paris on June 14. As France was falling, the British began the strategic withdrawal of all remaining British troops from France, via French ports still under Allied control.

With the war all but decided, Italy also declared war on the UK and France, but made little progress. With the situation becoming dire, French Prime Minister Philippe Pétain signed the Second Armistice of Compiègne on June 22, 1940, with its terms taking effect on the 25th of June. The terms of the armistice called for the occupation of Northern France, along with the annexation of Alsace-Lorraine into the German Reich. Italy also was allowed a small occupation zone in the southeast. France was allowed to continue its existence in the form of Vichy France, a rump state of the former French Republic, led by Philippe Pétain. The Vichy regime was allowed to keep their colonial empire and navy, as some of Hitler's few concessions.

In six weeks of fighting, the combined allied armies suffered more than 375,000 killed or wounded, as well as 1,800,000 soldiers becoming prisoners of war. Meanwhile, Germany suffered a more modest 43,110 killed and 111,000 wounded. Hitler had expected a million men to die in the conquest of France. Remarkedly low casualties and France's quick defeat led to a massive rise in morale among the German people. With the fighting ended, the Germans began to consider ways of resolving the question of how to deal with Britain. If the British refused to agree to a peace treaty, one option was to invade. However, Nazi Germany's Kriegsmarine, had suffered serious losses in Norway, and in order to even consider an amphibious landing, Germany's Air Force (the Luftwaffe) had to first gain air superiority or air supremacy.

== 1941–1944: Interlude ==
With the Luftwaffe unable to defeat the RAF in the Battle of Britain, the invasion of Great Britain could no longer be thought of as an option. While the majority of the German army was mustered for the invasion of the Soviet Union, construction began on the Atlantic Wall – a series of defensive fortifications along the French coast of the English Channel. These were built in anticipation of an Allied invasion of France.

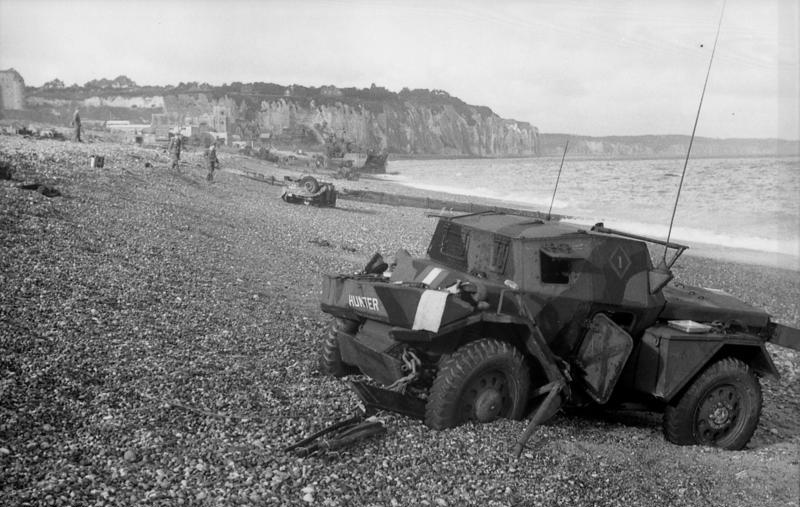
Dieppe's pebble beach and cliff immediately following the raid on 19 August 1942. A scout car has been abandoned.

Because of the massive logistical obstacles a cross-channel invasion would face, the Allied high command decided to conduct a practice attack against the French coast. On 19 August 1942, the Allies began the Dieppe Raid, an attack on Dieppe, France. Most of the troops were Canadian, with some British contingents and a small American and Free French presence along with British and Polish naval support. The raid was a disaster, almost two-thirds of the attacking force became casualties. However, much was learned as a result of the operation – these lessons would be put to good use in the subsequent invasion.

For almost two years, there was no land-fighting on the Western Front with the exception of commando raids and the guerrilla actions of the resistance aided by the Special Operations Executive (SOE) and Office of Strategic Services (OSS). However, in the meantime, the Allies took the war to Germany, with a strategic bombing campaign - the US Eighth Air Force bombing Germany by day and RAF Bomber Command bombing by night. The bulk of the Allied armies were occupied in the Mediterranean, seeking to clear the sea lanes to the Indian Ocean, repulse the Axis from North Africa, and commence the invasion of Italy, partly to capture the Foggia Airfield Complex.

Two early British raids for which battle honours were awarded were Operation Collar in Boulogne (24 June 1940) and Operation Ambassador in Guernsey (14–15 July 1940). The raids for which the British awarded the "North-West Europe Campaign of 1942" battle honour were: Operation Biting – Bruneval (27–28 February 1942), St Nazaire (27–28 March 1942), Operation Myrmidon – Bayonne (5 April 1942), Operation Abercrombie – Hardelot (21–22 April 1942), Dieppe (19 August 1942) and Operation Frankton – Gironde (7–12 December 1942).

A raid on Sark on the night of 3/4 October 1942 is notable because a few days after the incursion the Germans issued a propaganda communiqué implying at least one prisoner had escaped and two were shot while resisting having their hands tied. This instance of tying prisoner's hands contributed to Hitler's decision to issue his Commando Order instructing that all captured Commandos or Commando-type personnel were to be executed as a matter of procedure.

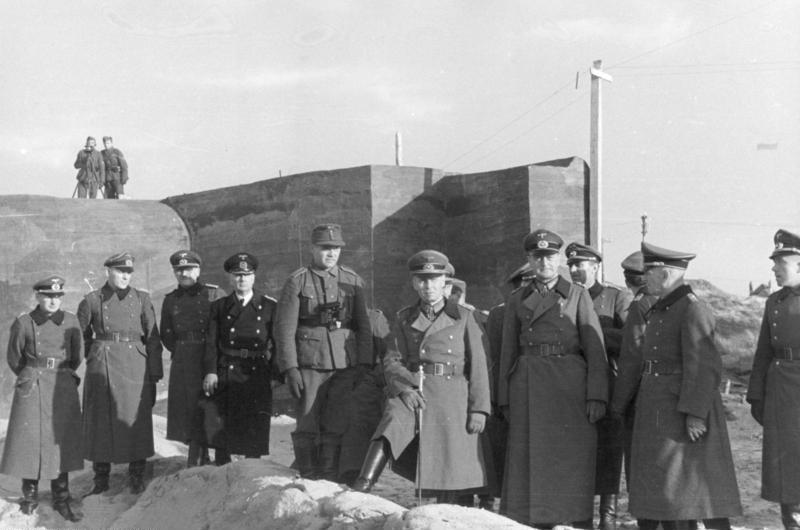
Erwin Rommel visiting Atlantic Wall defences near Ostend, 21 December 1943

By the summer of 1944, when an expectation of an Allied invasion was freely admitted by German commanders, the disposition of troops facing it came under the command of OB West (HQ in Paris). In turn, it commanded: the Wehrmacht Netherlands Command (Wehrmachtbefehlshaber Niederlande) or WBN, covering the Dutch and Belgian coasts; Army Group B, covering the coast of northern France with the German 15th Army (HQ in Tourcoing), in the area north of the Seine and the 7th Army, (HQ in Le Mans), between the Seine and the Loire defending the English Channel and the Atlantic coast; and Army Group G with responsibility for the Bay of Biscay coast and Vichy France, with its 1st Army, (HQ in Bordeaux), responsible for the Atlantic coast between the Loire and the Spanish border and the 19th Army, (HQ in Avignon), responsible for the Mediterranean coast.

It was not possible to predict where the Allies might choose to launch their invasion. The chance of an amphibious landing necessitated the substantial dispersal of the German mobile reserves, which contained the majority of their panzer troops. Each army group was allocated its mobile reserves. Army Group B had the 2nd Panzer Division in northern France, 116th Panzer Division in the Paris area, and the 21st Panzer Division in Normandy. Army Group G, considering the possibility of an invasion on the Atlantic coast, had dispersed its mobile reserves, locating the 11th Panzer Division in Gironde, the 2nd SS Panzer Division Das Reich refitting around the southern French town of Montauban, and the 9th Panzer Division stationed in the Rhone delta area.

The OKW retained a substantial reserve of such mobile divisions also, but these were dispersed over a large area: the 1st SS Panzer Division Leibstandarte SS Adolf Hitler was still in the Netherlands, the 12th SS Panzer Division Hitlerjugend and the Panzer-Lehr Division were located in the Paris–Orleans area, since the Normandy coastal defence sectors or (Küstenverteitigungsabschnitte – KVA) were considered the most likely areas for an invasion. The 17th SS Panzergrenadier Division Götz von Berlichingen was located just south of the Loire in the vicinity of Tours.

== 1944–1945: The Second Front ==
=== Allied landing in Normandy ===
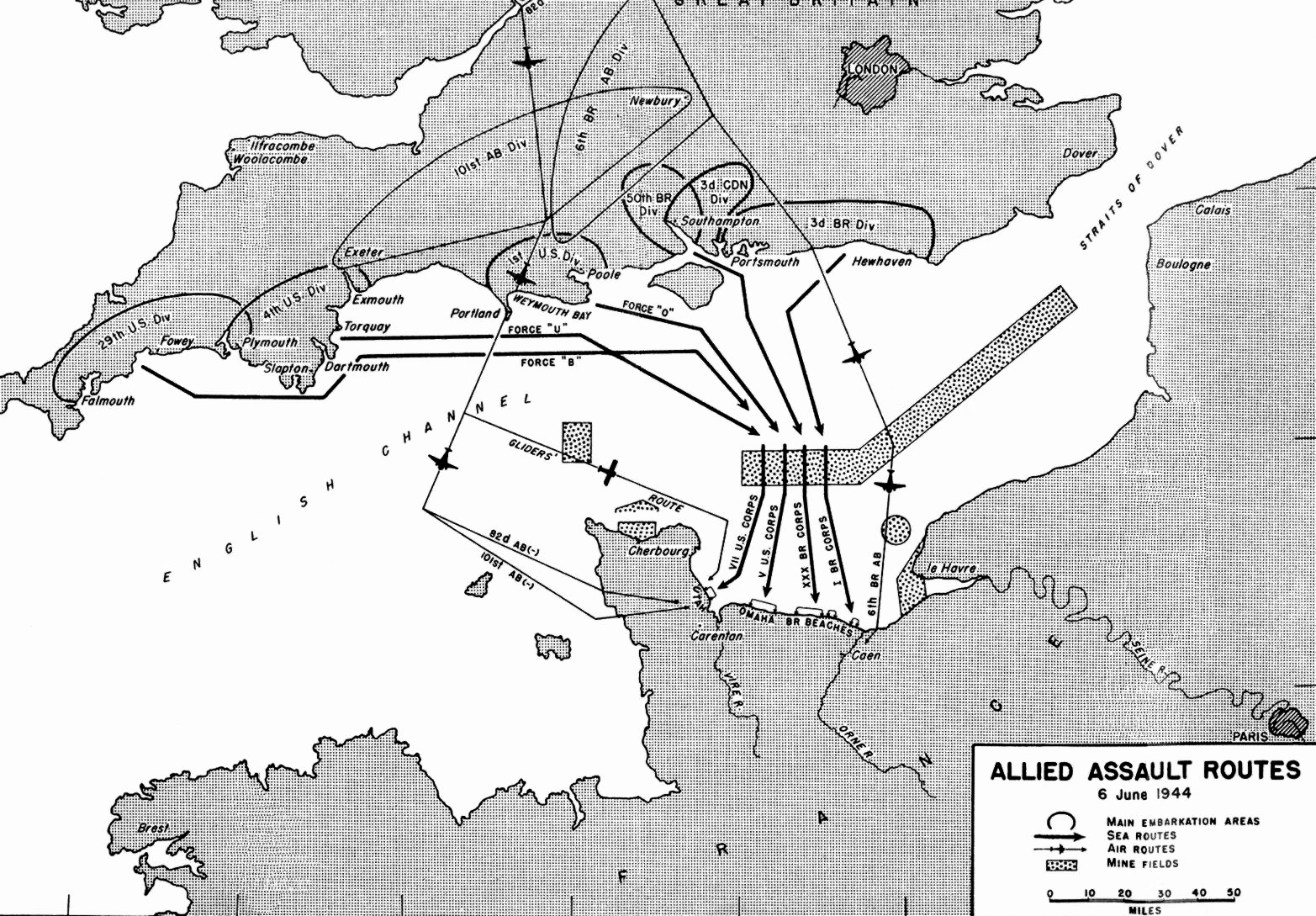
Routes taken by the D-Day invasion

On 6 June 1944, the Allies began Operation Overlord (also known as "D-Day") – the long-awaited liberation of France. The deception plans, Operation Fortitude and Operation Bodyguard, had the Germans convinced that the invasion would occur in the Pas-de-Calais, while the real target was Normandy. Following two months of slow fighting in hedgerow country, Operation Cobra allowed the Americans to break out at the western end of the lodgement. Soon after, the Allies were racing across France. They encircled around 200,000 Germans in the Falaise Pocket. As had so often happened on the Eastern Front Hitler refused to allow a strategic withdrawal until it was too late. Approximately 150,000 Germans were able to escape from the Falaise pocket, but they left behind most of their irreplaceable equipment and 50,000 Germans were killed or taken prisoner.

The Allies had been arguing about whether to advance on a broad-front or a narrow-front from before D-Day. If the British had broken out of the Normandy bridgehead (or beachhead) around Caen when they launched Operation Goodwood and pushed along the coast, facts on the ground might have turned the argument in favour of a narrow front. However, as the breakout took place during Operation Cobra at the western end of the bridge-head, the 21st Army Group that included the British and Canadian forces swung east and headed for Belgium, the Netherlands and Northern Germany, while the U.S. Twelfth Army Group advanced to their south via eastern France, Luxembourg and the Ruhr Area, rapidly fanning out into a broad front. As this was the strategy favoured by the Supreme Allied Commander, General Dwight D. Eisenhower, and most of the American high command, it was soon adopted.

=== Liberation of France ===
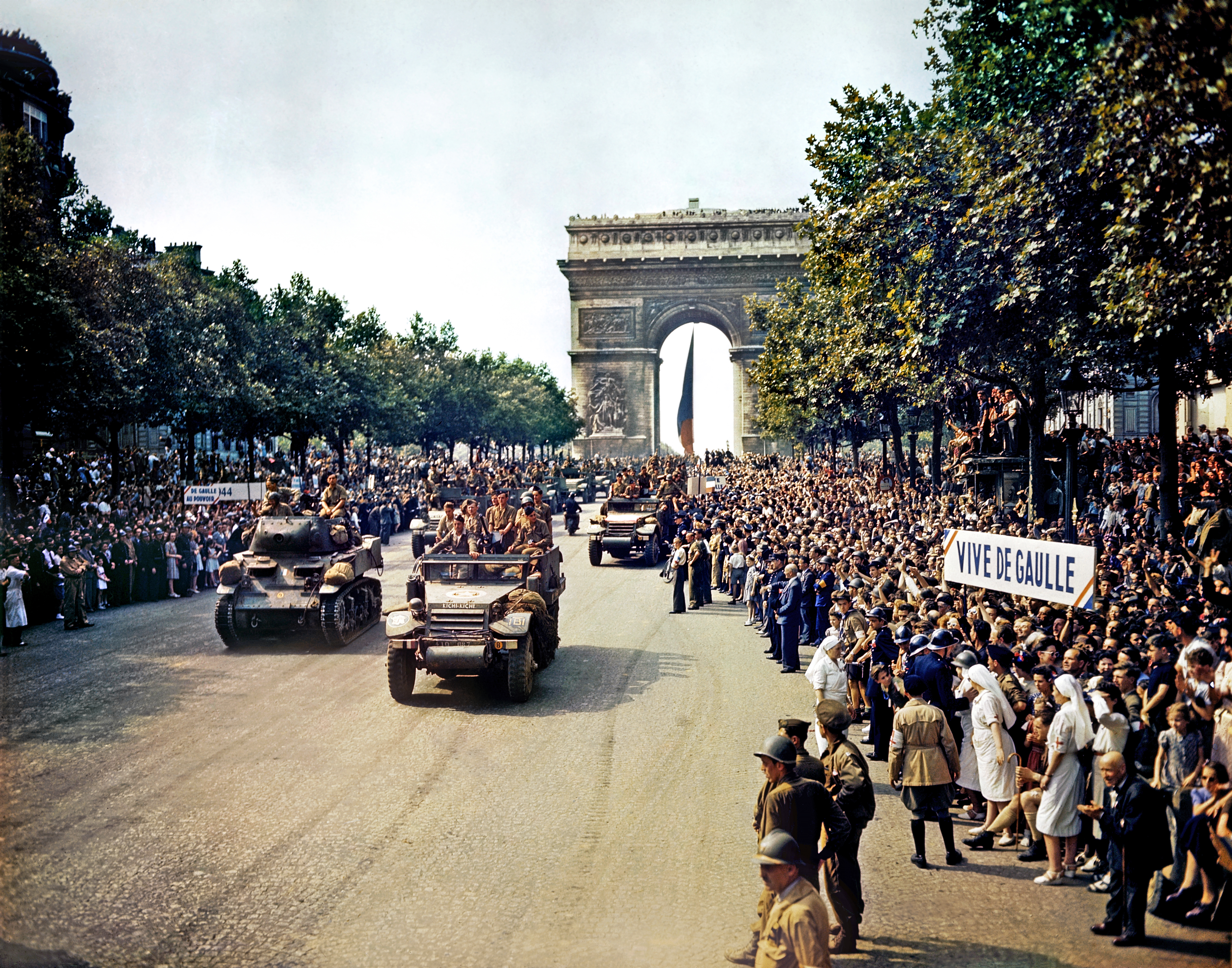
Crowds of French people line the Champs Élysées following the Liberation of Paris, 26 August 1944.

On 15 August the Allies launched Operation Dragoon – the invasion of Southern France between Toulon and Cannes. The US Seventh Army and the French First Army, making up the US 6th Army Group, rapidly consolidated this beachhead and liberated Southern France in two weeks; they then moved north up the Rhone valley. Their advance only slowed down as they encountered regrouped and entrenched German troops in the Vosges Mountains.

The Germans in France were now faced by three powerful Allied army groups: in the north the British 21st Army Group commanded by Field Marshal Sir Bernard Montgomery, in the center the American 12th Army Group, commanded by General Omar Bradley and to the south the US 6th Army Group commanded by Lieutenant General Jacob L. Devers. By mid-September, the 6th Army Group, advancing from the south, came into contact with Bradley's formations advancing from the west and overall control of Devers' force passed from AFHQ in the Mediterranean so that all three army groups came under Eisenhower's central command at SHAEF (Supreme Headquarters, Allied Expeditionary Forces).

Under the onslaught in both the north and south of France, the German Army fell back. On 19 August, the French Resistance (FFI) organised a general uprising and the liberation of Paris took place on 25 August when general Dietrich von Choltitz accepted the French ultimatum and surrendered to General Philippe Leclerc de Hauteclocque, commander of the Free French 2nd Armored Division, ignoring orders from Hitler that Paris should be held to the last and destroyed.

The liberation of Northern France and the Benelux countries was of special significance for the inhabitants of London and the southeast of England because it denied the Germans launch sites for their mobile V-1 and V-2 Vergeltungswaffen (reprisal weapons).

As the Allies advanced across France, their supply lines stretched to breaking point. The Red Ball Express, the Allied trucking effort, was simply unable to transport enough supplies from the port facilities in Normandy all the way to the front line, which by September, was close to the German border.

Major German units in the French southwest that had not been committed in Normandy withdrew, either eastwards towards Alsace (sometimes directly across the US 6th Army Group's advance) or into the ports with the intention of denying them to the Allies. These latter groups were not thought worth much effort and were left "to rot", with the exception of Bordeaux, which was liberated in May 1945 by French forces under General Edgard de Larminat (Operation Venerable).

=== Allied advance from Paris to the Rhine ===
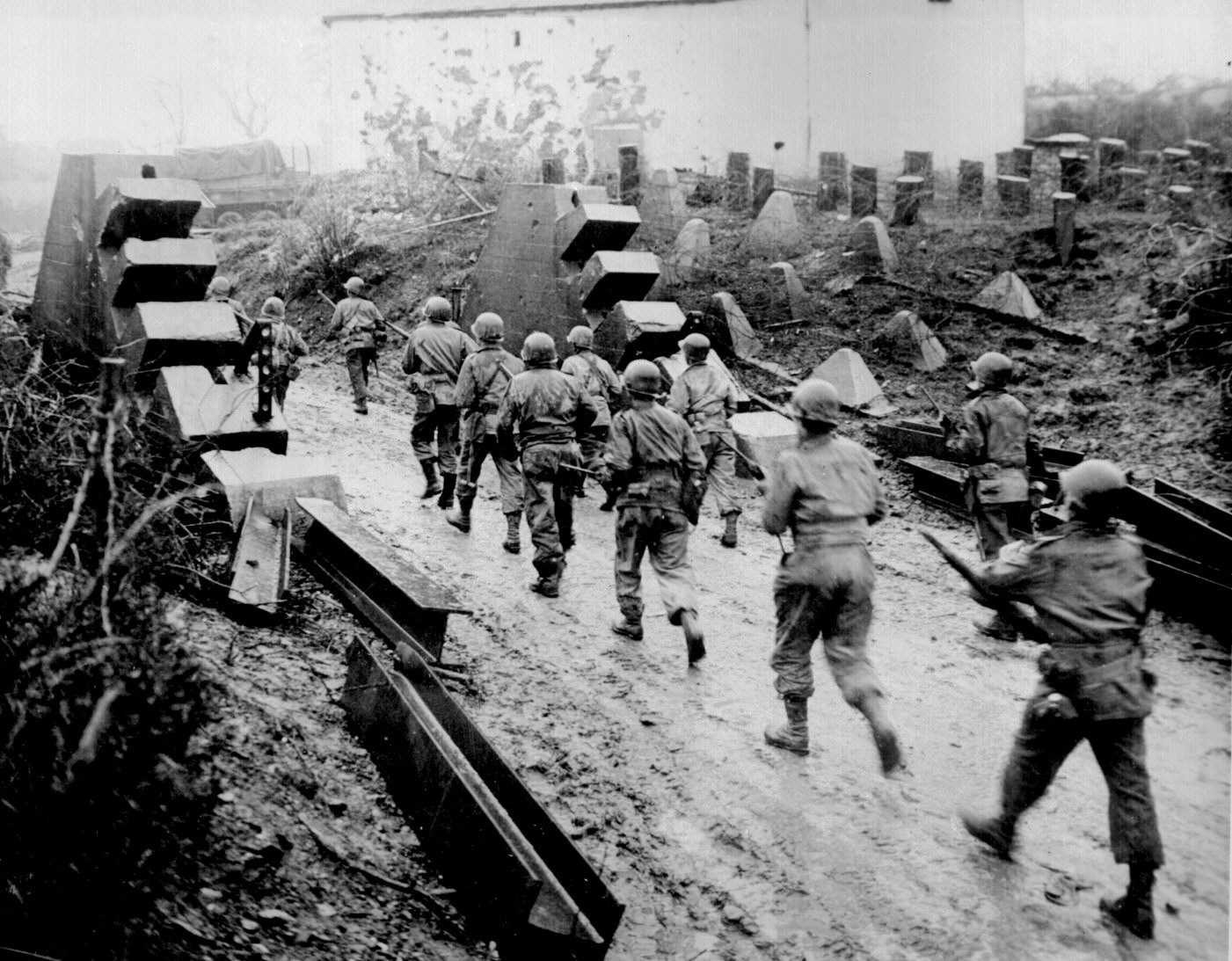
American troops cross the Siegfried Line into Germany.

Fighting on the Western front seemed to stabilize, and the Allied advance stalled in front of the Siegfried Line (Westwall) and the southern reaches of the Rhine. Starting in early September, the Americans began slow and bloody fighting through the Hurtgen Forest ("Passchendaele with tree bursts"—Hemingway) to breach the Line.

The port of Antwerp was liberated on 4 September by the British 11th Armoured Division. However, it lay at the end of the long Scheldt Estuary, and so it could not be used until its approaches were clear of heavily fortified German positions. The Breskens pocket on the southern bank of the Scheldt was cleared with heavy casualties by Allied forces in Operation Switchback, during the Battle of the Scheldt. This was followed by a tedious campaign to clear a peninsula dominating the estuary, and finally, the amphibious assault on Walcheren Island in November. The campaign to clear the Scheldt Estuary along with Operation Pheasant was a decisive victory for the Allies, as it allowed a greatly improved delivery of supplies directly from Antwerp, which was far closer to the front than the Normandy beaches.

In October the Americans decided that they could not just invest Aachen and let it fall in a slow siege, because it threatened the flanks of the U.S. Ninth Army. As it was the first major German city to face capture, Hitler ordered that the city be held at all costs. In the resulting battle, the city was taken, at a cost of 5,000 casualties on both sides, with an additional 5,600 German prisoners.

South of the Ardennes, American forces fought from September until mid-December to push the Germans out of Lorraine and from behind the Siegfried Line. The crossing of the Moselle River and the capture of the fortress of Metz proved difficult for the American troops in the face of German reinforcements, supply shortages, and unfavorable weather. During September and October, the Allied 6th Army Group (U.S. Seventh Army and French First Army) fought a difficult campaign through the Vosges Mountains that was marked by dogged German resistance and slow advances. In November, however, the German front snapped under the pressure, resulting in sudden Allied advances that liberated Belfort, Mulhouse, and Strasbourg, and placed Allied forces along the Rhine River. The Germans managed to hold a large bridgehead (the Colmar Pocket), on the western bank of the Rhine and centered around the city of Colmar. On 16 November the Allies started a large scale autumn offensive called Operation Queen. With its main thrust again through the Hürtgen Forest, the offensive drove the Allies to the Rur River, but failed in its core objectives to capture the Rur dams and pave the way towards the Rhine. The Allied operations were then succeeded by the German Ardennes offensive.

=== Operation Market Garden ===
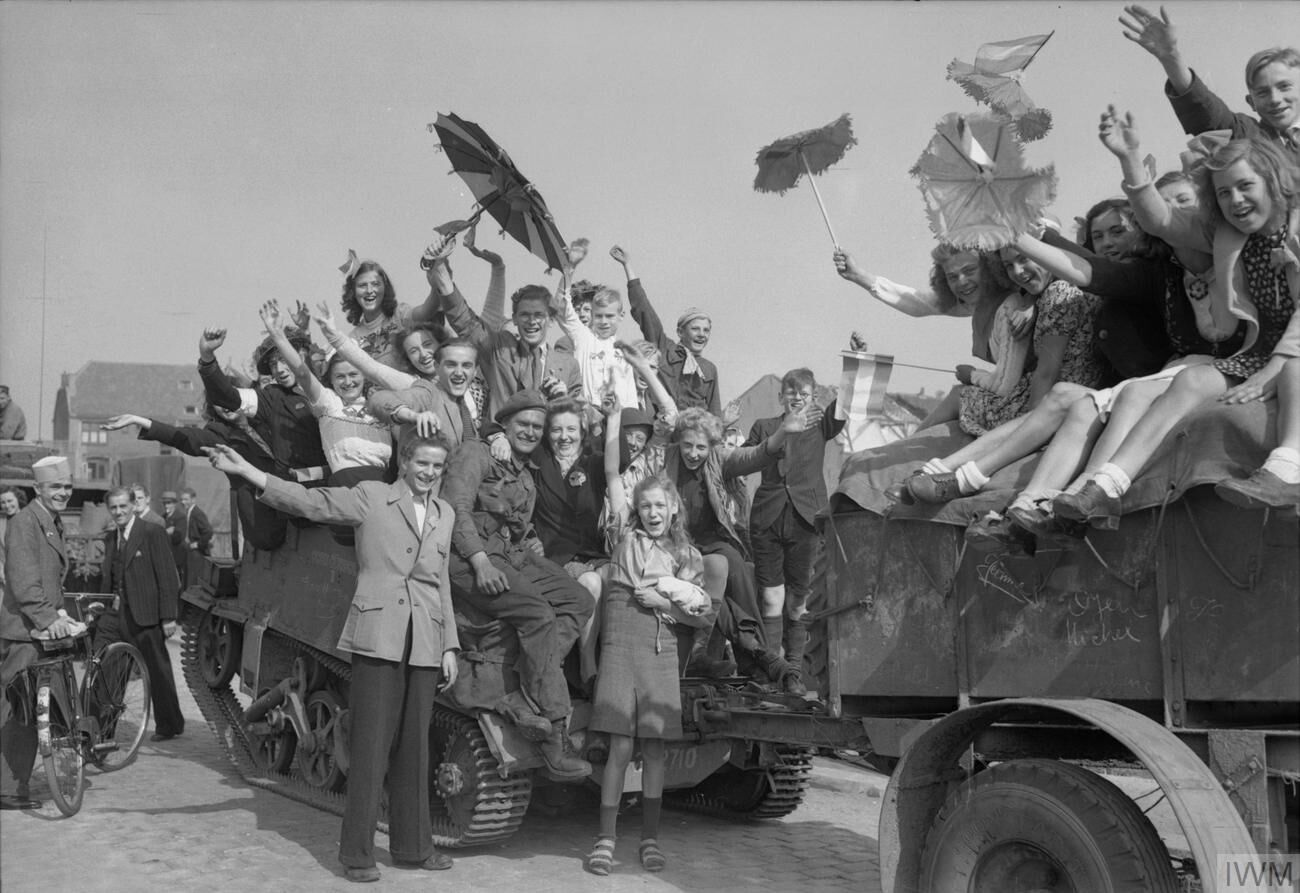
Dutch civilians celebrate the liberation of Eindhoven.

The port of Antwerp was liberated on 4 September by the British 11th Armoured Division. Field Marshal Sir Bernard Montgomery, commanding the Anglo-Canadian 21st Army Group, persuaded the Allied High Command to launch a bold attack, Operation Market Garden, which he hoped would get the Allies across the Rhine and create the narrow-front he favoured. Airborne troops would fly in from the United Kingdom and take bridges over the main rivers of the German-occupied Netherlands in three main cities; Eindhoven, Nijmegen, and Arnhem. The British XXX Corps would punch through the German lines along the Maas–Schelde canal and link up with the airborne troops of the U.S. 101st Airborne Division in Eindhoven, the U.S. 82nd Airborne Division at Nijmegen and the British 1st Airborne Division at Arnhem. If all went well XXX Corps would advance into Germany without any remaining major obstacles. XXX Corps was able to advance beyond six of the seven airborne-held bridges but was unable to link up with the troops near the bridge over the Rhine at Arnhem.

The result was the near-destruction of the British 1st Airborne Division during the Battle of Arnhem, which sustained almost 8,000 casualties. The offensive ended with Arnhem remaining in German hands and the Allies holding an extended salient from the Belgian border to the area between Nijmegen and Arnhem. A German attempt to recapture the salient ended in failure in early October.

=== Winter counter-offensives ===
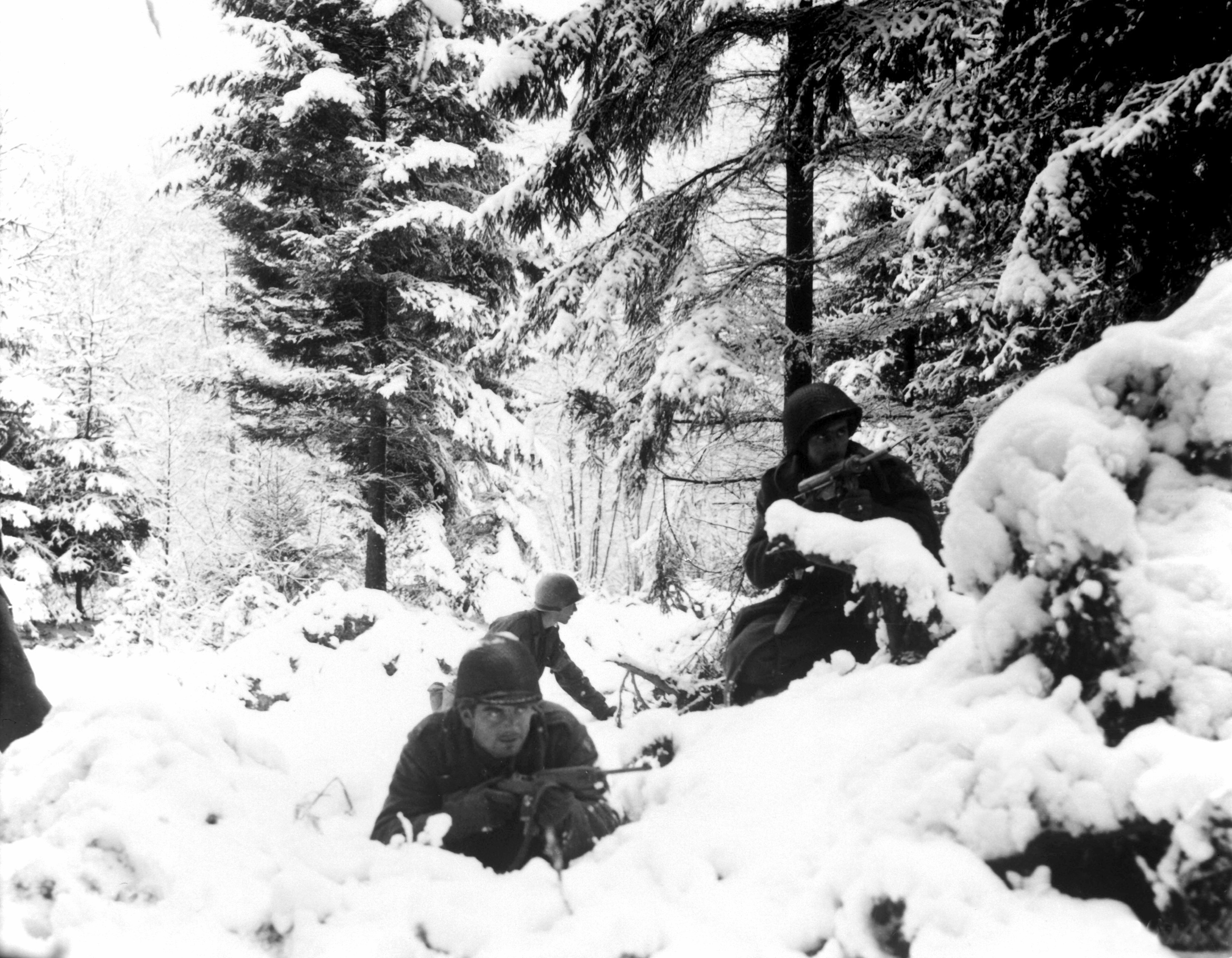
American soldiers taking up defensive positions in the Ardennes during the Battle of the Bulge

The Germans had been preparing a massive counter-attack in the West since the Allied breakout from Normandy. The plan called Wacht am Rhein ("Watch on the Rhine") was to attack through the Ardennes and swing north to Antwerp, splitting the American and British armies. The attack started on 16 December in what became known as the Battle of the Bulge. Defending the Ardennes were troops of the US First Army. Initial successes in bad weather, which gave them cover from the Allied air forces, resulted in a German penetration of over 80 km (50 mi) to within less than 16 km (10 mi) of the Meuse. Having been taken by surprise, the Allies regrouped and the Germans were stopped by a combined air and land counter-attack which eventually pushed them back to their starting points by 25 January 1945.

The Germans launched a second, smaller offensive (Nordwind) into Alsace on 1 January 1945. Aiming to recapture Strasbourg, the Germans attacked the 6th Army Group at multiple points. Because the Allied lines had become severely stretched in response to the crisis in the Ardennes, holding and throwing back the Nordwind offensive was a costly affair that lasted almost four weeks. The culmination of Allied counter-attacks restored the front line to the area of the German border and collapsed the Colmar Pocket.

=== Invasion of Germany ===
Canadian soldier looks at a warning sign on the German border

In January 1945 the German bridgehead over the river Roer between Heinsberg and Roermond was cleared during Operation Blackcock. This was followed by a pincer movement of the First Canadian Army in Operation Veritable advancing from the Nijmegen area of the Netherlands, and the US Ninth Army crossing the Roer in Operation Grenade. Veritable and Grenade were planned to start on 8 February 1945, but Grenade was delayed by two weeks when the Germans flooded the Roer valley by destroying the gates of the Rur Dam upstream. Field Marshal Gerd von Rundstedt requested permission to withdraw east behind the Rhine, arguing that further resistance would only delay the inevitable, but was ordered by Hitler to fight where his forces stood.

By the time the water had subsided and the US Ninth Army was able to cross the Roer on 23 February, other Allied forces were also close to the Rhine's west bank. Von Rundstedt's divisions, which had remained on the west bank, were cut to pieces in the 'Battle of the Rhineland' – 280,000 men were taken prisoner. With a large number of men captured, the stubborn German resistance during the Allied campaign to reach the Rhine in February and March 1945 had been costly. Total losses reached an estimated 400,000 men. By the time they prepared to cross the Rhine in late March, the Western Allies had taken 1,300,000 German soldiers prisoner in western Europe. (Note: 2,055,575 German soldiers surrendered between D-Day and 16 April 1945, 755,573 German soldiers surrendered between 1 and 16 April, which means that 1,300,002 German soldiers surrendered to the Western Allies between D-Day and the end of March 1945.)

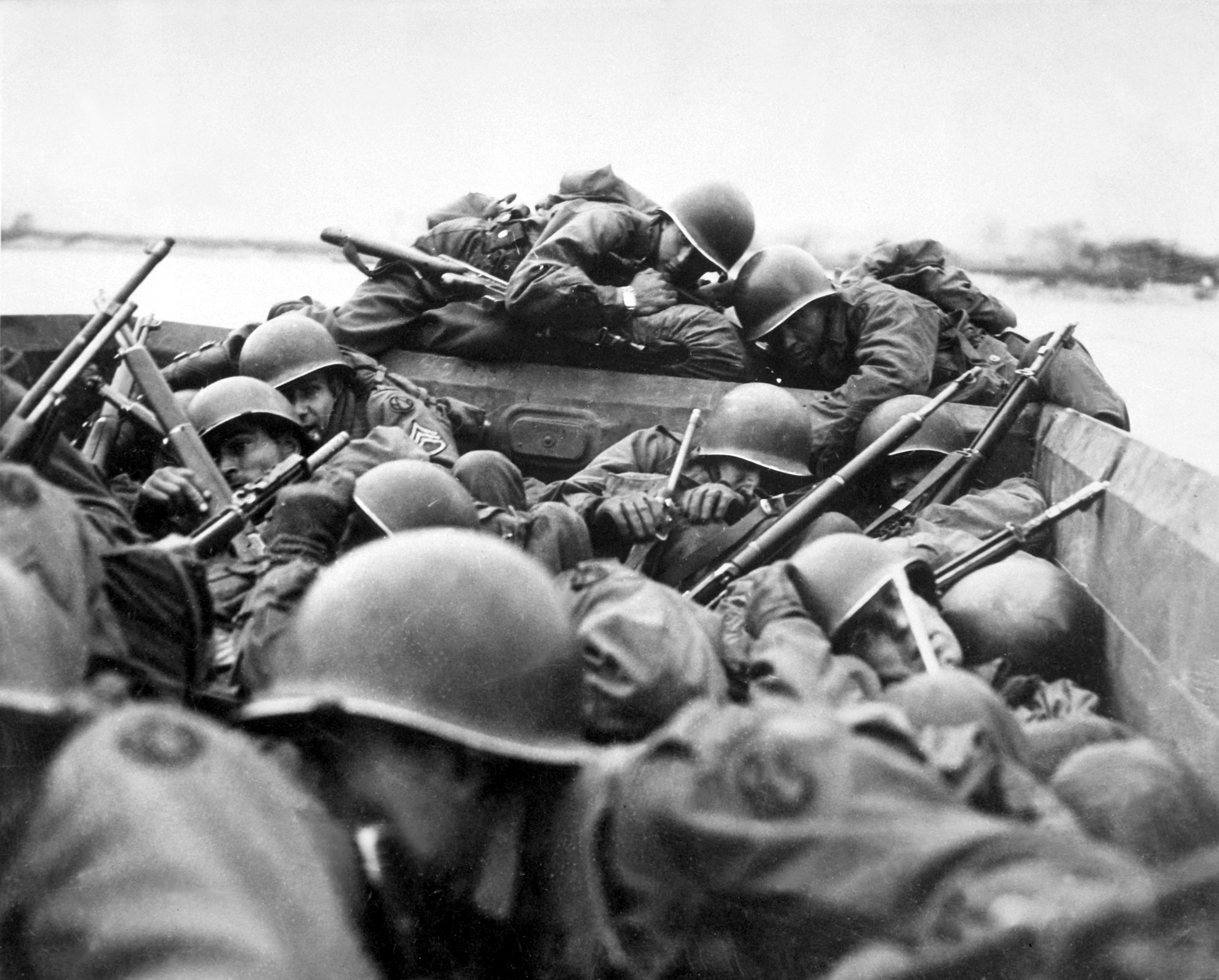
US soldiers cross the Rhine river in assault boats.

The crossing of the Rhine was achieved at four points:

- One was an opportunity taken by US forces when the Germans failed to blow up the Ludendorff bridge at Remagen. Bradley and his subordinates quickly exploited the Remagen crossing made on 7 March and expanded the bridgehead into a full-scale crossing.
- Bradley told General Patton whose U.S. Third Army had been fighting through the Palatinate, to "take the Rhine on the run". The Third Army did just that on the night of 22 March, crossing the river with a hasty assault south of Mainz at Oppenheim.
- In the North Operation Plunder was the name given to the assault crossing of the Rhine at Rees and Wesel by the British 21st Army Group on the night of 23 March. It included the largest airborne operation in history, which was codenamed Operation Varsity. At the point the British crossed the river, it is twice as wide, with a far higher volume of water, as the points where the Americans crossed and Montgomery decided it could only be crossed with a carefully planned operation.
- In the Allied 6th Army Group area, the US Seventh Army assaulted across the Rhine in the area between Mannheim and Worms on 26 March.
- A fifth crossing on a much smaller scale was later achieved by the French First Army at Speyer.

Once the Allies had crossed the Rhine, the British fanned out northeast towards Hamburg crossing the river Elbe and on towards Denmark and the Baltic. British forces captured Bremen on 26 April after a week of combat. British and Canadian paratroopers reached the Baltic city of Wismar just ahead of Soviet forces on 2 May. The US Ninth Army, which had remained under British command since the battle of the Bulge, went south as the northern pincer of the Ruhr encirclement as well as pushing elements east. XIX Corps of the Ninth Army captured Magdeburg on 18 April and the US XIII Corps to the north occupied Stendal.

The US 12th Army Group fanned out, and the First Army went north as the southern pincer of the Ruhr encirclement. On 4 April the encirclement was completed and the Ninth Army reverted to the command of Bradley's 12th Army Group. The German Army Group B commanded by Field Marshal Walther Model was trapped in the Ruhr Pocket and 300,000 soldiers became POWs. The Ninth and First American armies then turned east and pushed to the Elbe river by mid-April. During the push east, the cities of Frankfurt am Main, Kassel, Magdeburg, Halle and Leipzig were strongly defended by ad hoc German garrisons made up of regular troops, Flak units, Volkssturm and armed Nazi Party auxiliaries. Generals Eisenhower and Bradley concluded that pushing beyond the Elbe made no sense since eastern Germany was destined in any case to be occupied by the Red Army. The First and Ninth Armies stopped along the Elbe and Mulde rivers, making contact with Soviet forces near the Elbe in late April. The US Third Army had fanned out to the east into western Czechoslovakia and southeast into eastern Bavaria and northern Austria. By V-E Day, the US 12th Army Group was a force of four armies (First, Third, Ninth and Fifteenth) that numbered over 1.3 million men.

=== Final moves by Western Allies ===
General Eisenhower's Armies were facing resistance that varied from almost non-existent to fanatical (Note: Such as the battles for Kassel, Leipzig, and Magdeburg.) as they advanced toward Berlin, which was located 200 km (120 mi) from their positions in early April 1945. Britain's Prime Minister, Winston Churchill, urged Eisenhower to continue the advance toward Berlin by the 21st Army Group, under the command of Montgomery with the intention of capturing the city. Even Patton agreed with Churchill that he should order the attack on the city since Montgomery's troops could reach Berlin within three days. The British and Americans contemplated an airborne operation before the attack. In Operation Eclipse, the 17th Airborne Division, 82nd Airborne Division, 101st Airborne Division, and a British brigade were to seize the Tempelhof, Rangsdorf, Gatow, Staaken, and Oranienburg airfields. In Berlin, the Reichsbanner resistance organization identified possible drop zones for Allied paratroopers and planned to guide them past German defenses into the city.

After Bradley warned that capturing a city located in a region that the Soviets had already received at the Yalta Conference might cost 100,000 casualties, by 15 April Eisenhower ordered all armies to halt when they reached the Elbe and Mulde Rivers, thus immobilizing these spearheads while the war continued for three more weeks. 21st Army Group was then instead ordered to move northeast toward Bremen and Hamburg. While the U.S. Ninth and First Armies held their ground from Magdeburg through Leipzig to western Czechoslovakia, Eisenhower ordered three Allied field armies (1st French, and the U.S. Seventh and Third Armies) into southeastern Germany and Austria. Advancing from northern Italy, the British Eighth Army (Note: Ultimately under the command of Field Marshal Harold Alexander, the supreme commander of the Mediterranean, not Eisenhower.) pushed to the borders of Yugoslavia to defeat the remaining Wehrmacht elements there. This later caused some friction with the Yugoslav forces, notably around Trieste.

=== End of the Third Reich ===
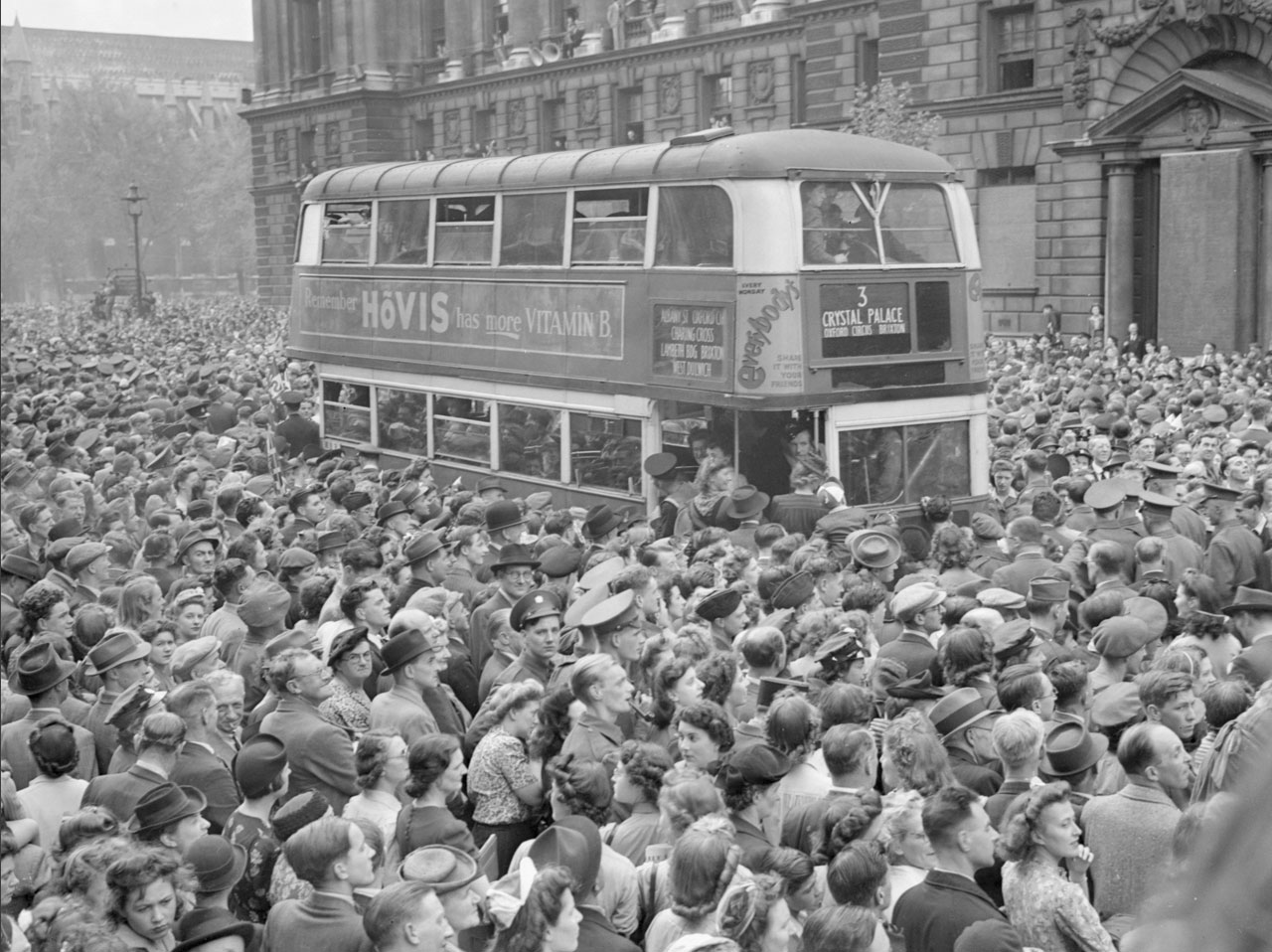
People gathered in Whitehall to hear Winston Churchill's victory speech and celebrate Victory in Europe, 8 May 1945.

The US 6th Army Group fanned out to the southwest, passing to the east of Switzerland through Bavaria and into Austria and northern Italy. The Black Forest and Baden were overrun by the French First Army. Determined stands were made in April by German forces at Heilbronn, Nuremberg, and Munich but were overcome after several days. Elements of the US 3rd Infantry Division were the first Allied troops to arrive at Berchtesgaden, which they secured, while the French 2nd Armoured Division seized the Berghof (Hitler's Alpine residence) on 4 May 1945. German Army Group G surrendered to US forces at Haar, in Bavaria, on 5 May. Field Marshal Montgomery took the German military surrender of all German forces in The Netherlands, northwest Germany and Denmark on Lüneburg Heath, an area between the cities of Hamburg, Hanover and Bremen, on 4 May 1945. As the operational commander of some of these forces was Grand Admiral Karl Dönitz, the new Reichspräsident (head of state) of the Third Reich this signaled that the European war was over.

On 7 May at his headquarters in Rheims, Eisenhower took the unconditional surrender of all German forces to the western Allies and the Soviet Union, from the German Chief-of-Staff, General Alfred Jodl, who signed the first general instrument of surrender at 0241 hours. General Franz Böhme announced the unconditional surrender of German troops in Norway. Operations ceased at 23:01 hours Central European time (CET) on 8 May. On that same day Field Marshal Wilhelm Keitel, as head of OKW and Jodl's superior, was brought to Marshal Georgy Zhukov in Karlshorst and signed another instrument of surrender that was essentially identical to that signed in Rheims with two minor additions requested by the Soviets.

== Casualties ==
=== Allied ===
The Allies suffered: 1,093,000 killed/wounded/missing. Apart from about 2 million prisoners, mostly French. The United States suffered the highest losses: 147,783 killed and missing, 365,086 wounded, 73,759 captured. France suffered relatively high losses: 132,000 killed or missing, about 300,000 wounded, and 1,454,730 taken prisoner.. Total combat casualties suffered by British armed forces on the Western Front 50,000 killed and missing, 120,000 wounded. The rest of the allied countries lost 284,000 killed, wounded and captured (among them 24,000 killed and missing).

=== Axis ===
German losses are much more difficult to deal with, as different sources claim conflicting information. According to George Marshall, the Germans lost 263,000 killed. German historian Rüdger Overmans points to other numbers: 339,000 killed and missing on the Western Front until 31 December 1944. He also claims that in the "final battles" from January to May 1945, Germany lost 1,230,000 killed and missing, of which 1/3 on the Western Front. According to Rüdiger Overmans, German losses totalled 750,000 killed. Due to low morale towards the end of the war, the Germans often surrendered. Unlike their colleagues on the Eastern Front and their Japanese colleagues, the Wehrmacht did not fight to the last in the defensive battles on the Western Front in 1944–1945 and for the most part surrendered when the defeat was obvious. 7,614,790 were held in POW camps by early June 1945 (including 3,404,950 who were disarmed following the surrender of Germany).

== See also ==
- Allies at War by Tim Bouverie (2025)
- The Second World War by Antony Beevor (2012).
- Inferno: The World at War, 1939-1945 by Max Hastings (2011).
- The Storm of War by Andrew Roberts (2009).
