= Allies at War =

Book by Tim Bouverie about World War II diplomacy among the big three Allied powers

- Book cover (US edition)
- Author: Tim Bouverie
- Audio read by: Tim Bouverie
- Language: English
- Subject: World War II, Diplomacy, International Relations, Franklin D. Roosevelt, Winston Churchill, Joseph Stalin
- Genre: Non-fiction, History
- Publisher: The Bodley Head
- Publication date: 17 April 2025
- Publication place: United Kingdom
- Media type: Hardcover, Kindle, Audiobook
- Pages: 688pp. (Hardcover, first edition)
- ISBN: 9781847926227
- Website: Allies at War

Allies at War, subtitled The Politics of Defeating Hitler (UK edition) or How the Struggles Between the Allied Powers Shaped the War and the World (US edition), is a 2025 non-fiction book by Tim Bouverie, published by The Bodley Head.

== Background ==
Tim Bouverie is a British historian. He previously released Appeasing Hitler: Chamberlain, Churchill and the Road to War in 2019, also about lead-up to the Second World War." The book was a Sunday Times' Bestseller and was shortlisted for the Orwell Prize. He was educated at Bryanston School and Christ Church, Oxford, where he read history.

== Content ==
The book examines the complex political relationships among the Allied powers during the Second World War. It focuses on the diplomatic negotiations, tensions, and compromises between the leaders of the Western Allies (primarily the United States and the United Kingdom) and the Soviet Union, sometimes referred to as "The Big Three". The author highlights conflicts, compromises, and evolving relationships, showing their wartime cooperation was one of mutual suspicion and competing agendas. Starting with the Anglo-French alliance in 1939, the book offers insights into wartime agreements and the political dynamics which shaped the alliance against Nazi Germany and its allies. It emphasises the pragmatism involved in maintaining the alliance throughout the war.

== Reception ==
The book was widely praised by reviewers, with Adam Sisman describing it as "revelatory" in The Guardian, "enthralling and authoritative" by Michael F. Bishop in the Wall Street Journal, "meticulous, scholarly and highly enjoyable" by Caroline Moorehead in The Spectator, "masterful" by The Economist and 'impeccably researched, elegantly written and compellingly argued' by Saul David in The Times. Richard J. Evans described it as "a major work of original history that is a pleasure to read...a masterpiece."

In March 2026, Allies at War won for the Duff Cooper Prize.

The book was featured in an official photograph released by Israel's Prime Minister's Office (PMO), showing Israeli Prime Minister Benjamin Netanyahu speaking with US President Donald Trump as Israel and the United States launched joint strikes against Iran on 28 February 2026. The book was on Netanyahu's desk.

=== Reviews ===
- Bishop, Michael F. (14 June 2025). "'Allies at War' Review: Partners Against the Axis". The Wall Street Journal.
- David, Saul (11 April 2025). "Allies at War by Tim Bouverie: Review". The Times.
- Miskimon, Christopher (2025). "Tim Bouverie's Allies at War". Warfare History Network.
- Roberts, Andrew (24 March 2025). "Allies at War by Tim Bouverie: 5-star review". The Telegraph.
- Sisman, Adam (8 April 2025). "Allies at War by Tim Bouverie review – study of Second World War pacts is full of surprises". The Guardian.
- Waldegrave, William (11 April 2025). "Tim Bouverie's Allies at War recounts the fall-outs and reconciliations of The Big Three with sensitivity and wit". The Independent.
- Staff review (1 May 2025). "Allies at War: A Revelatory Account of the Second World War". The Week.
