= Johannes Schulz =

- Born: 23 October 1892
- Died: 27 November 1943 (aged 51); Kryvyi Rih, Reichskommissariat Ukraine
- Military career
- Allegiance: German Empire; Weimar Republic; Nazi Germany
- Branch: Army
- Rank: Generalmajor (Posthumously)
- Commands: 9th Panzer Division
- Conflicts: World War II: Lower Dnieper Offensive †
- Awards: Knight's Cross of the Iron Cross

Johannes Schulz (23 October 1892 – 27 November 1943) served in the army of the German Empire and was a German officer in the Wehrmacht during World War II. During World War II he briefly commanded the 9th Panzer Division. He was also a recipient of the Knight's Cross of the Iron Cross of Nazi Germany.

== Biography ==
Born in 1892, Schulz entered the army of Imperial Germany as an engineer at the age of 18. He served in World War I and was among the personnel retained in the postwar Reichswehr (Imperial Defence). He was discharged in 1920 with the rank of Hauptmann (captain). After a period of time as a civilian, he returned to the military in 1934 by joining the Heer (Army) branch of the Wehrmacht, initially in his previous rank of Hauptmann. By 1938 he was commander of the 70th Engineer Battalion. The following year he was posted to the staff of the Oberkommando des Heeres (OKH), the Supreme High Command of the Heer. In March 1943, and now an Oberst (Colonel), he was given command of the 10th Panzergrenadier Regiment which was part of the 9th Panzer Division. While leading the regiment in September 1943, he was awarded the Knight's Cross of the Iron Cross.

Following the wounding of the 9th Panzer Division's commander, Erwin Jollasse, in October 1943, Schulz took over as divisional commander. His time leading the division was brief as he was killed on the 27th of November 1943 in the area north of Kryvyi Rih in the course of the Soviet Army's Lower Dnieper Offensive. He was posthumously promoted to Generalmajor (Major General).

Military offices
Preceded by Generalleutnant Erwin Jollasse	Commander of 9th Panzer Division; 20 October 1943 - 27 November 1943	Succeeded by Oberst Max Sperling
