= Max Sperling =

- Born: 4 September 1905; Kulm, West Prussia, German Empire (now Chełmno, Poland)
- Died: 6 June 1984 (aged 79); Heidelberg, Baden-Württemberg, West Germany
- Military career
- Allegiance: Weimar Republic; Nazi Germany; West Germany
- Branch: Army; Bundeswehr
- Service years: 1924–45; 1956–64
- Rank: Oberst (Wehrmacht); Oberst (Bundeswehr)
- Commands: 9th Panzer Division
- Conflicts: World War II
- Awards: Knight's Cross of the Iron Cross

Max Sperling (4 September 1905 – 6 June 1984) was a German officer in the Wehrmacht during World War II who briefly commanded the 9th Panzer Division. He was a recipient of the Knight's Cross of the Iron Cross of Nazi Germany.

== Awards and decorations ==
- Knight's Cross of the Iron Cross on 6 April 1944 as Major and commander of Panzergrenadier-Regiment 11

Military offices
Preceded by Generalmajor Dr. Johannes Schulz	Commander of 9. Panzer-Division; 27 November 1943 – 28 November 1943	Succeeded by Generalleutnant Erwin Jollasse
Preceded by Generalleutnant Erwin Jollasse	Commander of 9. Panzer-Division; 10 August 1944 – 2 September 1944	Succeeded by Generalmajor Gerhard Müller
