= Harald Freiherr von Elverfeldt =

German general (1900–1945)

- Born: 6 February 1900; Hildesheim, German Empire
- Died: 6 March 1945 (aged 45); Cologne, Nazi Germany
- Military career
- Allegiance: German Empire (to 1918); Weimar Republic (to 1933); Nazi Germany
- Branch: Army (Wehrmacht)
- Service years: 1918–1945
- Rank: Generalmajor; Generalleutnant (Posthumously)
- Commands: 9th Panzer Division
- Conflicts: World War I World War II
- Awards: Knight's Cross of the Iron Cross with Oak Leaves

Harald Freiherr von Elverfeldt (6 February 1900 – 6 March 1945) was a German general in the Wehrmacht of Nazi Germany during World War II who commanded the 9th Panzer Division. He was a recipient of the Knight's Cross of the Iron Cross with Oak Leaves.

Throughout the 1942 and early 1943, Elverfeldt participated in several rear security operation in Belarus operations, Operation Eisvogel (Operation Kingfisher) and Operation Zigeunerbaron (Operation Gypsy Baron). In September 1943 he was promoted to the rank of Generalmajor and served in the Crimea. In September 1944, after the 9th Panzer Division had fought in Normandy, Harald von Elverfeldt was given command of the division and commanded it until December 28, 1944, and then again from February 1945 until he was killed in action in March 1945 whilst defending Cologne. Elverfeldt was awarded the Knight's Cross of the Iron Cross on 9 December 1944, and was posthumously awarded Oak Leaves on 23 March 1945, along with a promotion to Generalleutnant.

== Decorations ==
- Iron Cross (1914) 2nd Class (17 April 1919)
- Honour Cross of the World War 1914/1918 (21 December 1934)
- Clasp to the Iron Cross (1939) 2nd Class (29 September 1939) & 1st Class (8 October 1939)
- German Cross in Gold on 16 March 1942 as Oberstleutnant im Generalstab (in the General Staff) of General-Kommando LVI. Armeekorps
- Knight's Cross of the Iron Cross with Oak Leaves
  - Knight's Cross on 9 December 1944 as Generalmajor and leader of the 9th Panzer-Division
  - 801st Oak Leaves on 23 March 1945 as Generalleutnant and commander of the 9th Panzer-Division

Military offices
Preceded by Generalmajor Gerhard Müller	Commander of 9th Panzer Division; 16 September 1944 – 28 December 1944	Succeeded by Generalmajor Friedrich Wilhelm von Mellenthin
Preceded by Generalmajor Friedrich Wilhelm von Mellenthin	Commander of 9th Panzer Division; February 1945 – 6 March 1945	Succeeded by Oberst Helmut Zollenkopf
