= 9th Panzer Division (Wehrmacht) =

German army division during World War II

- 9. Panzer-Division; — 9. Pz.Div. —
- (US Army Map Symbol: Panzer Division)
- Active: 3 January 1940 – 8 May 1945
- Country: Nazi Germany
- Branch: German Army
- Type: Panzer
- Role: Armoured warfare
- Size: Division
- Part of: Wehrmacht
- Garrison/HQ: Wehrkreis XVII: Vienna
- Engagements: World War II; Battle of the Netherlands; Operation Barbarossa; Operation Mars; Case Blue; Battle of Kursk; Battle of the Dnieper; Dnieper–Carpathian offensive; Operation Overlord; Operation Market Garden; Battle of the Bulge; Battle of Remagen; Ruhr pocket

Insignia
- Fall 1940

The 9th Panzer Division was a panzer division of the German Army during World War II. It came into existence after 4th Light Division was reorganized in January 1940. The division was headquartered in Vienna, in the German military district Wehrkreis XVII.

Originally raised from Austrian forces annexed into Germany before the war, the 9th Panzer Division was part of most of the German Army's early Blitzkrieg attacks into western Europe. Sweeping east, the division was then a component of Operation Barbarossa, the German attack on the Soviet Union; it was badly mauled at the Battle of Kursk.

Returning to France to rebuild in 1944, the division was rushed to counter Operation Overlord. It was destroyed several successive times by British and American forces as the German Army was pushed back across Europe. The division suffered massive casualties in armor and personnel until it finally collapsed in March 1945. The division's few survivors were pushed into the Ruhr Pocket where they surrendered to the Allies at the end of the war.

== Organization ==
In 1942, the division was organized around three regiments. Its tanks were organized into the 33rd Panzer Regiment, which was supported by two regiments of panzergrenadiers, or mechanized infantry. These were the 10th Panzer Grenadier Regiment and the 11th Panzer Grenadier Regiment. Also assigned to the division were the 102nd Panzer Artillery Regiment, the 9th Motorcycle Battalion, the 9th Panzer Reconnaissance Battalion, the 50th Panzer Jager Battalion, the 86th Panzer Pionier Battalion, the 81st Panzer Signal Battalion, the 287th Army Anti-Aircraft Battalion, and the 60th Panzer Divisional Supply Troops.

== History ==
Following the Anschluss annexation of Austria in 1938, the 4th Light Division was formed in Vienna after converting a mobile division of the Bundesheer (the Austrian Army) in April of that year. It initially consisted of the 33rd Panzer Battalion, the 102nd Motorized Artillery Regiment, and the 10th and 11th Motorized Cavalry Regiments. In 1939, it fought in the Invasion of Poland, on the right flank of Army Group South, attacking out of Slovakia, pushing over the San River on 10 September and capturing Krakowiec on 12 September. It then moved to establish a bridgehead over the Bug River at Krylow on 14 September. The division then turned west, blocking the escape of several units of the Polish Army. In the process the division took tens of thousands of prisoners. On 24 October, the division departed Salzberg, returning to Vienna by train. That winter, it was converted to the 9th Panzer Division and formally redesignated on 3 January 1940. It consisted of the 9th Rifle Brigade, the 33rd Panzer Battalion, the 102nd Panzer Artillery Regiment, and several other divisional units.

=== Early campaigns ===
Following a further reorganization increasing its strength to two tank battalions and three motorised infantry regiments, the division was sent to the Western Front to participate in the Battle of the Netherlands starting on 10 May 1940. Part of the 18th Army, which defeated The Netherlands in a grueling five days, 9th Panzer Division played an essential role in the German strategy. The division was the only German mechanized force allocated to 18th Army and was intended primarily to link up with airborne forces landed near Rotterdam and The Hague. On 12 May, the division was launched in the south of The Netherlands to exploit a breakthrough by German infantry divisions, quickly advancing to the Moerdijk bridges, which had been captured by Student's paratroopers. Before that, near Breda, the division split up, sending one battalion north over the Moerdijk bridges to try and enter the Dutch National Redoubt, Fortress Holland. On 13 May, however, during its first actual fighting of the campaign, the battalion suffered considerable losses in a failed assault on the centre of Dordrecht.

On 14 May, the battalion stood ready to assault Rotterdam, but the Dutch surrendered the same day after a carpet bombing of that city's civilian centre by the Luftwaffe. The other part of the division went south, after the retreating French 7th Army and the Belgian Army, towards Antwerp and Dunkirk. Parts of 9th Panzer Division, along with SS Leibstandarte, were tasked by Adolf Hitler to conduct an improvised triumphal march through the streets of Amsterdam to underscore the German victory over the Netherlands.

Following the evacuation of Dunkirk, 9th Panzer Division was assigned to Panzer Group Guderian and participated in the Battle of France. During this stage it was under the command of XXXIX Motorized Corps. It pushed through the Weygand Line towards Paris, crossing the Oise River, Aisne River, Marne River and Loire River, taking thousands of prisoners in the process. By the time of the French surrender, the 9th Panzer Division was in Lyon. During the Western campaign, the division was credited with covering more ground than any other German division.

The division returned to Vienna in July 1940. There, it continued to reorganize and grow, adopting the organization that it kept for most of the war with one tank regiment, two panzergrenadier regiments and one artillery regiment. In September, it was sent to Poland with the XL Panzer Corps.

In the spring of 1941, 9th Panzer Division participated in the Balkans Campaign. It was shipped to Romania and was made the armored spearhead of the 12th Army. It managed some blitzkrieg tactics through the Balkans, separating the Greek Army from the Royal Yugoslav Army, then attacking into Yugoslavia itself. As part of the 12th Army, the 9th Panzer Division pushed back the main British Army, Greek and Australian Army forces Once these armies were in retreat, the division was sent to Romania in preparation for Operation Barbarossa, the invasion of the Soviet Union.

=== Operation Barbarossa ===
Once Operation Barbarossa was launched, the 9th Panzer Division, part of XIV Panzer Corps of the Army Group South, pushed through Ukraine on 28 June, heading to Kiev after the Battle of Brody (1941). The division broke through the Stalin Line on 7 July, took part in the encirclement of Uman, and captured Krivoy Rog and Nikopol on 17 August. The 9th Panzer Division then captured the Dnieper River Dam at Zaporizhia on 25 August. From there, it was made the spearhead of Panzer Group Kleist, driving to Kiev from the south while Panzer Group Guderian drove behind the city from the north. The two groups linked up on 15 September, encircling five field armies of the Soviet Army. The division was part of the force that captured 667,000 Soviet prisoners and 900 tanks in the city.

Following the capture of Kiev, the 9th Panzer Division was made a part of Panzer Group Guderian for the advance on Moscow. The division then took part in the encirclement of Bryansk and, despite delays due to terrain, weather and Red Army resistance, captured Kursk on 2 November. It was halted near the Kursk Oblast settlement of Tim. From there, the division held a sector near Shchigry on the southern sector, facing the Soviet winter offensives of 1941 and 1942. The division remained on this sector until Soviet attacks abated in March 1942.

=== Case Blue ===
During Soviet offensive from the bridgehead north Voronezh on the west bank of the Don River against the German 7th Corps, the 9th Panzer Division was released from 2nd Army reserves to lead a counterattack and stabilize the front of the 7th Corps. On the evening the 9th Panzer Division counterattacked to stabilize the front of the 387th Infantry Division to open a relief of the encircled 542nd Infantry Regiment. The next day, July 24, 1942, the 9th Panzer Division along with the 385th Infantry Division, began an offensive aimed towards Lomovo to outflank Soviet “Group Chibisov” consisting of the 1st and 2nd Tank Corps. Bitter fighting ensued over the course of the next days with the commanding general, Johannes Bäßler, was seriously wounded and relieved of command. Heinrich-Hermann von Hülsen, commander of the 9th Panzer Grenadier Regiment then assumed command. The fighting to stabilize the front German northern flank around Zemlyansk, northwest of Voronezh continued until July 29, 1942 when the front of the 7th Corps was stabilized and the 9th Panzer Division was released.

=== Operation Mars ===
The 9th Panzer Division, commanded by General Walter Scheller, fought in the Second Rzhev-Sychyovka Offensive Operation also referred to as Operation Mars.

After the initial Soviet breakthrough by the Soviet 20th Army on November 26, the 9th Panzer Division was ordered to form two kampfgruppen to attack up the Rzhev-Sychevka road to stem the advance of Soviet 20th Army to the west.

=== Operation Citadel ===
During a lull in hostilities in early 1943, the division was again reorganized and reequipped, sent to Orel and transferred to Army Group Center, where it participated in Operation Citadel and the Battle of Kursk in the summer of that year as a part of XLVII Panzer Corps, 9th Army. Fighting alongside the 2nd, 4th and 20th Panzer divisions and the 6th Infantry Division, it tried unsuccessfully to break through the Soviet defensive belt. The division fought on the front for an extended period of time, suffering heavy casualties. In one engagement, the division lost 70 tanks to Soviet Ilyushin Il-2 aircraft in just 20 minutes. After an advance of only 15 km and suffering heavy casualties, it abandoned its attempt to reach Kursk.

Following the German defeat at Kursk, the 9th Panzer Division was heavily engaged in the German retreat to the Mius-Front, a line of German fortifications along the Mius River. It covered the retreat of the 2nd Panzer Army and the 9th Army, north of Orel and Kirov, then fought in a series of battles east of Bryansk at the end of August. The division participated in fights at Stalino, Zaporozhye, Odessa, and Dnieper.

During the fights of late 1943 and early 1944 it suffered mounting losses, and by January 1944 it was reduced to 13 tanks (on 20 November 1943: 6 operational tanks out of 30 total; the fewest operational tanks out of any Army Group South panzer division) and substantially under-strength infantry and artillery formations. It continued a slow retreat across the Ingulez and the Ingul, until it was pulled out of the fighting in April.

=== Western Front ===
The division was subsequently sent to Nimes, France, to rebuild, as many divisions mauled on the Eastern Front were. On 1 May 1944, it absorbed men and tanks of the 155th Reserve Panzer Division to return to its full strength. During this absorption it received 31 Panzer IIIs, 74 Panzer IVs, 20 assault guns, 15 Panther tanks and 200 other vehicles. The division then conducted training exercises up until June of that year. It was reassigned to an area on the Rhone River for a time. It was in better shape than many of the other divisions in the area, which were refitting, forming, or lacked enough vehicles to move effectively.

Following the D-Day landings conducted by the Allies, the division was rushed to northern France to participate in the Battle of Normandy. At this time, its strength was up to 150 tanks and assault guns and 12,768 men. The division was sent to Avignon, before being sent to support the collapsing 7th Army in Normandy. The division arrived just as the army was encircled by American, French, British, and Canadian forces at Falaise. In the subsequent furious battle, the division was almost completely destroyed escaping the Falaise Pocket. By late August, its strength was at around 1,500 organized in one infantry battalion, one artillery battalion, and 5 tanks. However, it continued to cover the escape of Army Group G from Normandy.

Following its near-destruction at Falaise, the division remained in the German Siegfried Line where it fought several engagements, most notably the Battle of Aachen. Over the next month, it lost over 1,000 men, two-thirds of its combat strength. At the end of September 1944, the 9th Panzer Division was sent into Army Group B's reserve and rehabilitated. It was given 11,000 more replacements and 178 armored vehicles, including 50 Panther tanks. It was to reinforce German units countering Operation Market Garden, but by the time it arrived at Arnhem, the Allied forces had been pushed back. The 9th Panzer Division was returned to the line around Geilenkirchen and Aachen, where it launched a spoiling attack against US forces in the Peel Marshes in November, but only succeeded in losing 30 tanks in the process. It then reassembled west of the Rur River with a strength of 10,000 men, 28 Panther tanks and 14 Panzer IV tanks. Along with elements of the 15th Panzer Grenadier Division, 9th Panzer fought a bitter six-day battle with the U.S. 2nd Armored Division in the Puffendorf-Immendorf sector, knocking out 76 tanks and inflicting 1,300 casualties. Following this, the division was sent into the OKW reserve. It continued fighting to slow the progress of the U.S. First Army pushing from the west, destroying its 2,325th enemy tank near Geilenkirchen.

In December 1944, 9th Panzer was assigned to XLVII Panzer Corps again as part of the 5th Panzer Army, Army Group B and was one of the units participating in the Battle of the Bulge. At this time sPzAbt 301 (equipped with Tiger I tanks) was attached to the division. The Corps was part of the central attack, pushing back the First United States Army. The division initially advanced quickly, but once the tide of the campaign turned in the Allies' favor, the division took extreme losses once again as Adolf Hitler refused to allow the German forces in the campaign to retreat in a timely manner. It was eventually pulled back to the German lines.

In early 1945, the division engaged the Allied in fighting around the Eifel mountain range. It also participated in fighting around the Erft River in February, where its armored force was reduced to 29 tanks and 16 assault guns. Late in the month, it launched an attack on the Allied Remagen Bridgehead over the Rhine River, which failed to reach the Remagen Bridge. By the end of this fight, the division consisted of only 600 men and 15 tanks.

=== Destruction ===
The 9th Panzer Division's final combat assignment came in a battle near Cologne on 6 March, as a part of the battered LXXXI Corps, alongside the 363rd Volksgrenadier Division and the 3rd Panzergrenadier Division which were in equally poor shape, and the entire corps was barely the strength of one division. Facing them was the US 3rd Armored Division. The division attempted to defend the town from attack, but was unable to make progress against American forces.

After its unsuccessful attack, the shattered 9th Panzer Division was counterattacked by strong Allied forces. The division engaged the Americans in the city center of Cologne, but were quickly pushed back, and the divisional commander was killed. Remnants of the division attempted to flee across the Rhine River. In the fighting that followed, the weak formation finally collapsed. Most of the remains of the division were forced into the Ruhr Pocket, continuing to suffer staggering losses while holding lines on the south flank of Army Group B until they surrendered to American forces in April 1945. By this time, the demoralized soldiers of the division were entirely out of ammunition and gasoline, and remaining troops surrendering without a fight. The division continued to exist briefly afterward; Major Halle, the division's adjutant, escaped the Ruhr encirclement with a small battle group, and joined the 11th Army in the Harz Mountains. There, on 26 April 1945, German commanders of OB West disbanded the 9th Panzer Division, absorbing its survivors into other units.

== Commanding officers ==
The division was commanded by 11 people during its total history. This included General Friedrich Wilhelm von Mellenthin, who was acting division commander from December 1944 to February 1945 because General Harald Freiherr von Elverfeldt had been wounded in an Allied air attack.

Commander	Dates
Generalleutnant Alfred Ritter von Hubicki	3 January 1940 – 14 April 1942
Generalleutnant Johannes Bäßler	15 April 1942 – 26 July 1942
Generalmajor Heinrich-Hermann von Hülsen	27 July 1942 – 3 August 1942
Generalleutnant Walter Scheller	4 August 1942 – 21 July 1943
Generalleutnant Erwin Jollasse	22 July 1943 – 20 October 1943
Generalmajor Dr. Johannes Schulz	20 October 1943 – 27 November 1943
Oberst Max Sperling	27 November 1943 – 28 November 1943
Generalleutnant Erwin Jollasse	28 November 1943 – 10 August 1944
Oberst Max Sperling	10 August 1944 – 2 September 1944
Generalmajor Gerhard Müller	3 September 1944 – 16 September 1944
Generalleutnant Harald Freiherr von Elverfeldt	16 September 1944 – 28 December 1944
Generalmajor Friedrich Wilhelm von Mellenthin	28 December 1944 – February 1945
Generalleutnant Harald Freiherr von Elverfeldt	February 1945–6 March 1945
Oberst Helmut Zollenkopf	6 March 1945 – 18 April 1945

== See also ==
- Greatest Tank Battles. Season 2, Episode 7 tells the story of Ludwig Bauer, a tanker of the 9th Panzer division.

== Sources ==
- Holmes, Richard (2004). The D-Day Experience: From the Invasion to the Liberation of Paris. Andrews McMeel Publishing. ISBN 978-0-7407-4509-6.
- Mitcham, Samuel W. (2006). The Panzer Legions: A Guide to the German Army Tank Divisions of World War II and Their Commanders. Stackpole Books. ISBN 978-0-8117-3353-3.
- Mitcham, Samuel W. (2007). German Order of Battle Volume Three: Panzer, Panzer Grenadier, and Waffen SS Divisions in WWII. Stackpole Books. ISBN 978-0-8117-3438-7.
- Ripley, Tim (2003). The Wehrmacht: The German Army in World War II, 1939–1945. Routledge. ISBN 978-1-57958-312-5.
- Zumbro, Derek S. (2006). Battle for the Ruhr: The German Army's Final Defeat in the West. University Press of Kansas. ISBN 978-0-7006-1490-5.
- Sdvizhkov, Igor' (2017). Confronting Case Blue: Briansk Front's Attempt to Derail the German Drive to the Caucasus, July 1942. Helion. ISBN 978-1-911096-43-6.
