= Friedrich von Mellenthin =

German general during World War II

- Born: August 30, 1904; Breslau, German Empire
- Died: June 28, 1997 (aged 92); Johannesburg, South Africa
- Military career
- Allegiance: Weimar Republic; Nazi Germany
- Branch: Reichswehr; German Army
- Service years: 1924–1945
- Rank: Generalmajor
- Units: III Army Corps; Second Army; Afrika Korps; XLVIII Panzer Corps; Army Group G 5th Panzer Army
- Commands: 9th Panzer Division
- Conflicts: See battles: World War II; Invasion of Poland; Battle of France; Balkans Campaign; First Battle of El Alamein; Second Battle of El Alamein; Battle of Stalingrad; Battle of Kursk; Battle of Kiev; Battle of the Bulge
- Other work: Author of Panzer Battles

Friedrich von Mellenthin (30 August 1904 – 28 June 1997) was a German general during World War II. A participant in most of the major campaigns of the war, he became known afterwards for his memoirs Panzer Battles, first published in 1956 and reprinted several times since then.

Mellenthin's works were part of the exculpatory memoirs genre that fed the post-war revisionist narrative, put forth by former Wehrmacht generals. Panzer Battles was instrumental in forming the misconceptions that influenced the U.S. view of Eastern Front military operations up to 1995, when Soviet archival sources became available to Western and Russian historians.

== Biography ==
Mellenthin was born in Breslau; his brother Horst von Mellenthin was also a World War II general. In 1924, Friedrich von Mellenthin enlisted in the Reichsheer; in 1932 he married Ingeborg von Aulock. He was assigned to the Prussian Military Academy in 1935. Between 1937 and June 1941, Mellenthin held several general staff positions in the Army; in June 1941, Mellenthin was posted to North Africa, where he served as a staff officer in the Afrika Korps until September 1942.

Until May 1944, Mellenthin served as chief of staff of the XXXXVIII Panzer Corps in the occupied Soviet Union, under General Hermann Balck, including during the Battle of Kursk, the Battle of Kiev, and the spring 1944 retreat through the western Ukraine. In September 1944, Mellenthin followed Balck to the 4th Panzer Army and then to Army Group G in eastern France. On 28 December, Mellenthin was given command of 9th Panzer Division, which was then engaged in the Battle of the Bulge. From March to May 1945 he was chief of staff of the 5th Panzer Army.

Mellenthin surrendered to the British Army on 3 May 1945 and spent two and a half years in an internment camp. After his release, Mellenthin emigrated to South Africa, founded Trek Airways, worked together with Luxair and represented Lufthansa in Africa from 1961 until 1969. He died in Johannesburg in 1997.

== Authorship and reception ==
Mellenthin's book Panzerschlachten, translated into English as Panzer Battles, documents Wehrmacht's campaigns that he participated in. The book was reprinted six times in the U.S. between 1956 and 1976 and continues to be popular among readers who romanticize the German war effort. The veracity of Mellenthin's Panzer Battles and other works has been called into question over the years. The historian Wolfram Wette lists Mellenthin in the group of German generals who authored apologetic, uncritical studies on World War II, alongside Ferdinand Heim, Kurt von Tippelskirch, Waldemar Erfurth and others.

Critics point out that Mellenthin tends to downplay Wehrmacht's failures while extolling the fighting qualities of the German soldier. The historians Ronald Smelser and Edward J. Davies have characterized Mellenthin's works as part of the "exculpatory memoirs" genre that fed the post-war revisionist narrative, alongside books by Erich von Manstein, Heinz Guderian, Hans Rudel and Hans von Luck. Mellenthin blames Wehrmacht's defeat solely on the Soviet advantages in men and materiel, describing the Red Army as a "ruthless enemy, possessed of immense and seemingly inexhaustible resources". As a result, according to Mellenthin, the "endless waves of men and tanks" eventually "submerged" the supposedly superior Wehrmacht.

Wehrmacht's adversaries on the Eastern Front are consistently depicted in derogatory and racial terms, including in a section dedicated to the "Psychology of the Russian Soldier". According to Mellenthin, "Russian soldier" is a "primitive being", characterised by "mental sluggishness" and lacking a "religious or moral balance". He describes them as "primitive" "Asiatics".

Panzer Battles was instrumental in forming the misconceptions which influenced the U.S. view of Eastern Front military operations up to 1995, when Soviet archival sources became available to Western and Russian historians. The historian Robert Citino notes the influential nature of Mellenthin's works in shaping the perceptions of the Red Army in the West as "a faceless and mindless horde" whose idea of military art was to "smash everything in its path through numbers, brute force and sheer size". Citino includes Panzer Battles among the German officers' memoirs that are "at best unreliable and at worst deliberately misleading".

== Works ==
- Panzer Battles: A Study of the Employment of Armor in the Second World War. First Ballantine Books Edition (1971). New York: Ballantine Books. ISBN 0-345-24440-0
- German Generals of World War II: As I Saw Them (1977). Norman: University of Oklahoma Press.
- R. H. S. Stolfi, E. Sobik: NATO Under Attack: Why the Western Alliance Can Fight Outnumbered and Win in Central Europe Without Nuclear Weapons. Duke Press Policy Studies, 1984.
- Schach dem Schicksal. Ein deutscher Generalstabsoffizier berichtet von seiner Herkunft, seinem Einsatz im 2. Weltkrieg und seinem beruflichen Neubeginn nach dem Kriege. In: Soldatenschicksale des 20. Jahrhunderts als Geschichtsquelle. Bd. 11, Osnabrück 1988, ISBN 3-7648-1729-1.

== See also ==
- Myth of the clean Wehrmacht

Military offices
Preceded by Generalleutnant Harald Freiherr von Elverfeldt	Commander of 9th Panzer Division; 28 December 1944 – February 1945	Succeeded by Generalleutnant Harald Freiherr von Elverfeldt
