= Erwin Jollasse =

- Born: 8 December 1892; Hamburg
- Died: 14 March 1987 (aged 95); Tutzing
- Military career
- Allegiance: Nazi Germany
- Branch: Army
- Service years: 1911–1919; 1933–1945
- Rank: Generalleutnant
- Commands: 9th Panzer Division; 344th Infantry Division
- Conflicts: World War II
- Awards: Knight's Cross of the Iron Cross

Erwin Jollasse (12 December 1892 – 8 March 1987) was a general in the Wehrmacht of Nazi Germany during World War II who commanded several divisions. He was a recipient of the Knight's Cross of the Iron Cross.

Jollasse took command of the 9th Panzer Division on 22 July 1943 and held it until he was wounded in October, he later resumed command in November and held it until 10 August 1944, when he was wounded again. In late 1944 he was declared fit for limited service and was given a desk job at the Inspectorate of Panzer Troops. In March 1945 he was named to replace Maj. Gen Rudolf Goltzsch as commander of the 344. Volksgrenadier Division in Czechoslovakia, a command he held until 30 April 1945, when he and twenty-five other men broke out of the Soviet encirclement and eluded the Red and US Armies until 8 June. He was released from prison on 30 June 1947 and died on 14 March 1987 in Tutzing.

== Decorations ==
- Knight's Cross of the Iron Cross on 2 November 1941 as Oberst and commander of Schützen-Regiment 52

Military offices
Preceded by Generalleutnant Walter Scheller	Commander of 9. Panzer-Division; 22 July 1943 – 20 October 1943	Succeeded by Generalmajor Dr. Johannes Schulz
Preceded by Oberst Max Sperling	Commander of 9. Panzer-Division; 28 November 1943 – 10 August 1944	Succeeded by Oberst Max Sperling
