= Appeasing Hitler =

2019 non-fiction book by Tim Bouverie

Appeasing Hitler: Chamberlain, Churchill and the Road to War
- First edition cover
- Author: Tim Bouverie
- Audio read by: John Sessions
- Language: English
- Subject: British appeasement of Adolf Hitler
- Publisher: The Bodley Head
- Publication date: 18 April 2019
- Publication place: United Kingdom
- Media type: Print (hardcover and paperback)
- Pages: 512
- ISBN: 978-1-84792-440-7 (hardcover)
- Dewey Decimal: 327.41043
- LC Class: DA47.2 .B685 2019

Appeasing Hitler: Chamberlain, Churchill and the Road to War, is a 2019 book by Tim Bouverie about the British policy of appeasement of Hitler in the 1930s.

Bouverie explains the policy as a product of the British response to the First World War. Given that an enormous percentage of Britain's fighting-age men had died in a war the purpose of which no one could perceive, Bouverie describes British pacifism as the explanation of Chamberlain's appeasement policy, since "The desire to avoid a Second World War was perhaps the most understandable and universal wish in history." Bouverie describes the antisemitism of the British ruling class as the secondary cause of Britain's reluctance to stand up to Hitler.

The book is a strong response to a number of recent works of historical revisionism that have painted Chamberlain as a "super-pragmatist", much maligned since his options were limited by widespread popular pacifism and also painting him as a man who cleverly used appeasement to gain time that would enable Britain to rearm.
