= Tim Bouverie =

British historian and former political journalist at Channel 4 News

- Born: Timothy Pleydell-Bouverie; June 1987 (age 39)
- Education: Christ Church, Oxford
- Occupation: Historian
- Relatives: Jacob Pleydell-Bouverie, 8th Earl of Radnor (grandfather); Ian Gilmour, Baron Gilmour of Craigmillar (grandfather)
- Family: Earl of Radnor, Pleydell-Bouverie

Timothy Pleydell-Bouverie (born June 1987) is a British historian and author.

== Early life and education ==
Bouverie was educated at Salisbury Cathedral School and Bryanston School before going to Christ Church, Oxford, to read history.

== Career ==
Between 2013 and 2017, Bouverie was a political journalist at Channel 4 News, working first for the television programme Dispatches and later as a producer for Michael Crick.

His first book, Appeasing Hitler: Chamberlain, Churchill and the Road to War, was published by Bodley Head in April 2019. A Sunday Times bestseller, it was described by Antony Beevor as an "astonishingly accomplished debut", by Margaret Macmillan as "a stunning debut by a major new narrative historian" and by the former Regius Professor of History at Oxford, Sir Michael Howard, as "sparkling and witty...the best account of the subject I have ever read." The book was widely praised in reviews, with Simon Heffer in the Daily Telegraph, commenting on its 'meticulous detail' and 'moments of novelty and insight', Andrew Rawnsley, in the Observer, commending its 'gripping' narravie' and Andrew Roberts, in the Wall Street Journal, describing it as 'excellent.' Peter Frankopan described the book as 'an account of the build-up to the Second World War that reads like a thriller', Antonia Fraser called it 'an eye-opening narrative', while Noel Malcolm described it as 'quite simply the best book to have appeared on this whole subject'. Appeasing HItler was at New York Times editors pick and was shortlisted for the Orwell Prize.

A sequel, Allies at War: The Politics of Defeating Hitler, was published in April 2025 and became an instant Sunday Times bestseller. Considering the improbable, incongruous and often fractious coalition that defeated the Axis, it was described as "revelatory" by Adam Sisman in The Guardian, "enthralling and authoritative" by Michael F. Bishop in the Wall Street Journal, "meticulous, scholarly and highly enjoyable" by Caroline Moorehead in The Spectator, "masterful" by The Economist and 'impeccably researched, elegantly written and compellingly argued' by Saul David in The Times. Described by Tim Shipman as "the best book I have ever read about the politics of the Second World War", it was praised by James Holland as "an astonishing piece of scholarship...compellingly told, immensely wide-ranging and utterly fascinating" and by Richard J. Evans as "a major work of original history that is a pleasure to read...a masterpiece." In January 2026, Allies at War was shortlisted for the Duff Cooper Prize.

Unable to access archives during the Covid 19 pandemic, Bouverie wrote an introduction to 100 pieces of classical music: Perfect Pitch: 100 Pieces of Classical Music to Bring Joy, Tears, Solace, Empathy, Inspiration (& everything else in between).

He was the 2020-2021 Alistair Horne Fellow at St Antony's College, Oxford.

In 2022, Bouverie, along with historians Frank McDonough, John Bew, Richard Evans, Jonathan Haslam, and Andrew Roberts, contributed to the two part 2022 Odyssey Television documentary for the BBC Could Hitler Have Been Stopped? The Politics of Appeasement.

== Books ==
- Appeasing Hitler: Chamberlain, Churchill and the Road to War (Bodley Head, 2019) ISBN 978-1-847-92440-7
- Perfect Pitch: 100 Pieces of Classical Music to Bring Joy, Tears, Solace, Empathy, Inspiration (& everything else in between) (2022)
- Allies at War: The Politics of Defeating Hitler (Bodley Head, 2025) ISBN 978-1-847-92622-7
