= History of the Jews in Trieste =

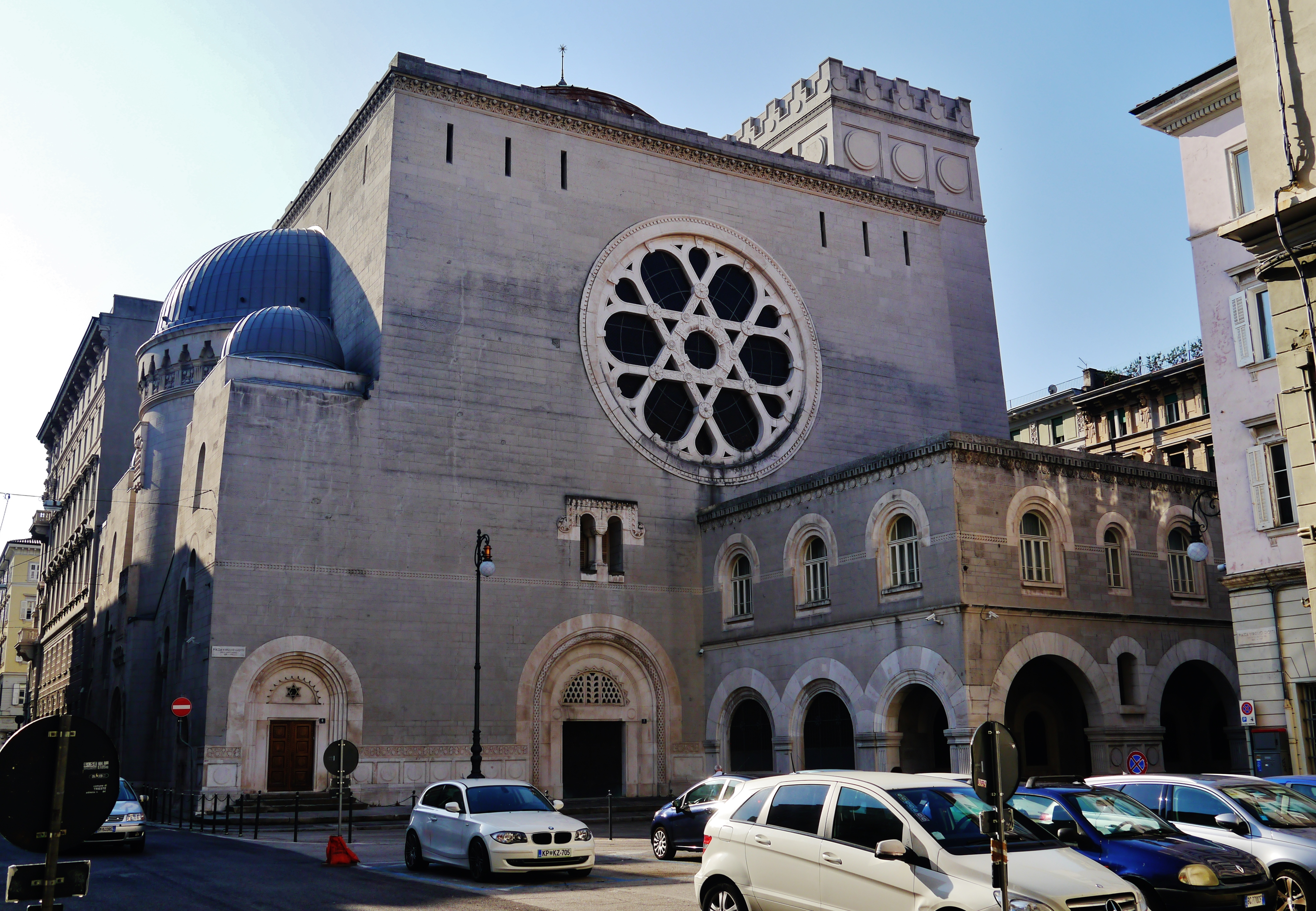
Synagogue of Trieste

The history of the Jews in Trieste goes back over 800 years.

== History ==
The oldest official document available mentioning a Jewish settlement in Trieste goes back to the year 1236. It records a bishop who borrowed 500 marche from David Daniele, originally of Carinthia, now residing in Trieste.

After Trieste sided with Austria in 1382, Jewish people from Germany, some subjects to the Austrian dukes while others to local princes, came to live in Italy. Lacking a synagogue and legal recognition, the small Ashkenazi Jewish community held services in a private home from the 15th century. The nucleus of Jewish Trieste was, for much of the next few centuries, formed by Ashkenazi moneylenders, such as Solomon of Nuremberg, who signed a contract with the city to reside as the "public banker". Other Jewish families resided in Trieste under the protections and privileges granted by various Holy Roman emperors, in exchange for services of "goods and blood" during times of war; these included sovereign justice, the right to practice Judaism unmolested, the right to residence in any town where Jews already lived, which included Vienna, immunity from any taxes not levied on Christian merchants, and others. The community also included scholars; at least four Jewish students attended the University of Padua and the work of rabbi Menahem Zion Porto still survives in the National Central Library in Florence.

Relations between gentile Trieste and the Jewish community were largely positive until the mid-17th century, when the general economic decline of the city began to fuel resentment against the Jews. A notable exception to this was the accusation of Jewish culpability for the plague outbreak in 1601.

From 1684 to 1785 the authorities ordered the construction of a ghetto and the compulsory residence there; the first order for the implementation of a ghetto in Trieste came from Vienna in 1693 and was instituted in Trieste in 1697. However, after the first Jewish public synagogue was built, the Jews from Trieste felt the need to give a constitution to their community; therefore the evening of 14 December 1746, the chiefs called a meeting of the particolari, that is the heads of families who contributed to the expenses of the community.

In the beginning of the 18th century, Trieste was declared a free port by the Habsburgs, with the first free port patents inviting persons of "any religion or nationality" to both trade and settle in Trieste. Trieste official explicitly argued for a policy of luring foreign merchants, with a focus on Greek and Jewish traders, with privileges of freedom of commerce and settlement. Under this policy, the Jewish population of Trieste began to increase dramatically, from under 100 at the beginning of the 18th century to 1,250 in 1800, constituting 5-7% of the total population. Jews in Trieste were granted a range of liberties, including ownership of real property, free and equal engagement in both inland and maritime commerce, artisanry, and manufacturing. The wealthiest Jewish merchants held seats on the Trieste Commodity Exchange from its founding in 1755, holding 6 of the 42 seats by the early 1780s. By the end of the 18th century, the Trieste Jewish community was primarily composed of Italian and Ashkenazi Jews; the Sephardic Jewish population in Trieste was small but growing.

On 19 April 1771, Maria Theresa granted two Sovereign Licenses to the Jews of Trieste, licenses that constitute real regulations. In 1782, with the famous Edict of Tolerance, Joseph II admitted the Jews to some charges in the stock exchange and to other liberal professions. A year later the Jewish primary school was opened with the name of Scuole Pie Normali Israelitiche. The following year, in 1784, the gates of the Ghetto were opened so that the Jews of Trieste could live together with their fellow citizens of different religions; however most of them continued to live in the ghetto. Indeed, after a short occupation of the French in 1797, they began to build two new synagogues in the street of the Jewish schools, but they were demolished during the first quarter of the 20th century when the Old Town was destroyed.

In the 19th century, the Jews of Trieste become more and more important in various fields such as humanities, industry, and commerce, and they also gradually grew in number. Jews became pioneers in the realms of banking, commerce, and insurance that drove the city's spectacular growth. They held prominent political positions, established important firms and founded or were leading figures in insurance companies such as Assicurazioni Generali, RAS, and Lloyd Adriatico. Several local Jewish families were even raised to the nobility by the House of Habsburg. Importantly, too, the Trieste Jewish community produced towering cultural figures such as the writer Italo Svevo and poet Umberto Saba, both of whom today are commemorated with busts in the city's public gardens.

Also in the 1830s, there was an influx of Jews from Corfu, leading to the establishment of a Sephardic community alongside the long-standing Ashkenazi presence.

One of Jewish Trieste's most illustrious sons, Rabbi Professor Samuel David Luzzatto, (1800–1865) known as the Shadal, was a philosopher, poet, Biblical scholar, and translator. He directed the newly established rabbinical seminary, Collegio Rabbinico in Padua. His scholarship combined the deep erudition of the medieval rabbis with the newer trends in Judaic scholarship emanating from the enlightened Haskalah circles of northern Europe. He was a master of Hebrew philology and translated the Bible into Italian. His literary circle included Hebrew poets, such as his cousin Rachel Luzzatto Morpurgo — whose sonnets, elegies, and wedding poems in the style of the Spanish Hebrew religious poets and the Italian Renaissance related mostly to family and biographical incidents.

Although most Triestine Jews were not of Italian origin, they rallied to the unification of Italy. The peace settlement brought Trieste into the Kingdom of Italy in 1919. Immigration swelled Jewish numbers to 6,000; Jews were prominent in the city's economy and assimilation spread unchecked. In 1910, the affluent Trieste Jewish community approved the construction of the Great Synagogue of Trieste. Designed by the Christian architect, Ruggero and Arduino Berlam, its plan followed the trend of other central European communities in a style reminiscent of Middle Eastern buildings, ancient and modern.

=== Zionism in Trieste ===
The Trieste Jewish community supported Jewish settlements in Palestine decades before Theodor Herzl's call for the establishment of either a Jewish state or political Zionism, beginning in the 1860s with calls to support an agricultural school in Jaffa.

By the turn of the 20th century, the Jewish community supported Zionist efforts both philanthropically and as a link to Italy's political and economic interests in the Mediterranean. Trieste became known as the "gateway to Zion" as a result of the city's ties to the Habsburg commercial networks and connections to trading communities in central and eastern Europe. It was also the site of the publication of the Israelite Courier (Italian: Il corriere israelitico), founded in 1862, the first Jewish periodical in Italian to support Zionism. Trieste was also the home of Dante Lattes, a leader of Italian Jews, champion of Zionism, and grandfather of Amos Luzzatto. Triestine Jews led early efforts from Italy to help fleeing Central European refugees escape Hitler's regime.

== 1938 and the advent of Fascism ==
In 1938 the Fascist and racist legislation was introduced in Italy and in 1940 there were some attacks against the Jews. In reaction to the school and job discrimination enacted in 1938, the Trieste Jewish community opened a private secondary school, which operated until 1943, when the Germans took direct control of the city. The Nazi threat prompted those with means to try to escape. By 1940, half of the city's Jews had left the city, although some chose to convert. The number of Jews in this time who converted to Catholicism was very high in comparison to other Italian Jewish communities. Italian Fascists desecrated the synagogue in 1942. During the Shoah (Holocaust) the Nazis made round-ups against the Jews on 19 October 1943 and 29 January 1944; in the latter the target were the old and sick people living in the old people's homes of Trieste, including the Jewish one.

== Point of embarkation ==
Trieste was one of the major European ports of embarkation in the mass emigration to the Americas in the last part of the 19th century. With the approach of the Second World War, it was the Gateway to Zion, an emergency exit for Jews leaving Europe for Israel. Two ships operated on the Trieste - Haifa route. The Jewish captain, Umberto Steindler of the SS Jerusalem boasted over one hundred trips to Palestine between the world wars. After being turned back to its homeport because of the outbreak of war, the Jerusalem weighed anchor once again on 1 September 1939, and arrived in Haifa with 600 Jewish immigrants.

== After World War II and today ==
After World War II around 1,500 Jews remained in Trieste, they restored the Synagogue and renewed Jewish communal institutions; in 1965 the number lowered to 1,052 out of 280,000 inhabitants. This drop was mostly due to a lack of balance between death and birth rates. Today the Jewish community counts about 600 members. The Jewish community of Trieste today represents the organizational structure of the association of Jewish people living in Trieste. The organization was established in order to provide for the needs of the Jewish community, and to establish a statute and appropriate guidelines.

== Famous people ==
- Rachele Luzzatto (née Morschene) one of the first Jewish women to obtain a civil divorce in Christian Europe circa 1796.
- Fiorello La Guardia, born in New York City to a Jewish mother born in Trieste, Irene Luzzato Coen, who was a descendant of a prominent Jewish-Italian family based in Trieste. La Guardia was named after his maternal grandmother, Fiorina Luzzato Coen.
- Italo Svevo, born Ettore Schmitz, the author of The Confessions of Zeno, studied English with James Joyce, the great Irish writer who made Trieste his home for a number of years. His background reflected the cosmopolitan, shifting identity so typical of Trieste. He was born into a Jewish family in 1861 and worked most of his life as a clerk. His mother was Italian and his father a German Jew, and he himself converted to Catholicism. His works, too, reflect a deep interest in emerging fields of psychoanalysis and self-examination.
- Angelo Vivante was a historian, publicist and socialist politician. He was one of the foremost advocates of Austromarxism. He rejected both Italian irredentism and Pan-Slavic nationalism, and called for a peaceful co-existence of different nationalities within a federalized Austro-Hungarian Empire.
- Ernesto Nathan Rogers was a famous architect.
- Umberto Saba (original surname Poli), was an Italian poet noted for his simple, lyrical autobiographical poems. Saba was raised by his Jewish mother in the ghetto of Trieste after his Christian father deserted them when Saba was an infant. The racial laws, the Second World War, and the Nazi occupation in Trieste forced him to leave the "ancient and modern Bookstore" that he had opened in Trieste; it was sheltered first to Paris, then in Rome, where it was hidden in the Ungaretti house, to Florence and Milan. After the war he returned in his city and it got numerous recognitions, what the Viareggio Prize (1946), and the Prize of the academy of the Linceis (1953).
- Giorgio Voghera was an Italian writer and essayist who emigrated to Palestine in 1939, but returned to Trieste after the end of World War II in 1948. He is famous for his travelogues and description of the Middle East, as well as for his essays and autobiographic novels on the intellectual life in early 20th century Trieste.
- Alberto (Avraham) Sternklar born in Trieste in 1930. Pianist and composer emigrated to Palestine in 1939 and moved to the United States in 1949.

== Museums ==
Several museums in Trieste shed further light on local Jewish culture and history:

- The Museum of the Jewish Community of Trieste "Carlo e Vera Wagner" (Via del Monte, 5) was opened in 1993 in a building that used to house a small synagogue. Currently the museum holds many objects of Jewish ritual art belonging to Community, collected partly as a result of the dismantlement of the three Synagogues (or 'Scole') of Trieste after the inauguration of the greatest Temple. The collections are made up of objects in silver, various fabrics, documents and books that testify of Jewish family life and Synagogue rituals. The museum consists of varied spaces, insides and outside.
- The Morpurgo Municipal Museum (via Imbriani, 5) occupies a huge apartment in the mansion built in 1875 by the Christian architect Giovanni Berlam for the brothers Carlo Marco and Giacomo Morpurgo and their families. It presents a fascinating picture of how Trieste's upper crust of magnates and financiers lived. The Morpurgo brothers were born in Gorizia, north of Trieste, and were the sons of a man who was the caretaker of Gorizia's synagogue and a kosher butcher. Born in 1827, Carlo Marco Morpurgo became a banker, financier and businessman who eventually was knighted by the Habsburgs in 1869. The museum includes room after room whose opulent furnishings bear witness to the wealth, taste and luxurious lifestyle of the family—a sort of 19th century version of Lifestyles of the Rich and Famous. The Hall of Music is particularly remarkable.
- Risiera di San Sabba Civic Museum

== Cemetery ==
The old cemetery was created in 1446, when Michael Norimberga bought a vineyard to make a cemetery for himself and his coreligionists. The Jews from Trieste buried their dead there for four centuries. In the middle of the nineteenth century the cemetery became too small, so it was extended until it reached the slopes under the Castle of S. Giusto. In 1843 a new Jewish cemetery was built near the Catholic cemetery of Sant'Anna.

== See also ==
- History of the Jews in Austria
- History of the Jews in Calabria
- History of the Jews in Livorno
- History of the Jews in Naples
- History of the Jews in Sicily
- History of the Jews in Slovenia
- History of the Jews in the Roman Empire
- History of the Jews in Turin
- History of the Jews in Venice
