= 1920 in architecture =

The year 1920 in architecture involved some significant events.

== Events ==
- Construction of Welwyn Garden City in England begins with Louis de Soissons as architect and town planner.
- Edith Hughes establishes her own architectural practice, in Glasgow, the first British woman to do so.
- In the first issue of the Purist art magazine L' Esprit Nouveau co-founded by him, Charles-Édouard Jeanneret-Gris adopts the pseudonym Le Corbusier.

== Buildings and structures ==
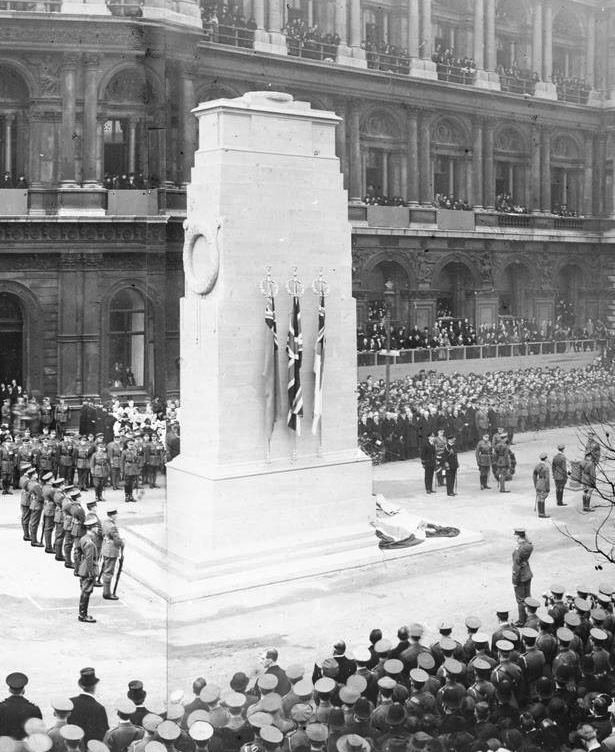
The Cenotaph, Whitehall in London, on 11 November 1920

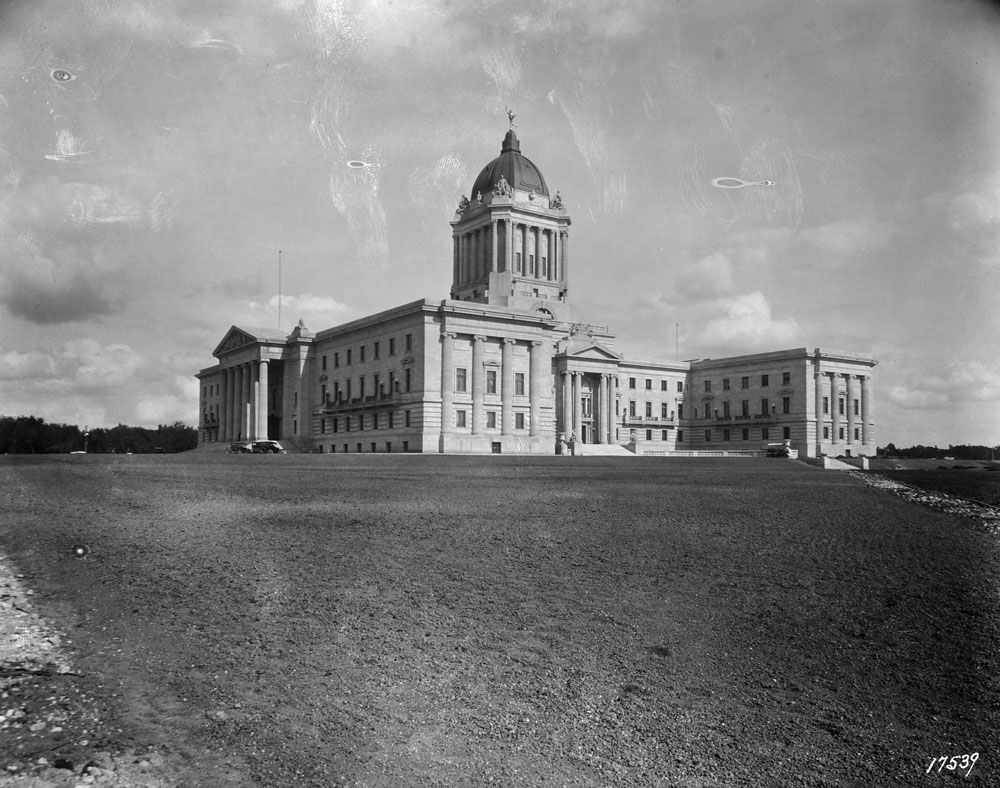
Manitoba Legislative Building in Winnipeg, Canada

=== Buildings opened ===
- November 11 – The Cenotaph, Whitehall, London, designed by Edwin Lutyens.

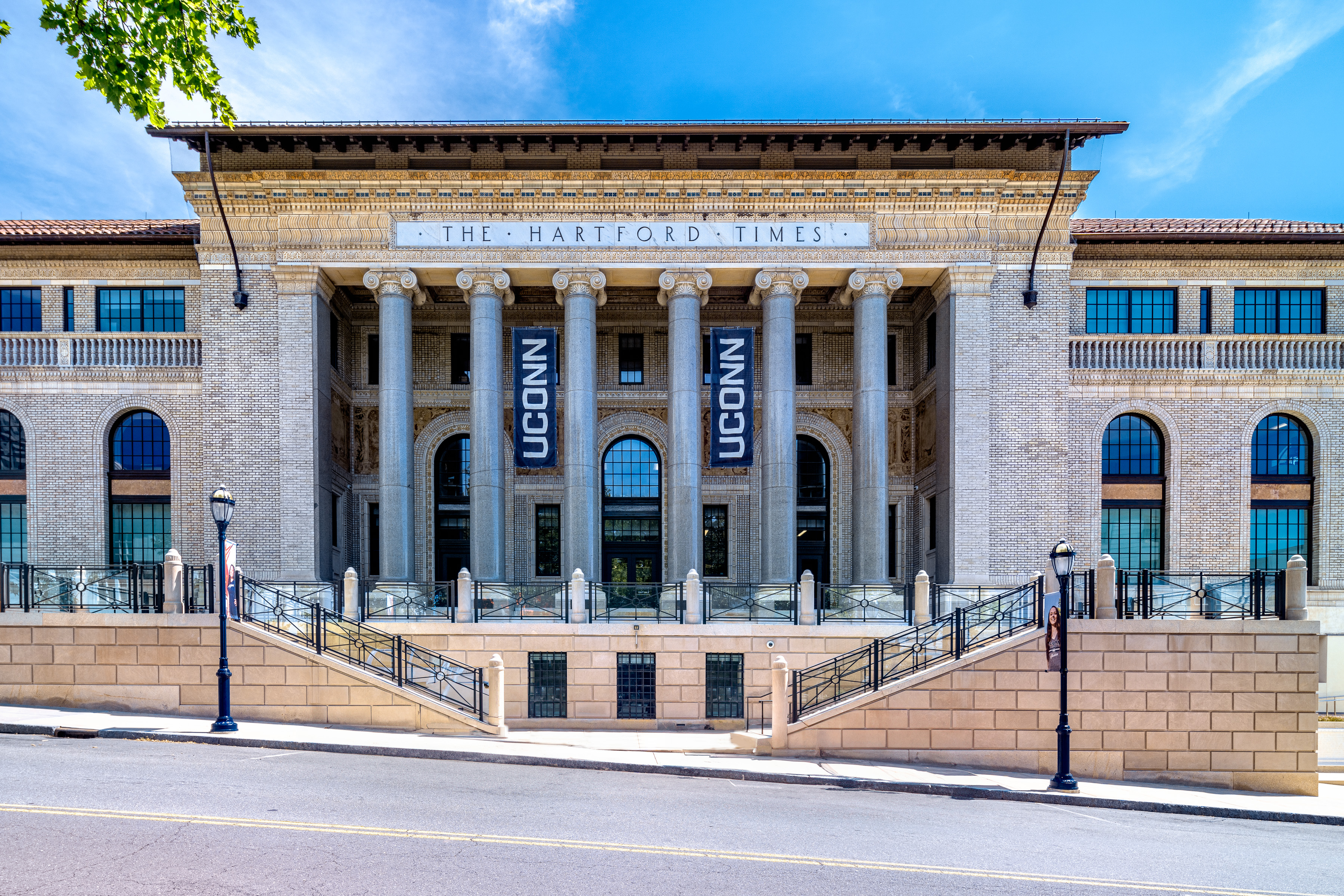
Hartford Times Building. Architect: Donn Barber

=== Buildings completed ===
- Ajuria Enea, Vitoria-Gasteiz, Spain, designed by Alfredo Baeschlin.
- Coliseum Theatre (Kuala Lumpur), Malaysia.
- Hartford Times Building, Hartford, Connecticut, designed by Donn Barber
- Manitoba Legislative Building in Winnipeg, Manitoba, Canada.
- Oak Tower, Downtown Kansas City, Missouri, USA.
- Oslo Synagogue, Norway.
- Teatro Municipal (Lima), Peru.
- Bankstown Reservoir in Sydney, Australia

== Awards ==
- AIA Gold Medal – Egerton Swartwout
- Olympic silver medal – Holger Sinding-Larsen of Norway for Project for a gymnastics school (no other medals awarded)
- RIBA Royal Gold Medal – Charles Louis Girault
- Grand Prix de Rome, architecture: Michel Roux-Spitz

== Births ==
- January 23 – Gottfried Böhm, German architect (died 2021)
- July 16 – Peter Yates, English architect (died 1982)
- August 21 – Vincent Scully, American architectural historian (died 2017)
- September 2 – Romaldo Giurgola, Italian-American-Australian academic architect, professor and author (died 2016)
- October 21 – William Whitfield, English architect (died 2019)
- December 28 – Bruce McCarty, American architect (died 2013)

== Deaths ==
- March 12 – Hermann Eggert, German architect (born 1888)
- May 17 – Jean-Louis Pascal, academic French architect (born 1837)
- May 18 – Frank Matcham, English theatrical architect and designer (born 1854)
- July 31 – Thomas Tryon, American architect (born 1859)
- October 22 – Ruggero Berlam, Italian architect (born 1854)
