= Madison Square Presbyterian Church =

Madison Square Presbyterian Church may refer to two churches in Manhattan, New York City:

- Madison Square Presbyterian Church, New York City (1854), designed by Richard Upjohn
- Madison Square Presbyterian Church, New York City (1906), designed by Stanford White
