= 1854 in architecture =

The year 1854 in architecture involved some significant events and new buildings.

== Buildings and structures ==
=== Buildings completed ===
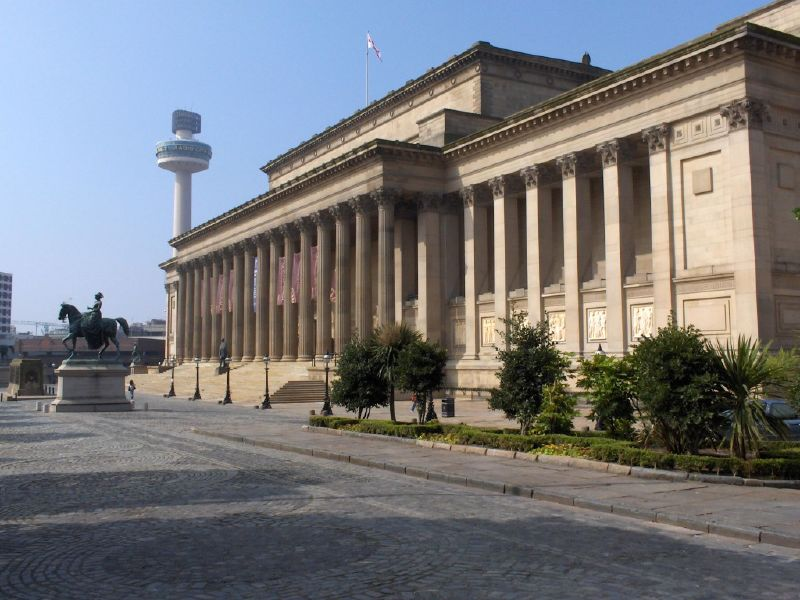
St George's Hall, Liverpool

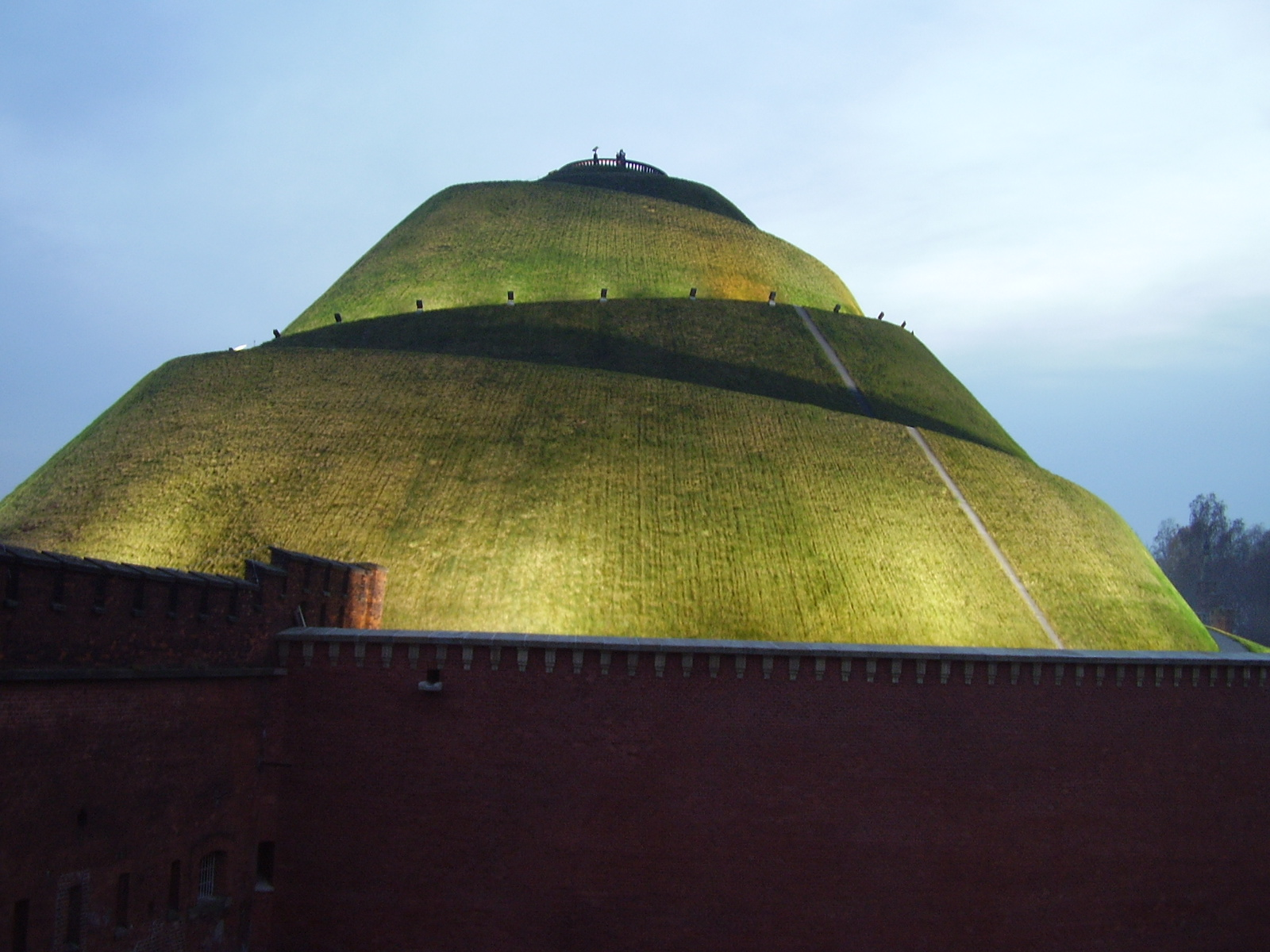
Kościuszko Mound

- Pena National Palace in Sintra, Portugal, designed by Baron Wilhelm Ludwig von Eschwege.
- Church of St. Walburge, Preston, Lancashire, England, designed by Joseph Hansom (spire completed 1866).
- St George's Hall, Liverpool, England, completed by Charles Robert Cockerell to the design of Harvey Lonsdale Elmes.
- The Kościuszko Mound in Kraków, Poland, erected in commemoration of Tadeusz Kościuszko, a national hero in Poland, Lithuania, Belarus and the United States.
- The Wellington Monument, overlooking Wellington, Somerset, England, erected to celebrate the Duke of Wellington's victory at the Battle of Waterloo, completed by Henry Goodridge to the design of Thomas Lee (1794–1834).
- The Semper Gallery in Dresden, Germany, designed by Gottfried Semper.

== Awards ==
- RIBA Royal Gold Medal – Philip Hardwick
- Grand Prix de Rome, architecture – Joseph Auguste Émile Vaudremer.

== Publications ==
- Eugène Viollet-le-Duc begins publication of Dictionnaire raisonné de l'architecture française du XIe au XVe siècle

== Births ==
- February 2 – Emily Elizabeth Holman, American architect (died 1925)
- April 18 – Ludwig Levy, German Jewish historicist architect (died 1907)
- July 31 – George Franklin Barber, American architect, best known for his residential designs sold by mail order (died 1915)
- September 20 – Ruggero Berlam, Italian architect (died 1920)
- October 2 – Patrick Geddes, Scottish urban theorist (died 1932)
- November – Edward Hudson, English architectural publisher and patron (died 1936)
- November 22 – Frank Matcham, English theatre architect (died 1920)

== Deaths ==
- March 3 – James Blackburn, English-born civil engineer, surveyor and architect, best known for his work in Australia (born 1803; fatally injured in fall from horse)
