= Edward Huntting Rudd =

American minister (1860–1909)

Rev. Edward Huntting Rudd
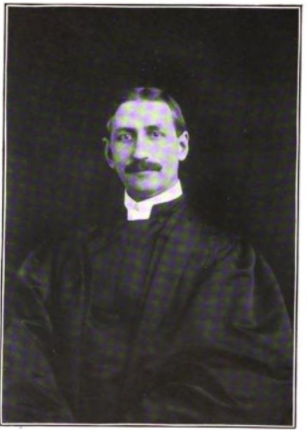
- Church: Sixth Presbyterian Church (Albany, New York), 1897-1891; First Presbyterian Church (Albion, New York), 1897; Madison Square Presbyterian Church (New York City); Allin Congregational Church (Dedham, Massachusetts), (c)1902-1909
- Predecessor: Joseph B. Seabury

Personal details
- Born: June 17, 1860 Sag Harbor, New York
- Died: July 8, 1909 (aged 49) Dedham, Massachusetts
- Buried: Stockbridge Cemetery
- Denomination: Presbyterian and Congregationalist
- Residence: Dedham, Massachusetts
- Parents: Edward Payson and Elizabeth née Huntting Rudd
- Spouse: Mary Winslow Dwight
- Children: Henry Williams Dwight Rudd, Bessie Huntting Rudd, Edward Huntting Rudd, Jr
- Education: Princeton College

Edward Huntting Rudd (June 17, 1860 – July 8, 1909) was the minister of the Allin Congregational Church and the chaplain of the Sons of the Revolution.

== Early life and education ==
Edward Huntting Rudd, son of Edward Payson and Elizabeth née Huntting Rudd, was born at Sag Harbor, New York on June 17, 1860. He was baptized by William Adams at the Madison Square Presbyterian Church in New York City where his father was active. He attended public and private schools at Sag Harbor and at Rahway, New Jersey, preparing for college at the Rutgers Grammar School in New Brunswick, New Jersey from which he was graduated in the class of 1879. He entered Princeton College, from which he was graduated in 1883 with the degree of AB. In 1886, he received a master's degree. He attended the Princeton Theological Seminary, graduating in the class of 1887. He took a graduate course in Edinburgh University and at the New College, Edinburgh at Edinburgh Theological Seminary in 1884, and took post graduate studies at the University of Bonn in Germany in 1900 and 1901.

== Family and personal life ==
He issued his first book in December 1908, Dedham's Ancient Landmarks and their National Significance. He was a Republican.

Rudd was married on September 29, 1887, to Mary Winslow Dwight of Pittsfield, Massachusetts and they had three children, all born at Albion, New York: Henry Williams Dwight Rudd, born February 7, 1893; Bessie Huntting Rudd, born June 6, 1895; and Edward Huntting Rudd, Jr, born October 15, 1896. (Note: Mary was born at Auburn, New York on November 12, 1853, the daughter of Henry Williams and Mary Jane Winslow Dwight. Her father was a descendant of John Dwight, an immigrant who was admitted a freeman March 13, 1639 at Dedham, the same day John Huntting, ancestor of Mr Rudd. These common ancestors of Mr and Mrs Rudd served together in many church and town affairs, on commissions and committees.) Mary's brother was Charles Chauncey Dwight. Rudd was a descendant of John Hunting, the first ruling elder of the First Church and Parish in Dedham, from which the Allin Congregational Church had its origins He was also descended from John Dwight, who was also a founder of Dedham. (Note: Possibly also descended from Roswell Hopkins or his father.)

Rudd was a loyal Republican. He twice served as president of the Princeton University New England Alumni Association, which he helped to reorganize, and while living in New York City was a member of the Princeton Club there. For 25 years, from 1883 to 1908, was secretary of his college class Princeton.

He was also a member of the Board of Governors and Publication Committee of the Mayflower Society of New England, the Dedham Ministers Club, the Dedham Tennis Club, the Pilgrim Club, and the Congregational Club of Boston, and the Quill Club. He was chaplain of the Society of Sons of the Revolution of the Commonwealth of Massachusetts. In April 1902, Rudd represented the Massachusetts Society at the Triennial meeting at Washington DC and again in April 1905.

He died, July 8, 1909 and was buried in Stockbridge, Massachusetts after a funeral featuring numerous members of the clergy from a number of churches.

== Ministry ==
He was ordained at the Sixth Presbyterian Church in Albany, New York, where he served as pastor from 1887 to 1891. He then was to become pastor of the First Presbyterian Church in Albion, New York in 1897. He then served as assistant pastor with Rev. Charles H. Parkhurst at the Madison Square Presbyterian Church in New York City. After spending nearly three strenuous years there, Rudd and his family went abroad for a year of study and travel, acting as tutor for another student, and spent the winter of 1899 and 1900 as students at the University of Bonn in Germany. They later visited nearly all the German universities hearing one or more of the professors at each. A very thorough tour was made through much of Europe and Great Britain. While in the Presbyterian Church, he was moderator of the Albany and Niagara Presbytery, a commissioner of the Auburn Theological Seminary, and chairman of the Missionary Congress of New York.

He then accepted a call to Dedham, Massachusetts where he served as pastor of the Allin Congregational Church where he succeeded Joseph B. Seabury. After becoming a member of the Congregational body in New England, he was elected as a member of the Board of Directors of the Massachusetts Home Missionary Society and was chairman of the Co-Operating Committee of the Prudential Committee of the American Board of Commissioners of Foreign Missions. He was President of the Federation of Men's Church Clubs of New England.

== Works cited ==
- Society of the Sons of the Revolution in the Commonwealth of Massachusetts (1909). Register of Members of the Society of Sons of the Revolution in the Commonwealth of Massachusetts. The Society.
