= Chattanooga Choo-Choo Hotel =

Hotel in Tennessee, US

Terminal Station
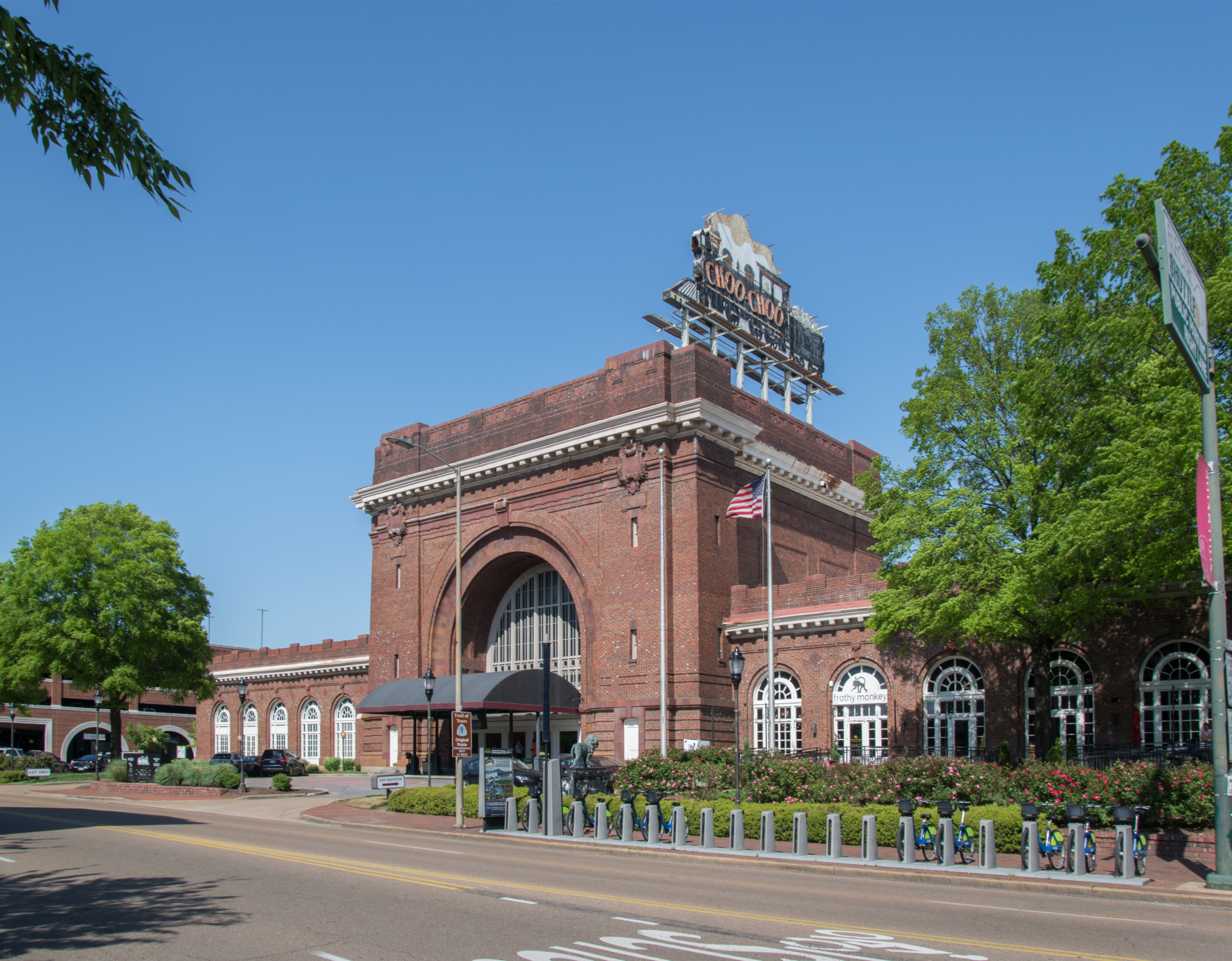
- The building in April 2019.

General information
- Location: 1400 Market St., Chattanooga, Tennessee
- System: Inter-city rail
- Lines: CS, CNO&TP, SOU, AGS

History
- Opened: 1909
- Closed: 1970
- Rebuilt: 1973, 1989

Former services
Preceding station	Southern Railway	Following station
Whiteside toward Memphis	Memphis – Bristol	Citico Junction toward Bristol
Wauhatchie toward New Orleans	New Orleans – Cincinnati	Citico Junction toward Cincinnati
Terminus	Chattanooga – Jacksonville	Citico Junction toward Jacksonville
- Terminal Station
- U.S. National Register of Historic Places
- Location: 1400 Market St., Chattanooga, Tennessee
- Coordinates: 35°2′13″N 85°18′25″W
- Built: 1908
- Architect: Donn Barber
- Architectural style: Beaux-Arts
- NRHP reference No.: 73001778
- Added to NRHP: February 20, 1973
Location

The Chattanooga Choo-Choo (formerly known as Terminal Station) in Chattanooga, Tennessee, is a former railroad station once owned and operated by the Southern Railway. Listed on the National Register of Historic Places, the station operated as a hotel from 1973 to 2023, and was a member of Historic Hotels of America, part of the National Trust for Historic Preservation. The two-floor hotel building, once called The MacArthur building, was renovated and renamed in 2023 to The Hotel Chalet by Trestle Studio, a Chicago-based development group.

== History ==
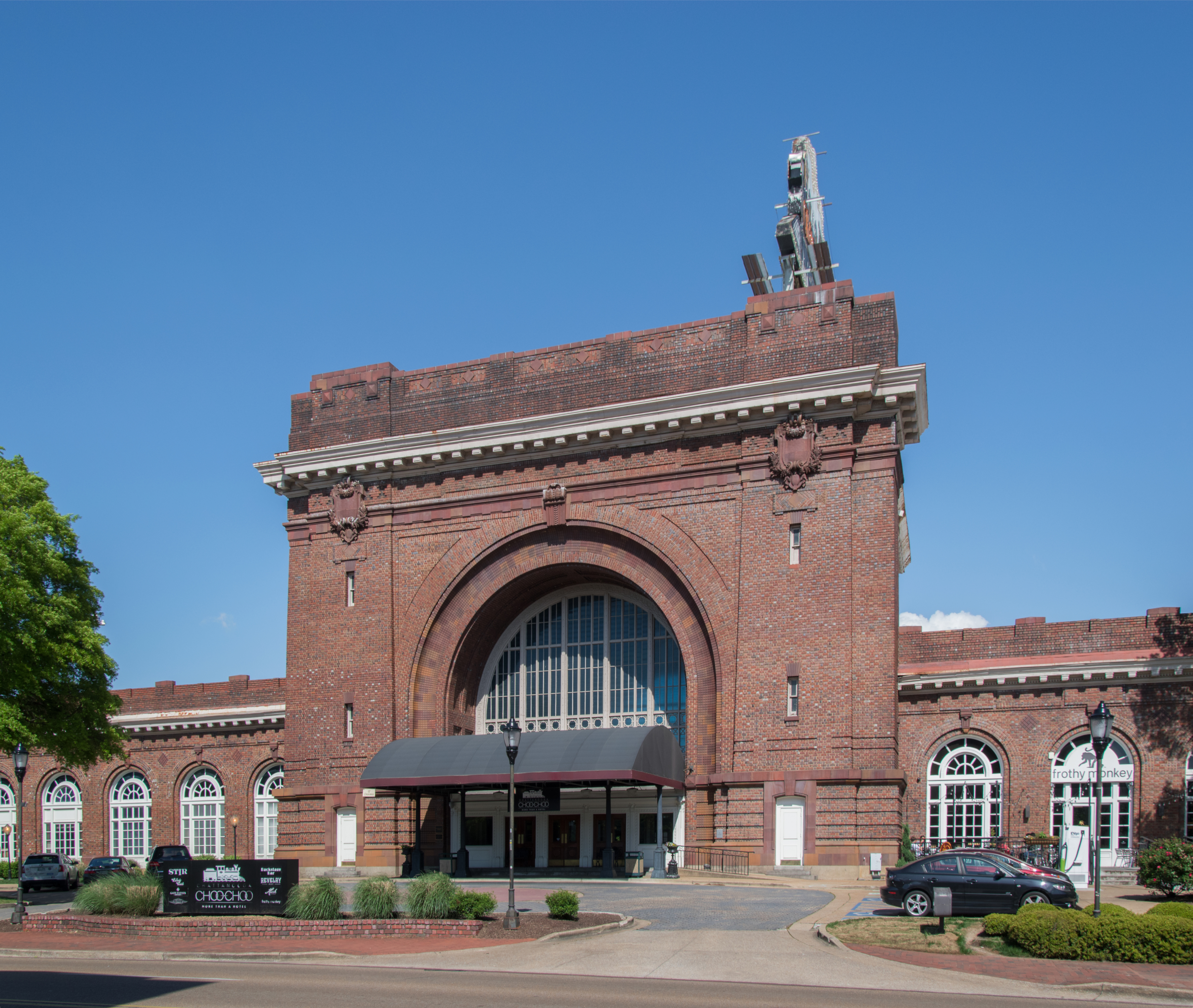
Main entrance

The first Chattanooga Union Station was built in 1858 and demolished in the early 1900s. An initial plan for a smaller facility to handle supplies and small packages was rejected in favor of a grand station to handle passengers as well. Construction on the new Terminal Station began in 1906, on the site of the demolished Stanton House. The Terminal Station was opened on December 9, 1909, at the total cost of $1.5 million.

The Terminal Station was the first train station in the South to help open a pathway to connect the north from the south, connecting the city of Cincinnati to Chattanooga. Eventually, the Terminal Station was serving some fifty passenger trains per day plus some freight and package service.

It has greeted United States presidents Woodrow Wilson, Franklin D. Roosevelt, and Theodore Roosevelt.

=== Decline ===
Chattanooga was no exception to the general decline in American railroad passenger traffic after World War II. In 1949, the Southern canceled its Florida Sunbeam, an express train that connected Chattanooga to Detroit, Cincinnati, and Jacksonville, Florida.

Traffic continued to decline amid competition from automobiles and airplanes in the 1950s and 1960s. One by one, the Southern cancelled its trains, which included the Pelican, connecting New York and New Orleans; Ponce de Leon, Cincinnati-Jacksonville; Royal Palm, Cincinnati-Miami; and Tennessean, Memphis-Washington, D.C. As passenger traffic declined, the railroad began using the station's platforms for storage.

In 1970, Southern cancelled its last passenger train to Chattanooga—the Birmingham Special, from New York City to Birmingham—and closed Terminal Station. Plans were laid for its demolition.

=== Restoration ===
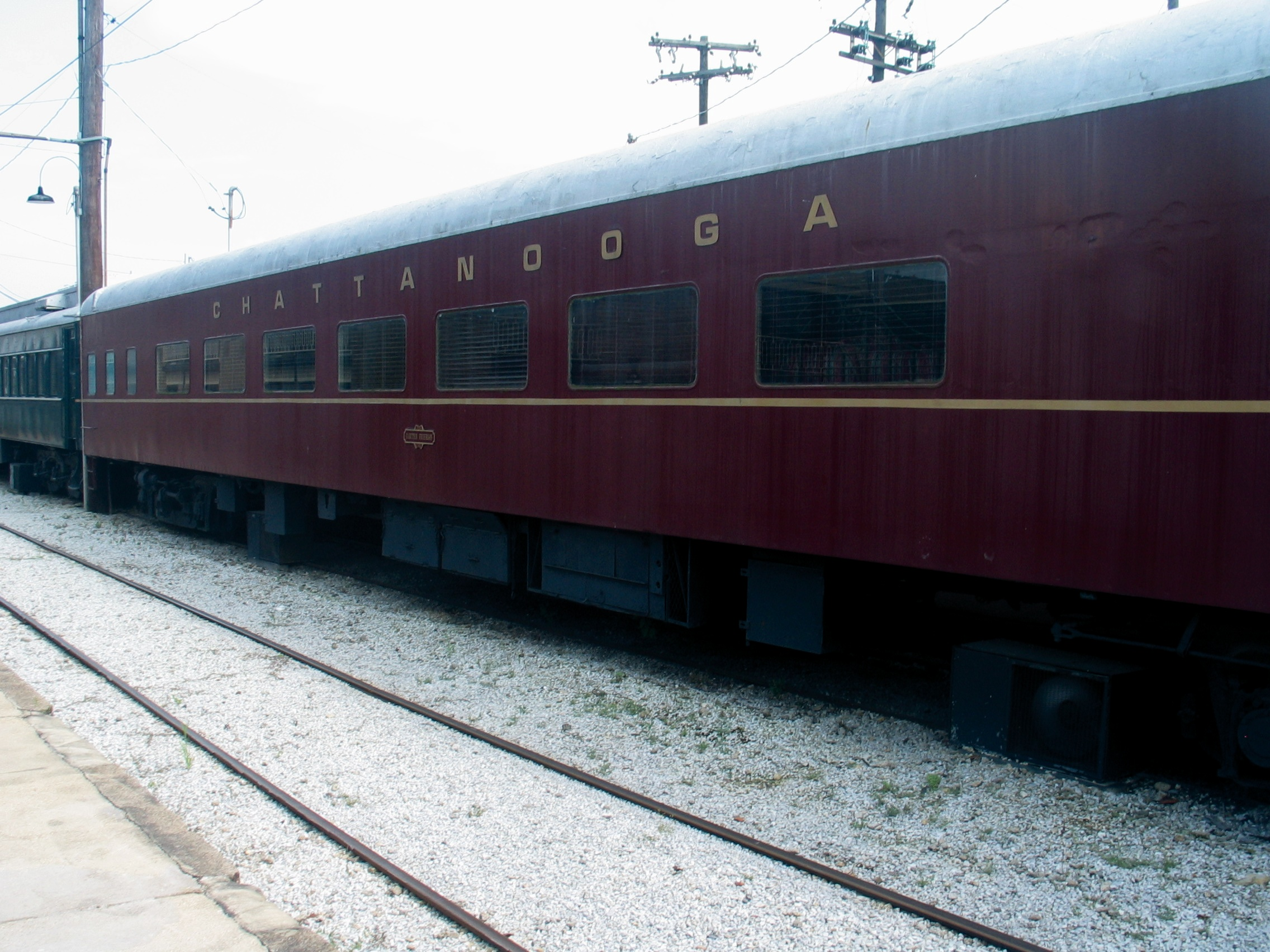
A restored passenger railway car at the Choo-Choo

Instead of being demolished, a group of business people seeking to trade on the "Chattanooga Choo Choo" song and its enduring popularity decided to reopen the station as a hotel. They put more than $4 million into a renovation and reopened it in April 1973 as the Chattanooga Choo Choo Hilton and Entertainment Complex.

In 1989, another group of business people invested another $4 million to refurbish and renovate the hotel and to bring in and hire new management and staff. They renamed it The Chattanooga Choo Choo Hotel.

The 24-acre (97,000 m^{2}) complex was a convention center, hotel and resort with restaurants, shops and a model railroad setup that was operated by the Chattanooga Area Model Railroad Club (now disbanded) on the second floor of the property. Hotel guests could stay in restored passenger railway cars. In 2017, the two rear buildings of the hotel were renovated, turned into small apartments, and renamed Passenger Flats.

The train tracks have mostly been removed to accommodate the growth of the city. The modern Chattanooga Choo Choo Hotel is adorned with a bright neon miniature sign version of the trains that once visited. The hotel is surrounded and fenced in by rose gardens and includes an additional area for educational historic trolley rides as well as an outdoor ice skating rink during the cold winter months. There are several restaurants, a comedy club and the Gate 11 micro-distillery at Terminal Station, including a restaurant co-owned by actor Norman Reedus. A symbol of the terminals previous life is ex Smoky Mountain Railroad exx Genessee and Wyoming 2-6-0 #206. It has been backdated and renumbered to Cincinnati Southern #29. It was moved to the site in 1972 from the Rebel Railroad in Tennessee and has been on display ever since. It also once featured the "Dinner in the Diner" dining car restaurant, which is no longer operating. Some parts of the complex were connected by a heritage streetcar line, operated by a 1924-built ex-New Orleans Perley Thomas trolley car originally numbered #959; this has been discontinued.

In 2022, the complex's owners launched a second renovation, which started with the demolition of one of the passenger cars and the removal of others. Officials said that eight of the train cars will be moved next to the hotel, nine will be moved among the Gardens, and six will be donated to the Tennessee Valley Railroad Museum. The renovation was slated for completion in mid-2023, when the hotel is to reopen with "127 rooms, including 25 Pullman train car rooms".

== Architecture and pop culture ==
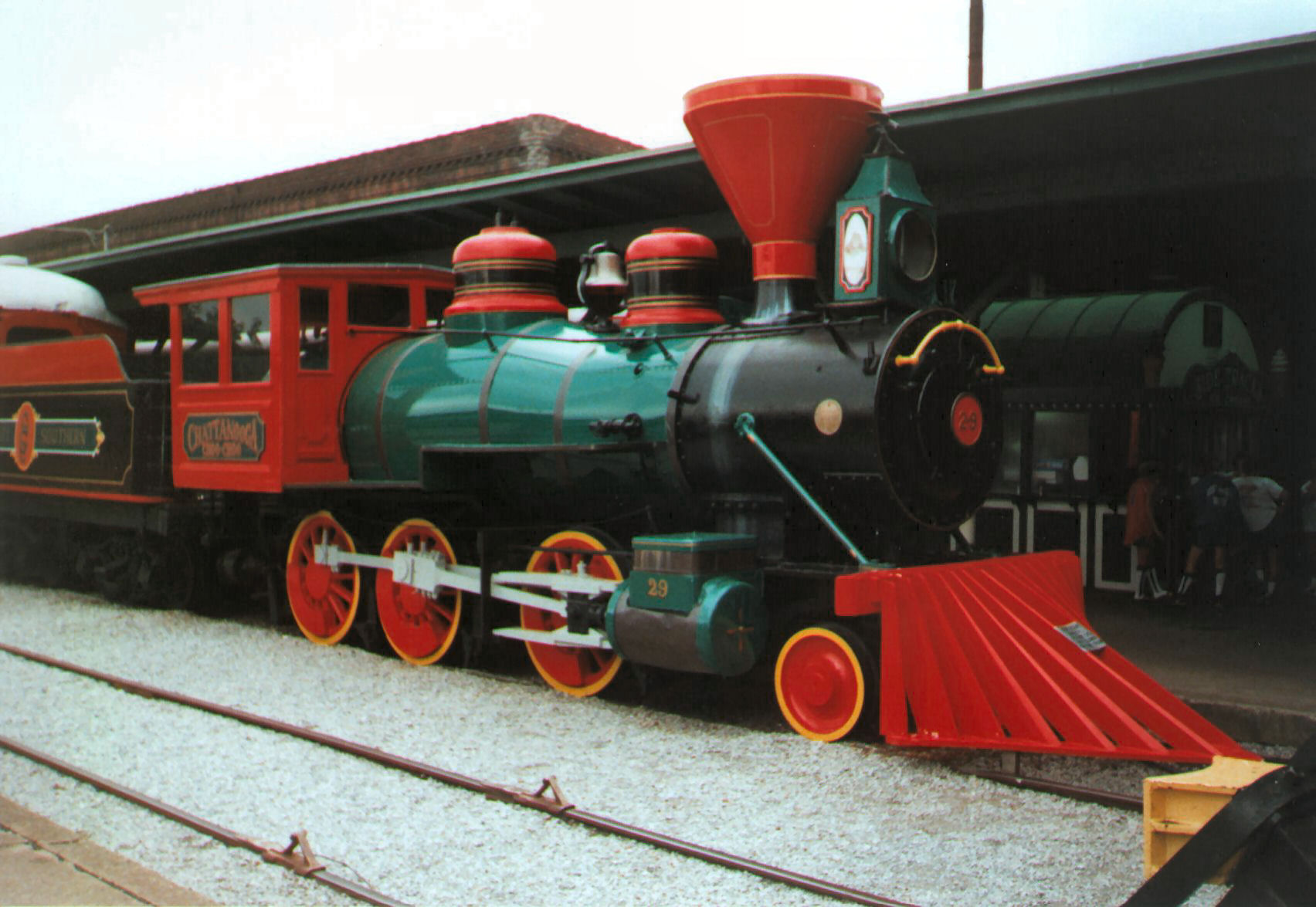
Representative old steam locomotive on display at Terminal Station.

The Beaux-Arts-style station designed by Donn Barber remains one of the grandest buildings in Chattanooga, with an arched main entrance leading to a center section with an 82-foot (25 m) ceiling dome with a skylight.

The station included a main waiting room, bathrooms, ticket offices, and other services for passengers. The original Terminal Station was merely one story in height, so the aforementioned dome and skylight made this area look gargantuan in juxtaposition to other similar buildings, while the arched main entrance was said to be the "largest arch in the world." Lighting was provided by large brass chandeliers. Terminal Station had 14 train tracks serving seven passenger platforms. The then-president of the Southern Railway System, William Finley, wanted the architecture to recall the National Park Bank of New York.

The 1941 Glenn Miller song "Chattanooga Choo Choo" told the story of a train trip from Track 29 at Pennsylvania Station in New York City through Baltimore, North and South Carolina, and finishing the trip at Terminal Station. (No such train actually operated.)

== See also ==
- Union Station (Chattanooga)
