= Charles Chauncey Dwight House =

Historic house in New York, United States

- U.S. National Register of Historic Places
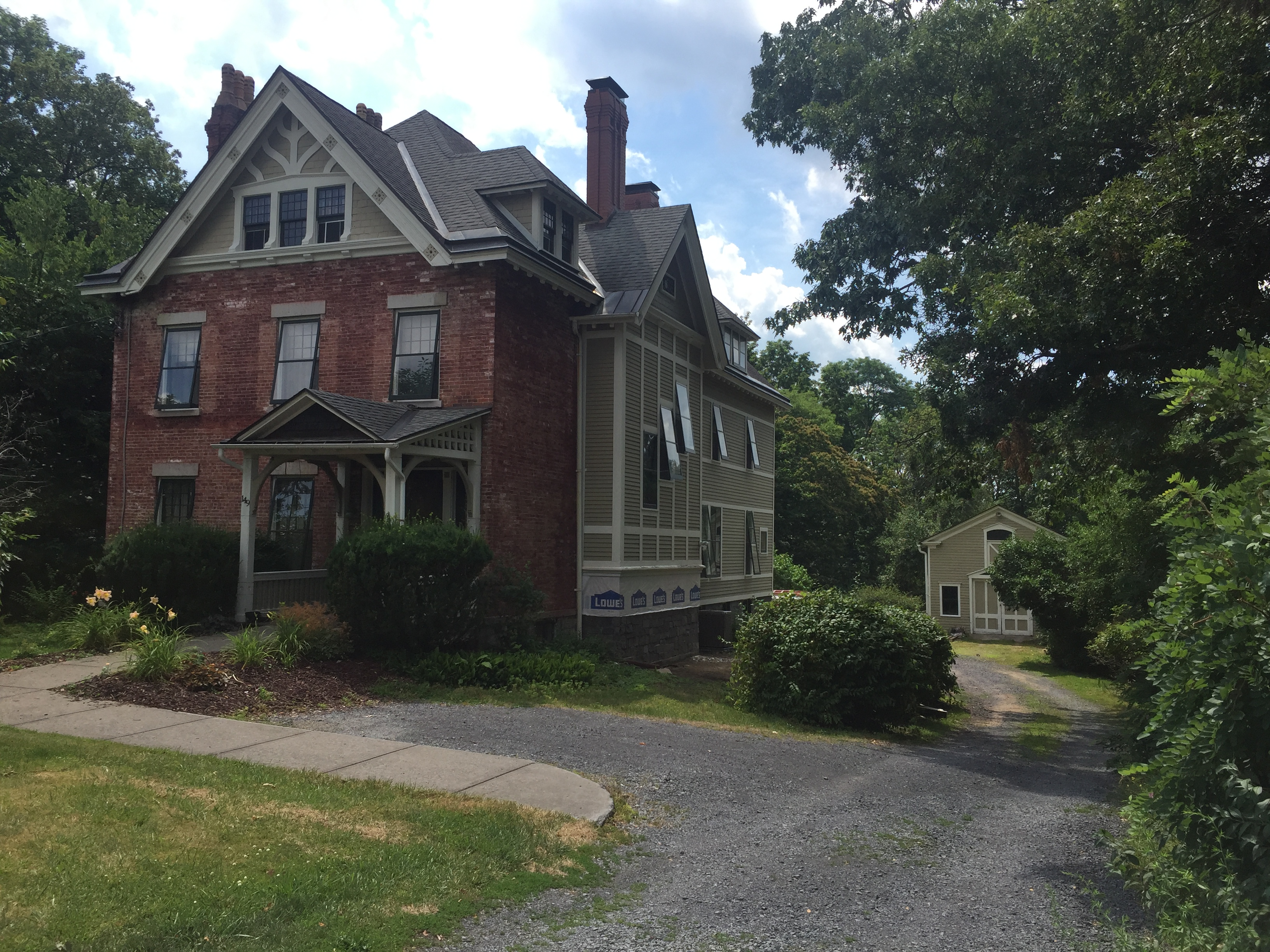
- House in 2022

- Location within New York Location within the United States
- Location: 149 North St., Auburn, New York
- Coordinates: 42.94148°N 76.56725°W
- Area: 2.5 acres (1.0 ha)
- Built: c.1835, 1837, 1871, 1902
- Architectural style: Queen Anne
- NRHP reference No.: 15000818
- Added to NRHP: November 17, 2015

Charles Chauncey Dwight House, also known as the Hopkins-Dwight House, is a historic home located at Auburn in Cayuga County, New York. It was originally built in 1835, and expanded sometime after 1871 when it was purchased by Charles Chauncey Dwight, a State Supreme Court justice, residing in Auburn. It is a 2 1/2-story, brick and frame dwelling in the Queen Anne style with faux timbering detailing, a limestone foundation, and a cross-gabled slate roof with dormers. Also on the property is a contributing mid-19th century wood front gabled barn.

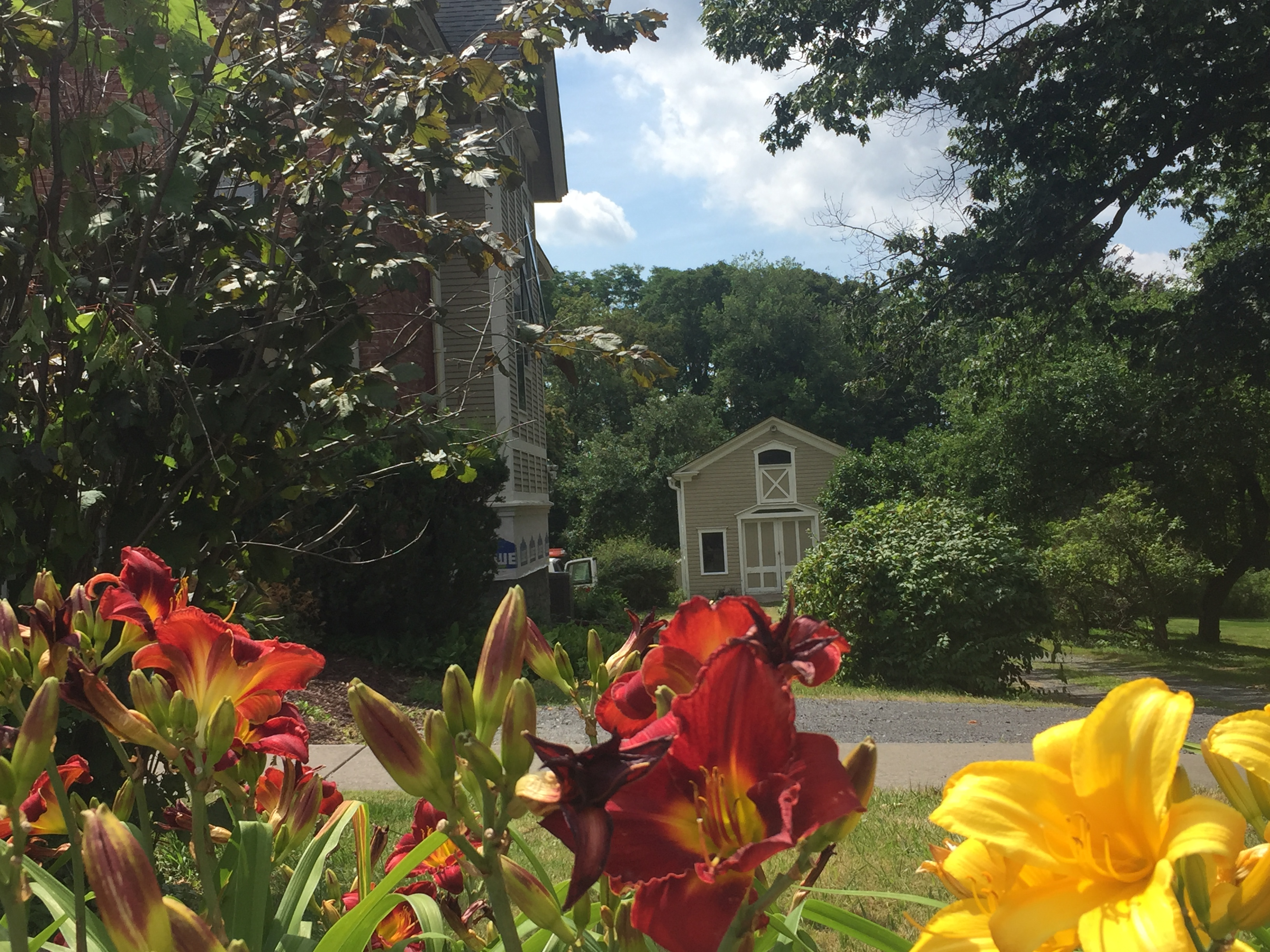
View showing carriage house also

It was listed on the National Register of Historic Places in 2015.
