= Charles Chauncey Dwight =

Former New York Supreme Court justice

- Occupation: Justice of the New York State Supreme Court
- Relatives: Sister: Mary (married Edward Huntting Rudd)

Charles Chauncey Dwight was a justice of the New York State Supreme Court. Through his sister, Mary, he was the brother-in-law of Edward Huntting Rudd.

He owned the Charles Chauncey Dwight House.
