= Synagogue of Trieste =

Orthodox synagogue in Trieste, Italy

- Italian: Tempio Israelitico di Trieste
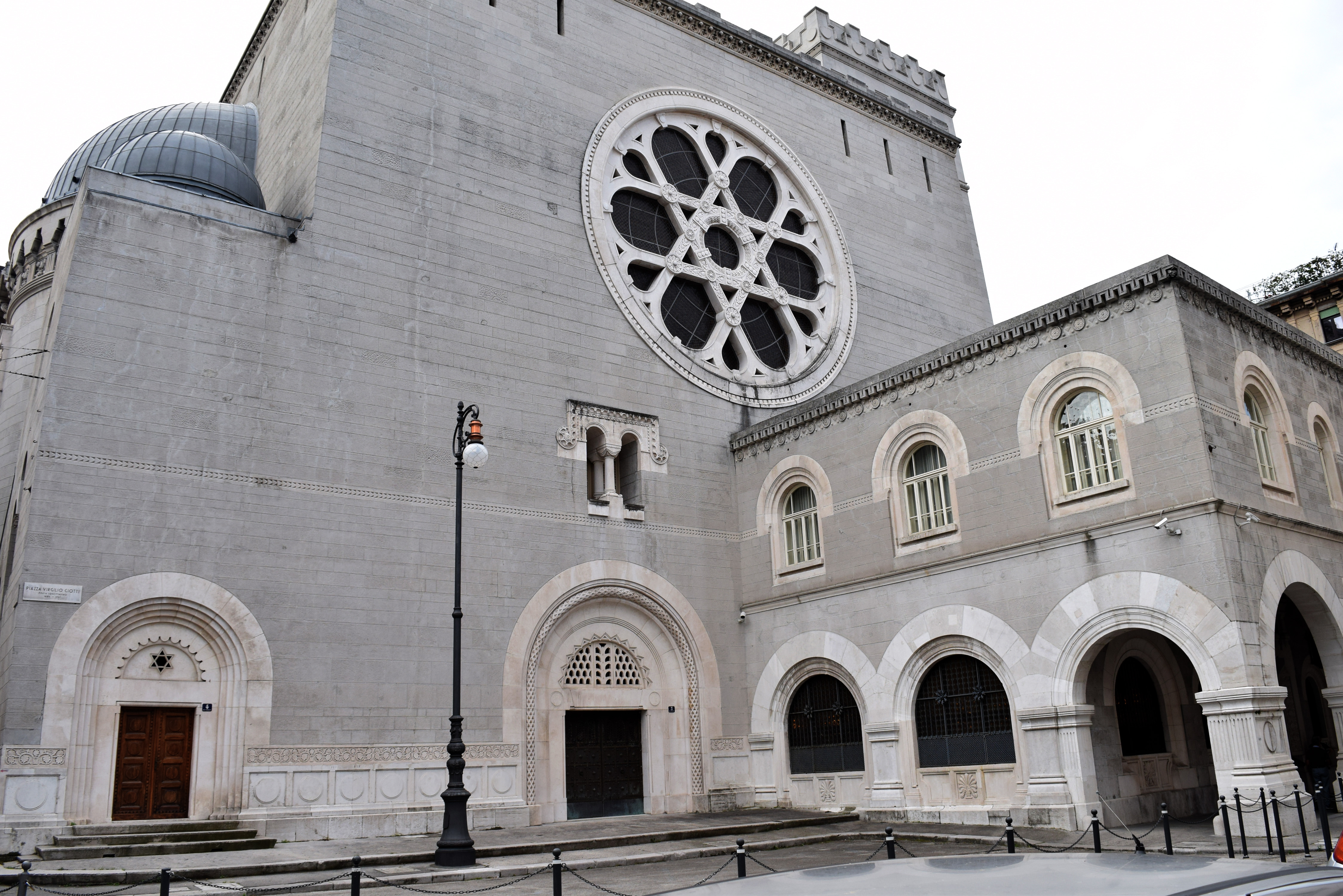
- The synagogue façade overlooking Via Donizetti, in 2014

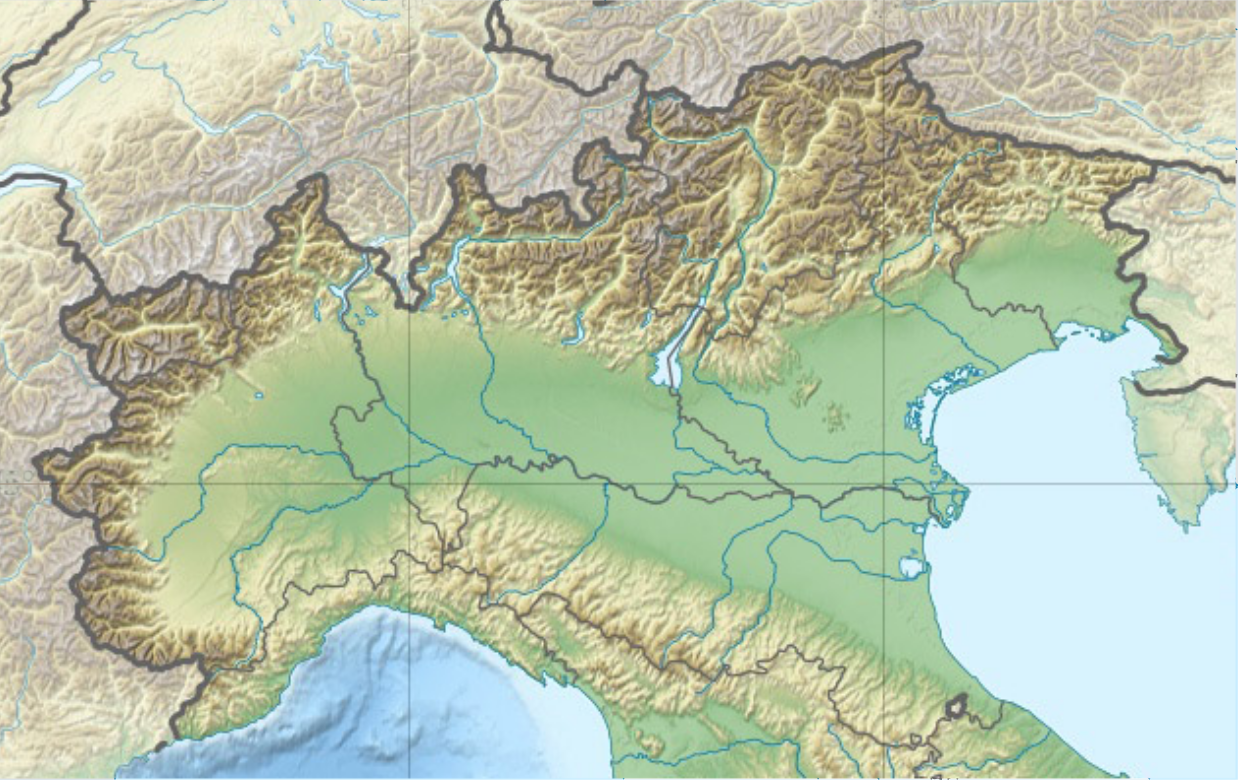
- Location of the synagogue in Northern Italy

Religion
- Affiliation: Orthodox Judaism
- Rite: Italian rite
- Ecclesiastical or organizational status: Synagogue
- Status: Active

Location
- Location: Via S. Francesco D'Assisi 19, Trieste, Friuli-Venezia Giulia, Northern Italy
- Country: Italy
- Interactive map of Synagogue of Trieste
- Coordinates: 45°39′11″N 13°46′49″E

Architecture
- Architects: Ruggero Berlam; Arduino Berlam
- Type: Synagogue architecture
- Style: Romanesque Revival
- Groundbreaking: 1908
- Completed: 1912

Specifications
- Dome: One
- Materials: Brick

Website
- triestebraica.it (in Italian)

The Synagogue of Trieste (Italian: Tempio Israelitico di Trieste), also the Great Synagogue of Trieste, is an Orthodox Jewish congregation and synagogue, that is located at Via S. Francesco D'Assisi 19, Trieste, in Friuli-Venezia Giulia, in Northern Italy. Designed by Ruggero Berlam and Arduino Berlam in the Romanesque Revival style, the synagogue was completed in 1912.

== History ==
It was built under Austrian rule, between 1908 and 1912, and bears the hallmark of architects Ruggero and Arduino Berlam. The synagogue was unveiled in 1912 in the presence of municipal officials, and it replaced the four smaller ones (Scholae) that previously existed, from mid 18th century, and which were based on an architectural model quite common in northeastern Italy, with rectangular rooms with rows of pews orientated towards the centre or the eastern side; inside, they were delicately decorated and furnished but showed a humble and anonymous aspect from the outside.

The Great Temple was meant to satisfy the religious need of a growing Community that, in 1938, had almost 6,000 members. For its construction an international contest was organized, but it had no results. The synagogue was closed in 1942 following the instigation of the race laws under the Fascist regime. It was devastated by fascist squads and later, during the Nazi occupation, it was used as a storehouse for works of art and books seized from the Jewish houses. The ritual silvers of the community were preserved from the plunder thanks to a clever hiding place inside the very building. As soon as the war finished the synagogue went back into operation.

Today it is recognised as one of the largest and most important places of worship for Jews in Europe.

== Architecture ==
Different architectural styles have successfully blended into this building, whose essence is represented by four powerful marble pillars supporting an imposing central dome.

The style has been described as follows:

The exterior style was said to be late Roman of a type found in fourth-century Syria, and the architects chose it because it brought them close as possible to ancient Jewish architecture. Jews in the Holy Land and throughout the Roman Empire had used Roman forms. Syria was near enough to the Holy Land to incorporate design elements used by Jews. A synagogue in this style could suggest the wide geographic distribution of Jews, both in the Roman Empire and in modern times. It could suggest the proximity of Jews to others within the ancient and the modern Roman (that is, Habsburg) empires. It could suggest the Jews' Middle Eastern origin without making them look too close to Byzantine Christians or to Muslims."

=== Interior ===
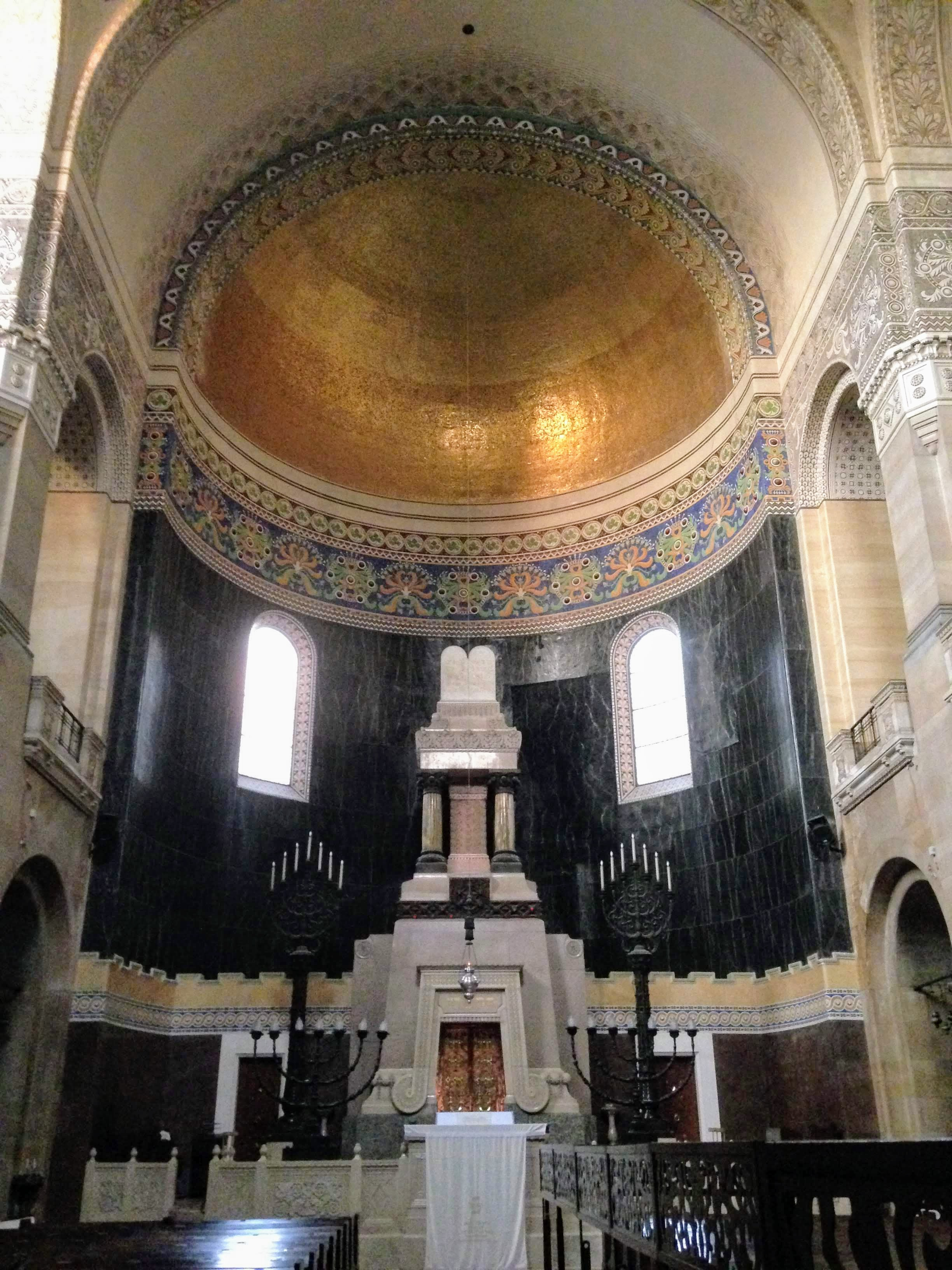
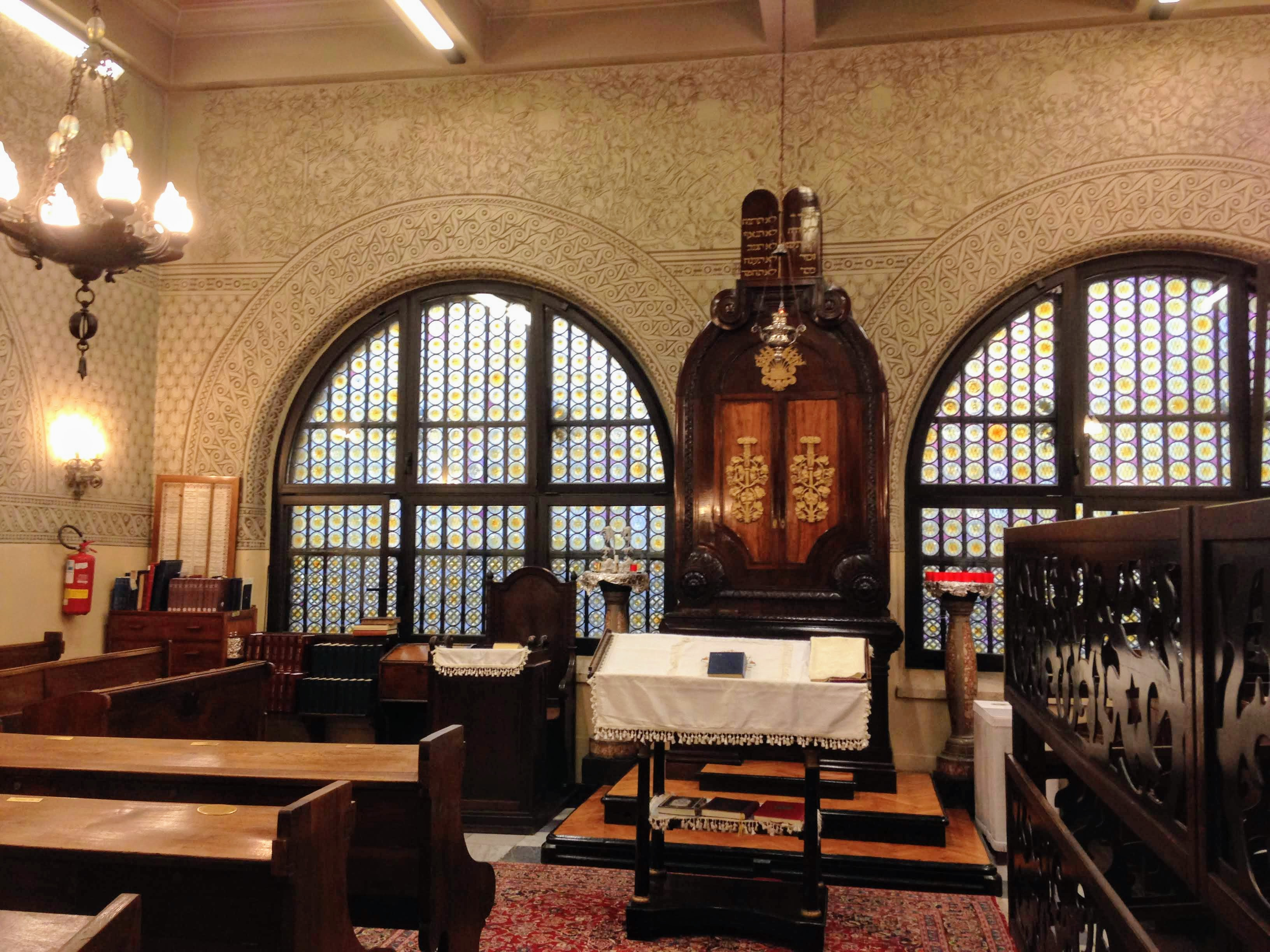
Front part of the Main Synagogue (left) and the Sephardi Synagogue (right)

The size and structure of the building clearly define it as a synagogue of the emancipation period, in which the main prayer room, with a rectangular floor plan, divides itself into three naves ending with the majestic apse and its vault with golden mosaic. The whole room is orientated towards a monumental aròn with copper doors, surmounted by a pink granite aedicule which sustains the tables of the law with four columns. At its sides, two big menoròt, bronze candelabra with seven branches, leaning on a marble balustrade with wheatsheaf, symbols of the Community of Trieste. On the ceiling, elegant pendants, banded decorations edging the dome with geometrical patterns, trees and stars and other bands on the great arches quoting verses from the book of the Psalms and showing trees of life. Above the aròn, on three sides, the beautiful balcony which used to be the women's gallery and that, nowadays, is not used anymore because of security reasons and the small dimensions of the Community. In this gallery, above the entrance door and under a barrel vault, there is a big organ with pipes framed by stars of David.

== See also ==
- History of the Jews in Italy
- List of synagogues in Italy
