= Stanton House =

Former hotel in Chattanooga, Tennessee

Coordinates: 35.0372°N 85.30567°W

The Stanton House was a luxurious hotel which existed in the golden era of passenger trains in Chattanooga, Tennessee, United States. It was built in 1871 and named after its founder, John C. Stanton, president of the Alabama and Chattanooga Railroad. The Stanton House was advertised as the "most elegant hotel in the south" at five stories tall with 100 guest rooms. The hotel became a large attraction for wealthy railroad passengers and even hosted president Rutherford B. Hayes. The hotel boasted restaurants, a barber shop, observatory, billiard rooms and a large dining hall which could seat up to 200 guests. The Stanton House was demolished in 1906 for Chattanooga's new terminal station to be built.

== History ==
John C. Stanton came to Chattanooga in 1869 with funding from the Alabama government to expand railroads from the width of Alabama, reaching from Chattanooga, to Mississippi. He arrived in Chattanooga, which was still devastated from the war, with plans for reconstruction. Stanton, who soon set up his headquarters, promised economic prosperity in Chattanooga. The town welcomed Stanton in hopes that he could help boost the economy. The construction of railroads caused an economic boom and the town's economy improved substantially. Stanton soon built a new center of commerce which he named "Stanton Town" and it featured various shops, depots, employee housing and the Stanton House hotel. Stanton Town quickly became the most vibrant neighborhood in Chattanooga. The town was constructed on the south side of what is now Market Street. Stanton predicted the city would expand south, rather than focusing downtown on the riverfront. The Stanton House was one of his greatest successes as it became very popular place for wealthy railroad passengers to stay.

== Influence and Culture ==
Patronage at the Stanton House became a large status symbol for many wealthy railway passengers and dignitaries. Hotel guests could enjoy dining in various restaurants, participating in grand balls and social gatherings in the large dining hall. Hotel rates were from $2.50-$3 per day and it was advertised that hotel guests were "carried to and from all trains free." The hotel was the first multiple-story hotel with restroom facilities on each floor. The hotel was also one of the first places to host public telegraph use which was installed between the hotel and local horse stable. One of the first horseless carriages was also purchased at the Stanton House, for the use of the guests. The hotel was the height of luxury and attracted many dignitaries and socialites to attend grand balls, including president Rutherford Hayes who attended a lavish banquet held in his honor.

== Demolition ==
The economic demise of the Stanton House arrived because of multiple factors, but a large one was due to the slow growth of Chattanooga and the shift of where the downtown center was located. The Stanton House, once luxurious and prosperous hotel, now brought economic ruin. The ownership of the Stanton House flipped to different owners many times before eventually it was purchased by the Southern Railway. It was demolished in 1906. The site would soon become the new Terminal Station. The Southern Railway invested millions of dollars in the construction of Terminal Station and it became the largest station in Chattanooga's history.
