= Hartford Times Building =

Newspaper office and plant in US

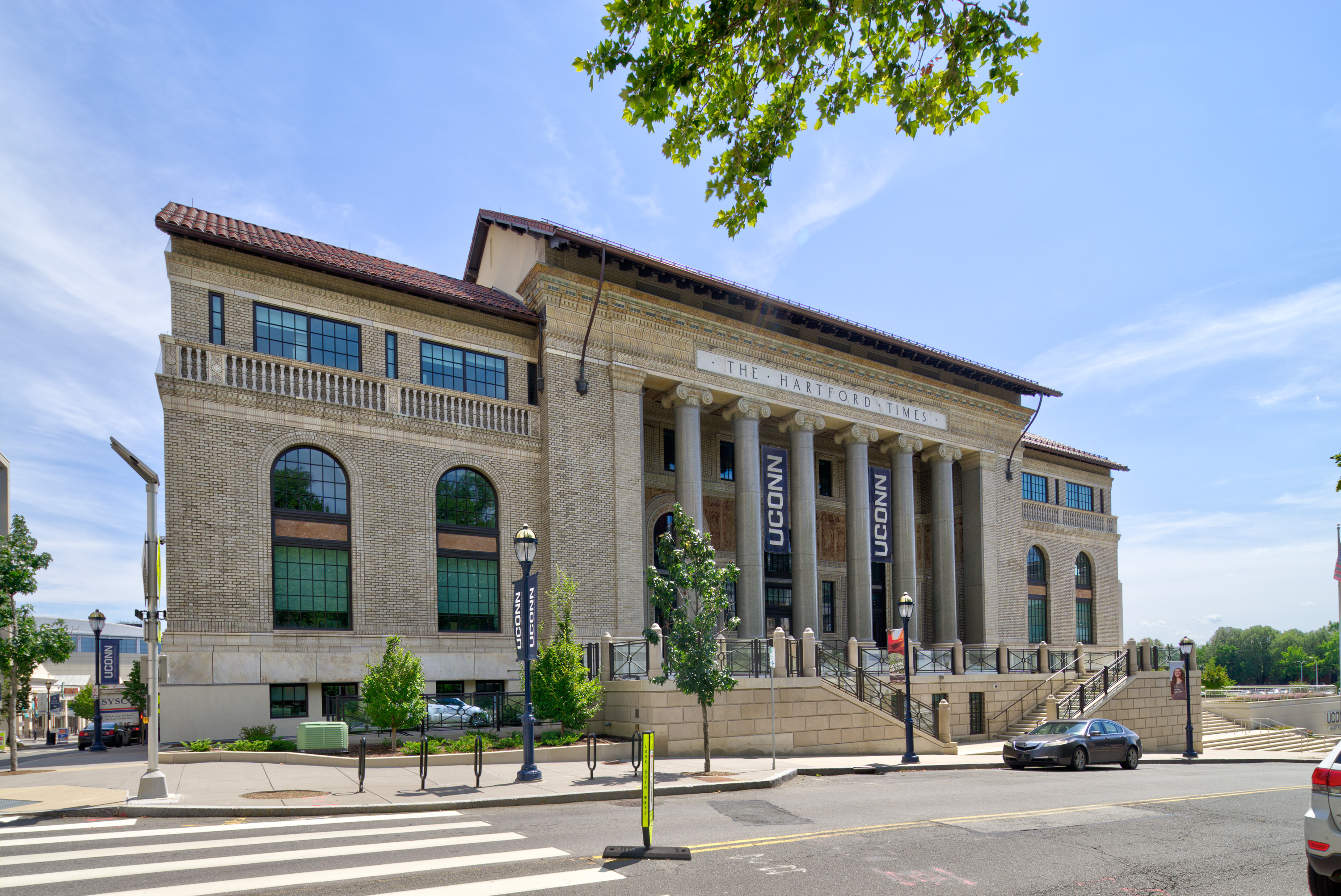

General information
- Status: Houses downtown Hartford campus of the University of Connecticut
- Type: Newspaper office and plant
- Architectural style: Beaux-Arts
- Location: 10 Prospect Street, Hartford, Connecticut, United States
- Coordinates: 41°45′45.3″N 72°40′21.0″W
- Current tenants: University of Connecticut
- Opened: 1920
- Owner: State of Connecticut

Design and construction
- Architect: Donn Barber
- Developer: The Hartford Times

The Hartford Times Building is an architecturally significant, early 20th-century Beaux-Arts style building in downtown Hartford, Connecticut, completed in 1920 as the headquarters of the now defunct Hartford Times. The newspaper commissioned architect Donn Barber, who had designed the nearby Travelers Tower and Connecticut State Library and Supreme Court Building, to design a new structure to house its office and newspaper plant. At the time the paper was at the height of its influence with the top circulation in the state in 1917.

== Architecture ==
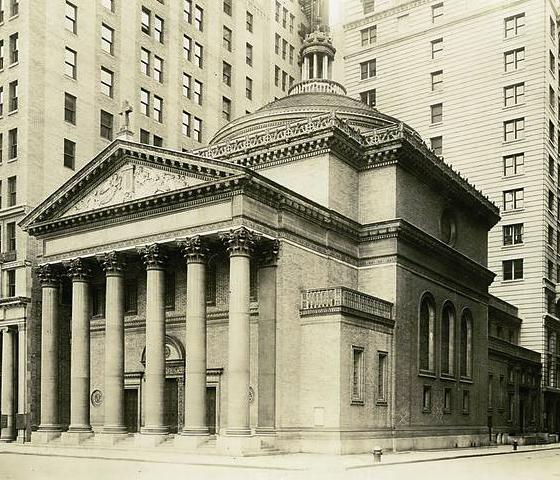
The Madison Square Presbyterian Church, whose columns, pilasters, cornices and windows were salvaged for use in the Hartford Times Building.

At the time of the building's construction, it faced a street (named Atheneum Square South) so that when seen from that direction, the building was flanked by the Municipal Building and the Morgan Memorial wing of the Wadsworth Atheneum. Architect Donn Barber set the building on a high platform so that its roofline would match that of the flanking buildings. Barber's colonnade (inspired, he wrote, by famous Parisian examples such as La Madeleine, the Panthéon, and the Palais Bourbon), made a suitable termination to the urban vista, now obscured by the trees on Burr Mall.

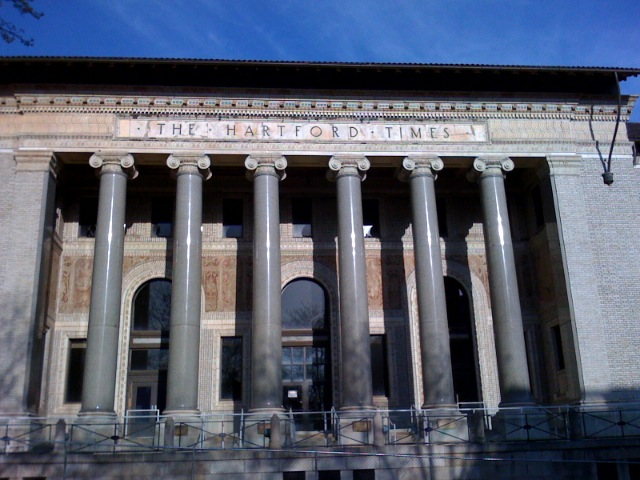
The portico showing the pillars salvaged from the Madison Square Presbyterian Church

When planning this structure, Barber was aware of the imminent demolition of the Madison Square Presbyterian Church in Manhattan. That church, while built only twelve years before and acclaimed as one of Stanford White's finest works, was being displaced by an expansion of the Metropolitan Life Insurance Company. Barber salvaged not only the six green granite columns but also the pilasters, pulling them flush with the columns to transform the church's porch motif of five bays into a colonnade motif of seven bays. It proved necessary to replace the original Corinthian capitals with Ionic and to add a plinth to each column base to provide the desired height for the number of stories of the new building. The original steps, platforms and base courses are all fitted together as in the original church and the terra-cotta cornices were carefully adapted. The circular-headed windows from the 24th Street facade of the church serve as the doors of the Times Building. The openings in the arcade of the Times Building are also all repurposed windows or doors from the Church's portico and southern facade.

The building's arcade is decorated with original murals by Connecticut artist Ralph Milne Calder, uncle to Alexander Calder whose Stegosaurus sculpture now sits in the facing mall. The Sgraffito murals are in a Renaissance style and allegorize Space, Time, Poetry, and Prose. They also illustrate the motto, "News is an immortal bubble (vagrant but outlasting those who make it,) and the press endures within."

== History ==
The Times occupied the facility until its demise in 1976 after which the building came under government ownership and was used as an annex to the adjacent Municipal Building. It was the backdrop for speeches by four presidents, Truman, Eisenhower, Johnson, and a crowd of 100,000 for the final speech of John F. Kennedy's election campaign.

The building had been in disuse for more than a decade and was the subject of various redevelopment proposals, including as an expansion of the Wadsworth Atheneum and as a home for the Thomas Hooker Brewing Company. In 2017, the site was rebuilt and expanded to provide a new home for a downtown campus for the University of Connecticut designed by Robert A.M. Stern Architects.
