= Donn Barber =

American architect (1871–1925)

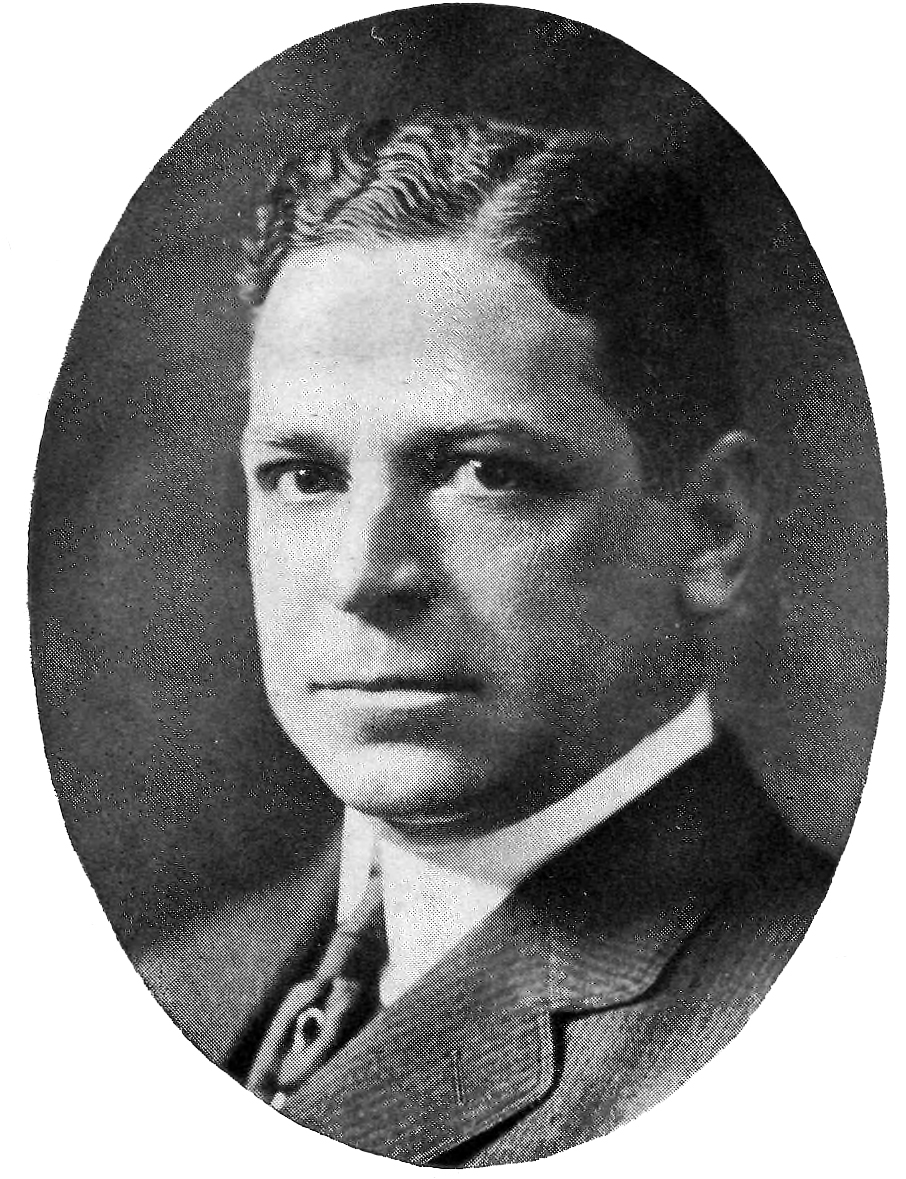
- Born: October 19, 1871; Washington, D.C., U.S.
- Died: May 29, 1925 (aged 53); Manhattan, New York City, U.S.
- Education: École des Beaux-Arts, Paris; Columbia University; Yale University
- Occupation: Architect
- Known for: Terminal Station (1908); Lotos Club (1909); Connecticut State Library and Supreme Court Building (1908-1910); Berzelius Society building (1910); Travelers Tower (1919); New York Cotton Exchange (1923)
- Spouse: Elsie Yandell (1874–1939) (m. 1899)
- Relatives: Louise Serpa
- Honors: FAIA

Signature
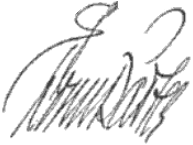

Donn Barber FAIA (October 19, 1871 – May 29, 1925) was an American architect.

== Biography ==
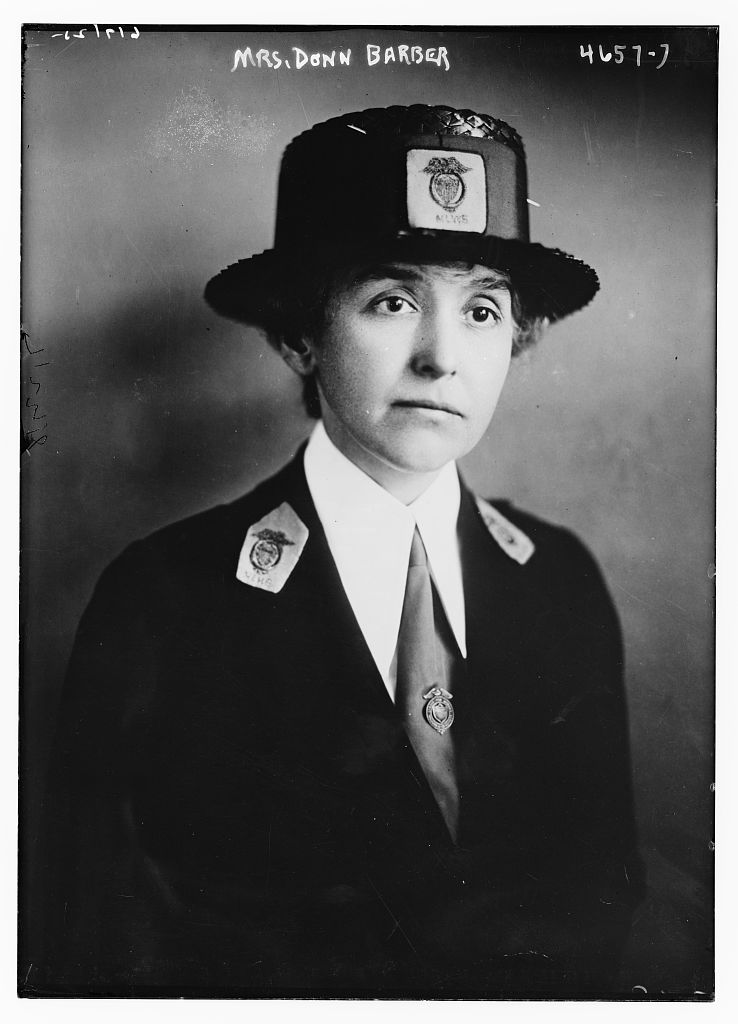
Elsie Yandell (1874-1939)

Donn Barber was born on October 19, 1871, in Washington, D.C., the son of Charles Gibbs Barber and his wife, Georgiana Williams. Barber was a grandson of Hiram Barber.

He studied at Holbrook Military Academy in Ossining, New York, and graduated from Yale University in 1893, where he was chairman of the campus humor magazine, The Yale Record, and a member of the Berzelius Society.

After Yale, he took post-graduate architectural courses at Columbia University, and at the École des Beaux-Arts in Paris under Paul Blondell and Scellier de Gisors. He was the ninth American student to receive a diploma.

After returning to America, he apprenticed in the offices of Carrere & Hastings, Cass Gilbert and Lord & Hewlett. Around 1900, he established his own firm. In 1923, Barber was elected an Associate member of the National Academy of Design.

In 1899 Barber married Elsie Yandell of Louisville, the sister of sculptor Enid Yandell.

Barber died on May 29, 1925, in Manhattan, New York City.

== Work ==
Barber's built work includes:

- Terminal Station, built 1908, 1434 Market St., Chattanooga, Tennessee, NRHP-listed
- Berzelius Society building, Yale University, New Haven, Connecticut, 1910
- Connecticut State Library and Supreme Court Building, built 1908–1910, 231 Capitol Ave., Hartford, CT (with E.T. Hapgood) NRHP-listed
- Lotos Club, 110 West 57th Street, New York, New York, 1909
- Village Hall, 16–20 Croton Avenue, Ossining, New York, 1914
- Travelers Tower, downtown Hartford, Connecticut, 1919
- the New York Cotton Exchange, at 3 Hanover Square in Manhattan, 1923 (from a 1912 competition design)
- Capital City Club, 7 Harris St., NW, Atlanta, Georgia, NRHP-listed
- The Hartford Times Building, downtown Hartford, Connecticut, 1920.
- The Hartford Aetna National Bank, Aetna Life Insurance, in Hartford
- The Department of Justice Building in Washington, D.C.
- and in Manhattan: the National Park Bank, the Mutual Bank, the Institute of Musical Art.

== Gallery ==
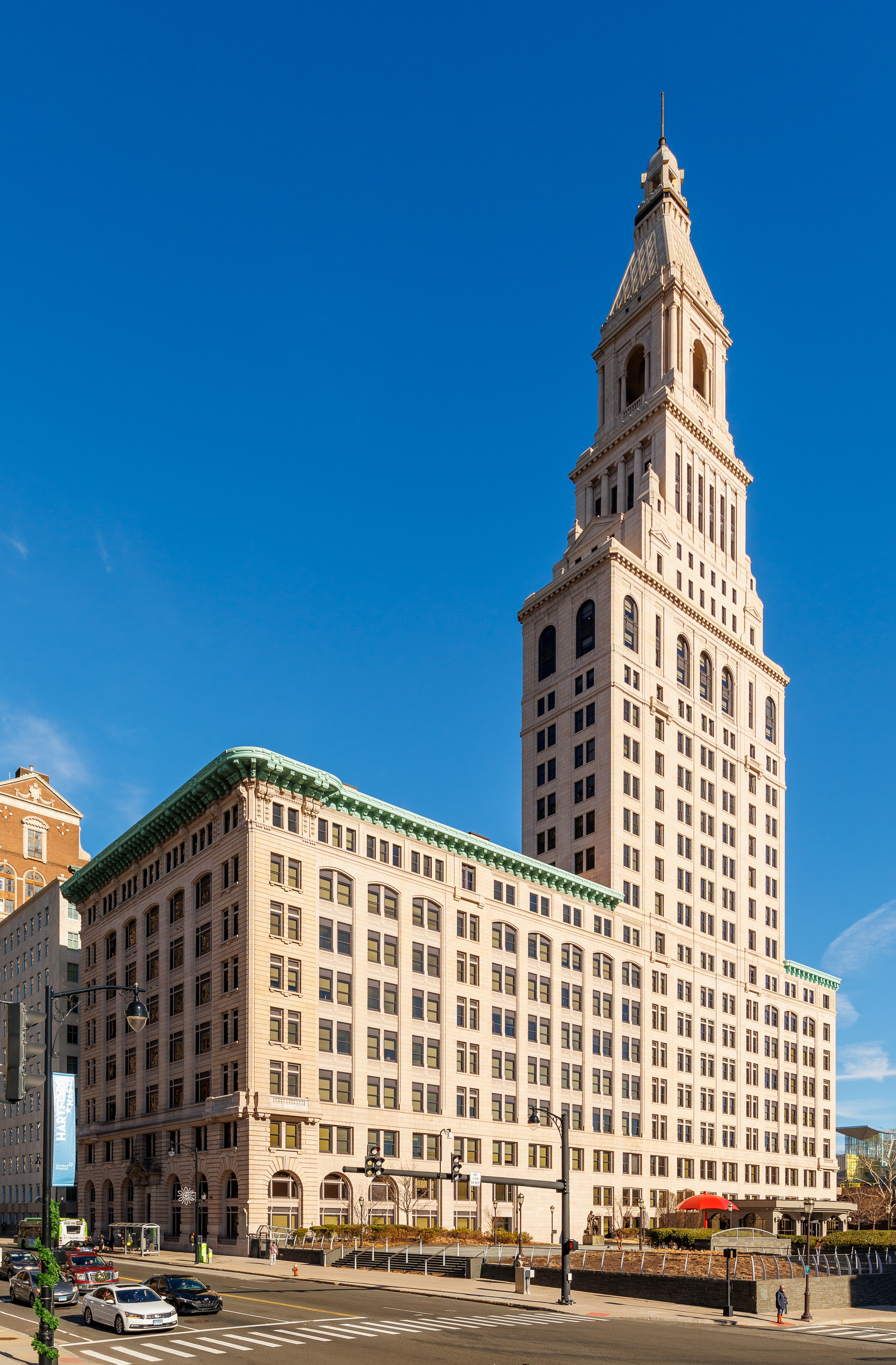
Travelers Tower in Hartford, Connecticut

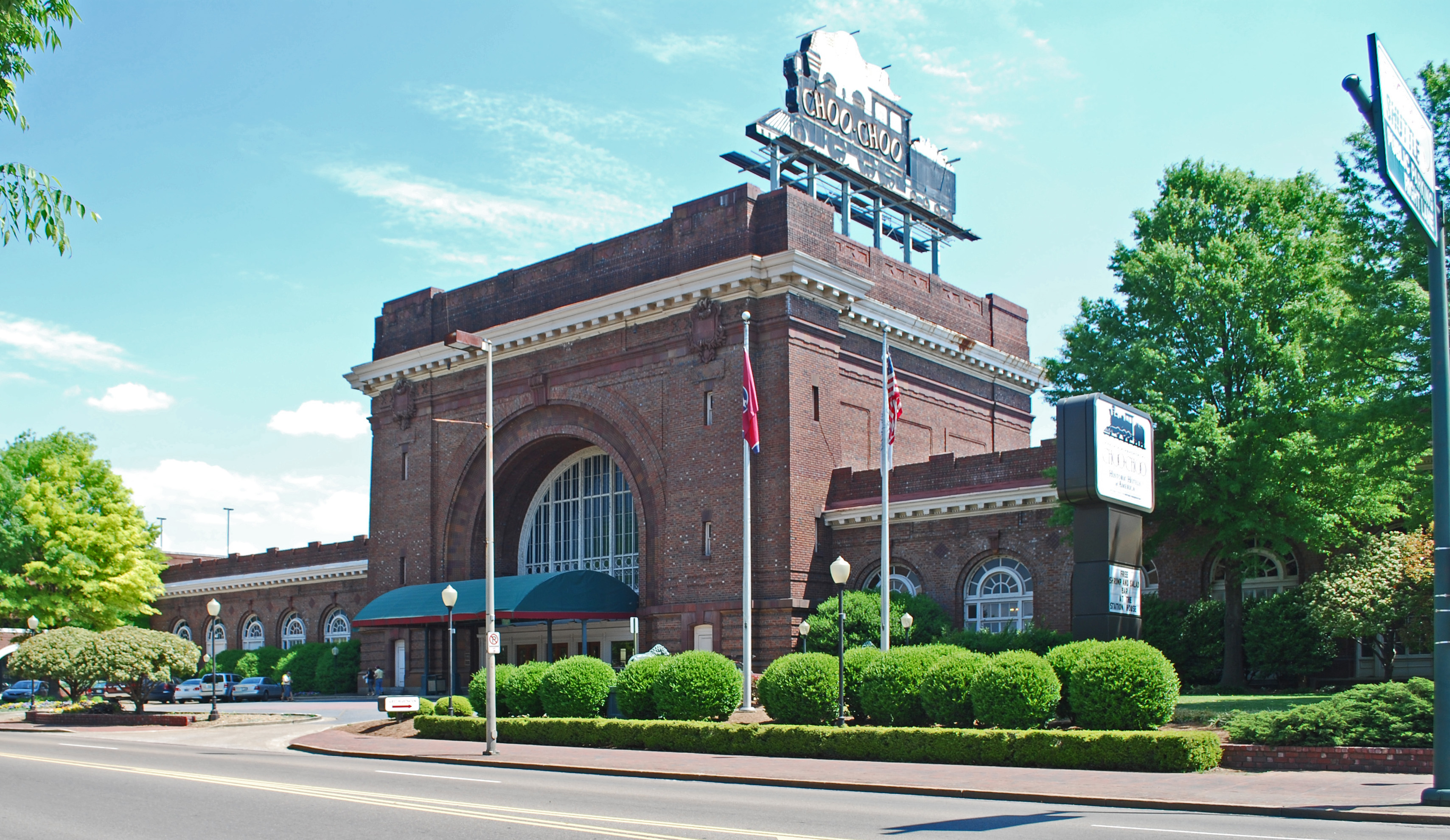
Terminal Station, Chattanooga, Tennessee

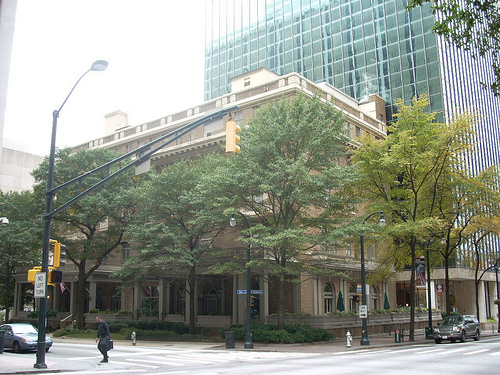
The Capital City Club in Atlanta, Georgia

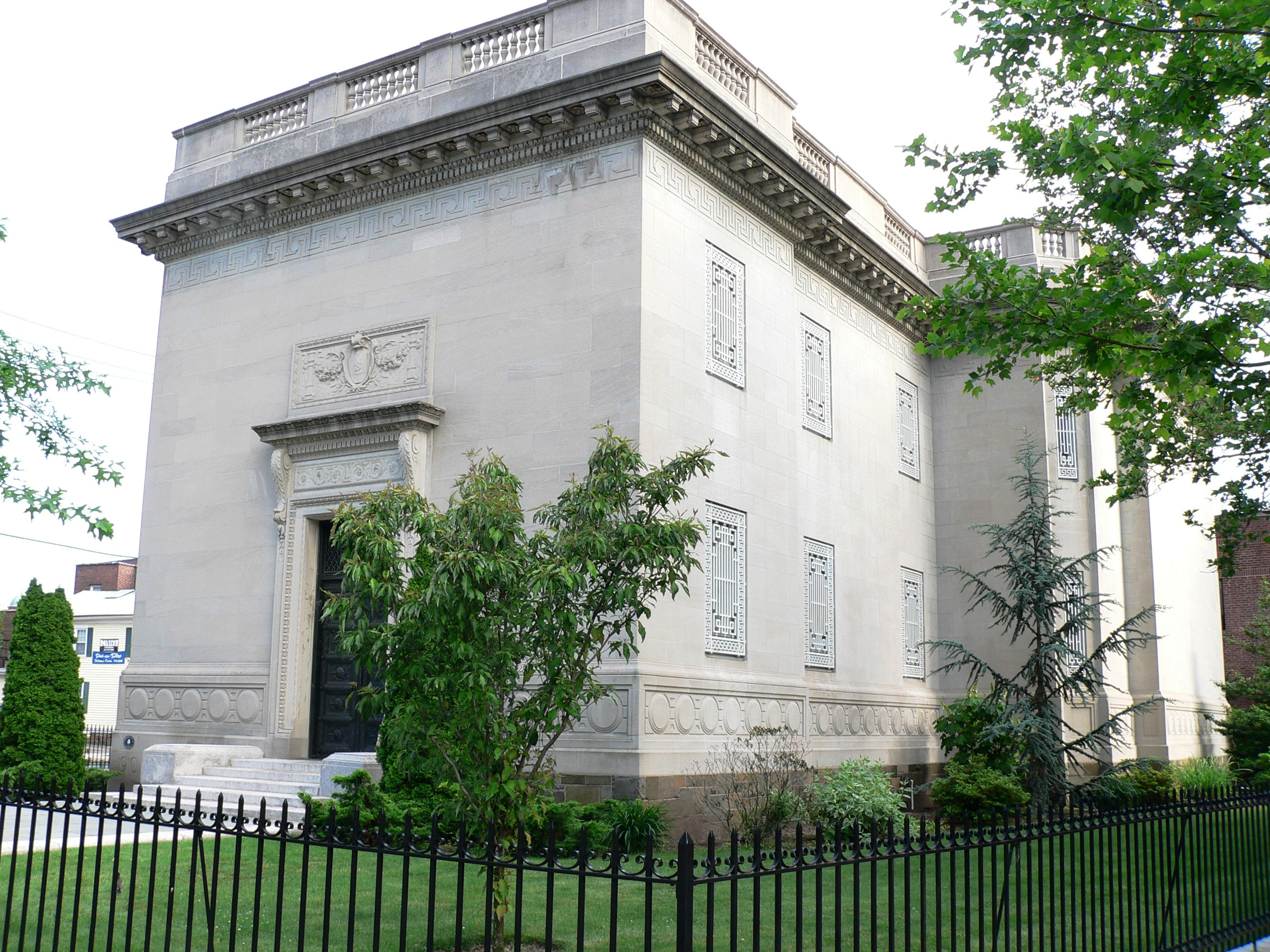
Berzelius Society Building (c. 1908) in New Haven, Connecticut

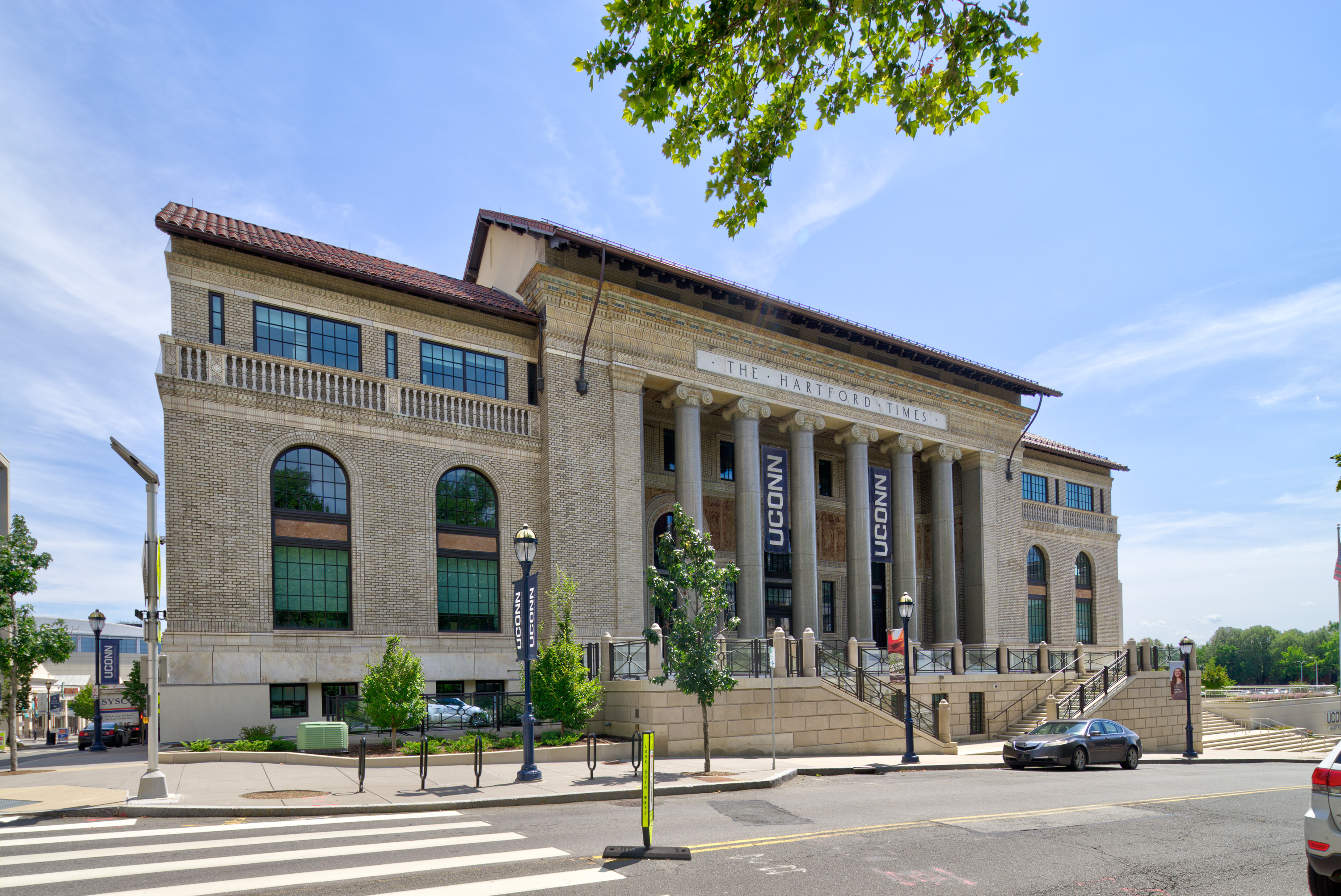
The Hartford Times Building (1920)

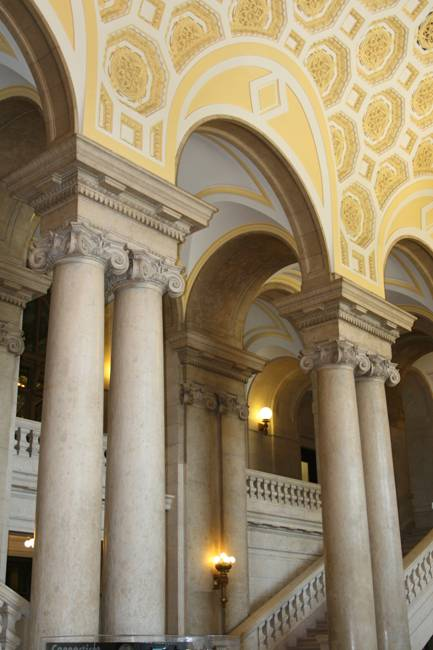
Lobby of the Connecticut State Library
