= Madison Square Presbyterian Church (1854) =

Church in Manhattan, New York

Coordinates: 40.74155°N 73.987519°W

Madison Square Presbyterian Church (1854–1906)
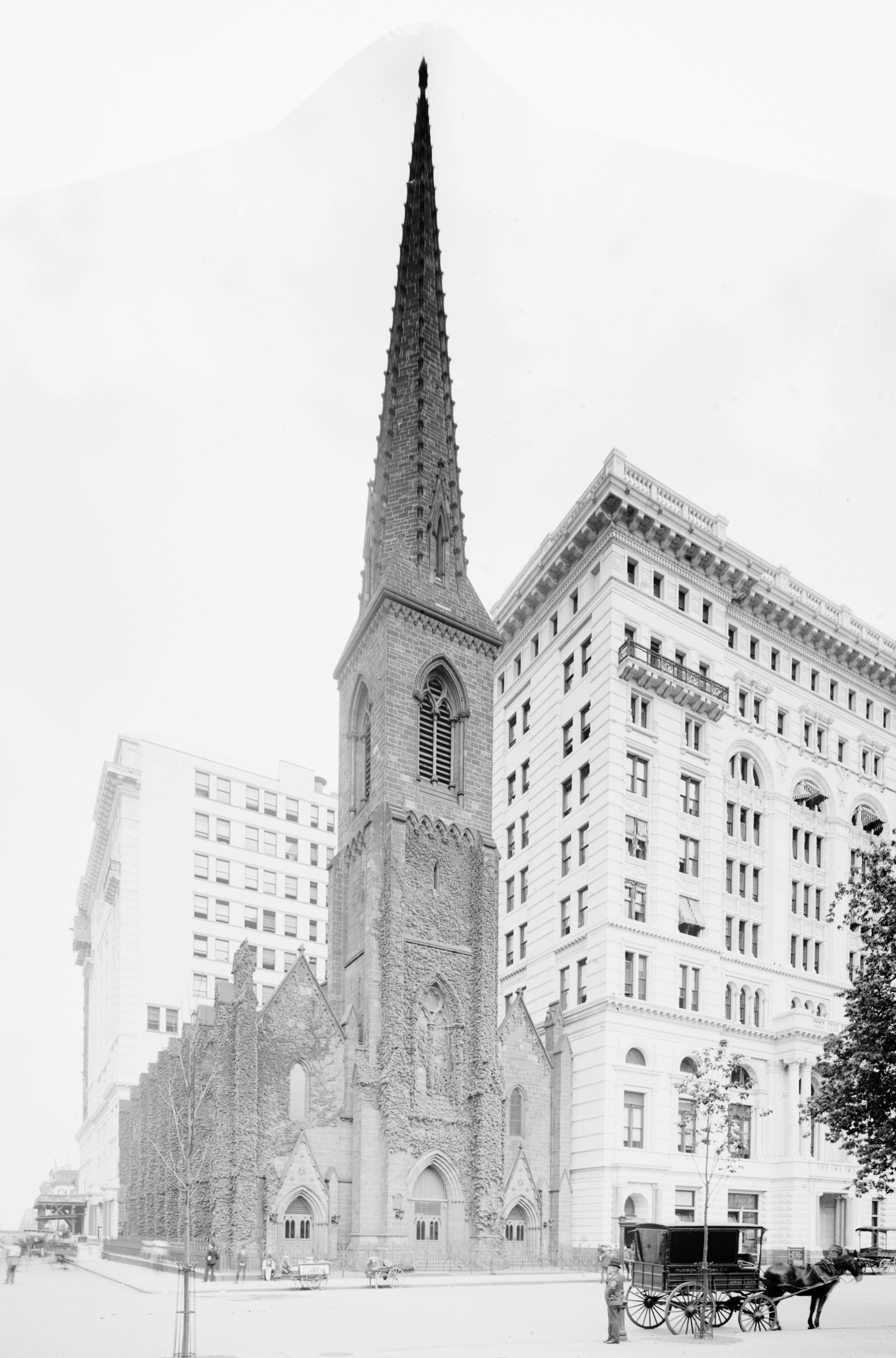
- c. 1903

General information
- Architectural style: Gothic Revival architecture
- Location: New York City, United States
- Construction started: 1853
- Completed: 1854
- Demolished: 1909
- Client: Presbyterian Church in the United States of America

Technical details
- Structural system: masonry

Design and construction
- Architect: Richard M. Upjohn

Madison Square Presbyterian Church was a Presbyterian church in Manhattan, New York City, located on Madison Square Park at the southeast corner of East 24th Street and Madison Avenue. Construction on the church began in 1853 and was completed in 1854. It was designed by Richard M. Upjohn, the son of noted architect Richard Upjohn, in the Gothic Revival architectural style. The congregation's original building was acquired by the Metropolitan Life Insurance Company and was demolished in 1909 to make way for the 48-story Metropolitan Life Insurance Company Tower. In exchange, the church received a 75 feet (23 m) by 150 feet (46 m) plot of land across 24th Street that became the site for Stanford White's Madison Square Presbyterian Church.

The congregation had been founded in 1853 by William Adams, who served as the church's pastor until 1873, when he left to take the position as president of the Union Theological Seminary in the City of New York. Funeral services for Adams were held at the church on September 3, 1880, in what was described as "a fitting tribute to a man who was recognized as the most eminent Presbyterian minister in America". His coffin was carried into the sanctuary by eight students from the Union Theological Seminary.

The cornerstone for the church was laid in ceremonies held on July 12, 1853, led by Reverend Adams. Edward Huntting Rudd was baptized there and later served as assistant pastor.

Reports had reached the leaders of the congregation in the 1890s that Metropolitan Life was interested in acquiring the site of the church so that it could consolidate its operations in the block bounded by 23rd Street, 24th Street, Madison Avenue and Park Avenue South (then known as Fourth Avenue). The elders of the church agreed that they did not want to move the congregation further uptown, but would be willing to sell the site if an appropriate location could be found near the existing church. As the years progressed, the church was increasingly affected by the construction of new office space by Metropolitan Life and became more willing to reach a compromise with their corporate neighbor. Representatives of Metropolitan Life contacted the church in May 1902 with an offer to make a lot across 24th Street, on the northeast corner of Madison Avenue, as a replacement for the original site, and an agreement was reached with the insurer later that year in which the company paid the church $325,000 that would be used towards the construction of a new church. Once the new church was completed the old building was demolished and became the site of the Metropolitan Life Insurance Company Tower, a 48-story building completed in 1909, which was the world's tallest building for three years, until 1913, when it was surpassed by the Woolworth Building.

== See also ==
- Madison Square Presbyterian Church, New York City (1906)
