= Madison Square Presbyterian Church (1906) =

Church in Manhattan, New York

Madison Square Presbyterian Church (1906–1919)
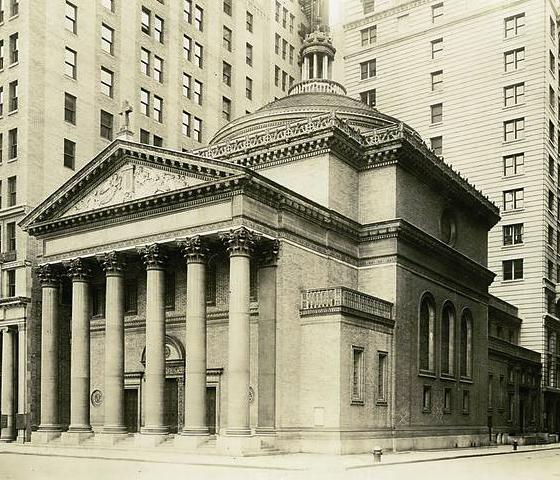

General information
- Architectural style: Beaux-Arts architecture
- Location: New York City, United States
- Coordinates: 40.74155°N 73.987519°W
- Construction started: 1904
- Completed: 1906
- Demolished: 1919
- Cost: $500,000
- Client: Presbyterian Church in the United States of America

Technical details
- Structural system: masonry

Design and construction
- Architect: Stanford White of McKim, Mead, and White

Madison Square Presbyterian Church (demolished 1919) was a Presbyterian church in Manhattan, New York City, located on Madison Square Park at the northeast corner of East 24th Street and Madison Avenue. It was designed by Stanford White in a High Renaissance architectural style, with a prominent central dome over a cubical central space in an abbreviated Greek cross plan; it was built in 1906. The inaugural service was on October 14 of that year. The congregation's church had previously been located on the opposing, southeast corner of Madison and 24th Street, in a Gothic-style structure, also called the "Madison Square Presbyterian Church", whose cornerstone was laid in 1853 and which was completed the following year. Metropolitan Life Insurance Company purchased the original site for the construction of the Metropolitan Life Insurance Company Tower, a 48-story building completed in 1909 which was the world's tallest building when it was constructed.

== Architecture ==
The new church, valued at $500,000 and called the "Parkhurst Church" after its pastor, Reverend Charles Henry Parkhurst, was described as "one of the most costly religious edifices in the city"; it was awarded the Gold Medal of Honor of the American Institute of Architects. To hold its own with the towering commercial blocks surrounding it, both built and to come, its entrance was through a portico supported by six pale green granite columns, fully 30 feet tall.

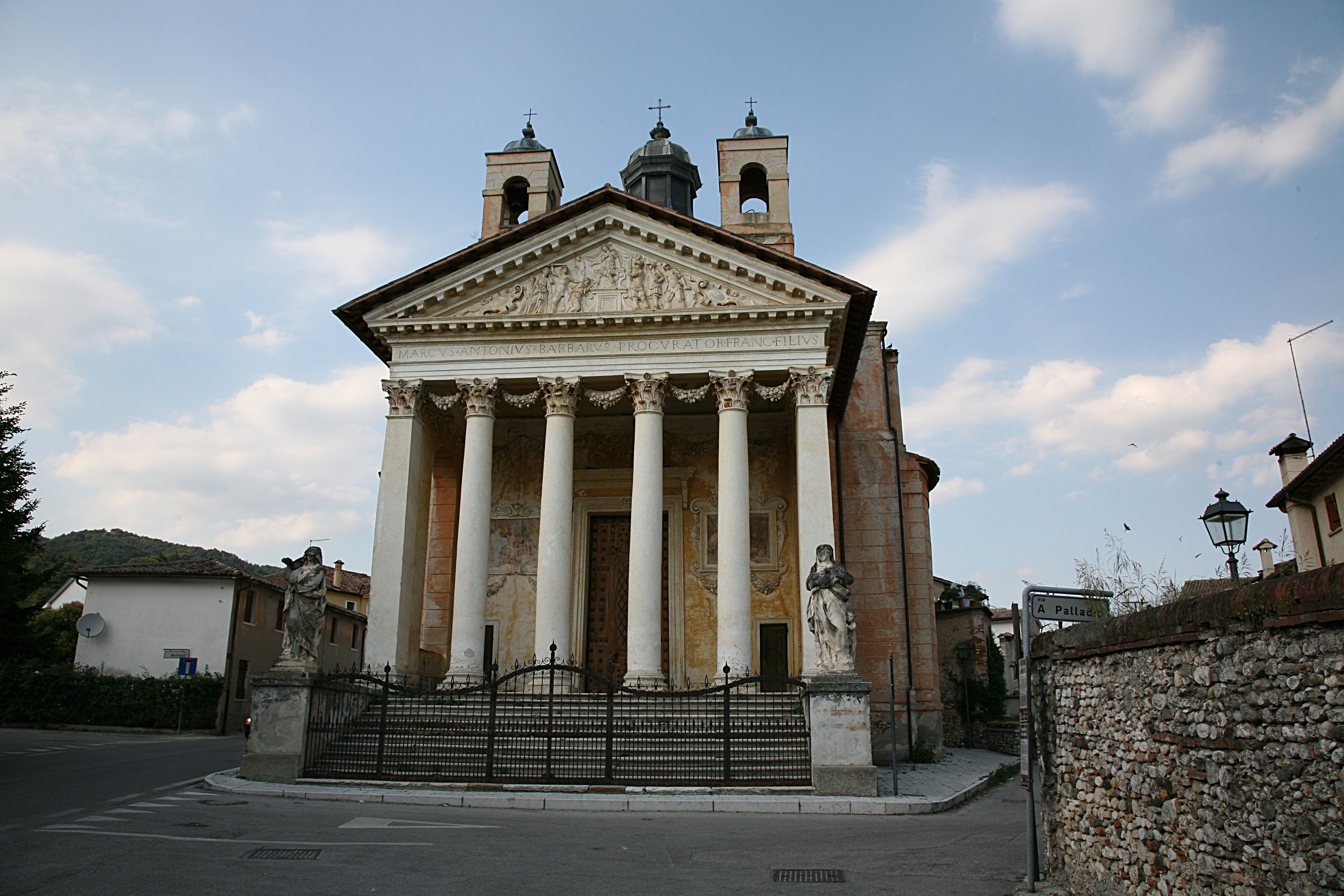
Palladio's Tempietto Barbaro

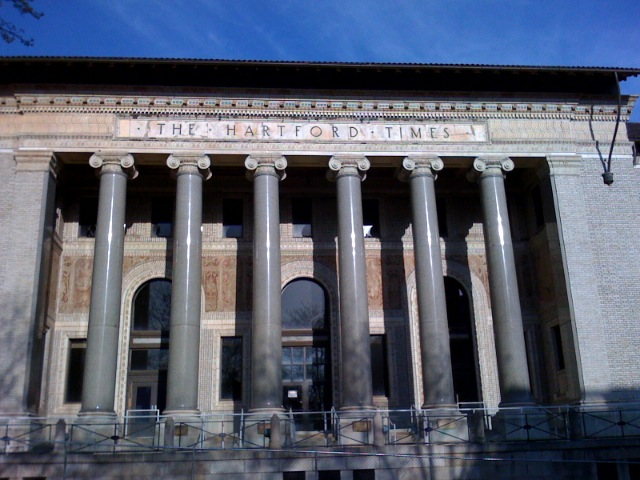
The Hartford Times Building with columns salvaged from the church

The building was raised on a marble plinth and built of specially molded bricks in two slightly varied tonalities in a diaper pattern and white and colored architectural terracotta details. It featured a low saucer dome covered in yellow and green tiling, with a prominent gilded lantern. The pediment sculptures by the German-born Adolph Alexander Weinman were tinted by the painter Henry Siddons Mowbray, giving the building a polychromy unusual in American Beaux-Arts architecture. Extensive mosaics and Guastavino tile gave the interior a Byzantine aspect,

The building's architectural style was described by a member of the firm in 1930 as "the Early Christian, with plan in the shape of the Greek cross, like the early Byzantine churches" though a modern viewer would find closer parallels in High Renaissance centrally planned churches of the 16th century, or Andrea Palladio's Tempietto at the Villa Barbaro at Maser.

== Demolition ==
After the Madison Square church's congregation was combined with other Presbyterian churches located on Fifth Avenue and on University Place, the Metropolitan Life Insurance Company purchased the 75 feet (23 m) by 150 feet (46 m) lot for $500,000, with the funds used to endow the combined churches. Metropolitan's chief architect, D. Everett Waid, a Presbyterian himself and the long time architect of the Presbyterian Board of Missions, regretting the church's pending destruction, attempted to find a church or bank that would disassemble and then reassemble the building elsewhere but to no avail. Waid arranged for friezes, cornices, and balustrades to be sent to the Columbia University School of Architecture. The pale green granite columns (but not their capitals), pilasters, and some cornices, band courses, window and door architraves were reused during the construction of the Hartford Times Building in Hartford, Connecticut (1920). The stained glass windows were repurposed for the St. Francis wedding chapel at The Mission Inn Hotel & Spa in Riverside, California. While the church's original stained glass windows, organ, seating and some flooring were transferred to the Old First Presbyterian Church, the pediment with its sculptures was re-erected on the south-facing Central Park façade of McKim, Mead, and White's Metropolitan Museum of Art, the other architectural details were left to be scavenged by the wrecking company that razed the building. When the Metropolitan Museum of Art was expanded in the 1960s, the pediment was destroyed. The New York Times described the building as having "long been recognized as one of the masterpieces of the late Stanford White" and called the church's destruction "a distinct architectural loss to the city".

The 24th Street site was demolished starting in May 1919 to make way for an 18-story annex building that Metropolitan Life constructed at a cost of $1 million, which connected to a previously built 16-story annex on the north side of the street. The earlier annex was connected to the Metropolitan Life Tower by a bridge over 24th Street. A decade later the annex buildings were leveled, and the entire block bounded by 24th Street, 25th Street, Madison Avenue and Park Avenue South became the site of the Metropolitan Life North Building, still extant, which was designed to accommodate a building as high as 80 stories, of which only 30 were constructed.
