= Arduino Berlam =

Italian architect

Arduino Berlam (1880–1946) was an Italian architect who took over the work of his father, Ruggero Berlam.

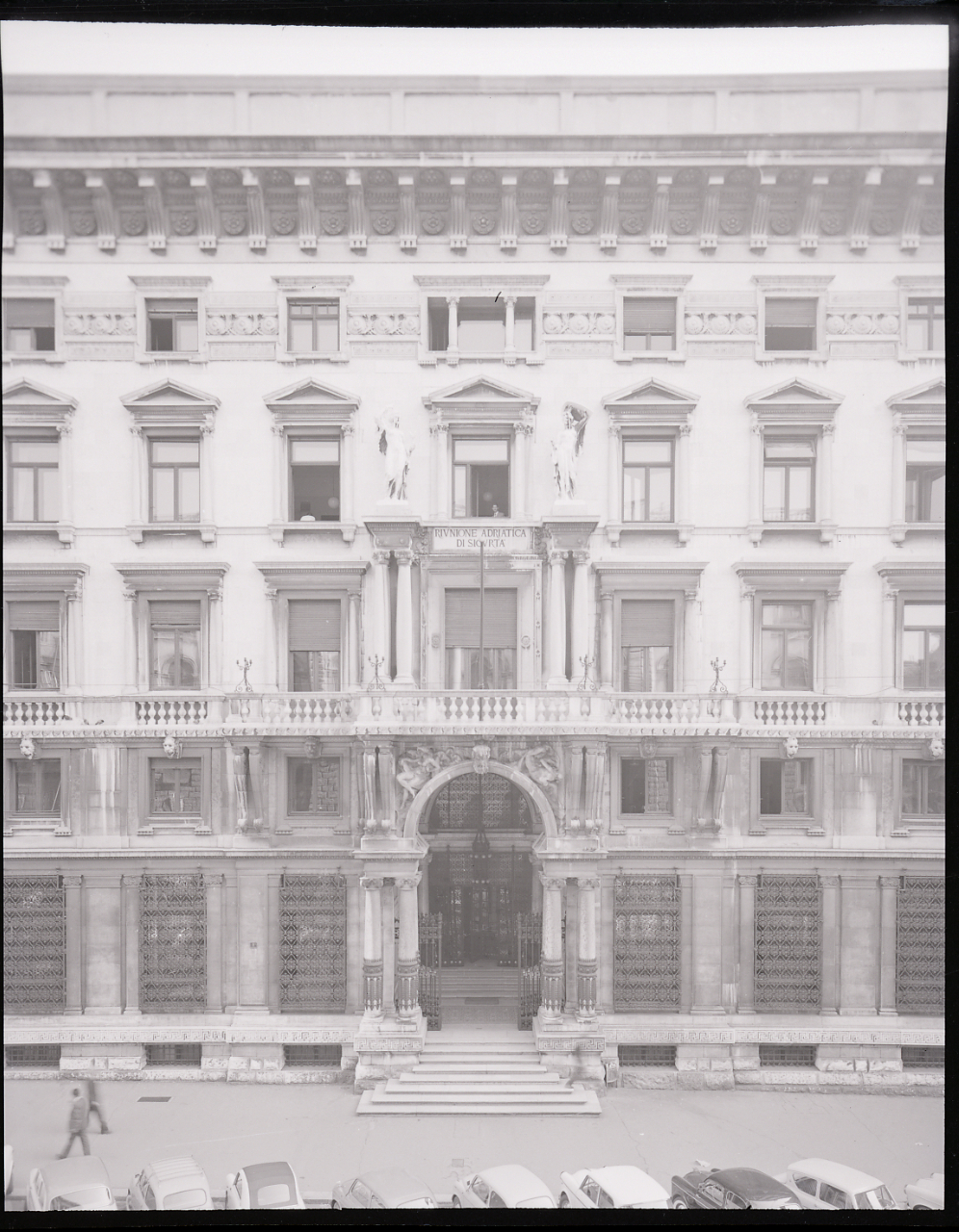
RAS Building, Trieste, detail. Photo by Paolo Monti, 1964

Born in Trieste, from 1905 he actively contributed to his father's works, creating such a harmony that experts now find it difficult to differentiate their work. Like his father and grandfather, Arduino was educated at the school of engineering and at the Brera Academy, and most active in his native town, designing not only houses and palaces, but also monuments (Victory Lighthouse and Virgil's memorial plaque at the mouths of the river Timavo), as well as the interior decoration of the famous ships Saturnia and Vulcania.

He died at Tricesimo in 1946.

== Work ==
- Palazzo Berlam designed by Arduino Berlam
- Porec Town Hall
- Hilton Trieste in Piazza della Repubblica
- RAS Palace
- Synagogue of Trieste
