= Ruggero Berlam =

Italian architect

Ruggero Berlam (20 September 1854 – 22 October 1920) was an Austrian architect.

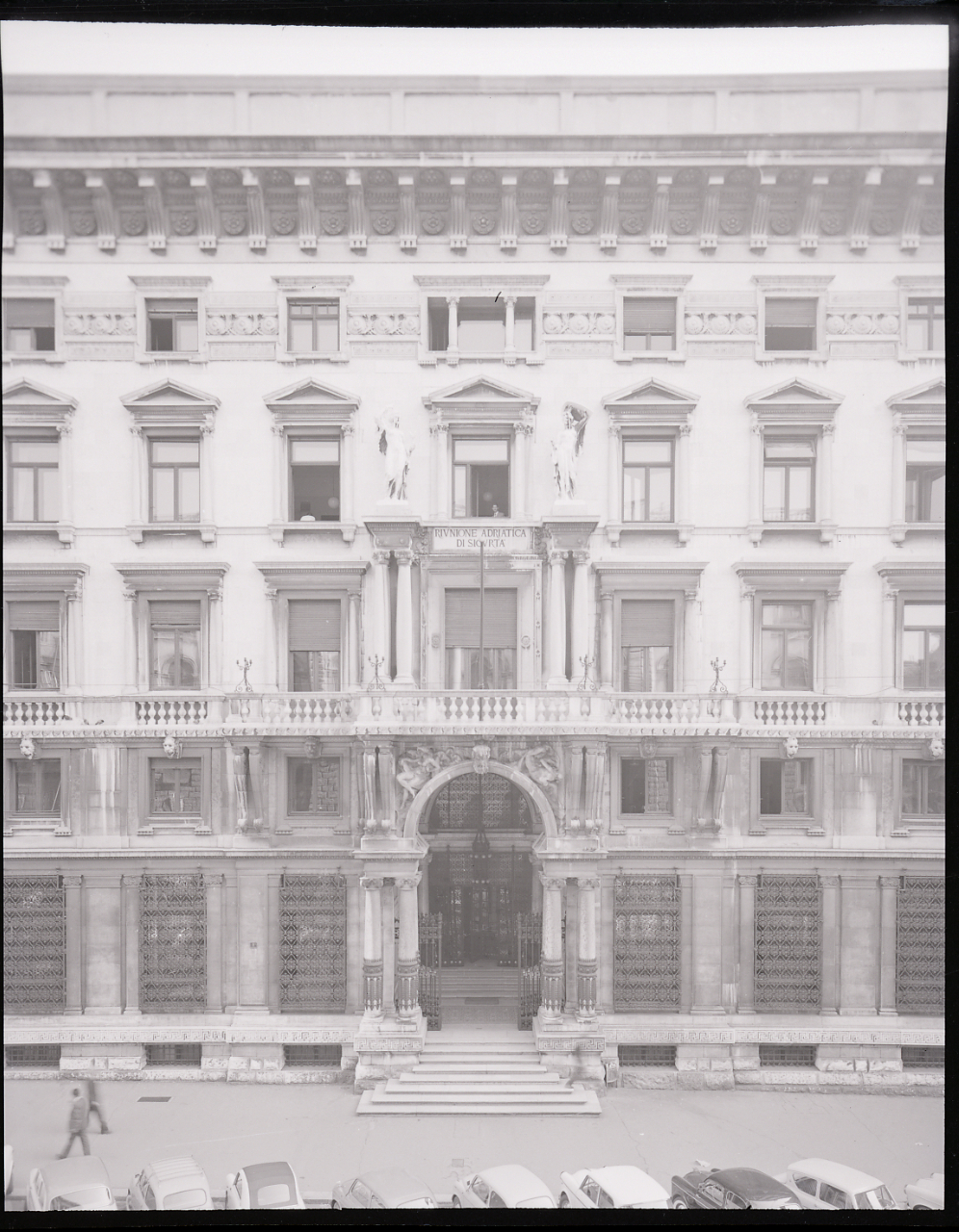
RAS Building, Trieste, detail. Photo by Paolo Monti, 1964

Born in Trieste (then part of the Austro-Hungarian Empire), he followed in the family tradition, as his father Giovanni Andrea had already stood out as architect with buildings like Palace Gopcevich near the seafront in Trieste. Ruggero Berlam was also skillful designer-painter. He completed his education in Milan at the Brera Academy, where he was taught by Camillo Boito that architecture should "be linked to an Italian style of the past, lose then the archaeological features of that style and become completely modern": this lesson can be considered the summary of all Berlam's works between 1880 and 1920, when he died.

From 1905 his son Arduino actively contributed to his father's works.

One notable building designed by Berlam today in his home city is the Synagogue of Trieste.
