= MetLife (disambiguation) =

MetLife is a life insurance company.

MetLife may also refer to:

- MetLife Stadium, a stadium shared by the New York Giants and New York Jets
- MetLife Building, a building in Midtown Manhattan, New York City
- MetLife Tower, a landmark building across from Madison Square Park in Manhattan, New York City
