= Sony Corporation of America =

American subsidiary of Japan's Sony Corporation

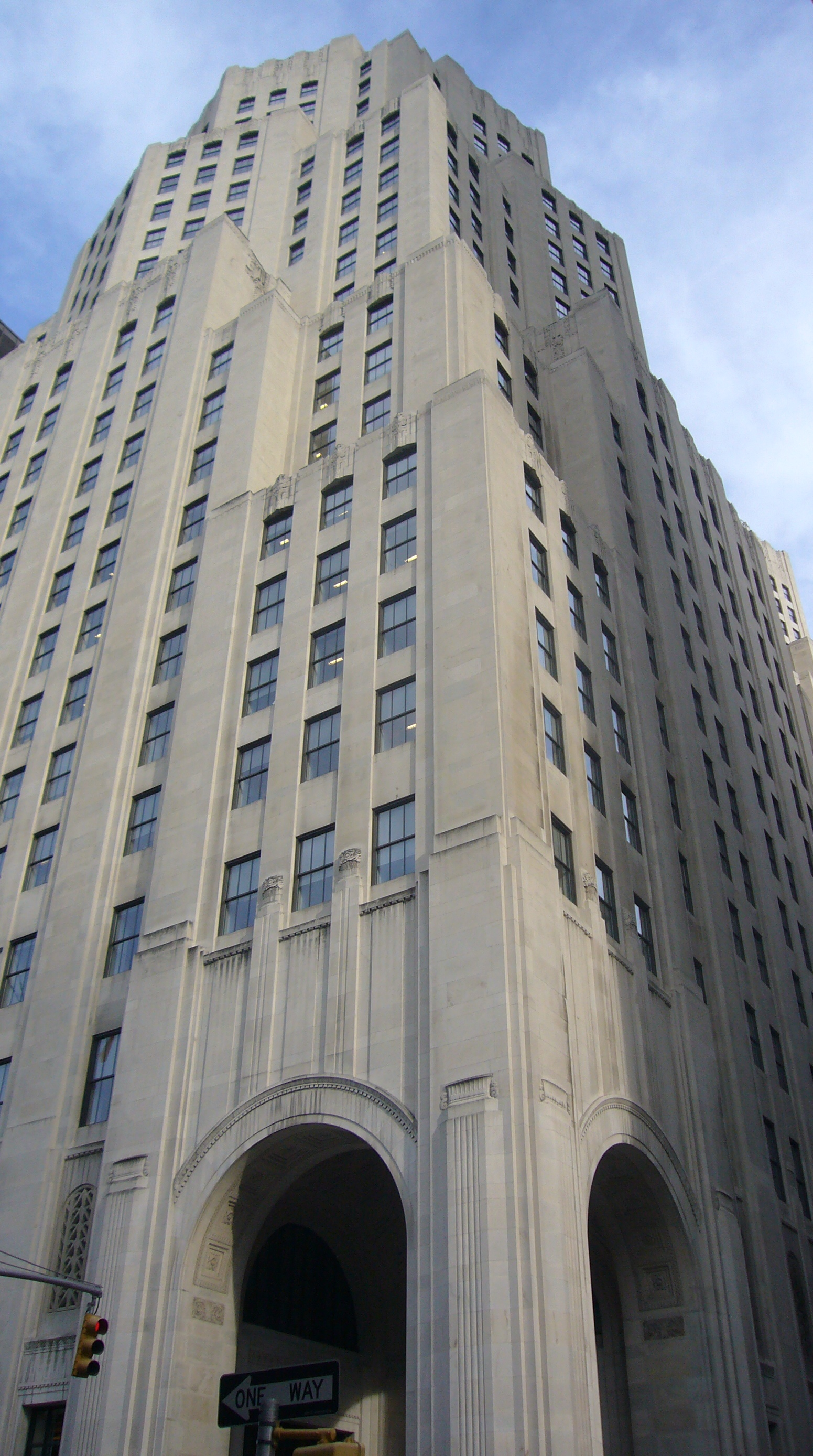
- Sony Corporation of America's headquarters located at 25 Madison Avenue, New York City
- Type: Subsidiary
- Industry: Electronics; Entertainment; Television
- Founded: February 8, 1960; 66 years ago
- Founder: Akio Morita
- Headquarters: 25 Madison Avenue, New York City, U.S.
- Key people: Hiroki Totoki (president and CEO); Karen L. Halby (president); Steven Kober (executive vice president and CFO)
- Number of employees: 33,234
- Parent: Sony Group Corporation
- Subsidiaries: See § Subsidiaries
- Website: sony.com/SCA

Sony Corporation of America (SONAM, also known as SCA) is the American arm of Japanese multinational conglomerate Sony Group Corporation. Headquartered in New York City, the company manages Sony's business in the United States.

Sony's principal U.S. businesses include Sony Corporation, Sony Interactive Entertainment, Sony Music Group and Sony Pictures Entertainment.

It was reported in December 2016 by multiple news outlets that Sony was considering restructuring its U.S. operations by merging its television and film business, Sony Pictures Entertainment, with its gaming business, Sony Interactive Entertainment. According to the reports, such a restructuring would have placed Sony Pictures under Sony Interactive's then CEO, Andrew House, though he would not have assumed day-to-day operations of the film studio. According to one report, Sony was set to make a final decision on the possibility of the merger of the television, film and gaming businesses by the end of its fiscal year in March of the following year (2017). By January 2020, nothing had materialized.

== Investments in the United States ==
Sony Group Corporation has been investing in the United States since the 1960s. Sony has made significant investments in various industries and has established a strong presence in the American market.

One of Sony's most notable investments in the US is in the entertainment industry. Sony Pictures Entertainment, a subsidiary of Sony Corporation, is a major player in the American film and television industry. The company produces, finances, and distributes a wide variety of content, including feature films, television shows, and streaming content. Sony Pictures has produced many successful and critically acclaimed movies, such as the Spider-Man and Jumanji franchises, as well as television shows like Breaking Bad and The Blacklist.

In addition to the entertainment industry, Sony has also invested heavily in the gaming industry in the United States. Sony Interactive Entertainment, another subsidiary of Sony Corporation, is the company behind the PlayStation gaming console. The PlayStation has been a major player in the gaming market for decades and has consistently been one of the top-selling gaming consoles in the United States.

Sony has also made investments in the technology and electronics industries in the United States. The company has manufacturing facilities and research and development centers in various states across the country, where they produce a wide range of products, including televisions, cameras, and audio equipment.

Sony Corporation has made significant investments in the United States across multiple industries, including entertainment, gaming, technology, and electronics. The company's subsidiaries, such as Sony Pictures Entertainment and Sony Interactive Entertainment, have established a strong presence in the American market and have contributed to the growth of these industries. Sony's investments in the US have been successful and have helped to solidify the company's position as a major player in the global market. Sony is the tenth largest foreign direct investor in the United States, with investments worth more than $90 billion. In 2021, more than half of Sony Corporation's revenue came from companies based in the United States.

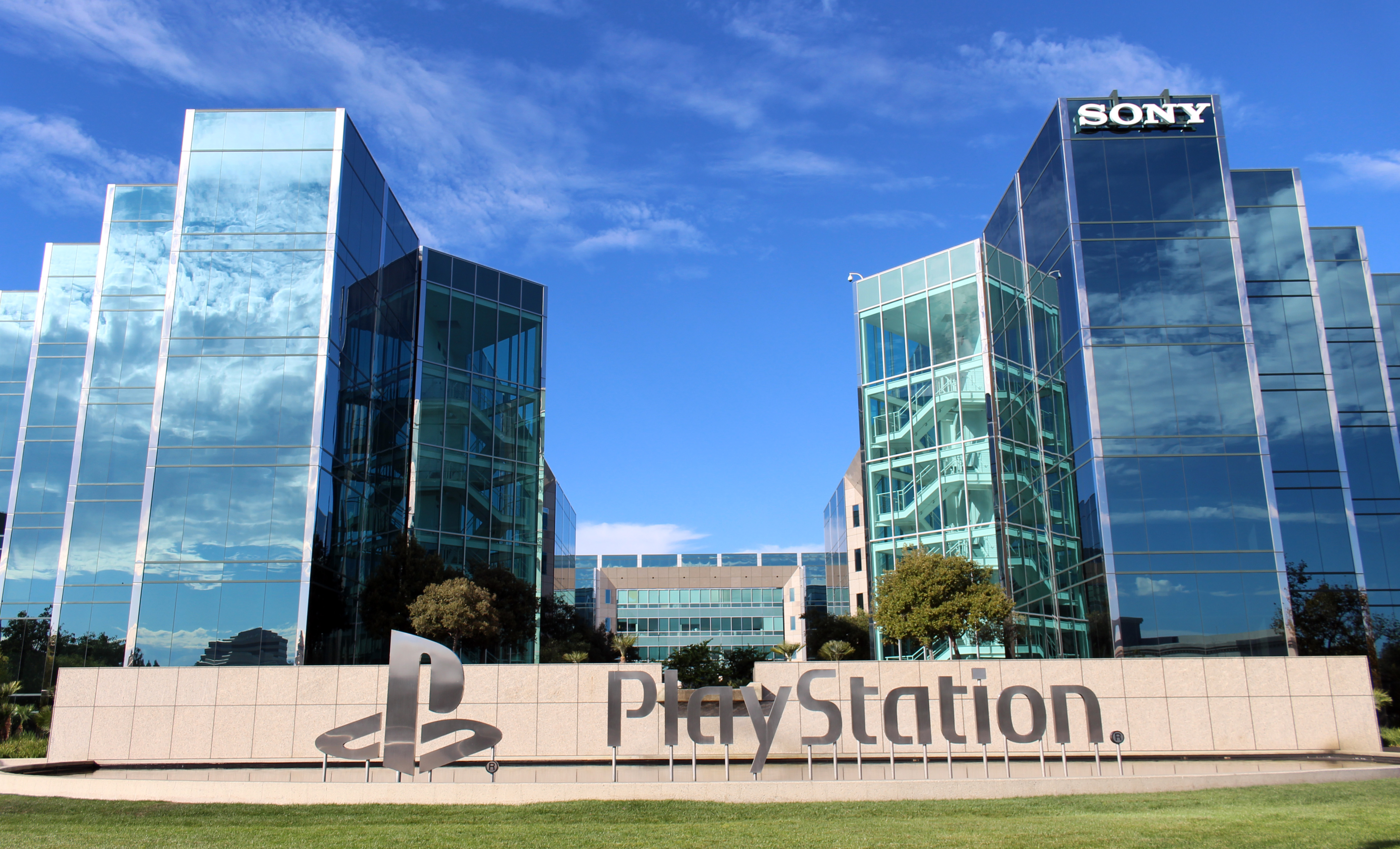
Sony Interactive Entertainment headquarters in San Mateo, California

=== Sony Interactive Entertainment ===
In 2016, Sony moved PlayStation, Sony's biggest brand by revenue, to the United States. The largest acquisition by Sony Corporation was American video game company Bungie for $3.7 billion in 2022. The PlayStation 4 was the most profitable console ever, selling over 117 million units, making it the fourth best-selling console of all time. God of War became one of the 50 best-selling games of all time, selling 23 million units by November 2022. Sony Interactive Entertainment's revenue was $25 billion in 2021. The PS5 became Sony's fastest-selling and most profitable console ever.

=== Sony Pictures ===
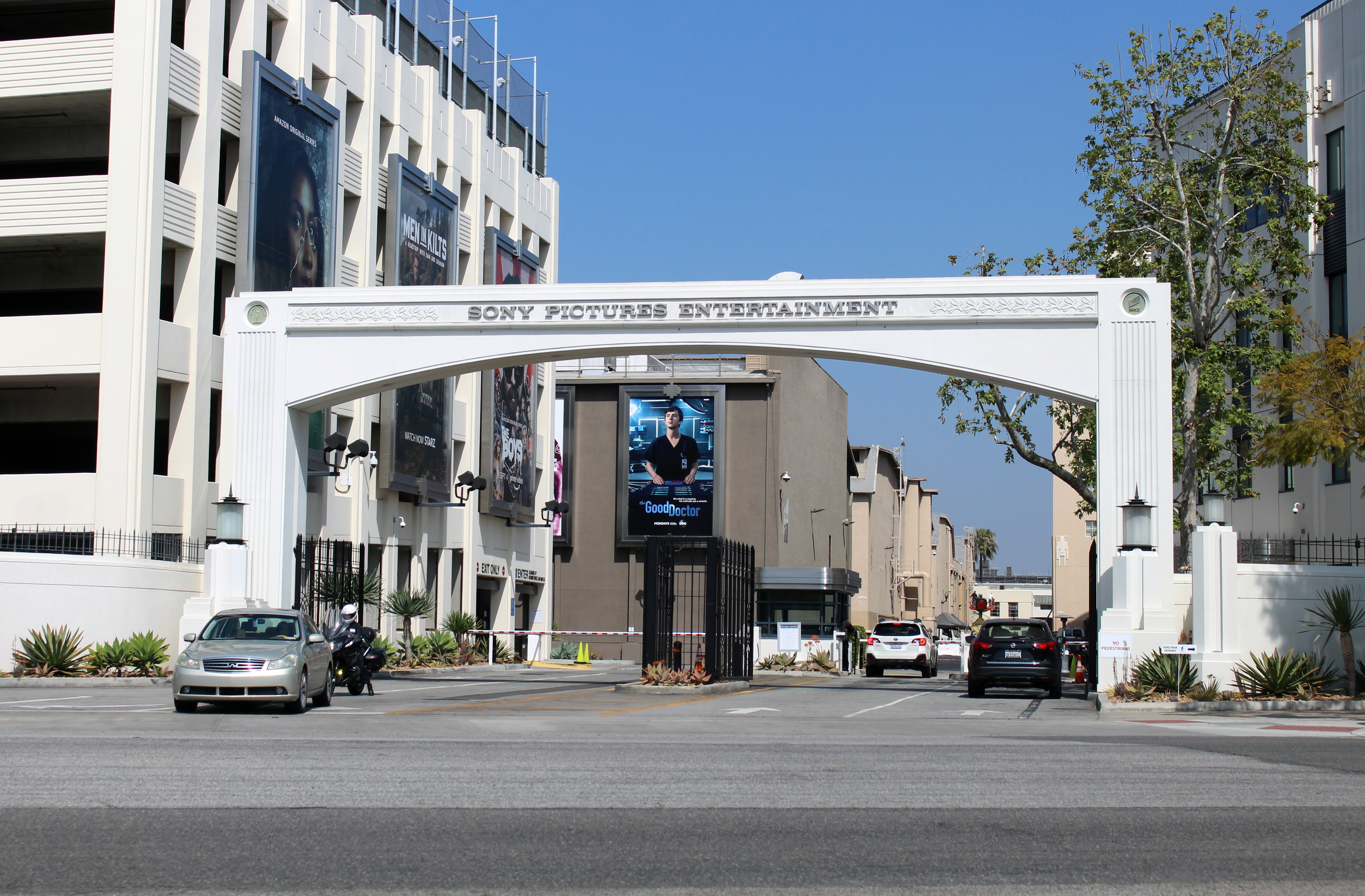
Sony Pictures Entertainment headquarters in Culver City, California

On November 9, 1989, Sony entered the film industry by acquiring Columbia Pictures for $3.4 billion. Columbia Pictures is considered one of the "Big Five" major American film studios. In 2021, Sony Pictures Entertainment became the highest earning film production company in the United States.

In 1999, Sony acquired the intellectual property (IP) movie rights to Spider-Man from Marvel Entertainment for $7 million. The Spider-Man film franchise has grossed more than $9.8 billion, making it the fifth highest-grossing film franchise in history. In 2021, Spider-Man: No Way Home became the seventh highest-grossing film of all time.

On April 18, 2024, reports surfaced indicating Sony Pictures' interest in acquiring American media company Paramount Global through a joint buyout with Apollo Global Management. In May 2024, Sony Pictures and Apollo made an offer to acquire Paramount Global for $26 billion in cash. The New York Times reported that the board of directors of Paramount Global formally initiated negotiations for the potential sale of the company with Sony and Apollo. If the merger occurs, Sony would become as the third-largest movie company globally, following behind NBCUniversal and The Walt Disney Company, with Sony holding a 20.81% share in the US and Canada markets alone and Paramount Pictures becoming a sibling studio to Columbia Pictures and TriStar Pictures. However, Skydance Media eventually became the emerging winner for the merger of Paramount.

=== Sony Music ===
On January 5, 1988, Sony entered the music industry by acquiring Sony Music (formerly CBS Records) for $2 Billion. With the $8.9 billion revenue in 2021, Sony Music Entertainment is the second largest of the "Big Three" record companies, behind Universal Music Group and followed by Warner Music Group.

== List of American companies acquired by Sony ==
Acquired	Company	Business	Value	References
July 15, 2022	Bungie	Video games	$3.7 billion	
November 8, 1989	Columbia Pictures	Movies/Television	$3.4 billion	
January 5, 1988	CBS Records	Music	$2 billion	
August 9, 2021	Crunchyroll	Video streaming service	$1.17 billion	
November 18, 2019	Game Show Network	Basic cable channel	$500 million	
March 16, 2022	AWAL, Kobalt Neighboring Rights	Music	$430 million	
July 2, 2012	Gaikai	Cloud gaming	$380 million	
March 3, 2022	Industrial Media	Entertainment	$350 million	
August 19, 2019	Insomniac Games	Video games	$229 million	
November 9, 1989	Guber-Peters Entertainment	Movies/Television	$200 million	
June 12, 2024	Alamo Drafthouse Cinema	Entertainment	$200 million	
December 10, 2019	Sony Pictures Television Kids	Movies/Television	$195 million	
July 9, 2002	Acuff-Rose Music	Music publishing	$157 million	
July 31, 2017	Funimation	Entertainment	$143 million	
January 22, 2001	Naughty Dog	Video games		
December 1, 2000	Bend Studio	Video games		
August 2, 2011	Sucker Punch Productions	Video games		
March 18, 2021	EVO Championship	Esports		
September 30, 2021	Bluepoint Games	Video games		
July 18, 2022	Repeat.gg	Esports		
March 5, 2012	The Orchard	Music		
August 4, 2022	Right Stuf	Video publishing		
December 23, 2012	Ultra Records	Music		
October 25, 2022	Pixomondo	Visual effects		
April 20, 2023	Firewalk Studios	Video games		
August 24, 2023	Audeze	Music		

=== List of stakes owned by Sony in American companies ===
In 2022, Sony announced that it will invest more than 1 billion in Epic Games. In total, Sony's total investment in Epic Games is worth 1.45 billion and they own 4.9% of Epic Games.

Company	Business	Value	Stakes %	References
Epic Games	Video games	$1.45 billion	5.4%	
Discord	Communication	$100 million	1.4%	
Devolver Digital	Video games	$50 million	5.03%	

== Former ==
=== Sony Entertainment ===
Sony Entertainment, Inc. dates back to March 30, 2012, when Michael Lynton, then-co-chairman and CEO of Sony Pictures Entertainment, and executive vice president and general counsel of Sony, Nicole Seligman, were respectively named as CEO and president of Sony Corporation of America to oversee all of Sony's global entertainment businesses. On April 9, 2013, Lynton renewed his contract with Sony and was elevated to the presidency at Sony Entertainment.

On January 13, 2017, Lynton announced that he was stepping down as CEO of Sony Entertainment and Sony Pictures and chairman of the latter to become chairman for Snap Inc. and was later replaced by Sony Pictures chairman and CEO Anthony Vinciquerra on 11 May 2017.

News outlets including the New York Post, Complete Music Update and TheStreet reported on December 19, 2016, about Sony was considering a restructuring of its American operations by merging Sony Pictures with Sony Interactive Entertainment which would have placed Sony Pictures under Sony Interactive's then-CEO, Andrew House, though House wouldn't have taken over day-to-day operations of Sony Pictures. However, a Sony spokesperson denounced any sort of planned merger or restructuring of any of the Sony media divisions at that time in an interview with the latter source.

In 2019, Sony Entertainment, which had been operating as three separate companies (Sony Music Entertainment, Sony/ATV Music Publishing and Sony Pictures Entertainment), although on an integrated basis, underwent a fundamental restructuring. The music assets were consolidated under Sony Music Group while Sony Pictures Entertainment was divested as a standalone company, effectively dissolving the umbrella entertainment unit.

== Subsidiaries ==
- Sony Pictures Entertainment Inc.
  - Sony Pictures Entertainment Japan
  - Sony Pictures Motion Picture Group
  - Sony Pictures Home Entertainment Inc.
  - Sony Pictures Television Inc.
  - Sony Pictures Experiences
- Sony Music Group
  - Sony Music Entertainment
  - Sony Music Publishing LLC
- Sony Interactive Entertainment LLC
- Sony DADC US Inc.
- Sony Mobile Communications (USA) Inc. (Sony Mobile Communications Inc.)
- Sony Immersive Music Entertainment (Sony Corporation of America)

=== Other subsidiaries ===
- Sony Plaza Public Arcade (New York City, New York)
- Sony Optical Archive (formerly Optical Archive, San Jose, California)
- Sony Biotechnology (formerly iCyt Mission Technology, Champaign, Illinois)
- Micronics, Inc. (Redmond, Washington)
