= Sony Music Group =

American multinational music company

- Logo used since 2023
- Type: Subsidiary
- Industry: Music
- Genre: Various
- Founded: August 1, 2019; 7 years ago
- Headquarters: 25 Madison Avenue, New York City, U.S.
- Area served: Worldwide
- Key people: Rob Stringer (chairman)
- Products: Music; Entertainment
- Revenue: US$ 9,2 billion (FY24)
- Parent: Sony Group Corporation
- Subsidiaries: Sony Music Entertainment; Sony Music Publishing
- Website: sonymusic.com

Sony Music Group (SMG) is an American, Japanese-owned, multinational music company which is a subsidiary of Japanese conglomerate Sony Group Corporation. Sony Music Group is one of the "Big Four" major music companies. It was established on August 1, 2019, with headquarters in New York City and an office in Culver City, California.

It controls Sony's entire music business outside of Japan through its American subsidiaries Sony Music Entertainment and Sony Music Publishing.

Sony Music Group is the second largest music company in the world after Universal Music Group.

Former logo used from 2021 to 2023
