= Sony Music =

American multinational music corporation

Sony Music Entertainment
- Formerly: American Record Corporation (1929–1938); Columbia Record Corporation (1938–1966); CBS Records Group (1966–1991); Sony Music Entertainment, Inc. (first incarnation; 1991–2004); Sony BMG Music Entertainment (2004–2008)
- Type: Subsidiary
- Industry: Music
- Genre: Various
- Predecessors: Consolidated Talking Machine Company (1900–1901); Victor Talking Machine Company (1901–1929); RCA Victor (1929–1968); RCA Records (1968–1985); Bertelsmann Music Group (1985–2004)
- Founded: September 9, 1929; 97 years ago (as American Record Corporation)
- Headquarters: 25 Madison Avenue, New York City, United States
- Area served: Worldwide (except for Russia)
- Key people: Rob Stringer (CEO); Kevin Kelleher (COO)
- Revenue: ▲US$13.3 billion (FY 2026)
- Operating income: ▲US$2.82 billion (FY 2026)
- Number of employees: 11,400 (FY 2026)
- Parent: CBS (1938–1988); Sony Corporation of America (1988–2012); Bertelsmann (2004–2008)(50%); Sony Entertainment (2012–2019); Sony Music Group (2019–present)
- Divisions: See List of Sony Music Entertainment labels
- Website: sonymusic.com

Sony Music Entertainment (SME), commonly known as Sony Music, is an American multinational music corporation owned by Sony Group Corporation. It is the recording subsidiary of Sony Music Group, with the other half being the publishing subsidiary, Sony Music Publishing.

Founded in 1929 as American Record Corporation, it was acquired by the Columbia Broadcasting System (CBS) in 1938 and renamed Columbia Recording Corporation. In 1966, the company was reorganized as CBS Records, Inc. Sony bought the company in 1988 and renamed it Sony Music in 1991. In 2004, Sony and Bertelsmann established a 50–50 joint venture known as Sony BMG to handle the operations of Sony Music and Bertelsmann Music Group (BMG). Sony bought out Bertelsmann's stake four years later and reverted to using the Sony Music name. This buyout led to labels formerly under BMG ownership, including Arista, Jive, LaFace and J Records, being absorbed into RCA Records in 2011. Arista Records and Jive Records would later be revived under Sony in 2018 and 2026, respectively.

On July 17, 2019, Sony announced a merger of Sony Music Entertainment and music publishing arm Sony/ATV (now Sony Music Publishing) to form the Sony Music Group. The merger was completed on August 1, 2019.

As of 2026, Sony Music Entertainment is the second largest of the "Big Four" record companies, with a valuation of $25 billion, behind Universal Music Group and followed by Warner Music Group. Its Sony Music Publishing division is the largest music publisher in the world.

== History ==
=== 1929–1938: American Record Corporation ===
The American Record Corporation (ARC) was founded in 1929 through a merger of several record companies. The company grew over the next several years, acquiring other brands such as the Columbia Phonograph Company, including its Okeh Records subsidiary, in 1934.

=== 1938–1970: Columbia/CBS Records ===
In 1938, ARC was acquired by the Columbia Broadcasting System (CBS) under the guidance of chief executive William S. Paley. The company was later renamed Columbia Recording Corporation, and changed again to Columbia Record Corporation in 1947. Edward Wallerstein, who had been the head of Columbia Records since the late 1930s, helped establish the company as a leader in the record industry by spearheading the successful introduction of the LP record. Columbia's success continued through the 1950s with the launch of Epic Records in 1953 and Date Records in 1958. By 1962, the Columbia Records productions unit was operating four plants around the United States, located in Los Angeles, California; Terre Haute, Indiana; Bridgeport, Connecticut; and Pitman, New Jersey.

Columbia's international arm was launched in 1962 under the name CBS Records, as the company only owned the rights to the Columbia name in North America. In 1964, the company began acquiring record companies in other countries for its CBS Records unit, and established its own UK distribution outfit with the acquisition of Oriole Records.

By 1966, Columbia Record Corporation was renamed CBS Records as a separate unit of the CBS-Columbia Group. In March 1968, CBS and Sony formed CBS/Sony Records, a Japanese joint venture.

=== 1971–1991: CBS Records Group ===
In 1971, CBS Records was expanded into its own "CBS Records Group", with Clive Davis as administrative vice president and general manager. From the 1980s to the early 1990s, the company managed several successful labels, including CBS Associated Records, which signed artists including Ozzy Osbourne, the Fabulous Thunderbirds, Electric Light Orchestra, Joan Jett, and Henry Lee Summer. In 1983, CBS expanded its music publishing business by acquiring the music publishing arm of MGM/UA Entertainment Co. CBS later sold the print music arm to Columbia Pictures. By 1987, CBS was the only "Big Three" American television network to have a co-owned record company. With Sony being one of the developers behind the compact disc digital music media, a compact disc production plant was constructed in Japan under the joint venture, allowing CBS to begin supplying some of the first compact disc releases for the American market in 1983.

In 1986, CBS sold its music publishing division, CBS Songs, to SBK Entertainment. On November 17, 1987, Sony acquired CBS Records for US$2 billion. CBS Inc. granted a transitional brand licensing agreement with Sony to retain use of the CBS Records name until it found a new trademark for the division. The sale was completed on January 5, 1988. CBS Corporation founded a new CBS Records in 2006, which was distributed by Sony through its RED subsidiary.

In 1989, CBS Records re-entered the music publishing business by acquiring Nashville-based Tree International Publishing.

=== 1991–2004: Sony Music Entertainment ===
SME logo used from 1991 to 2004

On January 1, 1991, Sony renamed the record company Sony Music Entertainment (SME), fulfilling the terms set under the 1988 buyout, which granted only a transitional license to the CBS trademark. The CBS Associated label was renamed Epic Associated. To replace the CBS label, Sony reintroduced the Columbia label worldwide; it previously held the trademark to the label in the United States and Canada only, after it acquired the international rights to the trademark from EMI in 1990. Japan is the only country where Sony does not have rights to the Columbia name as it is controlled by Nippon Columbia, an unrelated company. The Columbia trademark's rightsholder in Spain was Bertelsmann Music Group of Germany, which Sony Music subsequently subsumed via a 2004 merger and a subsequent 2008 buyout.

In 1995, Sony and pop singer Michael Jackson formed a joint venture that merged Sony's music publishing operations with Jackson's ATV Music to form Sony/ATV Music Publishing.

=== 2004–2008: Sony BMG ===
BMG logo used from 2002 to 2004

Sony BMG logo used from 2004 to 2008

In August 2004, Sony entered a joint venture with equal partner Bertelsmann by merging Sony Music and Bertelsmann Music Group to establish Sony BMG Music Entertainment. However, Sony continued to operate its Japanese music business independently from Sony BMG, and BMG Japan was made part of the merger.

The merger made Columbia and Epic sister labels to RCA Records, which was once owned by CBS rival NBC. It also started the process of bringing BMG's Arista Records back under common ownership with its former parent Columbia Pictures (a Sony division since 1989), and brought Arista founder Clive Davis back into the fold.

In 2008, Sony BMG appointed Davis as chief creative officer, a position he held until his death in 2026.

=== 2008–present: Sony Music revival and restructuring ===
On August 5, 2008, Sony Corporation of America and Bertelsmann announced that Sony had agreed to acquire Bertelsmann's 50% stake in Sony BMG. The acquisition was completed on October 1, 2008, with the company being renamed Sony Music Entertainment Inc. On July 1, 2009, SME and IODA announced a strategic partnership to leverage worldwide online retail distribution networks and complementary technologies to support independent labels and music rights holders. In March 2010, Sony Corporation partnered with The Michael Jackson Company in a contract of more than $250 million, the largest deal in recorded music history.

In February 2012, Sony Music reportedly closed its Filipino office due to piracy. In early 2018, SME resumed its operations in the Philippines, with the new offices located in Ortigas Center, Pasig. In July 2013, Sony Music withdrew from the Greek market due to an economic crisis. Albums released by Sony Music in Greece from domestic and foreign artists were carried by Feelgood Records. In 2024, Sony Music re-established direct operations in Greece after acquiring independent label Cobalt Music, which had previously been spun off from Universal Music Group after the latter's acquisition of Minos EMI

From 2009 to 2020, Sony owned 50% of Syco Entertainment, which operates some of the world's most successful reality TV formats, including Got Talent and The X Factor with Simon Cowell. Cowell acquired Sony's stake in 2020.

Doug Morris, former head of Warner Music Group and later Universal Music, became chairman and CEO of Sony Music Entertainment on July 1, 2011. Sony Music underwent restructuring upon Morris's arrival, with some artists switching labels and other labels eliminated.

In June 2012, a consortium led by Sony/ATV acquired EMI Music Publishing, making Sony/ATV the world's largest music publisher at the time. This acquisition also reunited the common ownership of the pre-1986 CBS Songs (as SBK Songs) catalog with Sony/ATV.

On April 1, 2017, Rob Stringer, previously chairman and CEO of Columbia Records, became CEO of Sony Music.

In June 2017, Sony announced it would be producing vinyl records internally by March 2018 for the first time since ceasing its production in 1989. Reporting the decision, the BBC noted that "Sony's move comes a few months after it equipped its Tokyo studio with a cutting lathe, used to produce the master discs needed for manufacturing vinyl records," but added that "Sony is even struggling to find older engineers who know how to make records".

On February 5, 2019, a group of 1970s-era musicians, including David Johansen and John Waite, filed lawsuits accusing Sony Music and Universal Music Group of improperly refusing to let them reclaim the rights to songs they had signed away earlier in their careers. The lawsuit cites U.S. copyright law, which gives artists who formerly bargained away their rights on unfavorable terms a chance to reclaim those rights by filing termination notices after 35 years. The plaintiffs claimed that Sony and UMG had "routinely and systematically" ignored hundreds of notices, having taken the position that recordings are "works made for hire" and are therefore not subject to being reclaimed.

In 2022, Sony Music acquired British company Somethin' Else to form a global podcast division with offices in New York, Los Angeles, and London. Somethin' Else principals Steve Ackerman and Jez Nelson were named heads of the division. In 2024, Sony Music acquired podcast production company Neon Hum Media.

In 2022, Sony Music acquired boutique branding and merchandising agency Ceremony of Roses (CoR). It was merged with Sony's existing merchandising division, which subsequently operated as CoR.

In January 2023, Sony Music and Alamo Records founder Todd Moscowitz launched Santa Anna, an artist and label services company.

On June 22, 2026, Clive Davis, who was chief creative officer of Sony Music at the time, died at 94 years old.

== Sony Music Canada ==
Sony Music Entertainment Canada Inc.
- Founded: 1954; 72 years ago
- Country of origin: Canada
- Location: 99 Atlantic Avenue, Suite 800, Toronto, Ontario, Canada
- Official website: sonymusic.ca

Sony Music Canada was formed when Sony Music acquired the Canadian assets of CBS Records in 1990 (itself formerly Columbia Records Canada since 1954).

Sony Music Canada is operated by Sony Canada, which evolved from General Distributors or Gendis, which had been founded in Winnipeg in 1954 by Albert D. Cohen, who had made a deal with Sony to market its transistor radios in the same year.

== Sony Music UK ==
Sony Music Entertainment UK Limited
- Founded: January 4, 1980; 46 years ago
- Country of origin: United Kingdom
- Location: 2 Canal Reach, London, UK
- Official website: sonymusic.co.uk

Sony Music UK was founded in January 1980, and is owned and operated by Sony Music Entertainment in the United Kingdom. Since 2014, Jason Iley has been chairman and CEO of Sony Music UK. Though owned by Sony Music Entertainment, Sony Music UK has standalone operations in the UK to promote musicians within the UK.

In June 2017, it was announced that Sony would be merging its two independent distribution companies The Orchard and Red Essential.

In 2014, Sony had its best singles success of 33 years, with 11 number-one singles. Sony Music artists won a total of five individual awards at the 2015 Brit Awards, including Best Female Solo Artist for Paloma Faith, and Mark Ronson's "Uptown Funk", which picked up Best British Single. Several other of the label's artists – Foo Fighters, One Direction, and Pharrell Williams – also collected awards.

Sony's performance at the BRITs 2015 was the label's best in nearly 20 years, winning a total of five awards. In 2017, Sony Music UK celebrated the most successful BRIT Awards in the company's history, winning seven of the 11 awards.

Sony Music UK has made key acquisitions, including forming Insanity Records with Insanity Management. Craig David became the first artist to sign an album deal with Insanity Records. Sony Music UK signed Robbie Williams, who released his 11th album The Heavy Entertainment Show in 2016. Jason Iley commented that the agreement was "a once in a lifetime signing with the biggest male solo artist of our generation".

Sony Music UK incorporated the independent sales and distribution company Essential Music and Marketing – renamed to Red Essential. In August 2016, Sony Music acquired Ministry of Sound Recordings, home to London Grammar, DJ Fresh, and Sigala.

On April 5, 2017, two of Sony Music UK's labels won awards at the annual Music Week Awards. Columbia Records was awarded A&R of the Year, and Syco was awarded Record Company of the Year.

In 2021, Sony agreed to buy Kobalt neighboring rights division and independent distribution company AWAL from the Kobalt Music Group for $430 million.

In 2024, the former members of Pink Floyd sold their entire catalog for $400 million to Sony. Previously, the band had licensed their music to Sony (from 1975 to 1999 and then again from 2016 until the sale) outside Europe, where the distribution was handled by EMI and later Warner Music Group. Sony also acquired Queen's catalog and "name and likeness" rights for £1 billion. Distribution of the entirety of Queen's music shifted to Sony internationally (outside of North America, where it remains with Disney's Hollywood Records) in July 2026, when their deal with Universal Music Group ended.

== Sony Music Russia ==
Sony Music Entertainment, LLC
- Trade name: Sony Music Russia
- Native name: Сони Мьюзик Энтертейнмент
- Romanized name: Soni Myuzik Enterteynment
- Industry: Music recording
- Founded: 1999; 27 years ago
- Defunct: March 10, 2022; 4 years ago
- Fate: Dissolved
- Headquarters: Moscow
- Area served: Russia
- Key people: Arina Dmitrieva (CEO)
- Revenue: US$42.7 million (FY 2021)
- Operating income: US$2.22 million (FY 2021)
- Owner: Sony
- Number of employees: 40-50 (2022)
- Parent: SBME Holdings B.V.
- Website: Official website (archived)

Sony Music Entertainment Russia was the Russian division of Sony Music Entertainment. The company opened its division in the Russian Federation in 1999. In 2000, the first contract was signed with the Russian group Bi-2. For 2021, experts estimated the company's share in the Russian recording market at approximately 15-20%. Sony Music Entertainment LLC's revenue in 2021 amounted to 2.56 billion rubles ($42.7 million). Net profit amounted to 132.9 million rubles ($2.22 million).

On March 10, 2022, in connection with Russian invasion of Ukraine, Sony Music Entertainment announced the suspension of operations and new releases in Russia, while Russian employees of Sony Music Group would receive pay indefinitely. On September 8, Sony Music officially announced its final withdrawal from Russia. The company recalled all foreign catalogs from the Russian streaming services Yandex Music, Zvooq, and VK Music, and tracks from AC/DC, Beyoncé, Britney Spears, Bring Me the Horizon and many other artists were removed. The Russian division is intended as a completely independent structure from Sony Music to represent only local musicians under the new brand Kiss Koala, which was later bought by the structures of former top managers of Warner Music Russia.

== Criticism and controversies ==
=== CD price fixing ===
Between 1995 and 2000, music companies were found to have used illegal marketing agreements such as minimum advertised pricing to artificially inflate prices of compact discs. This was done in order to end price wars of the early 1990s among discounters such as Best Buy and Target. In 2002, a settlement was reached that included music publishers and distributors Sony Music, Warner Music, Bertelsmann Music Group, EMI and Universal Music. In restitution for price fixing, they agreed to pay a $67.4 million fine and distribute $75.7 million in CDs to public and non-profit groups, but admitted no wrongdoing. It is estimated that customers were overcharged by nearly $500 million overall and up to $5 per album.

=== George Michael ===
British artist George Michael, signed to Columbia in the U.S. and Epic worldwide, advised Sony executives in 1990 that he would not be appearing in music videos to support his forthcoming album, Listen Without Prejudice Vol. 1. Michael then accused Sony of not promoting the album at all. He sued in the UK in 1992, asking to be released from his contract. Sony ultimately prevailed in the courts in 1994, but Michael's contract was bought out by other labels. Some 11 years later, Michael licensed tracks to Sony for release.

=== Michael Jackson and Tommy Mottola ===
The release of Michael Jackson's 2001 album Invincible was preceded by a dispute with Sony Music Entertainment. Jackson had expected the licenses to the masters of his albums to revert to him sometime in the early 2000s, after which he would be able to promote the material however he pleased and keep the profits; however, clauses in the contract set the revert date years into the future. Jackson discovered that the attorney who had represented him in the deal had also been representing Sony. He was also concerned that Sony had been pressuring him to sell his share in its music catalog venture for years; he feared that Sony might have had a conflict of interest, since he would have had to sell his share of the catalog at a low price if his career failed. Jackson sought an early exit from his contract.

In July 2002, Jackson alleged that then-Sony Music chairman Tommy Mottola was a "devil" and "racist" who did not support his African-American artists, using them merely for his own gain. He charged that Mottola had called his colleague Irv Gotti a "fat nigger". Sony refused to renew Jackson's contract, and claimed that a $25 million promotional campaign had failed because Jackson refused to tour in the United States.

=== Prosecution of copyright infringement ===
In May 2012, Sony Music filed charges against the website IsoHunt. The plaintiff's claims in the court document filed at the Supreme Court of British Columbia read: "The IsoHunt Websites have been designed and are operated by the defendants with the sole purpose of profiting from rampant copyright infringement which defendants actively encourage, promote, authorize, induce, aid, abet, materially contribute to and commercially profit from." In February 2016, in a lawsuit filed at a California federal court, Sony Music Entertainment and its associated brands (Arista Records and LaFace Records, formerly owned by Bertelsmann Music Group) accused Belgian radio aggregator Radionomy (owned by Universal Music Group's parent Vivendi) of copyright infringement.

=== Kesha v. Dr. Luke and 2016 boycott ===
In February 2016, 100,000 people signed an online petition in less than 24 hours, calling for a boycott of Sony Music and all other Sony-affiliated businesses after rape allegations against music producer Dr. Luke were made by musical artist Kesha. Kesha requested that the New York Supreme Court to free her from her contract with Sony Music, but the court denied the request, prompting a widespread public and media response.

== List of Sony Music Entertainment labels ==
=== Flagship record labels ===
- Columbia Records
- RCA Records
- Epic Records
- Arista Records
- Jive Records

=== Genre-limited record labels ===
Country music

- Sony Music Nashville
  - Columbia Nashville
  - RCA Records Nashville

Dance/electronic music

- Epic Amsterdam
- Stmpd Rcrds (co-distribution with Universal Music Group)
- EEM Records
- Ultra Records
- Ministry of Sound
- Liquid State (joint-venture)

Christian/gospel music

- Provident Label Group
- RCA Inspiration
- Kingdom Life Records
- DeJountae Records

Latin

- Sony Music Latin

Classical/jazz music

- Sony Classical Records
- Sony Masterworks
  - Milan Records
  - Portrait Records
  - RCA Red Seal Records
  - Okeh Records
  - Flying Buddha
  - Masterworks Broadway
  - XXIM Records

Blues music

- Blind Pig Records

Pop music

- Disruptor Records

Rock music

- Another Century Records

Metal music

- Century Media Records
- Music for Nations

Progressive music

- Inside Out Music

=== Others ===
Sony Music UK

- Columbia Records UK
- Relentless Records
- 5K Records
- Black Butter Records (joint-venture)
- Dream Life Records
- Insanity Records (joint-venture)
- Magic Star
- Robots + Humans
- Since '93
- Sony Music Nashville UK
- WEAREBLK (joint-venture)
- District 18 Entertainment (joint-venture)
- Heavy Muscle (joint-venture)

Sony Music Entertainment India Pvt. Ltd.

- Sony Music India
- Sony Music South

Distributed labels

- Equal Vision Records
- Foundation Media
- Megaforce Records
- Metal Blade Records
- Rimas Entertainment
- Robbins Entertainment
- Shrapnel Records
- Third Man Records
- Thirty Tigers
- ABC Music
- Big Brother Recordings
- Heist or Hit Records
- Mello Music Group
- Babygrande Records

Catalog

- Legacy Recordings
- Follow That Dream Records
- Louder Than Life Records

International

- Ariola Records Intl.
- Defstar Records Intl.
- Relentless Records
- Som Livre

Independent music distribution

- The Orchard
  - IODA
- AWAL

=== Previously affiliated labels ===
- 19 Recordings (2001–2010) (previously through BMG and RCA Music Group, now distributed by BMG Rights Management)
- Def Jam Recordings (1985–1994) (previously through Columbia Records, now part of Universal Music Group)
- Loud Records (1992–2002) (previously through Zoo Entertainment, then RCA Records and later Columbia Records, now a new company called SRC Records through Universal Music Group)
- Chaos Recordings Brasil (1993–2000) (previously part of Columbia Records, now dissolved)
- The Work Group (1993–2000) (previously through Epic Records, now dissolved)
- Date Records (1958–1970) (previously through Columbia Records, now dissolved)
- Aware Records (1997–2010) (now part of Universal Music Group through Republic Records)
- PiperWorld Entertainment (2008–2013) (previously through Columbia Records)
- Roc Nation (2009–2013) (previously through Columbia Records; now distributed by Universal Music Group)
- Nick Records (1993–2010) (previously through Sony Music, now dissolved)
- The Echo Label (2013–2017) (owned by BMG Chrysalis; now distributed by Warner Music Group)
- Volcano Entertainment (1996–2019) (previously through Zomba Label Group and later RCA Records, now dissolved)
- RED Music (1979–2017) (now merged into The Orchard)
- Syco Music (2002–2020) (previously through Sony Music UK, now dissolved)

== See also ==
- List of Sony Music artists
- Sony Music Publishing
- Sony BMG
- Sony BMG copy protection rootkit scandal
- Sony Music Entertainment Japan
- Sony Music Australia
- Sony Music UK
- Sony Music India
- Tero Entertainment
- Lists of record labels
- MTV Unplugged - Live in Athens
- The Orchard
