= Metropolitan Life North Building =

Office skyscraper in Manhattan, New York

- Alternative names: 11 Madison Avenue; New Sony Building; 25 Madison Avenue

General information
- Architectural style: Art Deco
- Location: 11–25 Madison Avenue, Manhattan, New York 10010
- Coordinates: 40°44′30″N 73°59′12″W
- Construction started: 1928
- Completed: 1950

Height
- Roof: 451 ft (137 m)

Technical details
- Floor count: 30
- Floor area: 2,200,000 square feet (200,000 m^{2})

Design and construction
- Architects: Harvey Wiley Corbett and D. Everett Waid

The Metropolitan Life North Building, now known as Eleven Madison and colloquially known as The UBS Building or The CS Building, is a 30-story Art Deco skyscraper adjacent to Madison Square Park at 11–25 Madison Avenue in the Flatiron District neighborhood of Manhattan in New York City. The building is bordered by East 24th Street, Madison Avenue, East 25th Street and Park Avenue South, and was formerly connected by a sky bridge and tunnel to the Metropolitan Life Insurance Company Tower just south of it.

The North Building was built in three stages on the site of the second Madison Square Presbyterian Church. Construction started in 1929, just before the onset of the Great Depression. Originally planned to be 100 stories, the North Building was never completed as originally planned due to funding problems following the Depression. The current design was constructed in three stages through 1950. As part of the Metropolitan Life Home Office Complex, the North Building was added to the National Register of Historic Places on January 19, 1996.

It serves as the North American headquarters for UBS Investment Bank, which is by far the largest tenant. Additionally, a handful of floors previously occupied by UBS predecessor Credit Suisse now houses the headquarters of Sony Corporation of America and its select subsidiaries, including its entertainment unit as well as Sony Music and Sony Music Publishing.

== History ==
=== Site ===
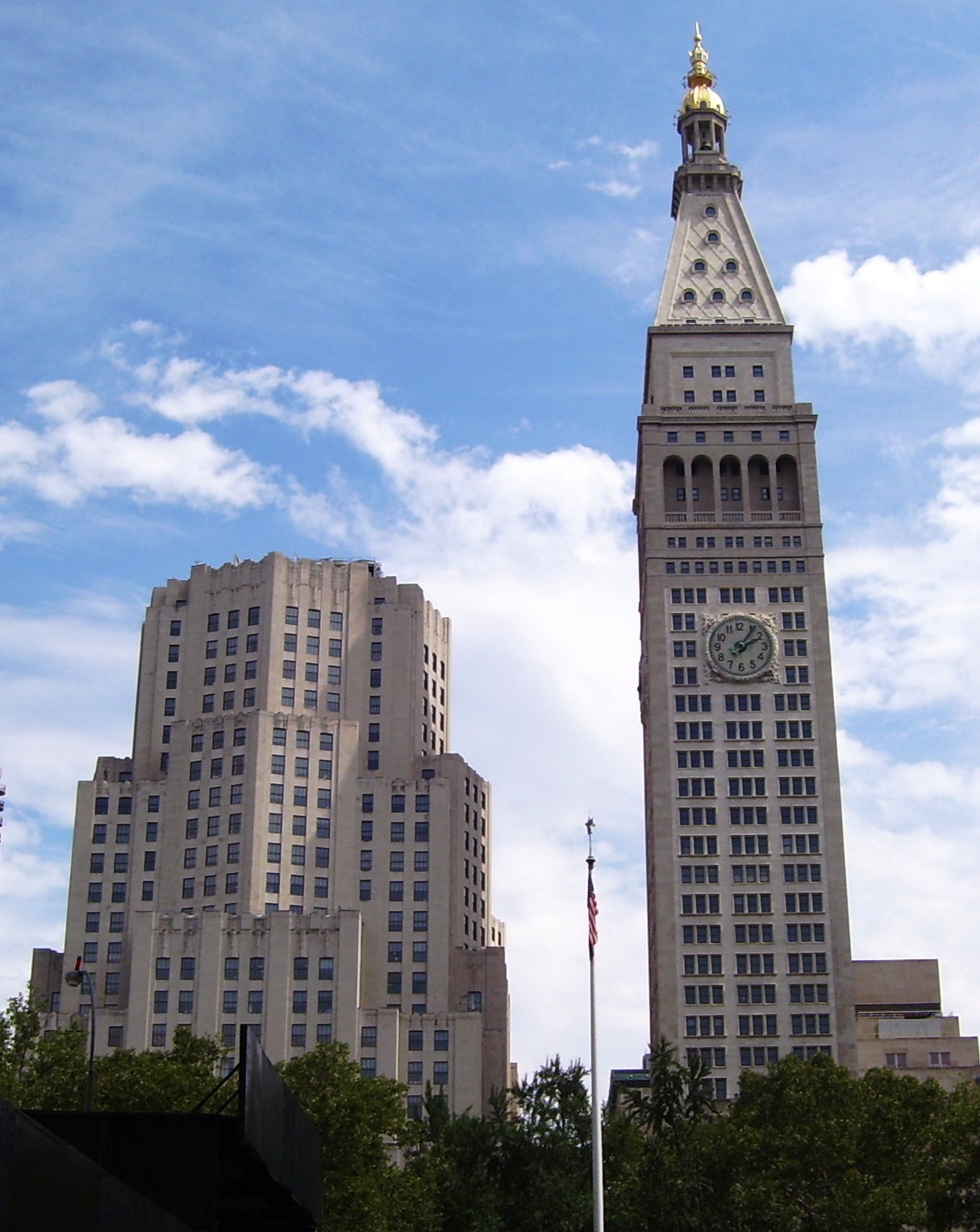
The Metropolitan Life North Building (left) and the Metropolitan Life Insurance Company Tower (right)

The original Madison Square Presbyterian Church, designed by Richard M. Upjohn in the Gothic Revival architectural style, was located on Madison Square Park at the southeast corner of East 24th Street and Madison Avenue, and was completed in 1854. The building was acquired by the Metropolitan Life Insurance Company and razed to make way for the 50-story Metropolitan Life Insurance Company Tower, which was briefly the world's tallest building. In exchange, the church received a 75-by-150-foot (23 by 46 m) plot of land on the north side of 24th Street that became the site for Stanford White's 1906 building for the Madison Square Presbyterian Church, sometimes called the "Parkhurst Church" after Reverend Charles Henry Parkhurst.

A plot on the north side of 24th Street, measuring 75 by 100 feet (23 by 30 m), was developed in 1903 as the first Metropolitan Annex, a 16-story printing plant building faced in Tuckahoe marble. The annex was designed by LeBrun, and it was connected to the main building by a tunnel. White's building was demolished in 1919 to make way for an expansion of that annex. The structure was to be 18 stories tall with six elevators, and would incorporate the existing annex, which would be 75 by 225 feet (23 by 69 m). The ground story of the new annex would contain an auditorium with 1,100-seats, and the 12th story would include a lunchroom and a sky bridge to the 11th story of the home office building across 24th Street. This annex was designed by D. Everett Waid and completed in 1921.

=== Construction ===
The North Building was designed in the 1920s by Harvey Wiley Corbett and D. Everett Waid and built in three stages. Metropolitan Life had acquired the lot bounded by Madison Avenue, 24th Street, Fourth Avenue (now Park Avenue South), and 25th Street in September 1929. Preliminary plans, submitted that October, proposed a 35-story building that would serve as a new "home office", supplanting the old "home office" in the Metropolitan Life Tower directly to the south. The final design for the new building, presented in November 1929, called for a 100-story tower with several setbacks, which would have been the tallest building in the world. The structure would accommodate 30,000 daily visitors when completed, and would have escalators connecting the lowest 13 stories.

Following the Stock Market Crash of 1929 and the onset of the Great Depression, Corbett and Waid resubmitted plans for the building in November 1930. The new plans called for a 28-story brick, granite, and limestone structure. Starrett Brothers & Eken were selected as contractors the following month. Initially, only the eastern half of the block was developed; that structure was finished in 1932. Upon the first stage's completion, Corbett said, "it is a highly specialized building designed primarily as a machine to do as efficiently as possible the particular headquarters' work of our largest insurance company". The new structure contained 22 acres (8.9 ha) of new office space. The original 16-story Metropolitan Life annex, at the northeast corner of Madison Avenue and 24th Street, remained in place.

In 1937, four buildings on Madison Avenue between 24th and 25th Street, ranging in height from 12 to 20 stories, were demolished to make way for the second phase of construction: the northwestern portion of the 28-story structure. In 1938, the company filed plans to build the western half of the 26-story building at a cost of $10 million. The western wall of the existing structure would be demolished so the two sections would be integrated into a single building. The second phase was finished in 1940 and contained 32 stories: 26 above-ground and four basement levels, the same as in the first phase.

LeBrun's and Waid's northern annexes were demolished in 1946 to make way for the third and final stage of the North Building. Waid and Corbett prepared the third phase along with Arthur O. Angilly. The design was similar to that of the first and second phases, but in smaller scale. Construction was completed in 1950. There were no plans to build the extra stories, even though the building plan would have allowed for such an expansion, because Metropolitan Life no longer required the extra space.

A digital rendering of what the building would have looked like if it had actually been built as originally conceived

=== Later years ===
In 1985, Metropolitan Life vacated the clock tower and moved all remaining operations to the north building and the east wing of the south building. From 1994 to 1997, the building's interior was demolished and rebuilt by Haines Lundberg Waehler and the exterior was renovated at a cost of $300 million. The renovation entailed reducing the size of the building's core to provide additional office space. The North Building had been considered obsolete for the uses of Metropolitan Life (now MetLife), which had moved most of its employees to the MetLife Building in Midtown Manhattan. Credit Suisse First Boston, a subsidiary of Credit Suisse, then leased 1.5 million square feet (140,000 m^{2}) within the building, an agreement that was later expanded to 1.6 million square feet (150,000 m^{2}). Other space was taken up by Alexander & Alexander Services, Emanuel/Emanuel Ungaro, Wells Rich Greene and the Gould Paper Corporation.

=== Digital rendering ===
In January 2022, ArchDaily published a digital rendering of what the building would have looked like if it had been constructed as planned to 100 stories and not truncated at 25 stories. 90Grados Arquitectura-Renderings assembled all the available data and graphic information about the building's intended design. The original plans were not extant, but sketches and photographs of a model were available. Where there were gaps in the information, they extrapolated from other designs by Corbett, in particular his work on Rockefeller Center. They then used various rendering programs to create the finished images of the building.

== Architecture ==
The building, which has 2.2 million square feet (200,000 m^{2}) of interior space, was constructed in three stages. The building's bulk is mitigated by numerous setbacks and its polygonal shape. As a result of these setbacks, mandated under the 1916 Zoning Resolution, the architects maximized the usable interior space The building initially contained 30 elevators, enough to serve the originally-planned 100 floors. In addition, because the existing building was constructed to be strong enough to support extra floors, the roof included 16 electrical generators, enough to power the building for several days.

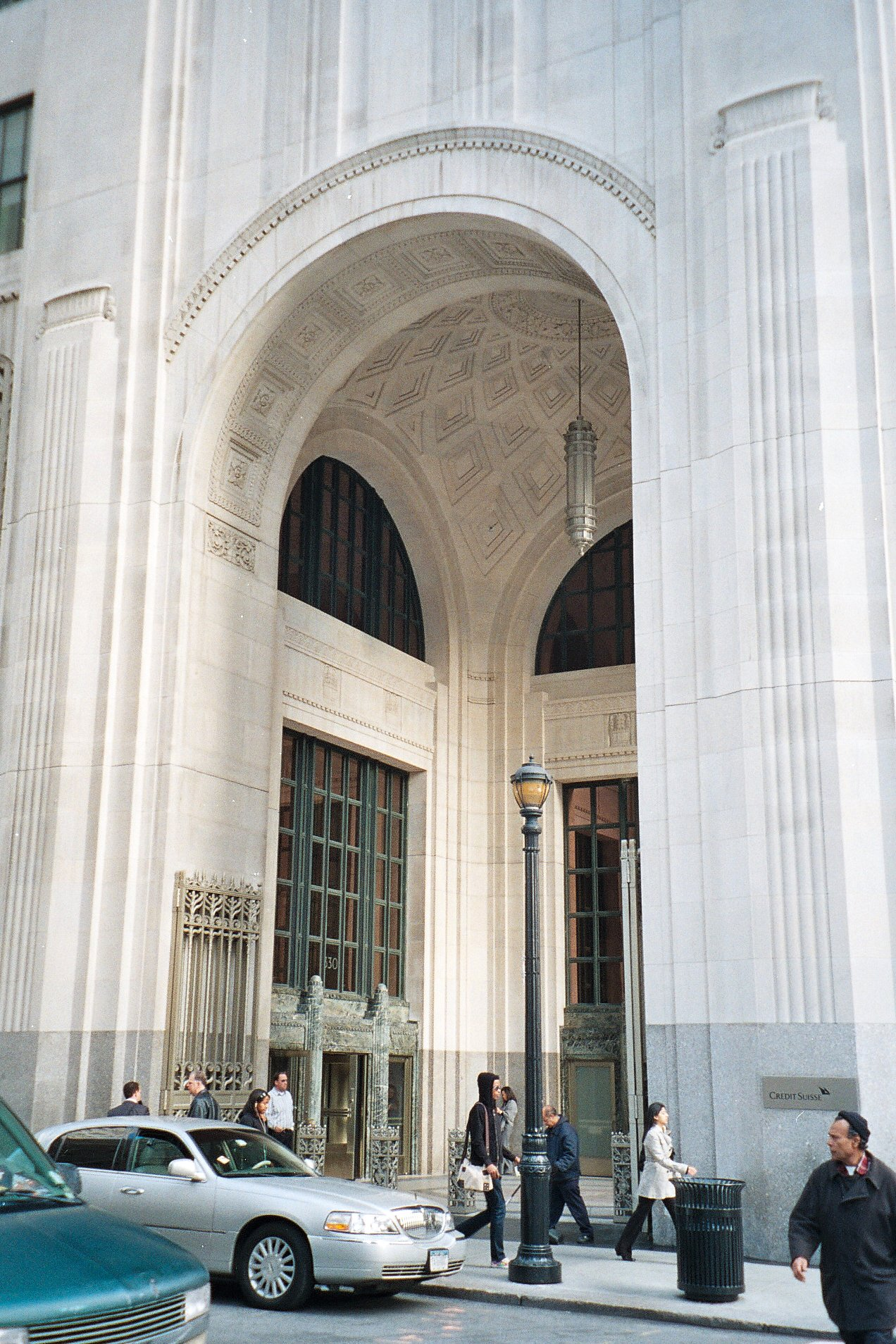
One of the entrance loggias at the corners of the building

=== Facade ===
The North Building is clad entirely with stone and contains numerous angled sides. The building is finished on the outside with Alabama limestone and marble detailing, covering an interior steel frame. The window frames are mostly made of bronze, except those installed during the final stage of construction, which are made of aluminum. The ground-floor windows are multi-pane windows and all others are three-over-three sash windows. Limestone grilles are located outside the second-story windows. The stonework is laid in a scalloped pattern; this is the only major decorative element on the building's exterior.

The North Building features four vaulted corner entrances, which are each three stories high and composed of loggias on either side of the corner. Each entrance contains a three-story-high pier with ribs, which supports a double-height loggia. The vaulted entrances contain modern-style coffers with a Moderne-style chandelier hanging from the center. Pink Tennessee marble is used as a decorative element on the floors and around the doors of each loggia. The middle of the 24th Street facade contains another entrance. The 25th Street side contains numerous loading docks. In addition, there are paired arched openings on Madison Avenue, which are decorated with floral-patterned stone screens. Until 2020, the North and South buildings were connected by a sky bridge on the eighth floor.

=== Interior ===
The three-story lobby contains travertine and marble finishes. The lobby contains a coffered ceiling with aluminum leaf in numerous colors. On the walls above the passages to each elevator lobby. There are bas-reliefs made of aluminum leaf. The other corridors contain terrazzo floors, plaster ceilings with stepped moldings, and marble paneling. On the upper floors, the elevators, restrooms, and stairs are located in a core at the center of each floor.

Corbett and Waid described how the building had "the latest ideas in ventilation, air conditioning, sound deadening, artificial lighting, intercommunicating pneumatic tubes, telephones, call bells, unit operating clock systems [and] special elevator and escalator installations". The offices are located on the outer edges of each floor, near the windows, and are generally open plan spaces with few private rooms in order to accommodate the large numbers of workers at the company. The offices were utilitarian, with indirect artificial lighting allowing for office space that was up to 80 feet (24 m) deep. The stepped acoustic-tile ceilings increased in 6-inch (150 mm) intervals, from their lowest height near the building's core to their highest height near the windows, which maximized natural light while also providing space for ceiling ducts. Another innovation for the building at the time of its construction was the inclusion of a building-wide air conditioning system. The 27th floor contained an auditorium. There are 8 elevator banks

There are four basements: the kitchen on the first basement level (just below ground), the employee dining areas on the second and third basement levels, and the mechanical spaces on the fourth basement level. The dining areas could accommodate 8,000 diners per day. Seven-foot-high (2.1 m) murals are mounted on the walls of the basements' dining rooms and elevator lobbies. These murals were painted by Edward Trumbull, D. Putnam Brinley, Nicholas L. Pavloff, N. C. Wyeth, and Griffith Bailey Coale, depicting scenes from American folk stories, North American wildlife, and New York state history. They were intended to "bring to the employees a feeling of cessation from their work through the contemplation of artistic and amusing masterpieces." The original plans were to include an entrance to the 23rd Street subway station, but the entrance was ultimately built one block south, on 23rd Street, with an entrance through the Metropolitan Life Insurance Company Tower.

== Tenants ==
SL Green Realty has owned 11 Madison Avenue since 2015. The primary tenant was Credit Suisse. In recent developments, UBS has initiated plans to relocate its investment banking staff from 1285 Sixth Avenue to 11 Madison Avenue, the former headquarters of Credit Suisse. The move is part of the ongoing integration process following UBS’s acquisition of Credit Suisse, aimed at consolidating operations and optimizing office space. The relocation underscores UBS’s commitment to streamlining its corporate structure and fostering collaboration by housing its workforce under fewer roofs in strategically located buildings. Additionally, Yelp, Inc. and several Sony companies such as Sony Corporation of America, Sony Music Entertainment, and Sony Music Publishing occupy the building. The restaurant Eleven Madison Park is at street level on the Madison Avenue side of the building. The restaurant, which opened in 1998, offers a vegan multi-course tasting menu.

The building previously served as Met Life's records warehouse.

== In popular culture ==
- The 1981 thriller Eyewitness used the building's lobby as the place where William Hurt's character was employed as a janitor, and where the brutal murder that begins the film takes place. Other scenes from the film were shot there as well.
- Director Martin Scorsese used the building as the location for Griffin Dunne's office in the 1985 film After Hours.
- Woody Allen's 1986 Radio Days used the North Building for the building where the offices of a broadcasting network were located.
