= Metropolitan Life Insurance Company Tower =

Skyscraper in Manhattan, New York

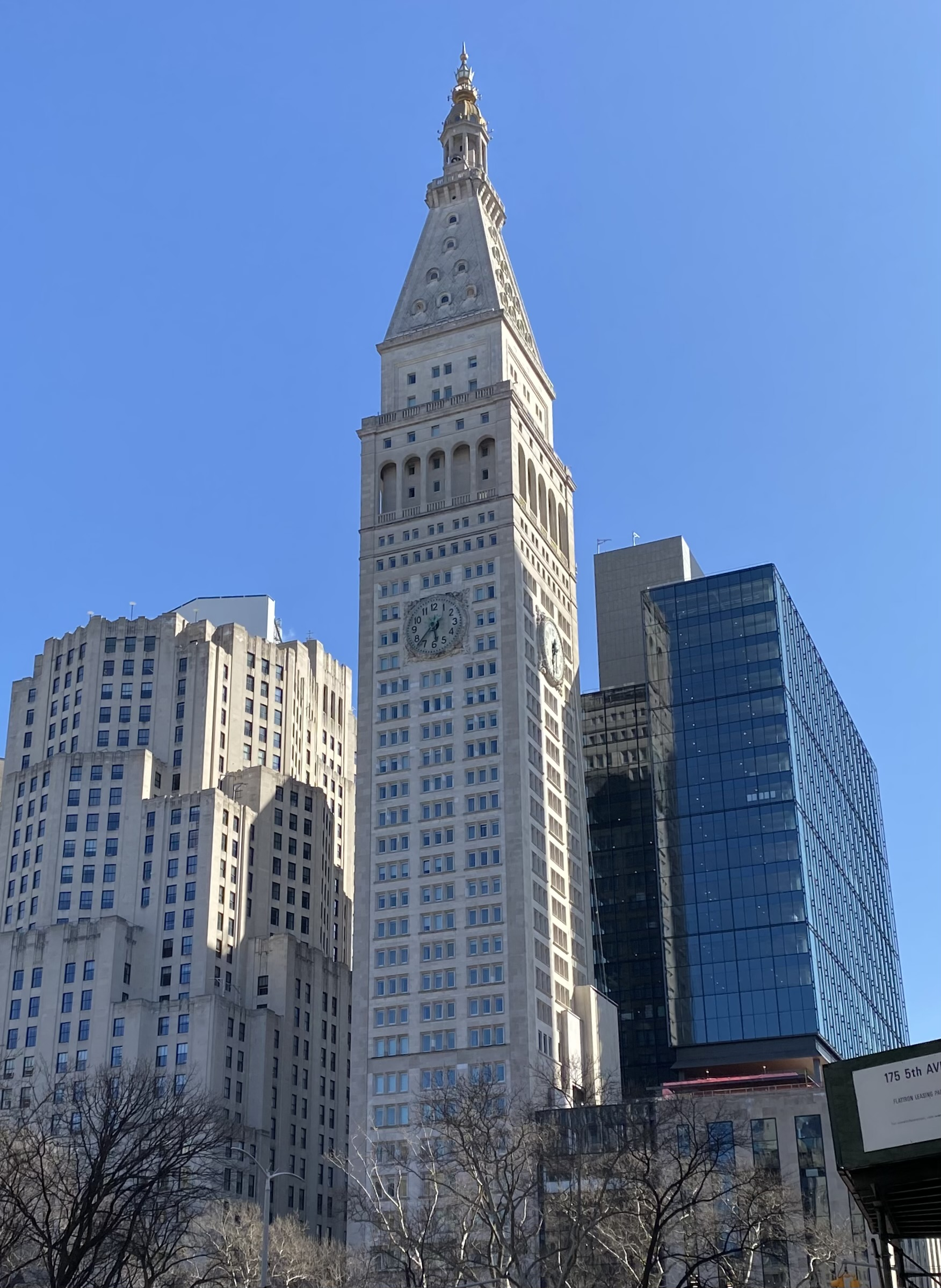
- Seen in 2024
- Alternative names: Met Life Tower; Metropolitan Life Tower

Record height
- Tallest in the world from 1909 to 1913^{[I]}
- Preceded by: Singer Building
- Surpassed by: Woolworth Building

General information
- Type: Hotel; Commercial offices
- Architectural style: Gothic Revival architecture
- Location: 1 Madison Avenue; Manhattan, New York, U.S.
- Construction started: 1890 (original east wing); 1905 (tower); 1955 (current east wing)
- Completed: 1893–1905 (original east wing); 1909 (tower); 1957–1960 (current east wing)
- Renovated: 1953–1957; 2015 (tower conversion to hotel); 2020–2024 (east wing)
- Demolished: 1953–1955 (original east wing)
- Owner: Abu Dhabi Investment Authority

Height
- Roof: 700 ft (210 m)

Technical details
- Floor count: 49

Design and construction
- Architects: Napoleon LeBrun & Sons (original east wing and tower); Morgan & Meroni (current east wing)
- Metropolitan Life Insurance Company Tower
- U.S. National Register of Historic Places
- U.S. National Historic Landmark
- U.S. Historic district – Contributing property
- New York State Register of Historic Places
- New York City Landmark
- Coordinates: 40°44′28″N 73°59′15″W
- Architectural style: Italian Renaissance Revival
- Part of: Metropolitan Life Home Office Complex (ID95001544)
- NRHP reference No.: 78001874
- NYSRHP No.: 06101.007655
- NYCL No.: 1530

Significant dates
- Added to NRHP: January 29, 1972
- Designated NHL: June 2, 1978
- Designated CP: January 19, 1996
- Designated NYSRHP: June 23, 1980
- Designated NYCL: June 13, 1989

The Metropolitan Life Insurance Company Tower (colloquially known as the Met Life Tower and also as the South Building) is a skyscraper occupying a full block in the Flatiron District of Manhattan in New York City, New York, United States. The building is composed of two sections: a 700-foot-tall (210 m) tower at the northwest corner of the block, at Madison Avenue and 24th Street, and a shorter east wing occupying the remainder of the block bounded by Madison Avenue, Park Avenue South, 23rd Street, and 24th Street. The South Building, along with the North Building directly across 24th Street, comprises the Metropolitan Home Office Complex, which originally served as the headquarters of the Metropolitan Life Insurance Company (now publicly known as MetLife).

The South Building's tower was designed by the architectural firm of Napoleon LeBrun & Sons and erected between 1905 and 1909. Inspired by St Mark's Campanile, the tower features four clock faces, four bells, and lighted beacons at its top, and was the tallest building in the world until 1913. The tower originally included Metropolitan Life's offices, and since 2015, it has contained a 273-room luxury hotel known as the New York EDITION Hotel. The tower was listed on the National Register of Historic Places in 1972, made a National Historic Landmark in 1978, and designated as a city landmark by the New York City Landmarks Preservation Commission in 1989.

The east wing was designed by Lloyd Morgan and Eugene Meroni and constructed in two stages between 1953 and 1960. The east wing is also referred to as One Madison Avenue. It replaced another building on the site, which was built in phases from 1893 to 1905, and which was also designed by LeBrun's firm. When the current east wing was built, the 700-foot tower was extensively renovated as well. In 2020, work started on an addition to the east wing, which was designed by Kohn Pedersen Fox and completed in 2024.

== Site ==
The Metropolitan Life Insurance Company Tower, or the South Building, is located in the Flatiron District of Manhattan in New York City, New York, United States. It occupies an entire block between Madison Avenue and Madison Square Park to the west, 24th Street to the north, Park Avenue South to the east, and 23rd Street to the south. The block measures 200 feet (61 m) from north to south and 445 feet (136 m) from east to west. The Metropolitan Life North Building is across 24th Street to the north, and the One Madison residential tower is across 23rd Street to the south.

== Architecture ==
The building is composed of the east wing and the tower. The first section of the original 11-story, full-block east wing was completed in 1893 and was designed by Napoleon LeBrun & Sons. The tower was a later addition to the original building, constructed between 1905 and 1909. The original home office building was replaced with the current building, designed by Lloyd Morgan and Eugene Meroni, between 1953 and 1957. The complex is one of the few remaining major insurance companies' "home offices" in New York City. (Note: The others include: Former New York Life Insurance Company Building at 346 Broadway; Home Life Insurance Company Building at 256 Broadway; New York Life Building at 50 Madison Avenue, three blocks north; Germania Life Building at 50 Union Square East; Equitable Building at 120 Broadway)

=== Tower ===
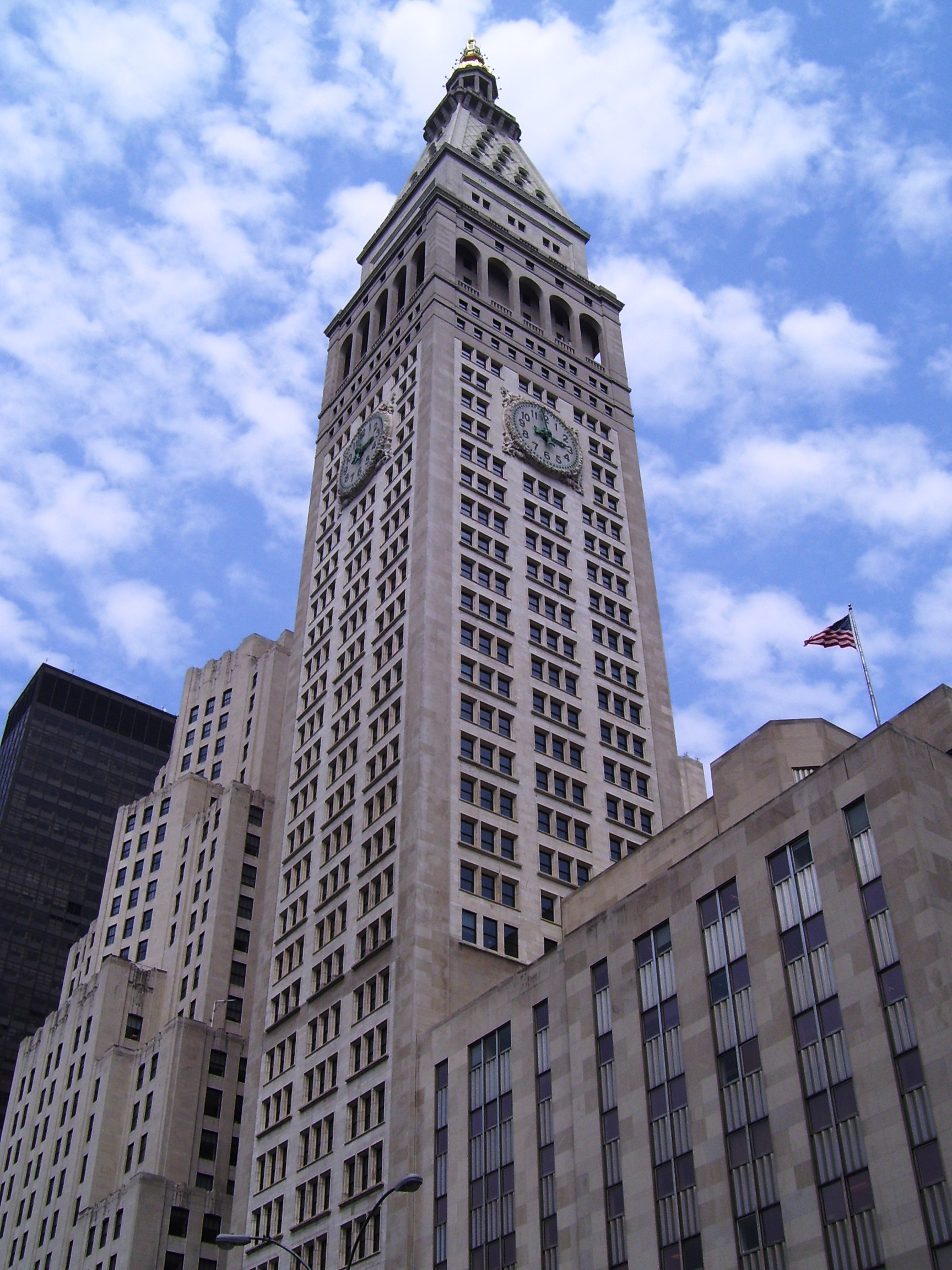
The tower (center) seen from below with clock faces; the east wing is to the right, and the New York Merchandise Mart (far left) and Metropolitan Life North Building (near left) can also be seen

The building's tower is located at the northwest corner of the block, at Madison Avenue and 24th Street, with the address 5 Madison Avenue. The tower rises 700 feet (210 m) to its pinnacle. It has a footprint measuring 75 feet (23 m) north-south along Madison Avenue and 85 feet (26 m) west-east on 24th Street. This gives the tower a height-to-width ratio of 8.25:1. The Metropolitan Life Tower is modeled after St Mark's Campanile in Venice, Italy. The tower is older than its model, since St Mark's Campanile had collapsed in 1902 and was replaced in 1912; it is also more than twice as large as St Mark's Campanile.

Like the facades of many early skyscrapers, the tower's exterior was divided into three horizontal sections similar to the components of a column—namely a base, shaft, and capital—in both its original and renovated forms. These three sections include usable space inside and are collectively 660 feet (200 m) tall. The tower is topped by a 40-foot-tall (12 m) pyramidal roof, which is slightly set back and contains a cupola and lantern. The tower was originally sheathed in Tuckahoe marble, provided by the main contractor, the Hedden Construction Company. During the 1964 renovation, plain limestone was used to cover the tower and the east wing, replacing LeBrun's old Renaissance Revival details with a streamlined, modern look making it somewhat closer in appearance to the east wing at 1 Madison Avenue which is in the Streamline Moderne style and the Metropolitan LIfe North building at 11 Madison Avenue which is in Art Deco style. The tower was designed with oversized exterior details to make it seem smaller than it actually was. Some 7,500 short tons (6,700 long tons; 6,800 t) of steel were used in the tower's structural frame. The footings of the tower are 60 feet (18 m) deep, supported by twelve columns on the edges and eight columns inside the plot, and anchored to a layer of bedrock between 28 and 46 feet (8.5 and 14.0 m) deep. The main columns at the tower's corners measure 2 by 2 feet (0.61 by 0.61 m). They bear structural loads of up to 10.4 million pounds (4,700,000 kg) when wind pressure was taken into account. The structural steel frame of the tower, and of its former east wing, is encased in reinforced concrete. The marble and brickwork used in the building is anchored to the structural steel frame, while the floors are made of inverted concrete arches. As a consequence of all the marble used in the Met Life Tower, it weighed about 38,000 short tons (34,000 long tons; 34,000 t) when first built, or about twice as much as the Singer Tower.

==== Facade ====
The base comprises the first and second stories. The lowest portion of the facade along Madison Avenue and 24th Street contains a 5-foot-tall (1.5 m) water table made of granite, which wraps around to the east wing. At the first floor, there are two rectangular show windows and a small doorway on Madison Avenue, and two show windows flanking a larger entrance on 24th Street. On the second floor, the Madison Avenue and 24th Street sides each contain three short tripartite windows.

When the tower was built, the base comprised the first through fifth stories. A large cornice was located above the fourth story, and smaller cornices above the second and fifth stories. The original ornamentation on the rest of the tower was relatively restrained, except around the clock faces. The 1960s renovation replaced the marble between the first and fifth stories, and between the 20th and 36th stories, with limestone.

The "shaft" of the tower spans the third through 28th floors. The southern facade of the tower contains windows only above the 11th story, and the eastern facade contains windows above the 12th story, because the former east wing was located below these floors. On each floor, the "shaft" contains three sets of three windows per side. The exception is at the 25th through 27th floors, where the building's clock faces are located. On these floors, there are two paired windows on the outer edges of the tower. The 29th and 30th floors serve stylistically as "transitional stories", with ten windows per side on each floor; the 29th floor contains a single arrangement of 10 windows, while the 30th-floor windows have been divided into five pairs. This is largely the same arrangement as the original, except that in LeBrun's design, the "shaft" comprised the sixth through 30th floors.

The 31st through 38th floors comprise the tower's "capital". The 31st through 33rd floors are arranged as a loggia with arcades containing five arches on each side. The facade of the tower is recessed behind the arcade, and a balustrade wraps around the edges of the arcade, creating a patio. When built, the arcade was composed of stone columns, but these were replaced with masonry columns in the 1960s renovation. On the 34th floor, there are five windows per side, corresponding to the arches below. The setback tower rises from the 35th through 38th stories as a freestanding plinth. On these floors, the window arrangement indicates that the northern and southern facades are wider than the western and eastern facades, with six windows to the north and south, and four to the west and east.

==== Clock ====
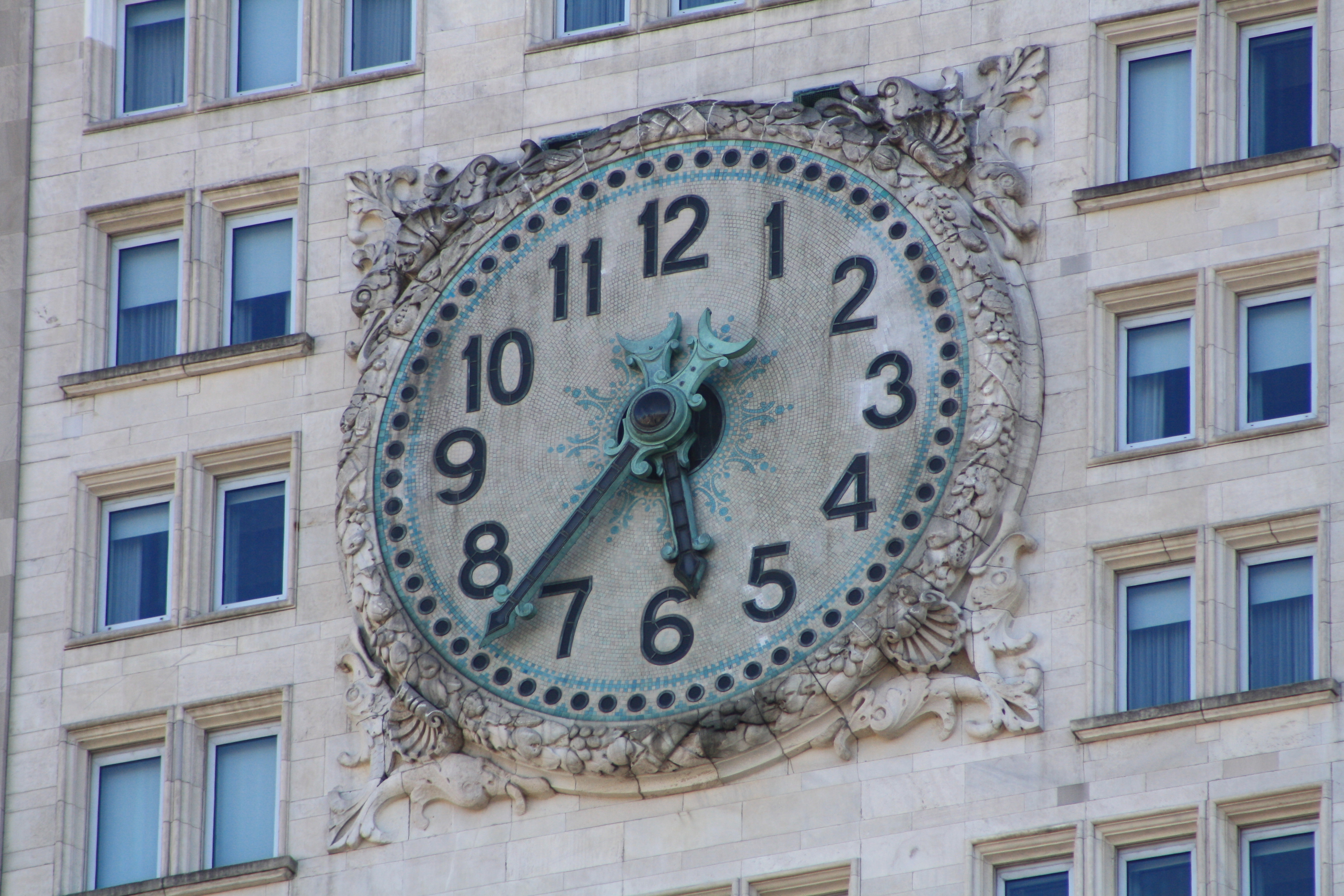
Detailed view of the clock face on the tower's Western side

A clock face is centered on all four sides of the tower from the 25th through 27th floors. Each clock face is 26.5 feet (8.1 m) in diameter, while the numerals on the clock faces are four feet (1.2 m) tall. The numerals and minute markers on the clock faces are edged with copper, while the minute and hour hands are made of iron with a copper sheathing. The minute hands weigh 1,000 pounds (450 kg) and are 17 feet (5.2 m) long, while the hour hands weigh 700 pounds (320 kg) and are 13.33 feet (4.06 m) long. The mechanism was controlled by electricity, a novelty upon the tower's completion. The master clock, which controlled the large clock faces as well as a hundred other clocks in the same complex, was located on the first floor of the former home office, and ran with a maximum error of five seconds per month.

The clock faces were the largest in the world upon their completion. The clock faces are made of reinforced concrete. Blue glazed tiles run along the circumference of each face; in addition, there is a tiled corona at the center of each face. The clock faces contain ornamentation by Pierre LeBrun, of Napoleon LeBrun and Sons. These include dolphins and shells on the spandrels at each face's corner, as well as marble wreaths with fruit-and-flower motifs on the faces themselves.

==== Roof ====
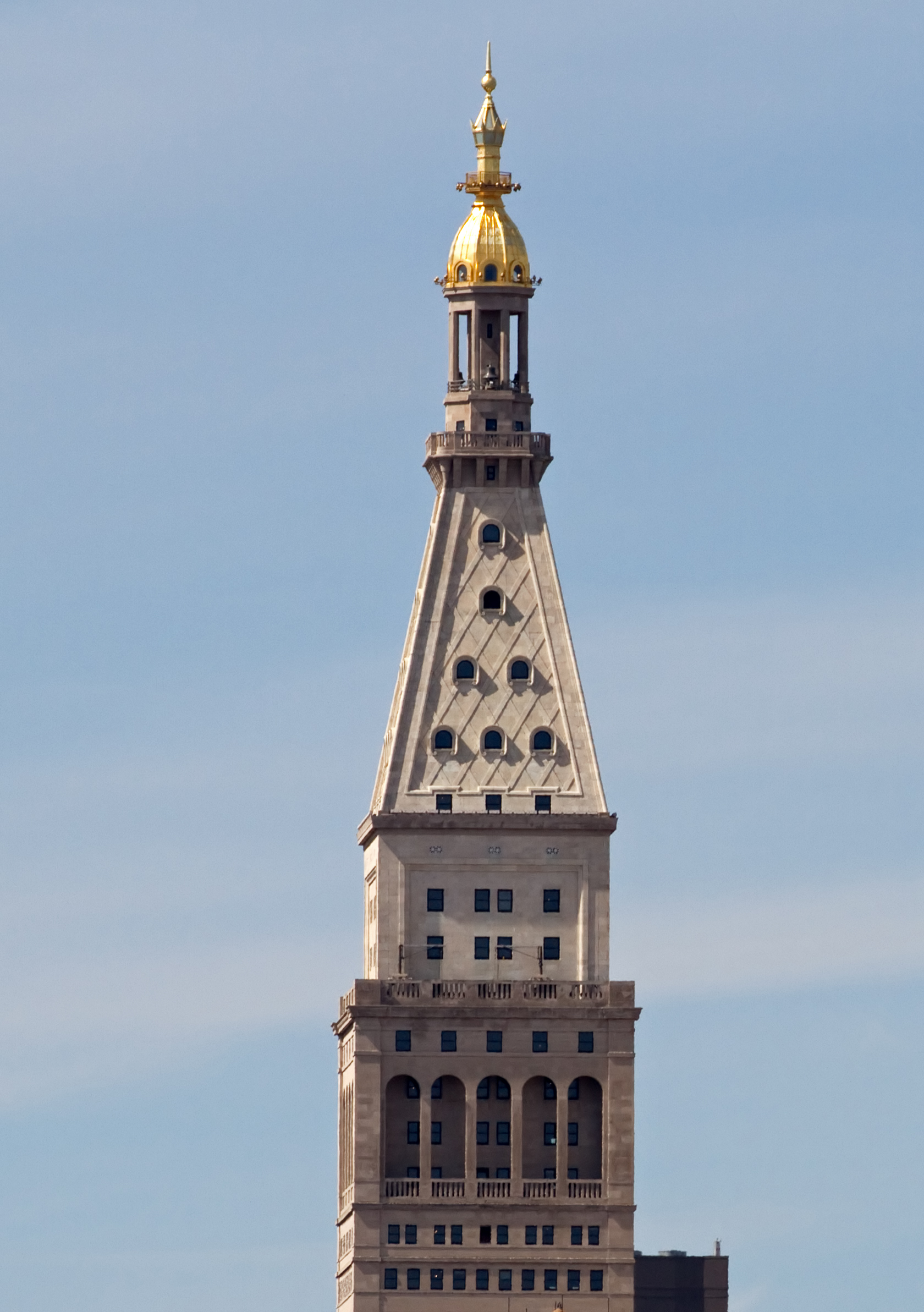
The pyramidal roof of the tower has dormer windows and is topped by a peristyle and cupola.

The pyramidal roof comprises the 39th and higher floors, and is set off by a cornice at the 39th-story level. Dormer windows protrude from the roof on the 39th through 43rd floors; these dormers contain semi-circular hoods, except for the 39th-floor dormers, which do not contain any hoods. The higher floors of the roof have fewer windows on each side. (Note: On the 40th through 44th floors, the north and south facades contain 4, 4, 3, 2, and 1 windows per side, respectively, while the west and east facades contain 3, 3, 2, 1, and 1 windows per side.) The 44th floor is illuminated by two small windows on each side, located between ribs that rise to support a square viewing platform on the 45th floor. The 46th and 47th floors comprise a two-story-tall peristyle, supported by eight columns. The 48th floor contains a gold-colored aluminum cupola with eight windows. The topmost level is the 49th floor, which consists only of a platform with a gold-colored aluminium railing. (Note: Other sources cite the balcony level as being the 46th floor, if only usable stories are counted, or the 50th floor.) The 41st through 45th floors are accessible only by a staircase. The viewing platform was originally publicly usable, receiving 120,000 visitors from around the world between 1909 and 1914.

The tower contains four bells within the peristyle. These include a 7,000-pound (3,200 kg) B♭ bell on the west, a 3,000-pound (1,400 kg) E♭ bell on the east, a 2,000-pound (910 kg) F♮ bell on the north, and a 1,500-pound (680 kg) G♮ bell on the south. The bells were the highest in the world at the time of their construction. These are respectively struck by hammers weighing 94, 71, 61, and 54 pounds (equivalent to 43, 32, 28, and 24 kg respectively). A fifth hammer, weighing 131 pounds (59 kg), strikes the 7,000-pound bell each hour. The smaller hammers strike the bells every 15 minutes. (Note: The four smaller hammers strike the respective bells at the following intervals: four blows at 15 minutes past the hour, eight blows at 30 minutes past the hour, twelve blows at 45 minutes past the hour, and sixteen blows each hour on the hour.) On weekdays between 9 a.m. and 10 p.m., and on weekends between 10 a.m. and 10 p.m., the bells played "I Know That My Redeemer Liveth" every 15 minutes. The bells were not given nicknames: rather, Metropolitan Life referred to each bell by its cardinal direction.

An eight-sided, 8-foot-wide (2.4 m) beacon is located at the top of the cupola. As designed, the white lantern is lit after 10:00 p.m., and momentarily turns off every 15 minutes when red and white lights flash the time. (Note: The red lights flash at the following intervals: once at 15 minutes past the hour, twice at 30 minutes past the hour, three times at 45 minutes past the hour, and four times each hour on the hour. After the red light flashes, a white light flashes the number of hours at the present time, and then the white lantern turns on again. For instance, 10:15 p.m. would be signified by one red flash followed by ten white flashes.) The beacon was one of a few broadly visible features of the New York City nighttime skyline until the mid-20th century.

==== Interior ====
When built, the tower section featured granite floors and metal interior furnishings, though there was very little wood trim, unlike other contemporary structures. The lower floors contained bronze grillwork and doorways, especially around the elevators, while on the upper floors, ornamental iron is used for the metalwork around the elevators. The second-floor spaces contained offices of the Metropolitan Life Insurance Company and contained white marble wainscoting, plaster cornices, marble mantels, etched-glass doors facing the executive offices, and red mahogany door, wall, and window panels. Each of the tower's floors are up to 5,400 square feet (500 m^{2}) in area, smaller than the floor areas of most other nearby office buildings. During the 1960s renovation, the tower was fitted with more modern furnishings such as air conditioning, acoustic ceiling tiles, and automatic elevators, to match the new eastern wing. Marble floors were one of the few holdovers of the previous decor. The staircase leading to the top floors of the tower also retains its original decoration, including cast-iron railings, ceramic-tile wainscoting, marble stair treads, and landings with mosaic-tile floors.

Since 2015, the tower section has been a 273-room luxury hotel called the New York Edition Hotel, with per-night hotel room rates starting at $600. Most of the historic detail in the interior was removed in the individual hotel rooms, but there are some remaining vestiges, such as the original scalloped ceilings. On the second floor is an upscale restaurant called The Clocktower, a Michelin-starred eatery headed by British chef Jason Atherton. The restaurant has a dining area, a separate bar, and a room with a billiards table, and is only accessible through the building's lobby. There is a guestroom at the same level as the clock faces, but the clock machinery is inaccessible to the room's occupants.

=== One Madison Avenue ===
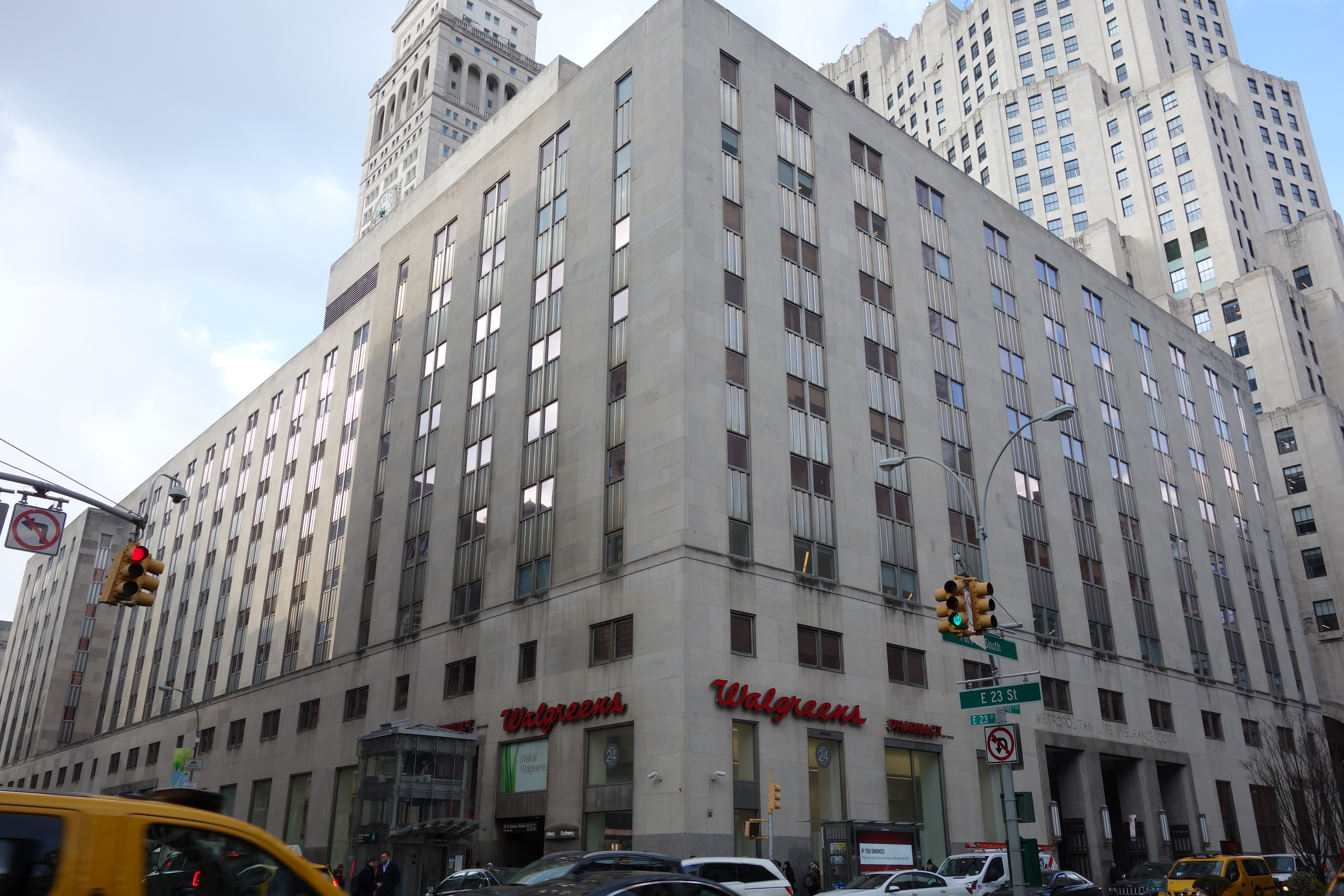
The east wing, also known as One Madison Avenue, prior to its expansion in the 2020s. The clock tower is in the background to the left, while the Metropolitan Life North Building, also designed by D. Everett Waid, is in the background to the right.

The east wing is at One Madison Avenue, and was fourteen stories tall when completed in 1955, measuring 240 feet (73 m) high. Built in the late Art Moderne style to designs by D. Everett Waid, it extends east to Park Avenue South, covering nearly the entire block, and originally had nearly 1.2 million square feet (110,000 m^{2}) of interior space. In the early 2020s, the 10th through 14th stories were demolished (accounting for nearly half the building's height), and an 18-story glass-faced office tower was built over the roof of the ninth floor. The glass tower covers 530,000 square feet (49,000 m^{2}), giving the expanded structure 1.4 million square feet (130,000 m^{2}) of usable office space.

==== Facade ====
The lowest two floors contain a granite facade, while the remaining stories contain a facade of Alabama limestone, as well as stainless-steel spandrels between each window. As designed, there were setbacks behind the 2nd, 10th, and 12th floors. A portion of the office structure's facade along Madison Avenue was replaced in the 2020s with a glass wall, and a metal canopy is placed at the bottom of the glass wall, marking an entrance to One Madison Avenue.

There is a double-height transitional story separating the limestone east wing below from the glass tower above. The glass addition contains roof terraces on the 10th and 11th floors, rising 124 feet (38 m) above the sidewalk. The glass addition is separated from the roof of the 1955 structure by large diagonal steel trusses. in addition to a massive truss above the 1955 structure's roof. The trusses are clad with fiberglass. Each of the annex's glass panes is made of four panels and measures 10 by 18 feet (3.0 by 5.5 m) across. The facade of the glass addition contains dark horizontal mullions at three-story intervals. Vertical mullions are also positioned along the facade, spaced every 15 feet (4.6 m). There are also limestone decorative elements on the glass annex, which were carved from the same quarry as the original tower.

==== Interior ====
One Madison Avenue's internal structure consists of a steel frame. Thirteen mega-columns rise from the base of the 1950s wing to support the weight of the 2020s glass annex; nine of the mega-columns date from the wing's original construction, while four were added in the 2020s renovation. Some of these columns are as wide as 5 square feet (0.46 m^{2}) across. The use of mega-columns permitted the interiors to have more column-free space. In addition, the east wing's mechanical core serves the original 1950s wing, the glass addition, and the original clock tower. Fresh air is circulated throughout One Madison Avenue's interior. The slab-to-slab height between each story is 10 feet (3.0 m).

One Madison Avenue is connected to the Metropolitan Life North Building by a preexisting tunnel. Until 2020, the buildings were also connected by a sky bridge on the eighth floor. At the southeastern corner, on the basement level, there is a direct entrance to the downtown platform of the New York City Subway's 23rd Street–Baruch College station, served by the 6 and <6> trains.

The lobby of One Madison Avenue was combined with that of the clock tower when the east wing was originally constructed. It consists of floors and walls made of white marble and darker-marble accents, as well as a sheet rock ceiling with lighting panels, and stainless-steel doors and trim. Above the lobby are the office floors, which contain sheet rock walls and dropped ceilings; around the elevator lobbies, the floors are made of terrazzo tiles, and the walls contain a travertine veneer. The lowest six floors were served mainly by escalators, and the upper floors were served by elevators. There was also wood paneling on the walls near the executive offices. A replica of the original home office's board room was built on the 11th floor of the east wing, and featured mahogany wainscoting, a coffered ceiling, and leather covering the walls. Following the 2020s renovation, a 7,000-square-foot (650 m^{2}) tenant area called the Commons was built across the lobby and basement spaces, and a 350-seat auditorium was built on the lower floors.

When the glass addition was completed, it contained a 15,000-square-foot (1,400 m^{2}) food market, and a 9,000-square-foot (840 m^{2}) tenants' lounge and fitness center. The annex's anchor tenant, IBM, installed a wave-shaped light fixture in the lobby, as well as a blue bar and a technology center on the second floor. The ground floor contains La Tête d'Or, a 13,500-square-foot (1,250 m^{2}) restaurant designed by Rockwell in the Art Deco style. There is also a rooftop terrace measuring 11,000 square feet (1,000 m^{2}) and various gardens measuring about 1 acre (44,000 ft^{2}; 4,000 m^{2}). The rooftop terrace was designed by David Rockwell. Another terrace, measuring 25,000 square feet (2,300 m^{2}), is reserved for the building's anchor tenant.

=== Original home office ===
The original home office occupied what is now the east wing. The section facing 23rd Street was 11 stories tall and the section on 24th Street was 12 stories tall, with a total height of 165 feet (50 m). Designed by Napoleon LeBrun, it contained Italian Renaissance motifs along the entire facade. The home office was erected in multiple sections, with the 23rd Street side being completed first.

==== Facade ====
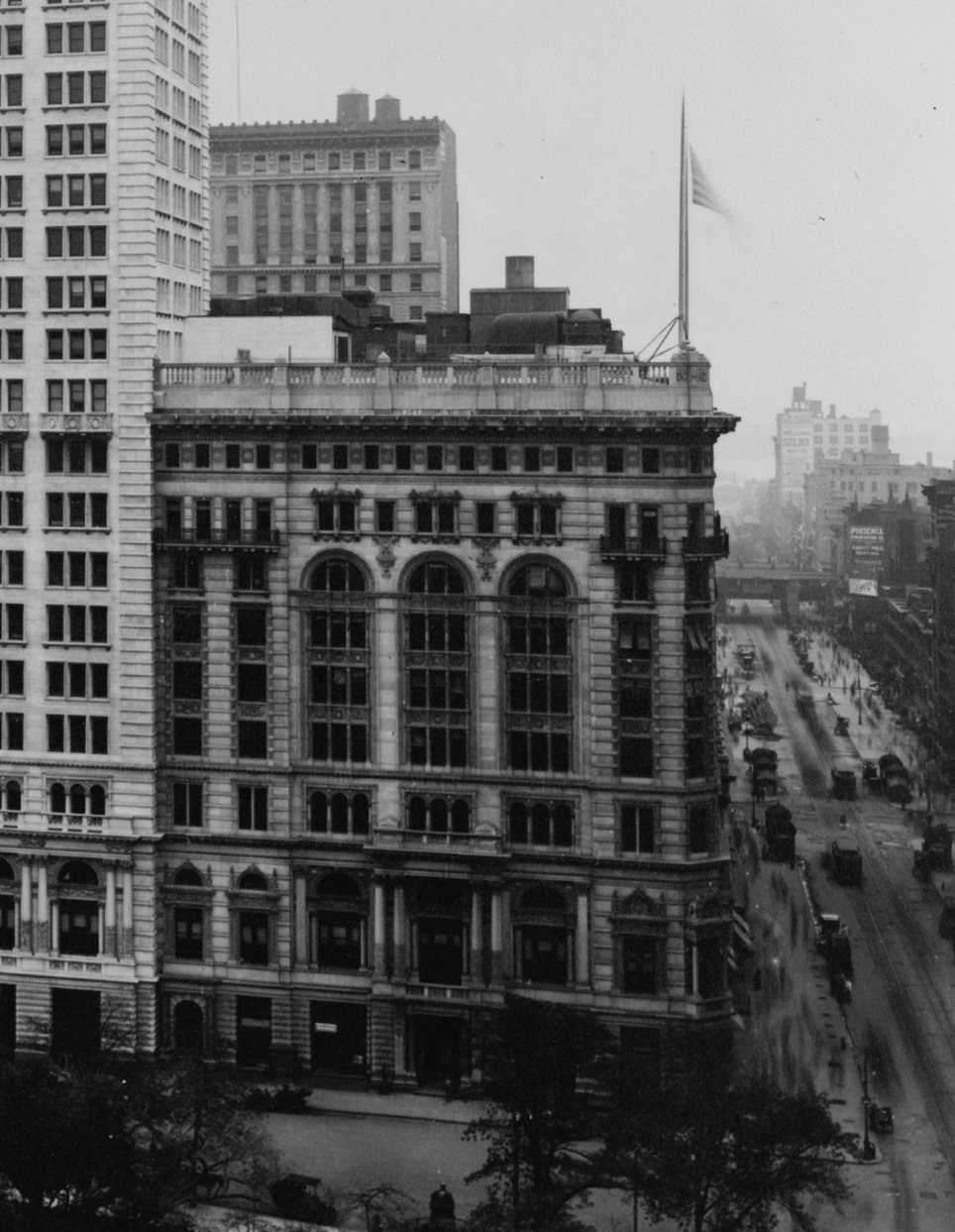
Original home office, seen in 1911

The tower and home office originally had a facade of ashlar on the first story, and an elaborate arcade of columns and pilasters on the second and third stories. The main entrance along Madison Avenue, as well as 150 feet (46 m) of the 23rd Street facade, contained slightly projecting columns, which created porticoes. Similar to the original design of the tower, the original home office had a large cornice above the fourth floor and smaller cornices above the second and fifth floors. On the fourth through ninth floors, the facade was arranged with deeply molded and decorated reveals, as well as carved mullions. These elements were arranged to form an arched arcade, which extended through the ninth floor; the windows were located in slightly recessed bays between each arch.

==== Interior ====
Inside the building, a large marble corridor ran between the entrances at Madison Avenue and Fourth Avenue (now Park Avenue South). (Note: The section of Fourth Avenue adjacent to the Metropolitan Life Tower was renamed Park Avenue South in 1959, after the demolition of the original home office.) Accessible from this hallway was a United States Post Office branch, a Western Union telegraph booth, a bank, telephone booths, and numerous shops. Cross-passages ran north and south to 24th and 23rd Streets, and stairs led to the subway station's downtown platform. The main rotunda was at the Madison Avenue entrance, measuring 40 feet (12 m) square and 70 feet (21 m) high, from which a stairway ascended to the second floor. Within the home office, there were 38 elevators, serving 1,100 tenants. The elevators were grouped in several banks throughout the building, although these were not all connected except at the lobby. The original home office also contained an extensive fire sprinkler system with standpipes and automatic sprinklers.

The home office served as the nexus of Metropolitan Life's operations and largely contained an open plan work space. The exception was the executive offices, which were decorated with mahogany. The interior layout was rearranged approximately every five years, at least in the building's early history, though the interior arrangements were always focused on worker efficiency. The original home office also had several interior courts.

The structure was generally not publicly accessible, and employees' movements were closely monitored. Conversely, there were also many amenities for employees, including a library, auditorium, gymnasium, and medical and dental offices. There was also a recreational space on the roof of the home office's 23rd Street portion, and through the larger complex's extensive system of kitchens and dining rooms, (Note: When the Metropolitan Life North Building opened in 1932, the tunnel under 24th Street provided access to the basements of that building, which contained a kitchen and two dining room levels.) the company offered free lunch to every employee between 1908 and 1994. Though the home office accommodated 14,500 workers by 1938, they were split up into different social hierarchies, with immigrants in service jobs, women in seamstresses' and cleaners' jobs, and native-born workers of both genders in white-collar jobs.

== History ==
Before the home office at Madison Square was completed, the Metropolitan Life Insurance Company (now MetLife) had been headquartered at three buildings in Lower Manhattan, all of which have been demolished. Its first headquarters was at 243 Broadway, which the company occupied between 1868 and 1869. This headquarters comprised two and a half rooms totaling "not more than 900 square feet" (84 m^{2}): one for the president and another for the remaining staff. In 1870, Metropolitan Life moved to 319 Broadway's third floor, a slightly larger space that also contained a supply room. The company moved again in 1876 to Park Place and Church Street, during which its operations grew rapidly: by 1889, Metropolitan Life had outgrown the Church Street building. The company had $250 million in industrial life insurance policies by 1891.

At the time, life insurance companies generally had their own buildings for their offices and branch locations. According to architectural writer Kenneth Gibbs, these buildings allowed each individual company to instill "not only its name but also a favorable impression of its operations" in the general public. This had been a trend since 1870, with the completion of the former Equitable Life Building in Manhattan's Financial District. Furthermore, life insurance companies of the late 19th and early 20th centuries generally built massive buildings to fit their large clerical and records-keeping staff.

=== Original home office construction ===
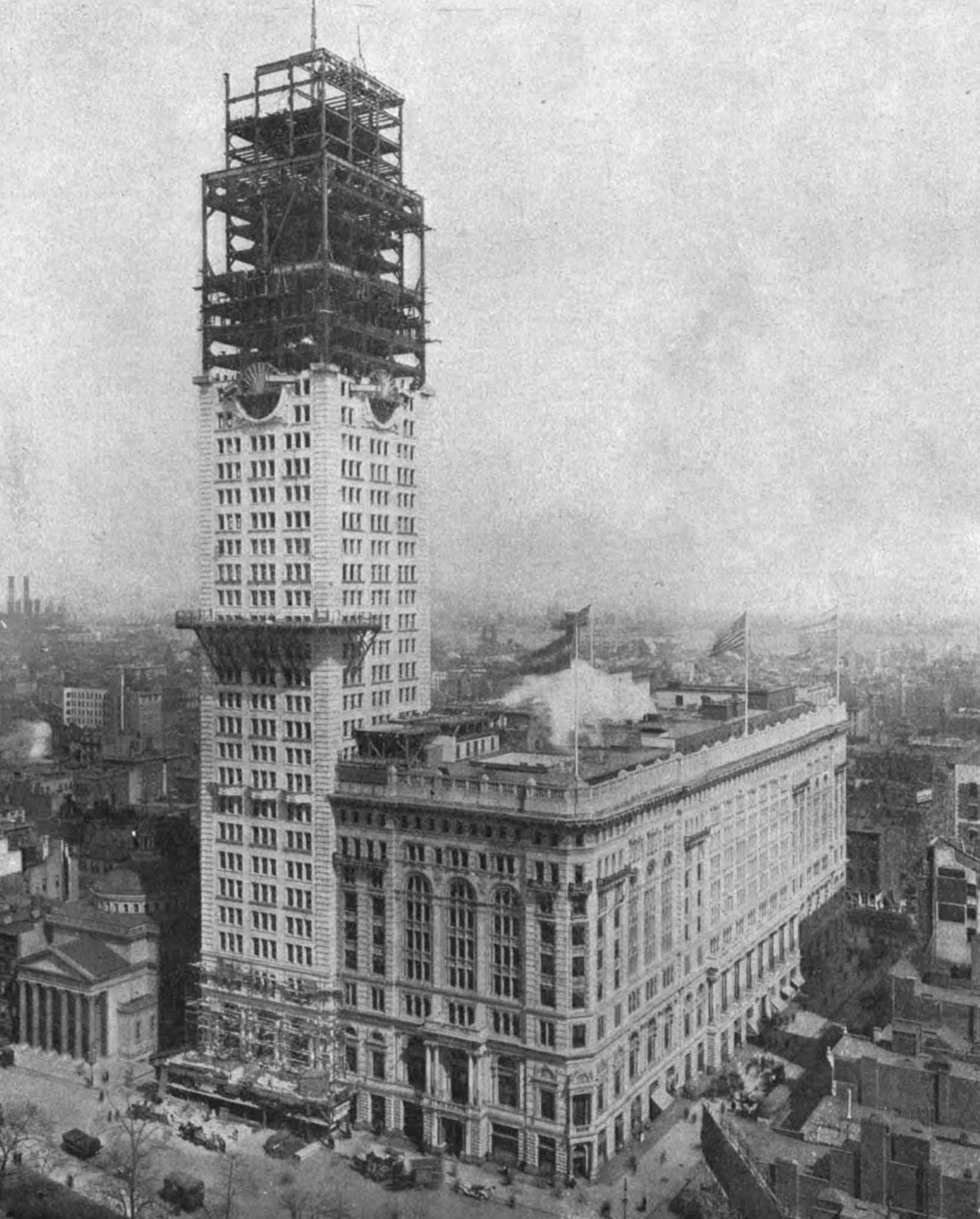
Tower portion under construction in 1908; the home office has already been completed

In 1890, the company purchased the 125-by-145-foot (38 by 44 m) site at the corner of Madison Avenue and 23rd Street, across from Madison Square Park. Joseph Fairchild Knapp, Metropolitan Life's president, (Note: Joseph F. Knapp was also the father of philanthropist Joseph P. Knapp.) hired Napoleon LeBrun to design a seven-story Italian Renaissance office building on 23rd Street between Madison Avenue and Fourth Avenue. Work commenced in May 1890 with the demolition of five brownstone mansions at 23rd Street and Madison Avenue. Knapp died before the structure's completion, and the building was subsequently expanded to 11 stories. Metropolitan Life occupied the second through fifth floors for its own use, but soon afterward expanded to the sixth and ninth stories, while filling the ground-story storefront spaces. The company occupied the first portion of the home office in early 1893. At the time, it had 650 workers.

The first section of the home office was completed in mid-1894. By that time, the company had full control of almost all lots on the north side of 23rd Street between Madison and Fourth Avenues, as well as a frontage of 115 feet (35 m) on 24th Street. One lot on 23rd Street was not acquired until June 1895; once Metropolitan Life bought that plot, it built a two-story structure on the remaining plot, which was later raised to 11 stories. Meanwhile, Metropolitan Life built a 12-story building on the plots along 24th Street, which was completed in October 1895 and was occupied that November. Additionally, the Standard National Bank opened a branch on the home office's Madison Avenue side in 1895. Metropolitan Life made a purchase offer for the National Academy of Design site at Fourth Avenue and 23rd Street in 1894; however, the company did not acquire title to the land until June 1899, thus completing its property acquisition on 23rd Street. An eastern extension of the home office to Fourth Avenue opened in 1901, followed by an L-shaped extension along 24th Street and Fourth Avenue in 1902, which enclosed the southwest corner of that intersection.

Most of the lots on the 24th Street side were purchased starting in 1894 for the construction of a 12-story addition to the home office. The company bought the Lyceum Theatre site on Fourth Avenue in 1902. Metropolitan Life bought the corner of Fourth Avenue and 24th Street in 1902–1903 and constructed the next portion of the home office on the Lyceum Theatre and Academy of Design sites. That section was occupied in May 1906. By 1905, Metropolitan Life had acquired most of the lots on the south side of 24th Street between Madison and Fourth avenues. The only lot the company had not acquired was the Madison Square Presbyterian Church, built in 1854 at the southeastern corner of Madison Avenue and 24th Street. The gradual development of the block had led to the construction of other skyscrapers surrounding Madison Square, such as the Flatiron Building in 1902 and the Fifth Avenue Building (now the Toy Center) in 1908.

=== Tower construction ===
In April 1906, Metropolitan Life bought the church lot, on which it intended to build a 560-foot (170 m) tower. The church building was razed soon after the purchase of the site. In exchange for Metropolitan Life's purchase, the church received a 75-by-150-foot (23 by 46 m) plot of land across 24th Street that became the site for Stanford White's 1906 building for the Madison Square Presbyterian Church, sometimes called the "Parkhurst Church" after Reverend Charles Henry Parkhurst. Plans for the proposed clock tower were filed with the New York City Department of Buildings in January 1907. At the time, the tower was to rise 690 feet (210 m) above ground, with 48 usable stories, or 50 total. The building plans were modified in April 1908, providing for a 54-story tower, though the additional four stories were not built.

By February 1908, thirty-one stories of the tower had been built. The lower floors of the Metropolitan Life Tower were occupied by May 1908. The tower was topped out the following month. The Metropolitan Life Tower was not completed until 1909, with one of its original tenants being the National Kindergarten Association. The tower had cost $6.58 million, and the expanded complex had 2,800 workers at the time of the tower's completion. Metropolitan Life officials held a jubilee dinner in January 1910 to celebrate the tower's completion. The tower was the world's tallest building until 1913, when it was surpassed by the Woolworth Building in Tribeca, within lower Manhattan. A 1914 company history estimated that the entire complex could accommodate 20,000 visitors and tenants per day.

=== Addition of northern annexes ===
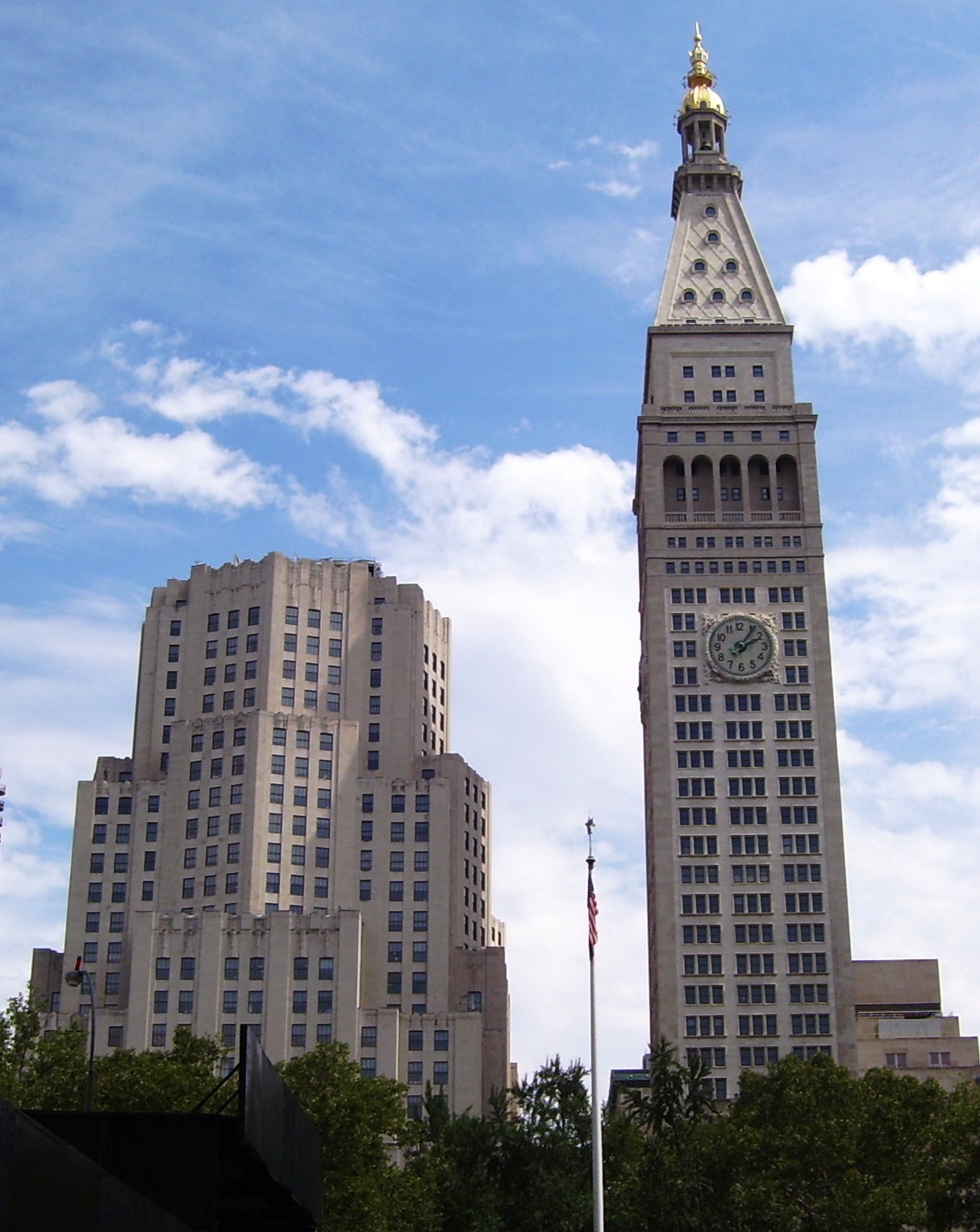
The Metropolitan Life Insurance Company Tower (right) and the Metropolitan Life North Building (left)

A plot on the north side of 24th Street, measuring 75 by 100 feet (23 by 30 m), was developed from 1903 to 1905 as the first Metropolitan Annex, a 16-story printing plant building faced in Tuckahoe marble. The annex was designed by LeBrun, and it was connected to the main building by a tunnel. White's 1906 church building was demolished in 1919 to make way for an expansion of the northern annex, which was 18 stories tall. This annex was designed by D. Everett Waid and completed in 1921. The bank vault was designed by Frederick S. Holmes.

By the late 1920s, the clock tower, home office, and LeBrun's and Waid's northern annexes were becoming too small to house the continuously growing activities of the Metropolitan Life Insurance Company. Looking to expand, the company acquired a full-block site directly to the north, between East 24th and 25th Streets. Architects Harvey Wiley Corbett and D. Everett Waid took up the project in 1928. The approved design for what would become the Metropolitan Life North Building was for a 100-story tower, but the onset of the Great Depression in 1929 caused the company to build only the 28-story base, which was built in three stages. LeBrun's and Waid's northern annexes remained until 1946, when they were demolished to make way for the final stage of the North Building. The North Building was completed in 1950 with the structural strength and the number of elevator shafts needed for a possible future expansion.

=== Late 20th century ===
==== 1950s and 1960s renovation ====
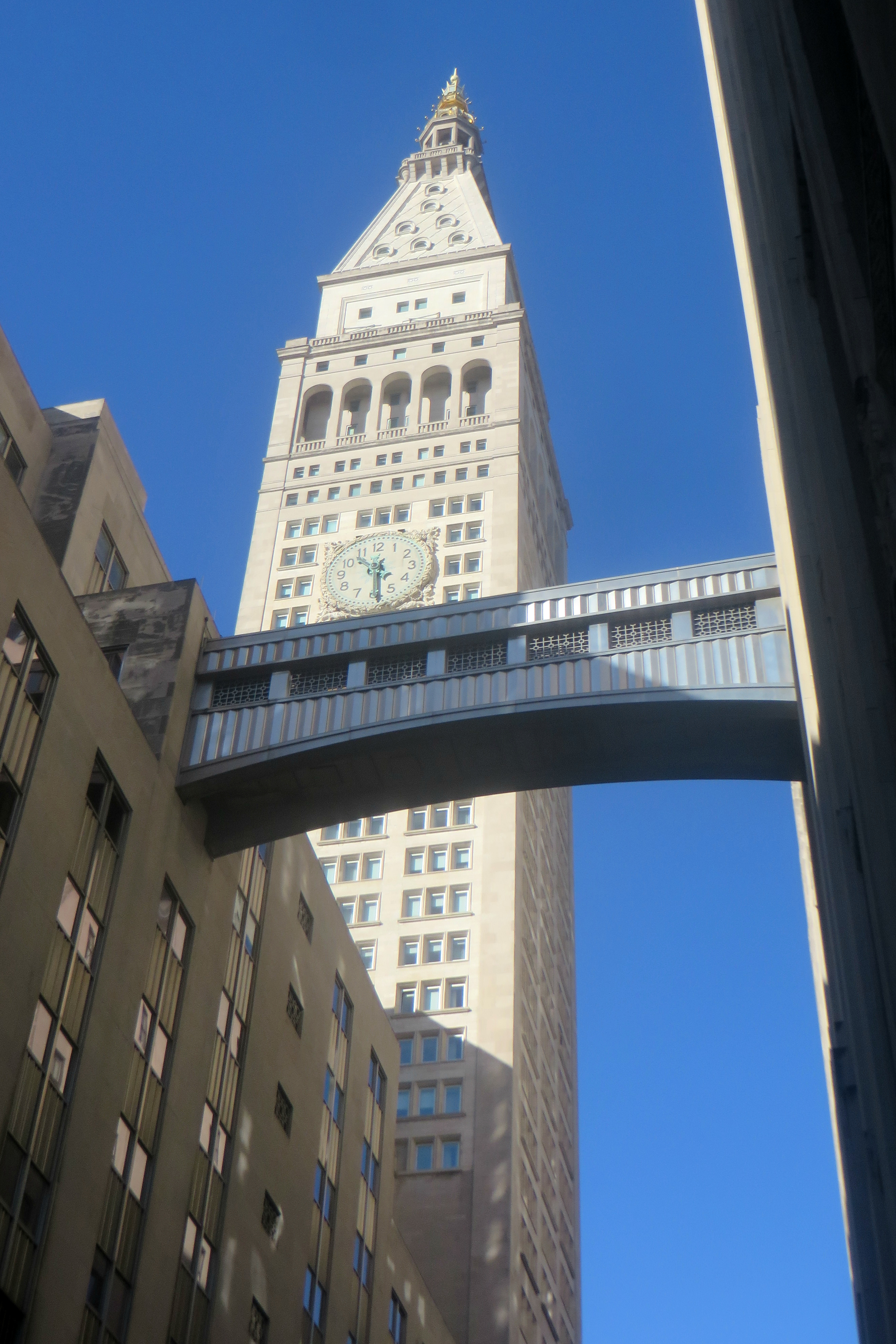
A sky bridge connected the east wing (left) and the tower (center) with the Met Life North Annex (right).

Even with the addition of the North Building, the number of staff in the complex was steadily increasing, with 14,500 workers by 1938. To alleviate this, in 1950, Metropolitan Life announced that it would refurbish its entire headquarters. The initial plans were filed by Leonard Schultz and Associates, but after Schultz's 1951 death, Lloyd Morgan and Eugene Meroni took up the design process. In 1952, Morgan and Meroni filed plans with the New York City Department of Buildings for a completely new structure on the site of the existing home offices. A Metropolitan Life press release stated that a new structure was chosen over a renovation because the new structure would have more interior floor space, due to the elimination of the interior courtyard inside the old building, and because new construction was cheaper than renovation.

Work started in 1953, and the company demolished auxiliary structures to make way for the new home office building. The tunnel to the northern annex was retained, and a sky bridge was built at the eighth floor of the new building. To minimize disruption to Metropolitan Life's operations, the new home office was erected in two stages, so construction on one part of the home office could go on while normal operations proceeded in the other portion. The first stage was built between 1953 and 1957; the second, between 1958 and 1960.

The tower, the sole structure on the block that remained from the early 20th century, was renovated starting in 1961 to harmonize the design with Morgan and Meroni's east wing. The firm of Starrett Brothers & Eken was the general contractor, and Purdy and Henderson were the structural engineers. During this time, the clock, bells, and roof were rebuilt. The renovation also remodeled the facade so it would be stylistically similar to the east wing, and so the decaying marble was replaced with limestone. Morgan eliminated most of the ornamentation added by LeBrun, though he preserved the clock tower's general proportions, and designed the east wing so that the tower would rise behind setbacks on the 10th, 11th, and 13th floors. The project was completed in 1964.

==== 1970s through 1990s ====
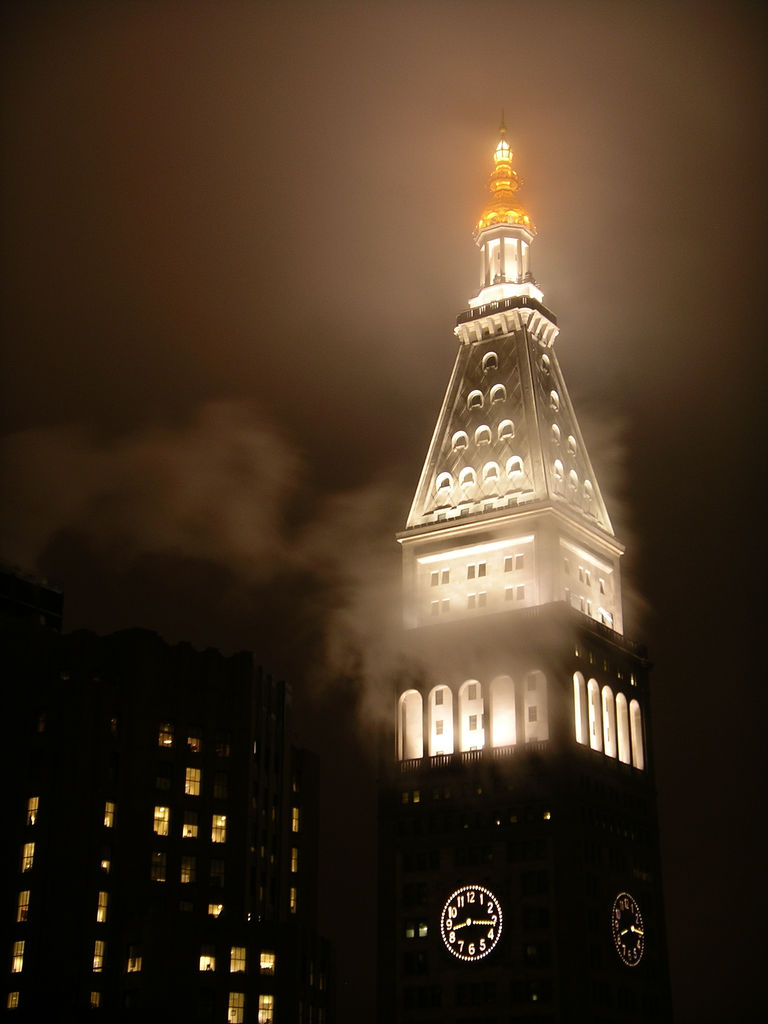
Seen at night

In 1982, the Cross & Brown Company leased out four of the floors in the clock tower, the first time in the building's history that space in the tower had been leased to outside tenants. The tower's floor areas were optimal for small organizations, and in 1985, Metropolitan Life vacated the tower, moving all remaining operations to the North Building and the South Building's east wing. At the time, 26 of the 40 lower floors had already been leased.

The South Building underwent a $35 million exterior restoration project between 1998 and 2002. During this time, the tower's marble facade was repaired, a new multicolored lighting system was added, and the cupola was re-gilded. Because the clock tower had been added to the National Register of Historic Places in 1972, MetLife was eligible for a tax break on the building.

=== 21st century ===
In March 2005, SL Green Realty bought the building, intending to convert the clock tower to apartments. The east wing at One Madison Avenue was part of the sale but was not converted to apartments, instead being leased to Credit Suisse First Boston until at least 2020. Credit Suisse decided in 2017 to leave the building, and the offices were cleared out three years later.

==== Conversion of clock tower to hotel ====
SL Green sold the tower and adjacent air rights for $200 million to Africa Israel Investments in May 2007. In 2011, Tommy Hilfiger and a partner signed a contract to buy the clock tower for $170 million, planning to transform it into Hilfiger's first hotel, with luxury condominiums. Hilfiger backed off the project in September 2011. Africa Israel then sold the tower to Marriott International in October 2011 for $165 million. Marriott announced in January 2012 that it was converting the tower to the New York EDITION Hotel, one of three boutique hotels in the EDITION line. The EDITION Hotels were sold in January 2013 to the Abu Dhabi Investment Authority for $815 million. The New York property was conveyed to its new owner on its completion. Marriott continues to manage the hotels under long-term contract, and the New York EDITION Hotel opened in May 2015.

==== Expansion of One Madison Avenue ====
SL Green announced plans in July 2018 to renovate One Madison Avenue when Credit Suisse's lease expired. After an architectural design competition with five architects, SL Green hired Kohn Pedersen Fox in December 2018. The existing 14-story structure would be reduced to nine floors, and eighteen stories would be built above the ninth floor. Tishman Construction was the general contractor, while Severud Associates was the structural engineer on the project. Construction on the renovation started in November 2020, after SL Green received a $1.25 billion construction loan. The sky bridge to the North Building was demolished as part of the redevelopment of One Madison Avenue. The glass addition and the renovation of One Madison Avenue was developed by SL Green, Hines, and the National Pension Service of Korea at a cost of $2.3 billion.

Demolition of the old facade was completed by mid-2021, and workers gutted the interior of the east wing. They started constructing the foundation and mega-columns before demolition was complete; this involved constructing a concrete core, removing alternating columns, and strengthening existing columns. Because the clock tower was subject to city-landmark regulations, workers also had to reconstruct part of the tower's facade, which had been left exposed after part of the annex was demolished. SL Green sold a 25 percent interest in the project to an unidentified investor in December 2021, although it retained a 25.5 percent interest. The sale came shortly after Chelsea Piers Fitness leased space in the building, becoming the redeveloped structure's first large tenant. IBM became the building's anchor tenant in March 2022. Other initial tenants of the rebuilt building included Coinbase, Flutter Entertainment, Franklin Templeton Investments, Palo Alto Networks, and a steakhouse and terrace operated by Daniel Boulud.

One Madison Avenue topped out during December 2022, and installation of the building's curtain wall began in early 2023. By that September, the One Madison Avenue annex was nearly complete, and the building had received a temporary certificate of occupancy; at the time, the space in the glass addition had been nearly fully leased. Around two-thirds of One Madison Avenue's space had been leased by April 2024, and all of the storefronts were leased out by that July.

== Impact ==
=== Company promotion ===
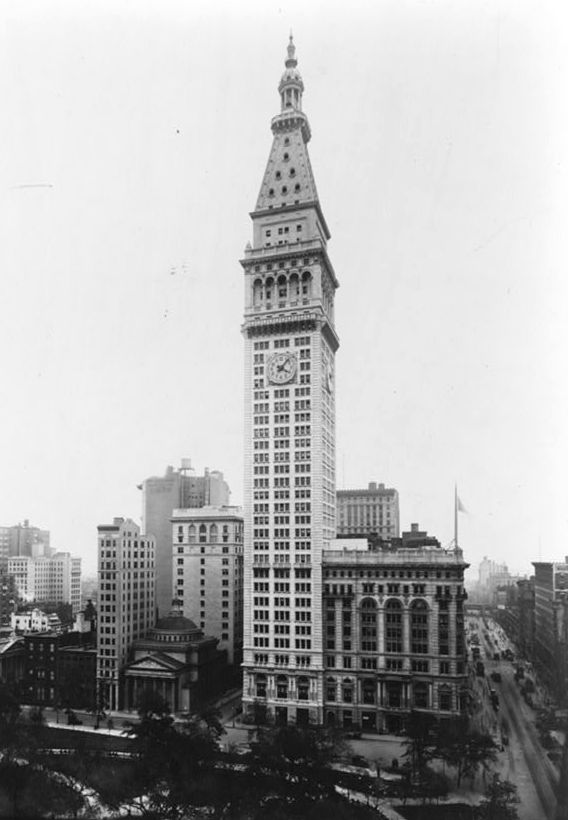
Seen from the west in 1911

Metropolitan Life intended the tower to promote the company's image, with company president John Rogers Hegeman calling the building "a symbol of integrity". As such, the tower was surrounded by publicity. It was featured on the front of prominent magazines such as Scientific American, as well as on the sides of corn flake boxes, coffee packets, and cars. Metropolitan Life valued the free publicity surrounding its skyscraper at over $440,000 (equivalent to $16 million in 2025). The company also published three oversized monographs with images featuring the building, in 1907, 1908, and 1914.

The tower figured prominently in Metropolitan Life's advertising for many years, illustrated with a light beaming from a lantern at the top of its spire and the slogan "The Light That Never Fails". While other life insurance companies, such as the New York Life Insurance Company and Equitable Insurance Company, used sculptural representations for their respective symbols, Metropolitan Life used the building itself to represent the company's work and ideals.

=== Reception ===
Though not structurally distinctive, the Metropolitan Life Tower nevertheless was highly scrutinized, being the world's tallest building upon its completion. The design of the tower won critical acclaim within the American architectural profession. The American Institute of Architects' New York chapter called the clock tower "the most meritorous work of the year" upon its completion. The writer Roberta Moudry observed that "the tower appeared from [Madison Square Park] as an entity unto itself", distinct from other tall structures nearby, and at the time of its construction, "serve[d] as a timely large-scale public declaration of civic stature and ethical responsibility". The New York City Landmarks Preservation Commission described the original home office's design as doing "much to establish Metropolitan Life in the eyes and the mind of the public." In a company history book written shortly after the building's completion, Metropolitan Life had characterized the structure as "the most beautiful home office in the world".

Members of the public also viewed the clock tower positively, with one anonymous reviewer calling the clock "a reassuring melody to hear on a trustworthy schedule". One newspaper columnist stated that when the clock faces' hands were taken apart for cleaning in 1937, "letters poured in, asking what went on". On December 11, 1984, to celebrate the building's 75th anniversary, the United States Postal Service issued a pictorial cancellation that depicted the Metropolitan Life Tower, which was available only on that day.

Audrey Wachs of Curbed wrote in 2023 that, although the clock tower was by then "one of the stubbier silhouettes on the city skyline", it still "dominates" its neighborhood. Wachs also wrote that, "compared with its showy predecessor, One Madison Avenue is an introvert" because the annex's trusses and terraces could not be seen from ground level, and because the glass curtain walls were not fully transparent due to the presence of window screens. Justin Davidson, writing for the same publication in 2024, described the clock tower and the two annexes as symbolizing the fact that "the architecture of business changes, and it's always chasing the future".

=== Landmark designations ===
The South Building's tower was added to the National Register of Historic Places in 1972, and it was designated a National Historic Landmark in 1978; however, the National Historic Landmark status was granted because of Metropolitan Life's role in American commerce, not for the building's architectural or engineering significance. The tower became a New York City designated landmark in 1989. The Metropolitan Life Home Office Complex, which includes the tower and the adjacent North Building, was added to the National Register on January 19, 1996. The east wing was not included in the Home Office Complex designation, nor in any of the other landmark designations, due to its relatively recent construction.

== See also ==
- Early skyscrapers
- List of tallest buildings in the United States
- List of National Historic Landmarks in New York City
- List of New York City Designated Landmarks in Manhattan from 14th to 59th Streets
- National Register of Historic Places listings in Manhattan from 14th to 59th Streets

Records
Preceded by Singer Building	Tallest building in the world 1909–1913	Succeeded by Woolworth Building
Preceded by Singer Building	Tallest building in the United States; 1909–1913	Succeeded by Woolworth Building
