= Goodwin House =

Goodwin House may mean:

- Goodwin House (Ottawa), Ontario
- Goodwin House (Brookhaven, Georgia), adjacent to Atlanta
- Goodwin House, oldest building in Suwanee, Georgia
