= Alexander W. Farlinger =

Canadian businessman and councilman

AlexanderW. Farlinger (1861-1925) was a grocery store owner, businessman, and councilman in Atlanta, Georgia. He built the four-story Eclectic Victorian Farlinger Apartments building designed by George W. Laine in 1898. It became a Hotel Francis. It was listed on the National Register of Historic Places in 1981 and demolished in 1988.

Born in Canada, he arrived in Atlanta about 1885. He opened a grocery store. He served as president of the National Retail Grocers Association. The Farlinger building housed his grocery store on the ground floor and a cafe on the fourth floor. It was then in the city's northern suburbs but commercial development grew around it in the early 20th century. In 1910, the president of Atlanta Fertilizer Works, William H. McKenzie, bought the building for $125,000 and renamed it The Franceis for his wife. In 1930 it became a hotel.

Farlinger was active in politics. He advocated for construction of the Spring Street Viaduct and for Oglethorpe University to locate in the city. He served on its Board of Founders. He was a city councilman from 1912 to 1915.

He served as Secretary for the Atlanta Theological Seminary's Board of Trustees. He was active in the Congregational Church. He was a party in a real estate lawsuit.

He spoke in support of pure food laws.

As councilmen, he and Claude Ashley were leaders for a Ku Klux Klan inspired 1915 rally at Grace Methodist Church in support of racial segregation in housing.

== See also ==
- Hotel Ansley
