= Brookhaven, Georgia =

City in Georgia, United States

- City
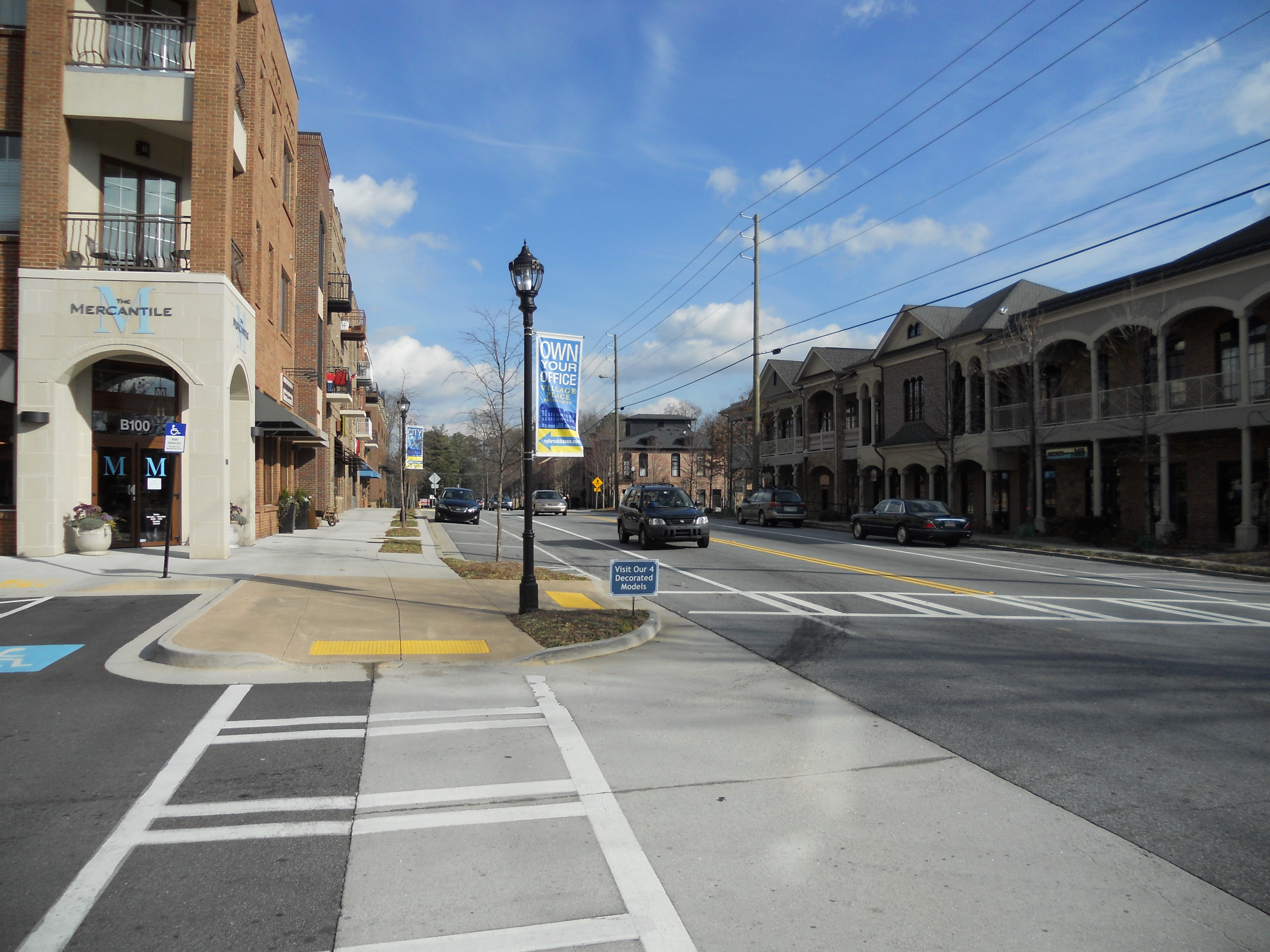
- Brookhaven Village, located on Dresden Drive east of Peachtree Road

- Flag Seal Logo
- Interactive map of Brookhaven, Georgia
- Coordinates: 33°51′33″N 84°20′20″W
- Country: United States
- State: Georgia
- County: DeKalb

Government
  - Mayor: John Park
  - City Manager: Christian Sigman

Area
  - Total: 11.86 sq mi (30.71 km^{2})
  - Land: 11.73 sq mi (30.39 km^{2})
  - Water: 0.12 sq mi (0.31 km^{2})

Population (2020)
  - Total: 55,161
  - Estimate (2023): 57,945
  - Density: 4,700.4/sq mi (1,814.85/km^{2})
- Time zone: UTC-5 (Eastern (EST))
  - Summer (DST): UTC-4 (EDT)
- ZIP codes: 30319, 30341
- Area code: 404/470/678/770
- FIPS code: 13-10944
- GNIS feature ID: 331243
- Website: brookhavenga.gov

Brookhaven, formerly North Atlanta, is a city in the northeastern suburbs of Atlanta that is located in western DeKalb County, Georgia, United States, directly northeast of Atlanta. On July 31, 2012, Brookhaven was approved in a referendum to become DeKalb County's 11th city. Incorporation officially took place on December 17, 2012, on which date municipal operations commenced. The new city stretches over 12 square miles (31 km^{2}). With a population of 56,795 as of the 2020 census, it is the second largest city located fully within DeKalb County, behind Stonecrest.

== History ==
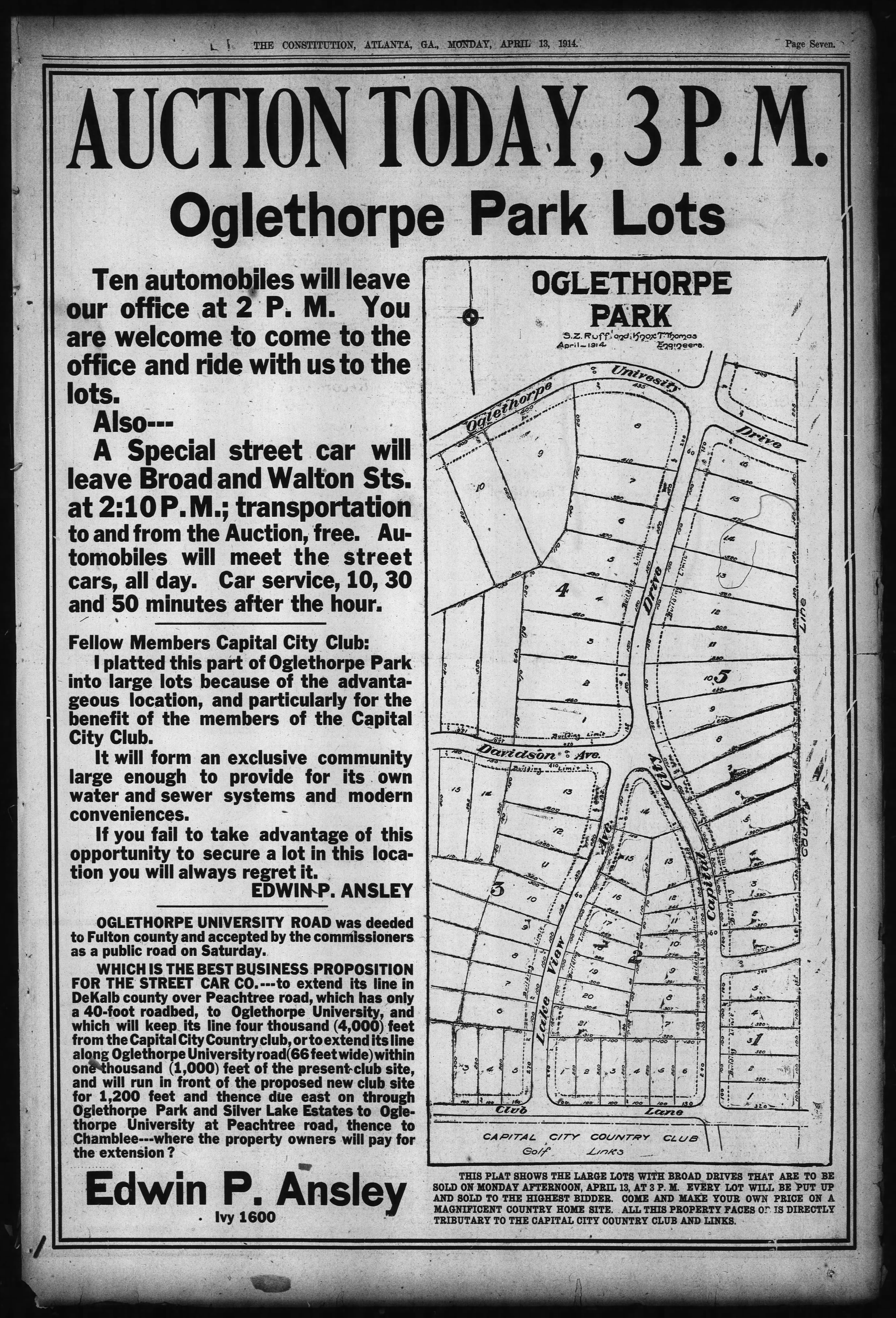
1914 ad in Atlanta Constitution, offering Oglethorpe Park lots for sale

Creek people inhabited the area.

Brookhaven's first permanent European settler was John Evins, who started a plantation around 1810. Harris and Solomon Goodwin, who moved to Georgia from South Carolina, became owners of the land in the 1830s. The Goodwin home and the family graveyard have been preserved at the 3900 block of Peachtree Road, near Dresden Drive. A train station known as Goodwin's was constructed along the Atlanta and Richmond (later Atlanta and Charlotte) railway in 1873.

The settlement of Cross Keys, with a population of 250 in 1876, was located one mile (1.6 km) north along the rail line from Goodwin's. In 1879 Cross Keys was described:

Nancy's Creek furnished power for operating a mill. The place has two churches—Methodist and Baptist—one common school, and steam cotton gins. Cotton and wood form the chief exports. About 140 bales of cotton shipped per annum, most of which is carried to Atlanta by wagon. Population within a radius of 2 miles [3.2 km], near 400. Mail daily… Depot and station [is] one and one-quarter miles [2.0 km] distant [from] this place.

Atlanta residents began constructing summer cottages in the community around 1900. In 1910, 150 acres (61 ha) on the north side of Peachtree Road were purchased for development as a planned community surrounding a golf course. The nine-hole golf course, designed by Herbert Barker, a golf pro from Garden City, Long Island, opened in 1912. Residences developed in three phases, with Brookhaven Estates designed in 1910, followed by Country Club Estates in 1929 and the Carleton Operating Company in 1936. Independently, Edwin P. Ansley sold lots in the area, calling it Oglethorpe Park. Construction of the historic neighborhood was largely complete by the end of World War II. The country club became part of the downtown Capital City Club in 1911, and its name was changed to the Capital City Country Club. The golf course was expanded from nine to eighteen holes in 1915. The clubhouse, designed by Preston Stevens in the French Provincial style, was completed in 1928. The area was incorporated as the city of North Atlanta in 1924. In 1963, the North Atlanta's leaders asked the state legislature to allow a referendum on a new city charter. The legislature agreed, but also included an additional option in the referendum: disincorporation. The majority of voters chose disincorporation, and the city's charter was dissolved in 1965. The U.S. Census Bureau statistically counted the North Atlanta census-designated place up to the 2010 U.S. census.

From the 1950s to the 1970s, major commercial and residential development took place in Brookhaven, resulting in the area being largely built-out by 1980. The Brookhaven/Oglethorpe MARTA Station opened in 1984. In 1986, the Capital City Country Club and its surrounding estate homes were placed on the National Register of Historic Places, and the neighborhood is now officially known as "Historic Brookhaven."

The idea of incorporating Brookhaven as a city was first brought up in 2007, with the purpose of securing local community control over planning, zoning, land use, police, fire protection, and parks and recreation—rather than having those issues decided by the county. However, the idea failed to gain momentum. The proposed city would have included 53,000 people. In 2011, the incorporation of Brookhaven was revived when state Rep. Mike Jacobs announced plans to introduce legislation allowing the creation of a city of Brookhaven, over the objections of many residents of the neighborhood of Historic Brookhaven, which would not lie in the proposed city boundaries. On July 31, 2012, 55% of voters chose to incorporate the city of Brookhaven. In December of that same year, J. Max Davis was elected as the city's first mayor.

== Geography ==
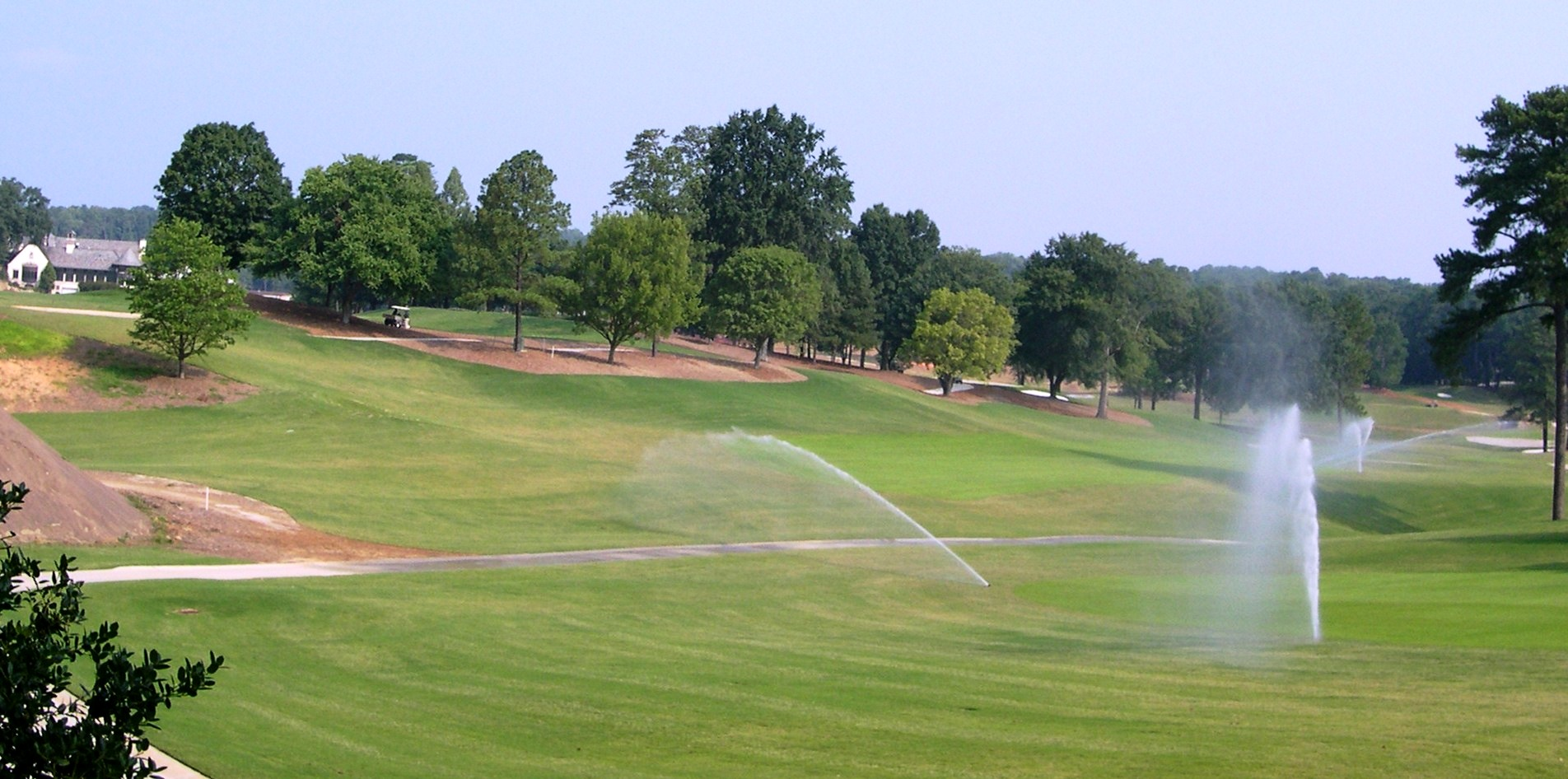
Capital City Club Golf Course

Brookhaven is located at 33°52′47″N 84°21′6″W (33.879722, -84.351667). The city of Brookhaven is bounded by:

- The Fulton County line on the west,
- unincorporated DeKalb County south of Briarcliff and LaVista Roads on the south,
- Clairmont Road and the city of Chamblee at Chamblee Dunwoody Road on the east, and
- the city of Dunwoody at I-285 on the north

See the official City of Brookhaven map and visit: https://gis.brookhavenga.gov/citymap/

=== Neighborhoods and districts ===
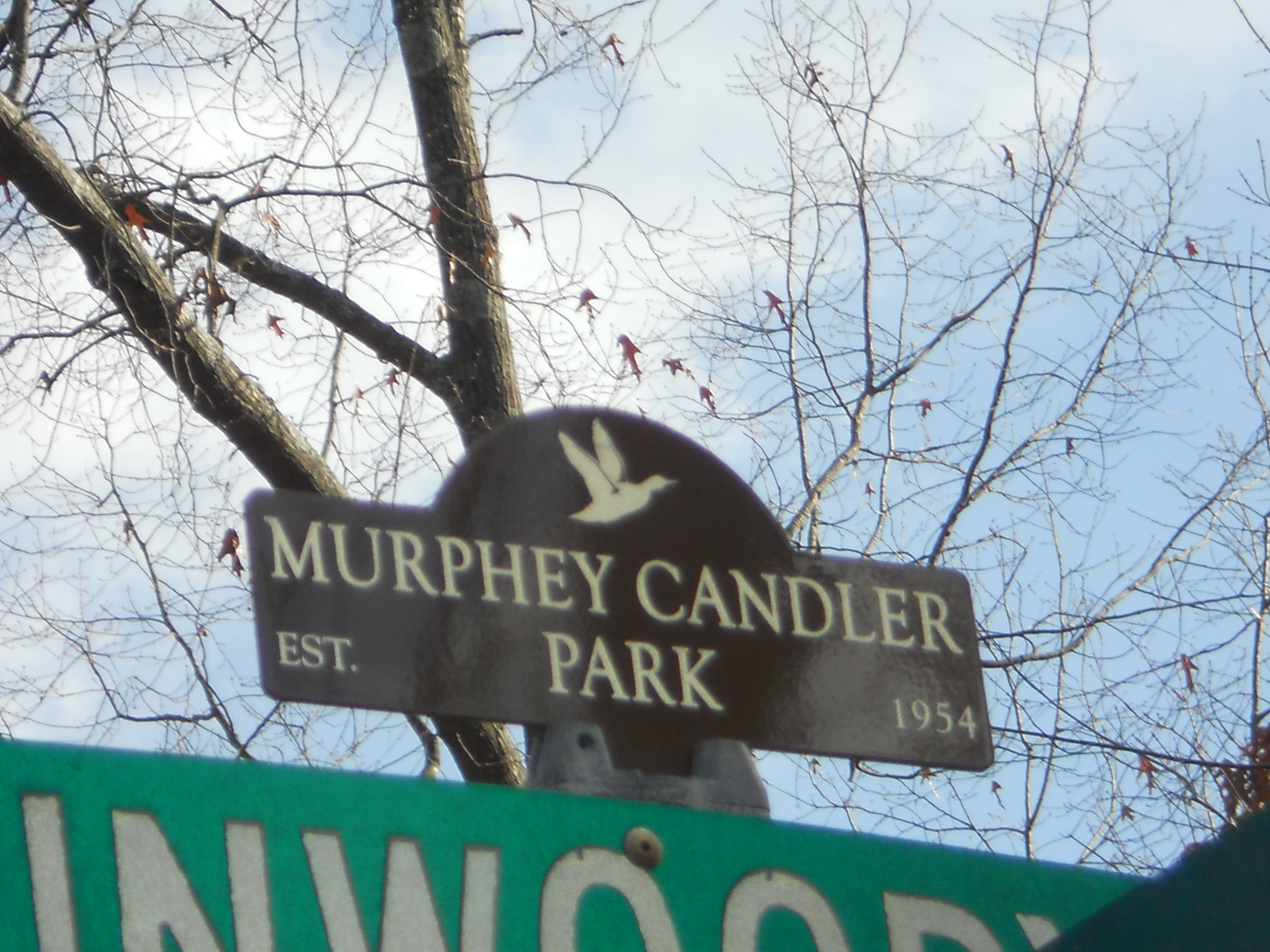
A street-sign topper of Murphey Candler Park, a residential neighborhood located in North Brookhaven

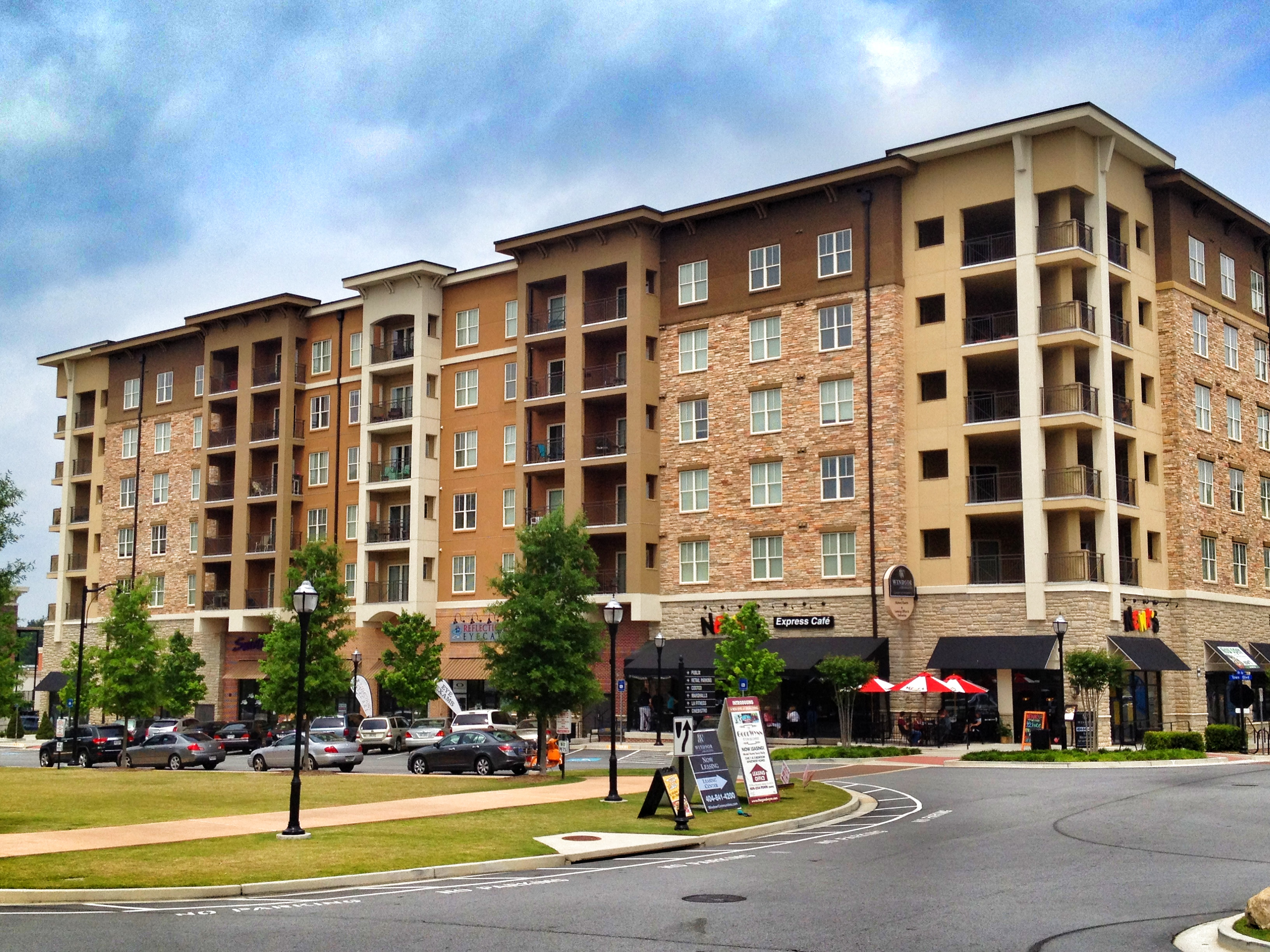
Town Brookhaven mixed-use development

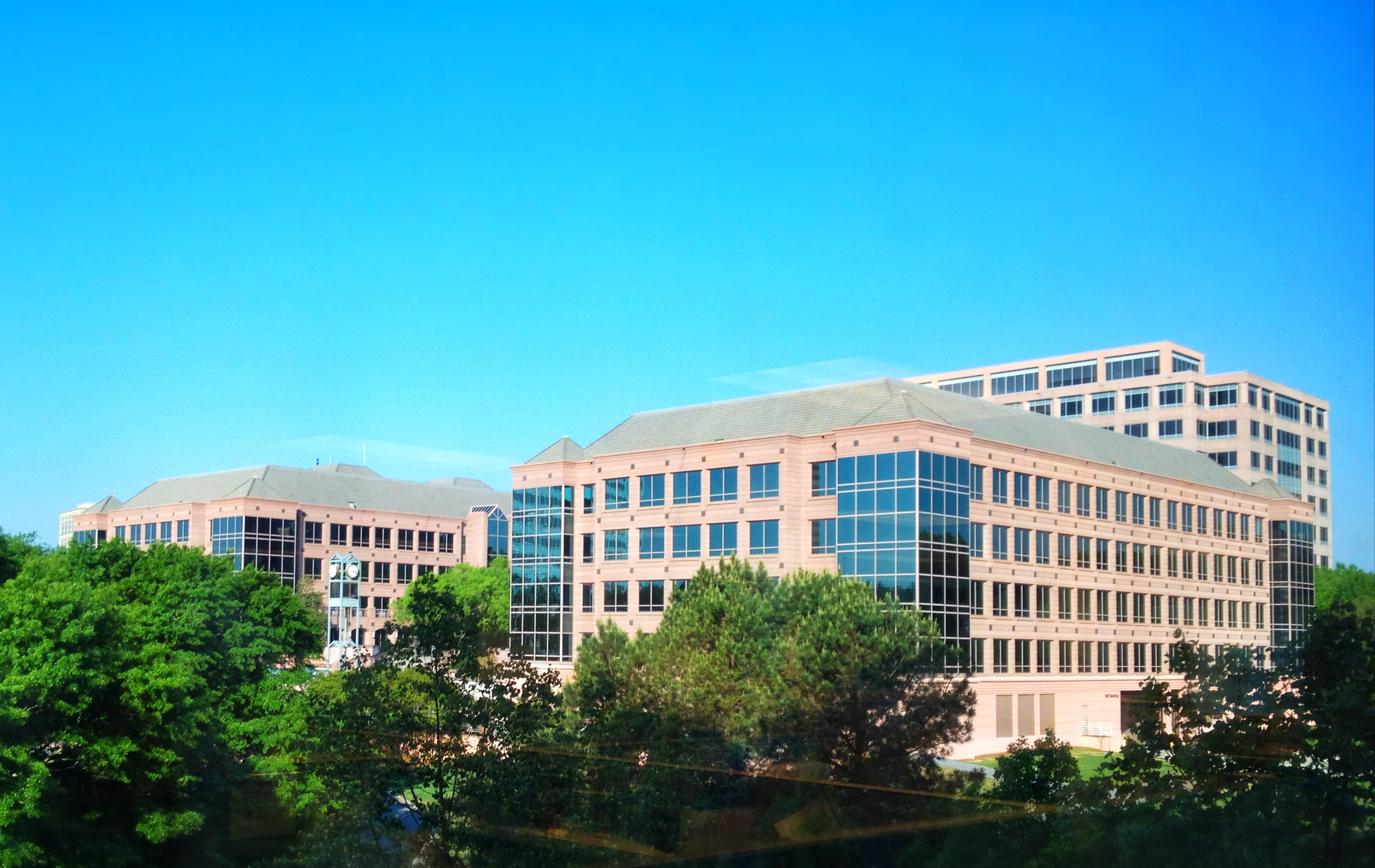
AT&T Mobility headquarters (and other AT&T departments) in Lenox Park

- Historic Brookhaven: Historic Brookhaven is the historic residential neighborhood from which the area derives its name. It has homes surrounding the Capital City Country Club, many designed by a number of well-known Atlanta architects of the pre-war period. The neighborhood boundaries are well defined, and it stretches from Peachtree Dunwoody Road on the west, Windsor Parkway to the north, Mabry Drive to the east, and Peachtree Road to the south. A majority of the neighborhood technically lies within the extreme northeastern section of the city of Atlanta.
- Brookhaven Village: Brookhaven Village is the name given to the urban town center that has emerged on Dresden Drive, just east of the Brookhaven MARTA station, anchored by the Village Place and Village Park Place mixed-use developments, envisioned and developed by Dan Woodley. The village is bordered by the residential neighborhoods of Ashford Park to the north and with Brookhaven Fields and Drew Valley to the south, both offering single family homes within walking distance of the village. The village is home to commercial establishments, residences, and offices.
- Lynwood Park: Lynwood Park was historically an African-American neighborhood of wood and cinderblock homes in the small area north of Windsor Parkway and east of Sandy Springs. In the last decade, residents seeking a new home in a close-in location have built craftsman-style homes, contributing to the overall improvement of the area's infrastructure. The community is home to a large park, Lynwood Park, which features basketball courts, tennis courts, a swimming pool, a recreation center, a playground and picnic area.
- Peachtree Road: Peachtree Road connects Brookhaven to Buckhead and Chamblee. Much of Brookhaven's commercial developments are situated along Peachtree, including Town Brookhaven, a 600,000-square-foot (56,000 m^{2}) mixed-use district located at Peachtree Road and Town Boulevard, adjacent to Oglethorpe University. In addition to major commercial tenants, there are more than 1500 residential units and 150,000 square feet (14,000 m^{2}) of office space in Town Brookhaven.
- North Brookhaven: North Brookhaven refers to the area that is bounded by I-285 to the north, the Fulton County line to the west, Chamblee to the east, and Windsor Parkway to the south. More specifically, the term describes the area that makes up the majority of District 1 of the city of Brookhaven. From 1924 to 1965, the area was incorporated as the city of North Atlanta, which included all of North Brookhaven as well as areas south to Peachtree Road. Largely suburban in character, the area is home to various residential subdivisions; two large parks, Blackburn Park and Murphey Candler Park, and the Nancy Creek PATH trail; the historic Peachtree Golf Club, which was founded by Bobby Jones and designed by Robert Trent Jones; and top rated public and private schools, including Marist School, Our Lady of the Assumption Catholic School, St. Martin's Episcopal School, Montgomery Elementary School, and the Kittredge Magnet School. The area also boasts two major lakes: the privately owned Silver Lake (surrounded by the Brittany, Cambridge Park, Hampton Hall, and Oglethorpe Estates neighborhoods) and the county owned Murphey Candler Lake. A restaurant and retail district, located at the intersection of Ashford Dunwoody and Johnson Ferry Roads, forms the commercial heart of North Brookhaven, occupying an area that was once known as Old Cross Keys, one of the earliest antebellum settlements in DeKalb County. Also located in North Brookhaven is Perimeter Summit, a commercial area that represents one third of Perimter Center. North Brookhaven, due to its proximity to Perimeter Center, has often been subjected to encroachment, resulting in the razing of Lake Hearn subdivision in 1989, a proposed extension of the Glenridge Connector in 1999, and the construction of a power station in 2007.
- Buford Highway: The Buford Highway corridor forms the southern portion of Brookhaven. The corridor is characterized by high-density housing with a large international population, mostly comprising Hispanic immigrants. Due to its international character and ethnic restaurants and businesses catering to a variety of groups, including Hispanic, Chinese, Vietnamese, and Korean, Buford Highway has become a testament to the Atlanta region's growing multiethnic makeup.
- Lenox Park: Lenox Park is a neighborhood of homes and office buildings located just east of the northern border of the city of Atlanta.
- LaVista Park: The LaVista Park neighborhood was annexed into the City of Brookhaven in 2019 in a unanimous decision by the Brookhaven City Council. The Council approved a rezoning and annexation of 676 parcels (approximately 2,000 residents) into the City of Brookhaven in what is believed to be the largest annexation using the 60% method in state history.

== Demographics ==
Historical population
Census	Pop.	Note	%±
1940	1,365		—
1950	5,930		334.4%
1960	12,661		113.5%
1980	30,521		—
1990	27,812		−8.9%
2000	38,579		38.7%
2010	40,456		4.9%
2020	55,161		36.3%
2025 (est.)	59,643	▲	8.1%
U.S. Decennial Census; 1850-1870 1870-1880; 1890-1910 1920-1930; 1940 1950 1960; 1970 1980 1990; 2000 2010 2020; 2025

The community first appeared in the 1940 U.S. census as the town of North Atlanta and redesignated as a village in the 1960 U.S. census. It was not listed in the 1970 U.S. census and reappeared in the 1980 U.S. census as the North Atlanta census designated place (CDP). After incorporation in 2012, it was redesignated as Brookhaven city in the 2020 U.S. census.

=== Racial and ethnic composition ===
Brookhaven, Georgia – Racial and ethnic composition Note: the U.S. census treats Hispanic/Latino as an ethnic category. This table excludes Latinos from the racial categories and assigns them to a separate category. Hispanics/Latinos may be of any race.
Race / Ethnicity (NH = Non-Hispanic)	Pop 2000	Pop 2010	Pop 2020	% 2000	% 2010	% 2020
White alone (NH)	18,770	19,287	30,423	48.65%	47.67%	55.15%
Black or African American alone (NH)	6,615	4,137	6,207	17.15%	10.23%	11.25%
Native American or Alaska Native alone (NH)	58	74	49	0.15%	0.18%	0.09%
Asian alone (NH)	1,864	1,898	3,979	4.83%	4.69%	7.21%
Native Hawaiian or Pacific Islander alone (NH)	14	19	14	0.04%	0.05%	0.03%
Other race alone (NH)	66	99	316	0.17%	0.24%	0.57%
Mixed Race or Multi-Racial (NH)	618	516	1,963	1.60%	1.28%	3.56%
Hispanic or Latino (any race)	10,574	14,426	12,210	27.41%	35.66%	22.14%
Total	38,579	40,456	55,161	100.00%	100.00%	100.00%

=== 2020 census ===
As of the 2020 census, Brookhaven had a population of 55,161. The median age was 33.9 years. 21.5% of residents were under the age of 18 and 10.0% of residents were 65 years of age or older. For every 100 females there were 96.4 males, and for every 100 females age 18 and over there were 94.1 males age 18 and over.

100.0% of residents lived in urban areas, while 0.0% lived in rural areas.

There were 24,212 households and 11,443 families in Brookhaven, of which 25.8% had children under the age of 18 living in them. Of all households, 38.8% were married-couple households, 23.6% were households with a male householder and no spouse or partner present, and 30.3% were households with a female householder and no spouse or partner present. About 37.4% of all households were made up of individuals and 7.7% had someone living alone who was 65 years of age or older.

There were 25,945 housing units, of which 6.7% were vacant. The homeowner vacancy rate was 1.9% and the rental vacancy rate was 8.0%.

Racial composition as of the 2020 census
Race	Number	Percent
White	31,946	57.9%
Black or African American	6,380	11.6%
American Indian and Alaska Native	595	1.1%
Asian	4,002	7.3%
Native Hawaiian and Other Pacific Islander	18	0.0%
Some other race	6,763	12.3%
Two or more races	5,457	9.9%
Hispanic or Latino (of any race)	12,210	22.1%

=== 2022 American Community Survey ===
According to the As of 2022 American Community Survey estimates, there were 56,848 people and 24,369 households. The population density was 4,634.2 inhabitants per square mile (1,789.3/km^{2}). There were 27,597 housing units at an average density of 2,249.7 units per square mile (868.6 units/km^{2}).

Of the 24,369 households, 25.8% had children under the age of 18 living with them, 17.8% had seniors 65 years or older living with them, 39.5% were married couples living together, 7.6% were couples cohabitating, 22.0% had a male householder with no partner present, and 30.9% had a female householder with no partner present. The median household size was 2.30 and the median family size was 3.17.

The age distribution was 22.2% under 18, 8.1% from 18 to 24, 37.0% from 25 to 44, 22.6% from 45 to 64, and 10.2% who were 65 or older. The median age was 34.6 years. For every 100 females, there were 91.8 males.

The median income for a household was $114,570, with family households having a median income of $188,477 and non-family households $81,572. The per capita income was $74,964. Males working full-time jobs had median earnings of $104,841 compared to $86,519 for females. Out of the 55,981 people with a determined poverty status, 10.6% were below the poverty line. Further, 20.4% of minors and 12.0% of seniors were below the poverty line.

Per the 2022 American Community Survey, the racial and ethnic makeup of the city was 65.3% White, 12.2% Black or African American, 6.8% Asian, 4.0% some other race, and 2.5% Native American or Alaskan Native, with 9.3% from two or more races. Hispanics or Latinos of any race were 17.6% of the population. In the survey, residents self-identified with various ethnic ancestries. People of English descent made up 11.7% of the population of the town, followed by American at 11.2%, German at 9.1%, Irish at 8.8%, Italian at 4.4%, Scottish at 2.5%, Polish at 2.1%, Russian at 2.0%, French at 1.8%, Scotch-Irish at 1.5%, Sub-Saharan African at 1.2%, Arab at 0.9%, Caribbean (excluding Hispanics) at 0.9%, Dutch at 0.8%, Welsh at 0.8%, Swedish at 0.7%, Greek at 0.5%, Hungarian at 0.5%, and Norwegian at 0.5%.

== Economy ==
Large retail centers in Brookhaven include the Town Brookhaven, a 600,000-square-foot (56,000 m^{2}) mixed-use district on a 54-acre (22 ha) site opened in 2010, and Northeast Plaza, a 466,000-square-foot (43,300 m^{2}), late-1950s strip mall-style shopping center on Buford Highway focused on discount and Hispanic-oriented stores.

On March 14, 2017, the Weather Company, owners of the Weather Channel, announced to a group of Brookhaven Chamber members that they were in need of more office space and would be selecting a location in Brookhaven. They have since moved to Brookhaven.

Brookhaven continues to see major developments in its area. In March 2019, the Brookhaven City Council approved a request from CHOA to rezone four acres in order to build an 8-story short-term residential hotel (a Ronald McDonald House). The facility will allow families to temporary stay in the area while their children are being treated at CHOA. Furthermore, Emory University announced in May 2019 that it plans to build a billion dollar medical complex including a hotel, hospital, and apartments in Brookhaven.

Other developments in Brookhaven include planned improvements to its Lynwood Park facility thanks to its partnership with the Atlanta Hawks. The Atlanta Hawks Foundation made a donation, approved unanimously by the city council, for upgraded furnishing and site improvements to the existing basketball court at Lynwood Park. As of 2017, the Hawks new $50 million training facility is located in Brookhaven.

== Education ==
Oglethorpe University, located on Peachtree Road

Colleges and universities in Brookhaven include Oglethorpe University as well Georgia State University's Brookhaven satellite campus for the Robinson College of Business MBA program. Both are located on Peachtree Road.

=== Primary and secondary schools ===
DeKalb County School System operates the public schools serving Brookhaven. The zoned public elementary schools within the city limits and serving the city are Ashford Park Elementary, Montclair Elementary, Montgomery Elementary, and Woodward Elementary. Additionally Fernbank and John Lewis elementaries, outside of the Brookhaven city limits, serve portions of the city. Montgomery Elementary is one of five residential public schools in all of Dekalb County to exceed 90% in every CRCT category. Kittredge Magnet School offers a program for high achieving students in grades 4 through 6. Students can submit an application or be selected through a lottery system in order to attend.

The public middle schools serving the city are Chamblee Middle School in Chamblee and Sequoyah Middle School in Doraville. The public high schools serving the city are Cross Keys High School in Brookhaven, and Chamblee Charter High School. Private schools include Our Lady of the Assumption Catholic School (Roman Catholic Archdiocese of Atlanta), St. Martin in the Fields Episcopal School, and Marist School.

PATH Academy, a charter school, is in Brookhaven.

From its opening in 1990 until 2003, the Seigakuin Atlanta International School was located on the property of Oglethorpe University. This facility is now occupied by PATH Academy.

=== Public libraries ===
DeKalb County Public Library operates the Brookhaven Library.

== Government ==
The City of Brookhaven is governed by a council-manager form of government. This form of governance combines an elected council composed of four members and a mayor with a professional manager who manages the day-to-day affairs of the city.

The city is divided into four distinct districts with each electing a representative for the city council every four years. Councilmembers may serve an unlimited number of consecutive terms subject to their reelection. The city's mayor is elected at large for a term of four years as well but is limited to serving two consecutive terms. The council is responsible for promoting the interests of their constituents and developing policy for the city's administration. The council also authorizes various legislative responsibilities such as determining strategic plans, capital improvement strategy and financing, the millage rate, and approving the annual budget.

The Brookhaven Council Composition as of January 2022

Mayor- John Arthur Ernst Jr.

Council Representative for District 1 and Mayor Pro Tempore - Linley Jones

Council Representative for District 2 - John Park

Council Representative for District 3 - Madeleine Simmons

Council Representative for District 4 - John Funny

Brookhaven's city manager is appointed by the Mayor and confirmed by the city council as the chief administrative officer for the city. In addition to managing and directing city staff, the city manager develops the annual operating and capital budgets, assists with policy development and represents the city on various community and regional boards.

== Parks ==
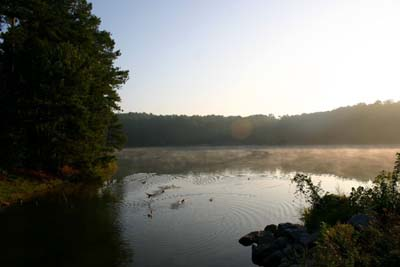
The lake at Murphey Candler Park

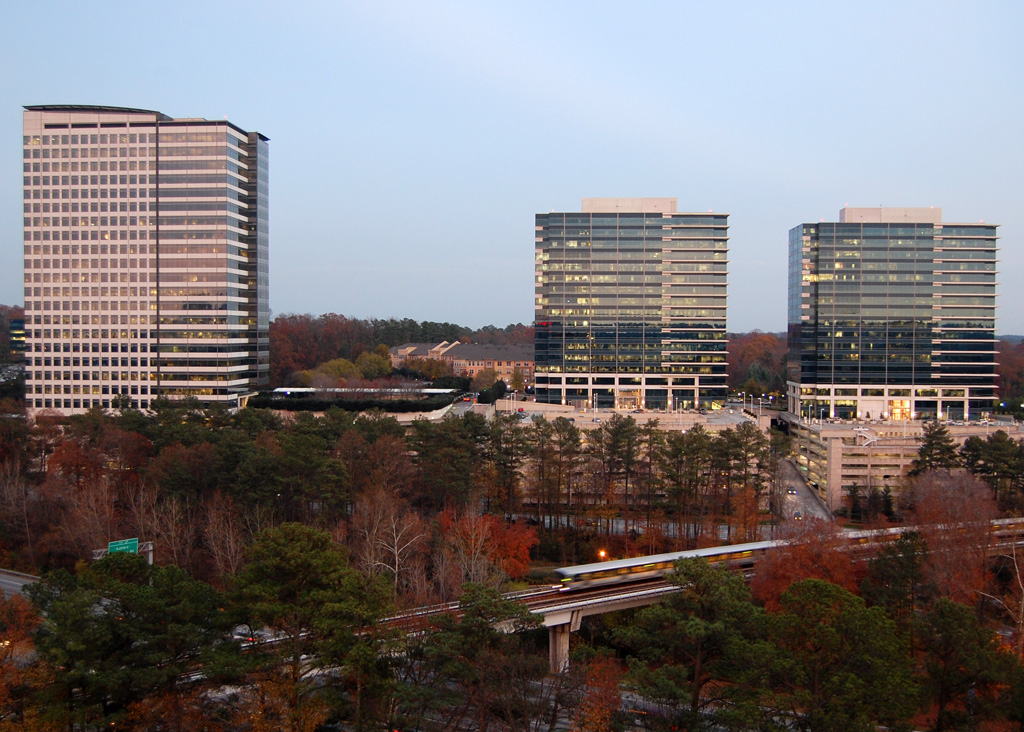
Skyscrapers in the Brookhaven portion of Perimeter Center

- Ashford Forest Preserve, 3890 Clairmont Rd. 33-acre. Greenspace preserve with a 1-mile trail.
- Ashford Park, 2980 Redding Rd. 3-acre (1.2 ha) Tennis courts, activity building, and multiple playgrounds.
- Blackburn Park, 3493 Ashford-Dunwoody Rd. Includes the Blackburn Tennis Center, this 49.5-acre (20.0 ha) park has tennis courts, full sized softball fields, picnic areas, large pavilion, and trails.
- Blackburn II Park, 3509 Blai Circle NE, Picnic table and walkway.
- Briarwood Park, 2235 Briarwood Way, 18-acre (7.3 ha) park with swimming pool, tennis courts, recreation center, playground, and trails
- Brookhaven Park, 4158 Peachtree Rd. 9-acre (3.6 ha) park with open use lawn area and trails.
- Clack's Corner, 1410 Cartecay Drive, 0.2-acre (0.081 ha).
- Fernwood Park, 1342 Sylvan Circle. Green space.
- Georgian Hills Park, 2800 Georgian Drive, 7-acre (2.8 ha).
- Langford Park, 1174 Pine Grove Ave NE, Atlanta, GA 30319. Green space with playground.
- Lynwood Park, 3360 Osborne Rd NE, (17 acres) park with recreation center, swimming pool, outdoor basketball & tennis courts, playground, multi-purpose field, and pavilions.
- Murphey Candler Park, 1551 W Nancy Creek Dr. 135-acre (55 ha) park featuring youth baseball, softball and football leagues, a 2-mile nature trail, picnic pavilions, a pool, and lake.
- North Druid Hills Greenspace, 1623 North Druid Hills Road
- Osborne Park, 3412 Osborne Road. Greenpace.
- Parkside Park, Dresden Drive, 2-acre (0.81 ha).
- Perimeter Trail at Murphy Candler, 1551 W Nancy Creek Drive. Trail and greenspace.
- Skyland Park, 2600 Skyland Dr., 11-acre (4.5 ha) park with open use lawn area, pavilion, and dog park for large and small dogs.
- Peachtree Creek Greenway, 2036 North Druid Hills Rd. Multi-use trail and greenspace.

== Transportation ==
=== Roads ===
- Ashford-Dunwoody Road. North-south access from Interstate 285.
- Peachtree Road. The main north–south road which is part of Georgia State Route 141 providing access from Atlanta and Chamblee.
- North Druid Hills Road. North-south access from Interstate 85.
- Buford Highway. North South access from Brookhaven to Buford, Ga. It is known for its multicultural shops and restaurants.

=== Interstates ===
- I-285 is a major interstate that circles the Metro Atlanta area and provides easy access the north border of Brookhaven.
- I-85 is a major interstate that passes through the south east border of Brookhaven.

=== Mass transit ===
The Metropolitan Atlanta Rapid Transit Authority(MARTA) provides heavy rail and bus service for Brookhaven, as well as the surrounding areas.

==== Heavy rail ====
- The Brookhaven/Oglethorpe MARTA is located in the heart of Brookhaven, serviced by the Gold Line.
- The northern part of the city limits are within walking distance of the Medical Center and Dunwoody Station, both of which are serviced by the Red Line.

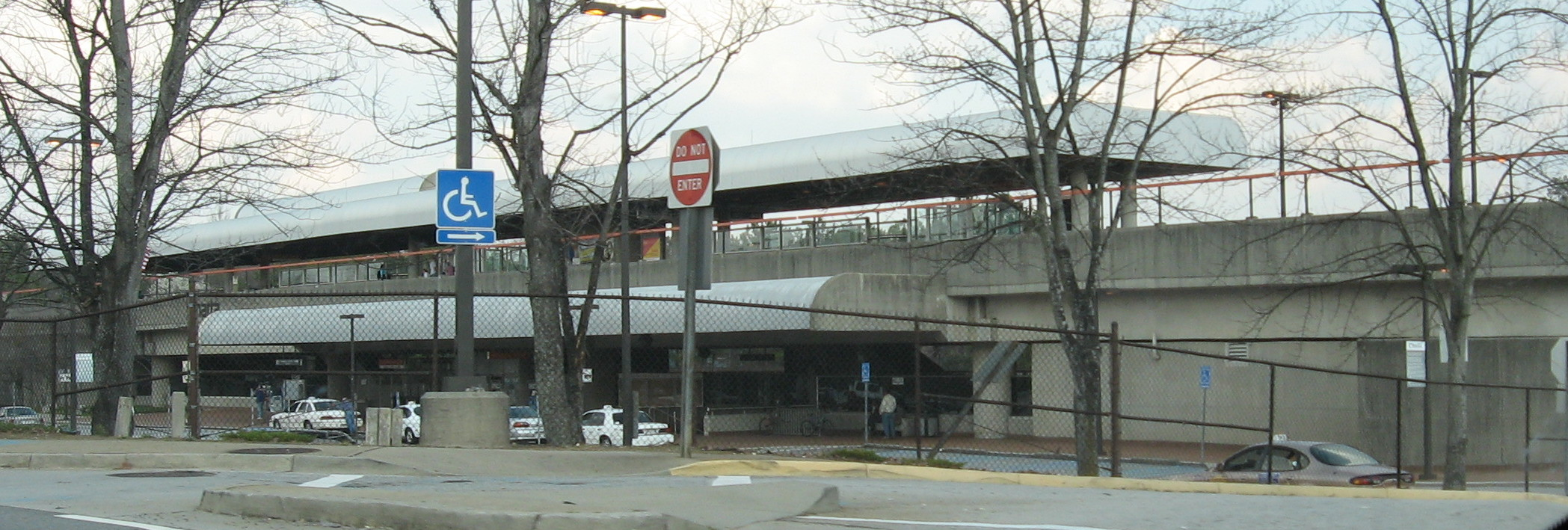
The Brookhaven/Oglethorpe MARTA Station

==== Buses ====
Both Brookhaven/Oglethorpe and Medical Center Stations have several bus routes that serve Brookhaven, including:

- Route 8 - North Druid Hills Rd.
- Route 25 - Peachtree Blvd.
- Route 39 - Buford Highway*
- Route 47 - I-85 Access Rd./Briarwood Rd.
- Route 110 - Peachtree Rd.
- Route 825 - Johnson Ferry Rd.

*Route 39 leaves from Lindbergh Center and Doraville Stations, but still serves the southern part of the city.

=== Pedestrians and cycling ===
In 2016 the City adopted the Bicycle, Pedestrian and Trail Plan that lists implementable policies and transportation projects aimed at accommodating all active transportation users.

On July 25, 2017, the City Council approved a new sidewalk and bike ordinance. The ordinance mandates for sidewalks on all new and improved local residential streets in Brookhaven. Bike lanes will also be required per the recommendations in Brookhaven's Bicycle, Pedestrian, & Trail Plan and other planning documents.

Additionally, on Tuesday, Oct.13, 2020 the Brookhaven City Council unanimously approved the Brookhaven Vulnerable Road User Ordinance that provides enhanced protections to non-vehicular users in the event of injury. Vulnerable road users are outlined in the ordinance as walkers, bike riders, strollers, and scooter riders, among others on the road not operating a motor vehicle. The ordinance makes a separate offense of driving a motor vehicle in such a way an injury is caused to a vulnerable road user.

Under the ordinance, drivers must maintain a safe distance of at least three feet from vulnerable road users to avoid a collision. The ordinance also states that a driver should yield the right of way to vulnerable road users when making a turn at an intersection and outlines safe ways of passing a vulnerable road user on the road. For their part, vulnerable road users should keep to the right of the lane except for when to avoid unsafe conditions. Cyclists must use a white light at the front of the bicycle during nighttime and should yield the right of way to pedestrians. This ordinance is part of Brookhaven's commitment to providing safe and appropriate access to pedestrians and users of alternative modes of transportation. Anyone in violation of this ordinance could receive up to a $500 fine for the first offense and up to a $1,000 fine, suspension of driving privileges and/or six months of incarceration for consecutive offenses.

==== Peachtree Creek Greenway ====
On June 29, 2017, Brookhaven Mayor John Ernst appointed members to the Peachtree Creek Steering Committee. The committee will provide critical oversight and guidance to the PATH Foundation as it completes engineering studies and prepares final construction of the Peachtree Creek Greenway.

Construction for Phase 1 of the Peachtree Creek Greenway was completed in late 2019 and celebrated its grand opening on Dec. 12, 2019. The Phase 1 of the multi-use trail provides resident access to bicycles and pedestrian trails and is 1.25 miles long stretching from North Druid Hills to Biarwood Road. Brookhaven's section of the Peachtree Creek Greenway is divided into three phases. When the construction for all three are completed, it will connect Brookhaven to unincorporated Dekalb and Atlanta.

The vision of the Peachtree Creek Greenway is to provide a transportation and recreational path that serves as a point of connectivity from the Atlanta Beltline to Doraville. The goal of the Greenway is to provide residents with easy access to bicycle and pedestrian trails, serve transportation and recreational needs, and help encourage quality of life and sustainable economic growth. When the entirety of the Peachtree Creek Greenway is completed it will be 12.3 miles long.

== Bibliography ==
- "National Register of Historic Places Inventory-Nomination Form", December, 1985. Historic Preservation Section, Georgia Department of Natural Resources and with the National Park Service, U.S. Department of the Interior, Washington, D.C.
- Brannen, Bettie. "Brookhaven History." 1991. Published in the "Neighborhood Directory," Brookhaven-Club Neighborhood Association, 1995.
- Maddox, Robert F. "History." published in "Governing Board; Constitution and Rules; Membership," Capital City Club, March 1992, p. 4.
