= Murphey Candler Park =

Park in Brookhaven, Georgia, United States

Coordinates: 33.91117°N 84.324532°W

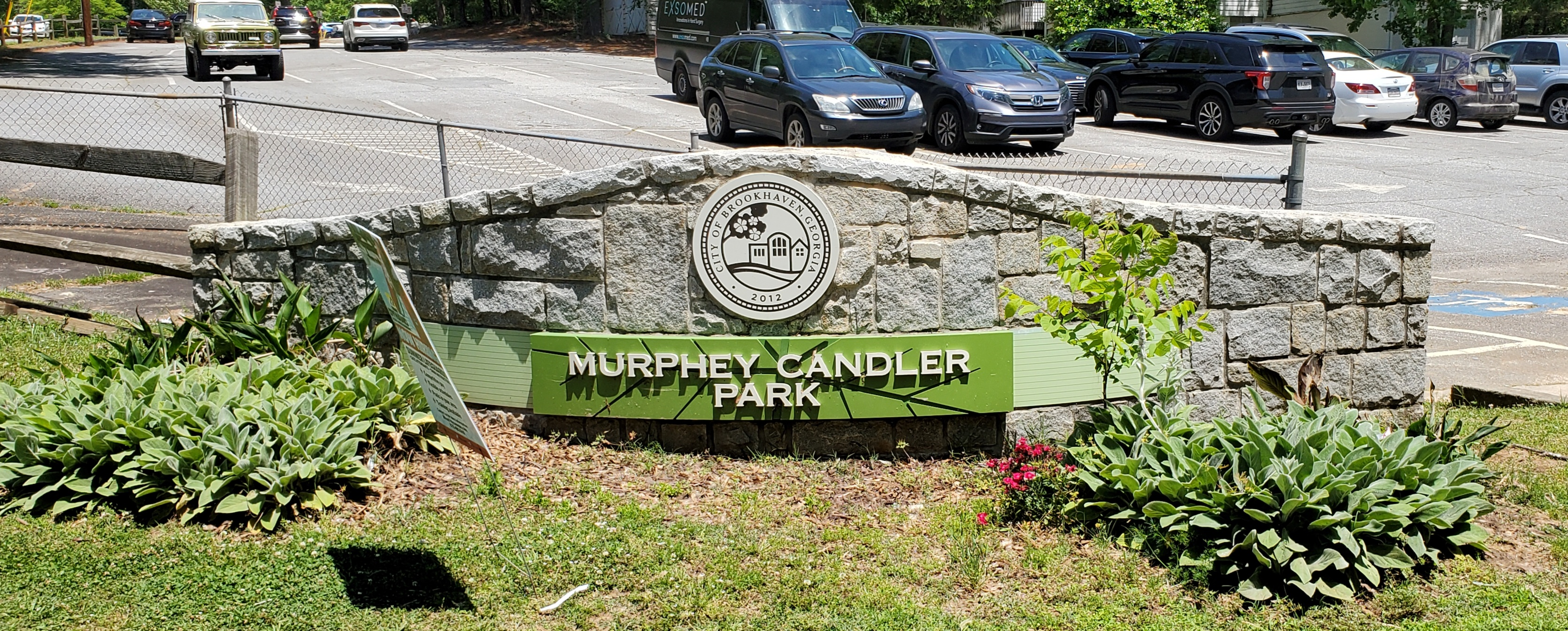
- Interactive map of Murphey Candler Park
- Type: Multi-use
- Location: 1551 West Nancy Creek Drive; Brookhaven, Georgia
- Area: 135 acres (55 ha)
- Created: 1954
- Open: All year

Murphey Candler Park is a 135-acre multi-use park located in Brookhaven, Georgia, United States. The park is owned and operated by the City of Brookhaven. Park amenities include multi-use fields, tennis courts, a swimming pool, a playground, picnic areas, a lake, and trails. Youth sports are offered through baseball, softball, and football programs that operate through the park. The lake at Murphey Candler Park offers fishing, and it is home to largemouth bass, bluegill, redear sunfish, and channel catfish. The lake is also home to Canada Geese, Mallards, other ducks and beavers.

== History ==
Murphey Candler Park was originally planned in 1950 with the prospective donation of 100 acres of land by Mr. Fred Wilson and 35 acres by Mr. & Mrs. M. A. Long. The idea of the park was championed by the North DeKalb Planning Council (formerly the Brookhaven Planning Council) with the support of many area civic/service groups and religious/fraternal organizations. In 1952, DeKalb County acquired the 135 acres of real estate located between Ashford Dunwoody Road and Chamblee Dunwoody Road with the intention to build a park for the communities of North DeKalb. The sole commissioner for DeKalb County (serving 1939-1955) at that time was Scott Candler. At the request of Fred Wilson, the park was named in honor of Mr. Candler’s late father, Charles Murphey Candler, a respected state Representative and state Senator, and good friend of Fred Wilson. On Sunday, January 31, 1954, a groundbreaking ceremony was held for Murphey Candler Park. Since no road existed at the time to the future park land, the ceremony was held at the point on Ashford Dunwoody Road where the park access road was to be built, now known as West Nancy Creek Drive. East Nancy Creek Drive and Candler Lake East were completed a short time later, giving people a way to get to the new park from either Chamblee Dunwoody or Ashford Dunwoody Roads. Right of way to the park from Ashford Dunwoody Road was granted by Jim Cowart Sr. with the understanding he would develop the land surrounding the park north of Nancy Creek. In the 1950s Murphey Candler Park was located in the City of North Atlanta. It was the only major park in the area servicing Brookhaven, Dunwoody, Chamblee and Doraville for decades. It still remains the largest park in all of North Dekalb.

== Murphey Candler Lake ==
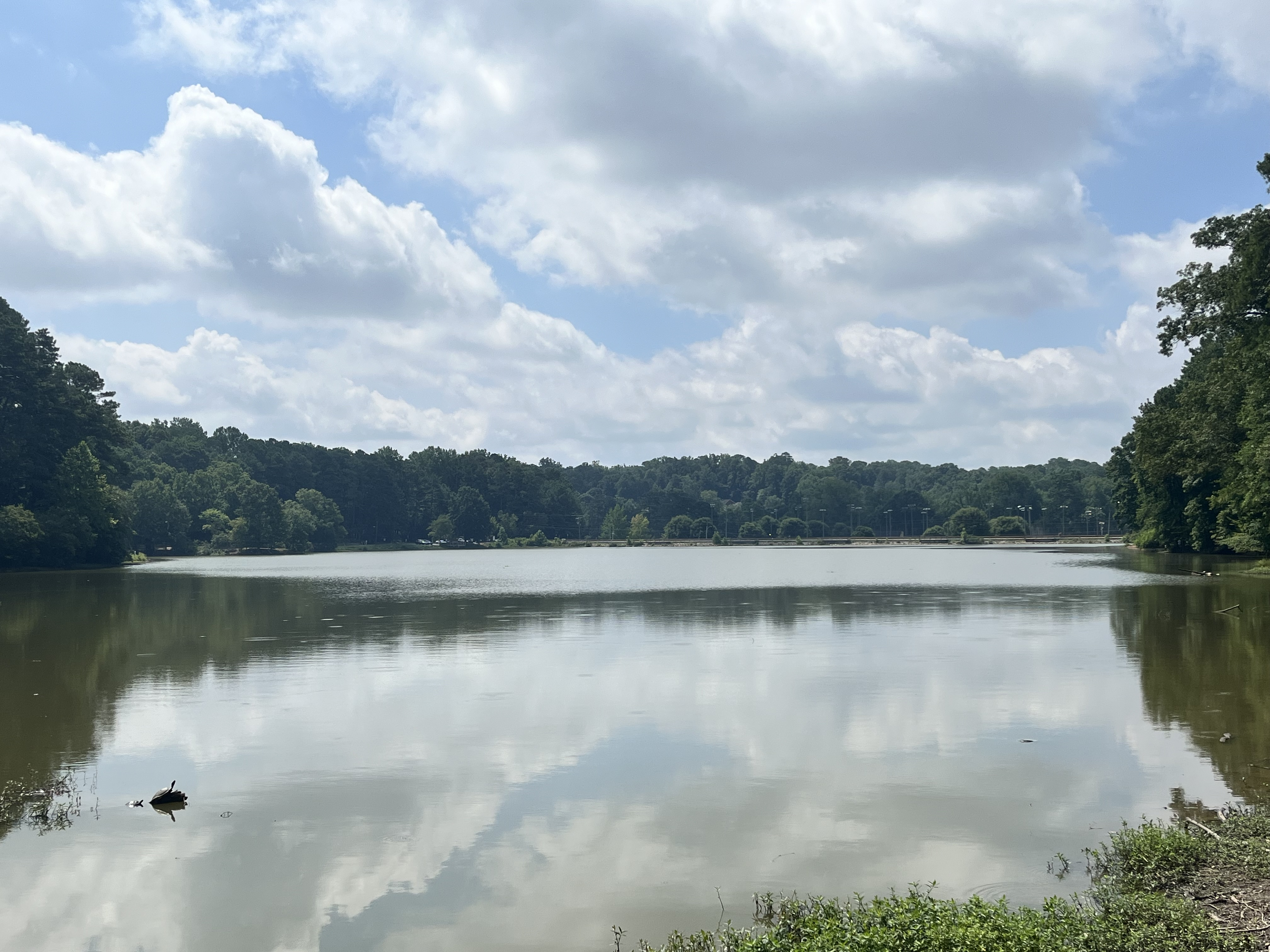
Murphey Candler Lake

A flash flood in the early 70s caused water to flow over the Murphey Candler lake dam and the dam began to leak. Fearing a dam failure, DeKalb county drained and dredged the lake to make repairs. The county required the newly constructed Perimeter Mall to redirect its water flow away from the lake. As part of the repairs, the lake's dam was widened and a flash flood prevention drain was installed to prevent flash floods down stream on Nancy Creek, the tributary Murphey Candler lake drains into.

In the early 1990s, due to massive construction north of the lake in Dunwoody, and due to the construction of interstate 285 the lake over flowed again from silt build up. The lake was drained again and was dredged in 1998 using a federal grant from the US Department of Transportation. The spillway was again modified, this time the spillway was widened to permit more water to flow downstream and the flash flood prevention pipe was filled with concrete in favor of a more attractive flow of water down the spillway.

After the flash flood prevention was removed and the Murphey Candler lake spillway was widened, the Ashford Dunwoody Road bridge downstream was damaged by a flash flood preventing passage by buses or fire trucks. A few years later in another flash flood the Peachtree Dunwoody Road bridge further downstream on Nancy Creek was washed out. A federal grant was required to repair and upgrade the Ashford Dunwoody Road bridge to withstand floods.

As of 2012 the lake has more than 6 feet of silt and no flash flood prevention other than the wood added to the guard rail on the dam to prevent cars from washing away.

== Youth sports ==
=== Football ===
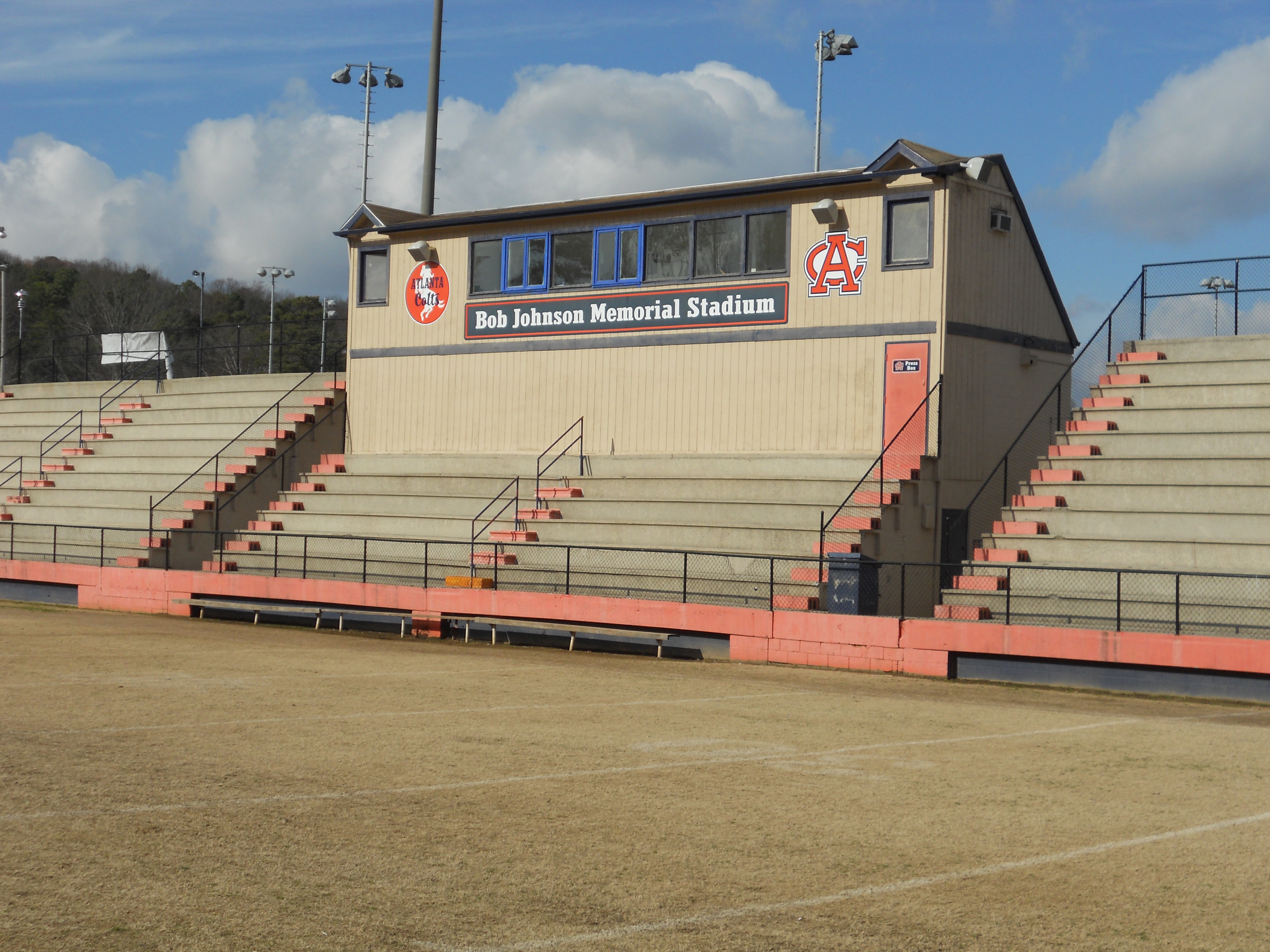
Bob Johnson Stadium at Colt Field, home of the Atlanta Colts, at Murphey Candler Park

Atlanta Colts Youth Association (ACYA) was established at Murphey Candler Park by Robert Johnson in 1965. While the Atlanta Colts were originally a Pop Warner franchise, it was discontinued in the 1990s. ACYA offers football programs for children in 1st through 7th grades, including traveling try-out teams (the Colts), interleague football, and flag football. Cheerleading is offered for girls in 1st through 7th grades. ACYA has won 121 league and bowl championships, and 9 national championships, since its founding.

=== Baseball ===
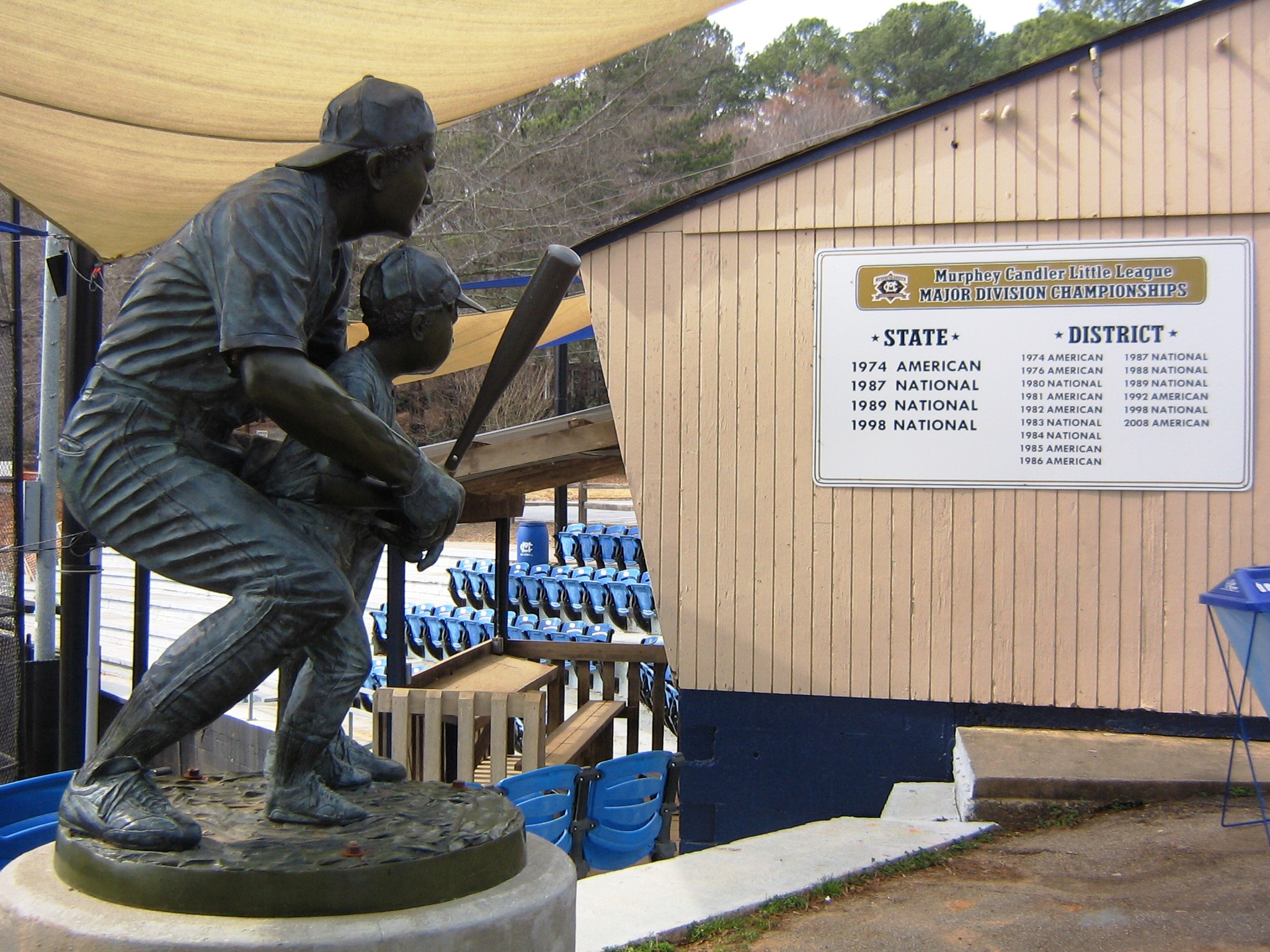
Baseball at Murphey Candler Park

Murphey Candler Baseball (MCB) is a non-profit, all-volunteer Dizzy Dean Baseball program for children aged 4–12 established in 1958. MCB establishes formal boundaries from which the program can draw players. The boundaries include most of northeast DeKalb County, Dunwoody, Chamblee, and Doraville, and parts of Tucker and Briarcliff. The boundaries also include Peachtree Corners in Gwinnett County and parts of Sandy Springs in Fulton County. Major Division tournament teams have won four state championships, twelve District 9 championships, and one 10-year-old state championship.

=== Softball ===
Murphey Candler Girls Fastpitch, known formally as Murphey Candler Girls Softball Association (MCGSA), provides a supervised girls' fastpitch softball program for girls aged 5–16. MCGSA offers traveling teams as well as t-ball. Founded in 1968, MCGSA was the first girls fastpitch softball program in Atlanta.

=== Swimming ===
Home of the Murphey Candler Swim Team and the birthplace of the Dynamos, Murphey Candler Pool was the only true 50 meter outdoor Olympic size pool in Georgia when it was built.

The Murphey Candler Swim team competed against local county swim teams from Briarwood Pool located in the Brookhaven community of Dekalb county and the swim team located at Chastain Park in Fulton county.

The Dynamo Swim Club accomplishments since the club`s inception in 1964 at Murphey Candler Pool have been extensive from winning state, regional and national team titles to setting national age group records to achieving American records and world ranked times, Dynamo swimmers have enjoyed success at every level of competitive swimming.

When Dekalb county let the Murphey Candler pool fall into disrepair, and modified the pool so that it was no longer an Olympic size, the Dynamos relocated to the 1996 Olympic training and swim center located in Chamblee, GA.

== Neighborhood ==
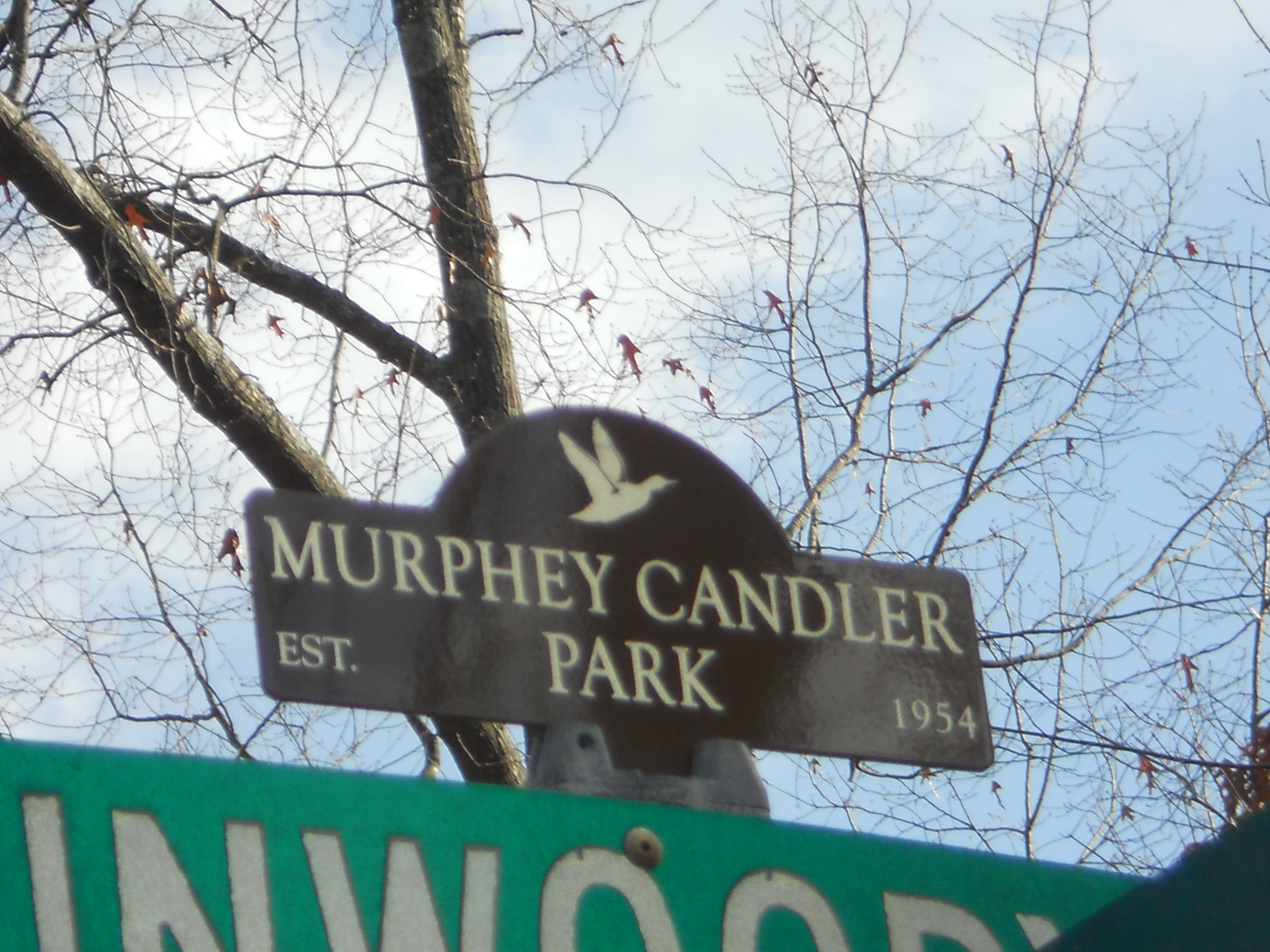
A Murphey Candler Park neighborhood sign

Murphey Candler Park is also the name of the residential neighborhood surrounding the park. The homes were built beginning in 1954, and continuing until around 1970. Most of the homes are two-story traditionals or ranches.
