= Historic Brookhaven =

- Brookhaven Historic District
- U.S. National Register of Historic Places
- U.S. Historic district
- Location: E of Peachtree-Dunwoody and N and E of Peachtree Rds; Atlanta, Georgia
- Coordinates: 33°51′33″N 84°20′20″W
- Built: 1911
- Architectural style: Late 19th And Early 20th Century Revivals
- NRHP reference No.: 86000134
- Added to NRHP: January 1, 1986

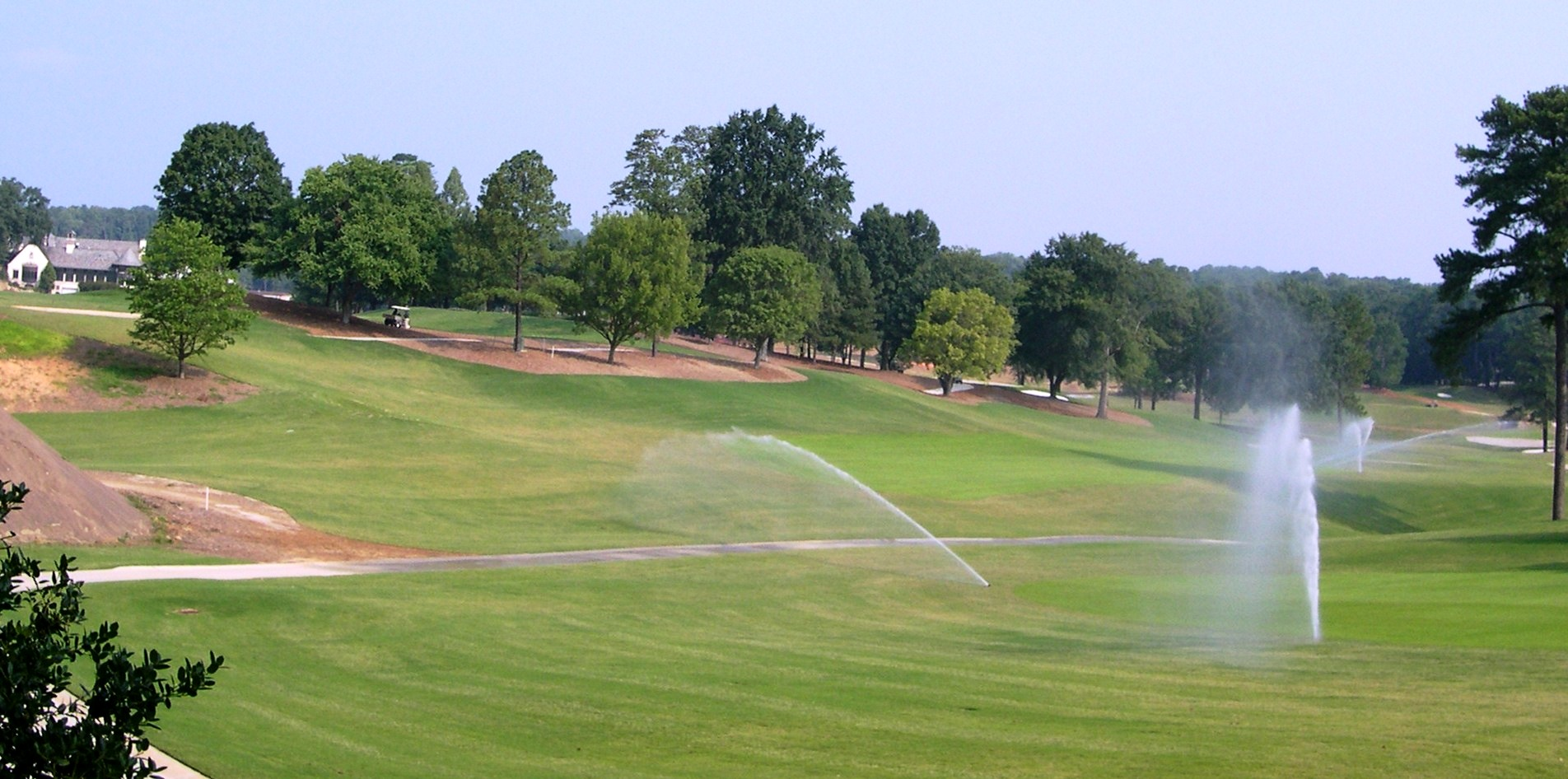
Capital City Club Golf Course

Historic Brookhaven is a historic neighborhood in the Atlanta metropolitan area of the U.S. state of Georgia, part of which lies in the Buckhead district of Atlanta, part of which lies in Sandy Springs, and part of which lies in city of Brookhaven, to which it lends its name. Capital City Club country club is at the center of the neighborhood, and it is surrounded by valuable homes, many of which were designed by a number of well-known Atlanta architects of the pre-war period. The neighborhood boundaries are well defined, and it stretches from Peachtree Dunwoody Road to the west, Windsor Parkway to the north, Mabry Drive to the east, and Peachtree Road to the south.

Historic Brookhaven has perpetually been one of metropolitan Atlanta's wealthiest neighborhoods. As of 2010, it has a median household income of $236,393.
