= Edwin P. Ansley =

American real estate developer

Edwin Percival Ansley (March 30, 1865, in Augusta, Georgia – July 2, 1923, in Atlanta) was a real estate developer in Atlanta.

== Career ==
In 1902, Ansley developed Atlanta's first suburb designed specifically for automobiles, Ansley Park, and also built the Hotel Ansley in the Fairlie-Poplar district of Downtown Atlanta. In 1898, he secured the railway right of way from Howell Station to Mitchell Street in Downtown Atlanta, a line which the Atlanta, Birmingham and Atlantic Railway would later take over.

In 1914 Ansley developed Oglethorpe Park subdivision in today's Brookhaven, between the Capital City Club (of which Ansley was a member) and Oglethorpe University.

== Death ==
Ansley was buried in Oakland Cemetery in Atlanta.
