= Town Brookhaven =

Mixed-use development in Georgia, United States

Coordinates: 33°52′13″N 84°20′11″W

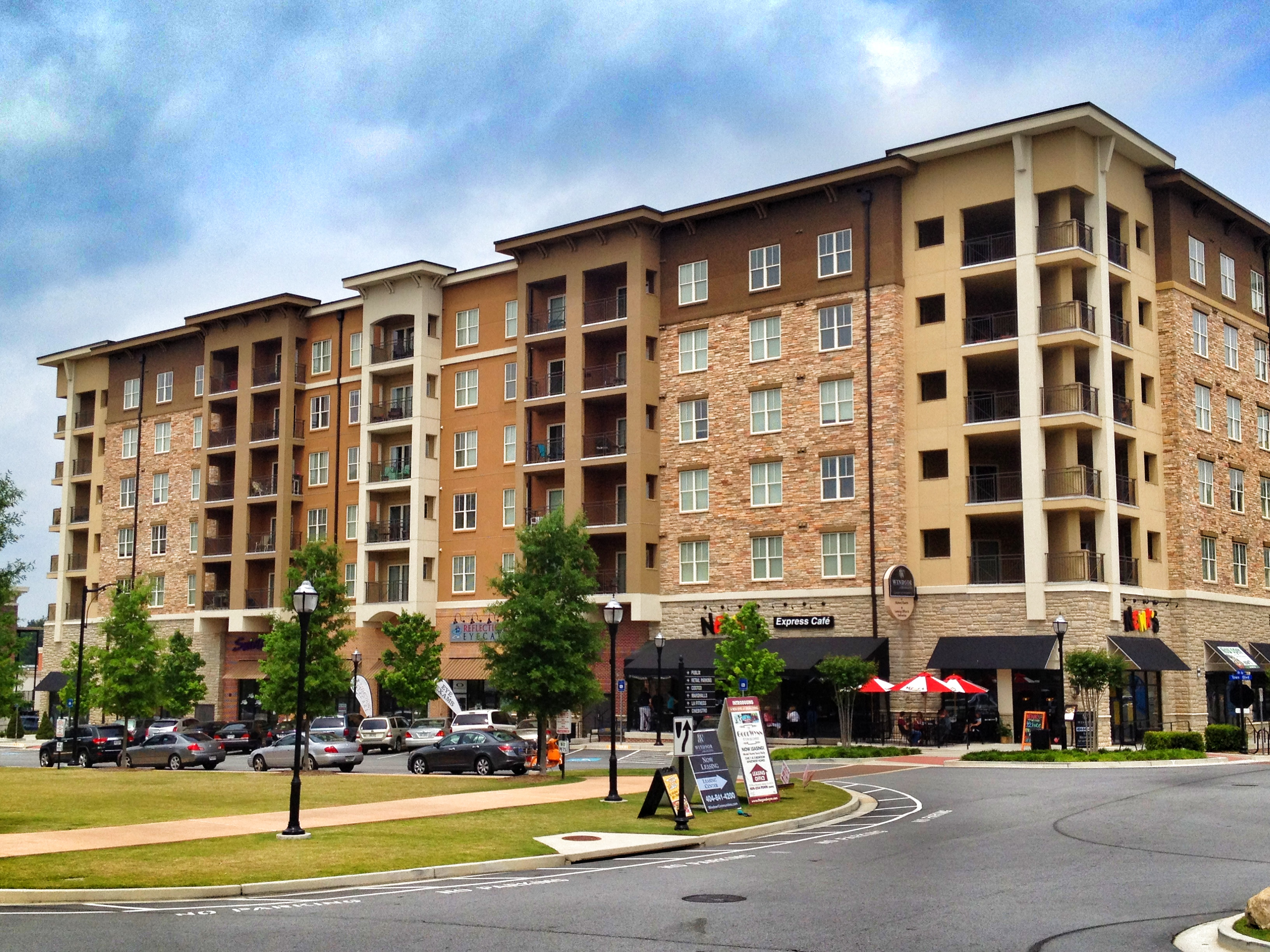
Residential/retail building at Town Brookhaven

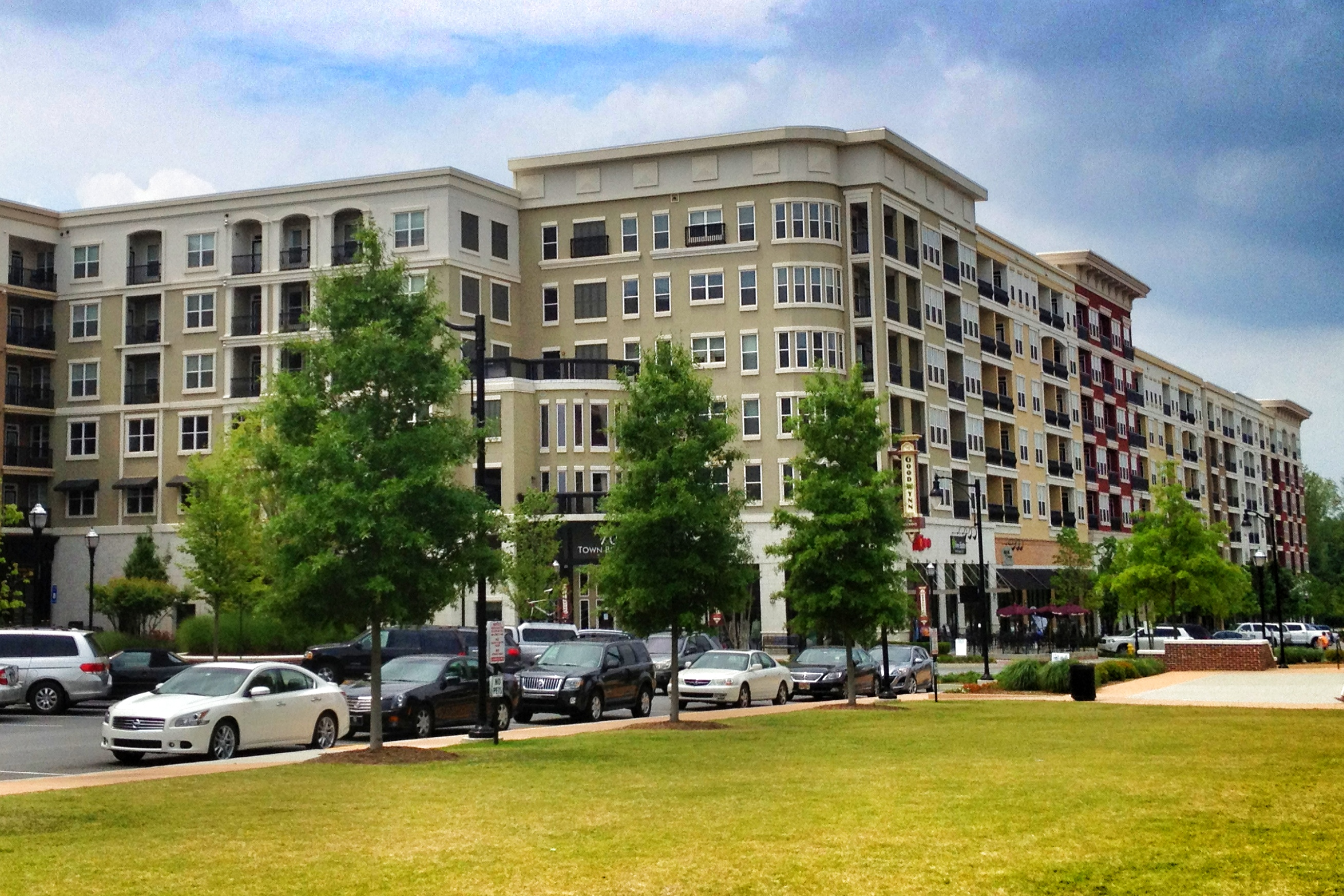
Residential/retail building at Town Brookhaven

Town Brookhaven is a 600,000-square-foot (56,000 m^{2}) mixed-use district developed by the Sembler Company, located on a 54-acre site at Peachtree Road and Town Boulevard (formerly Cross Keys Drive) in Brookhaven, Georgia, adjacent to Oglethorpe University. Major commercial tenants include Cobb Theatres Cine'bistro (a luxury dinner-and-a-movie theatre), Costco, Marshalls, an LA Fitness gym, and a Publix supermarket. In addition, there are more than 1,500 residential units and 150,000 square feet (14,000 m^{2}) of office space in the complex.
