= Goodwin House (Brookhaven, Georgia) =

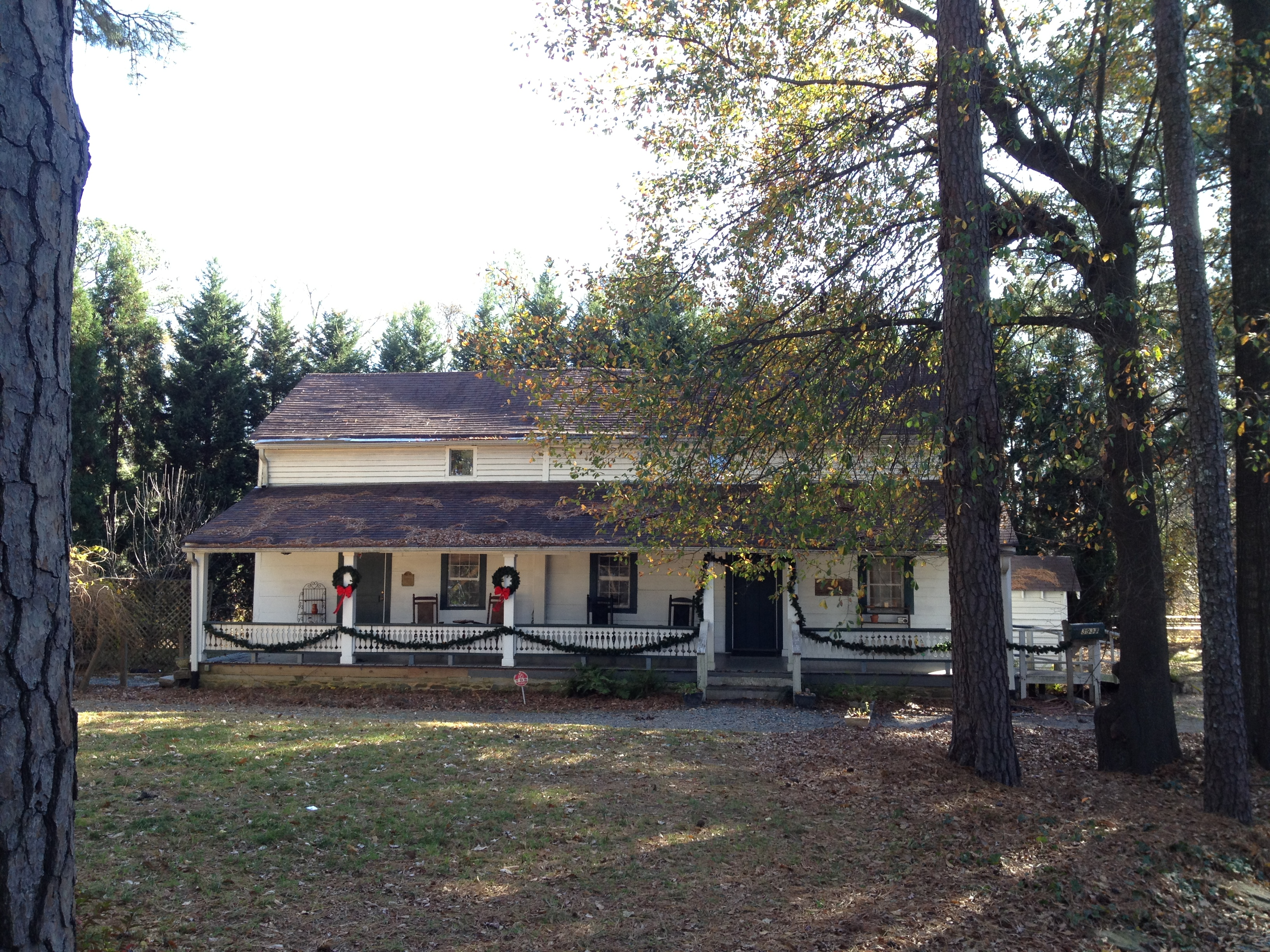
- Goodwin House

- Location within Georgia Location within the United States
- Alternative names: Solomon Goodwin House, Goodwin's

General information
- Coordinates: 33.857758°N 84.34247°W
- Completed: 1831

Website
- goodwinhistory.org

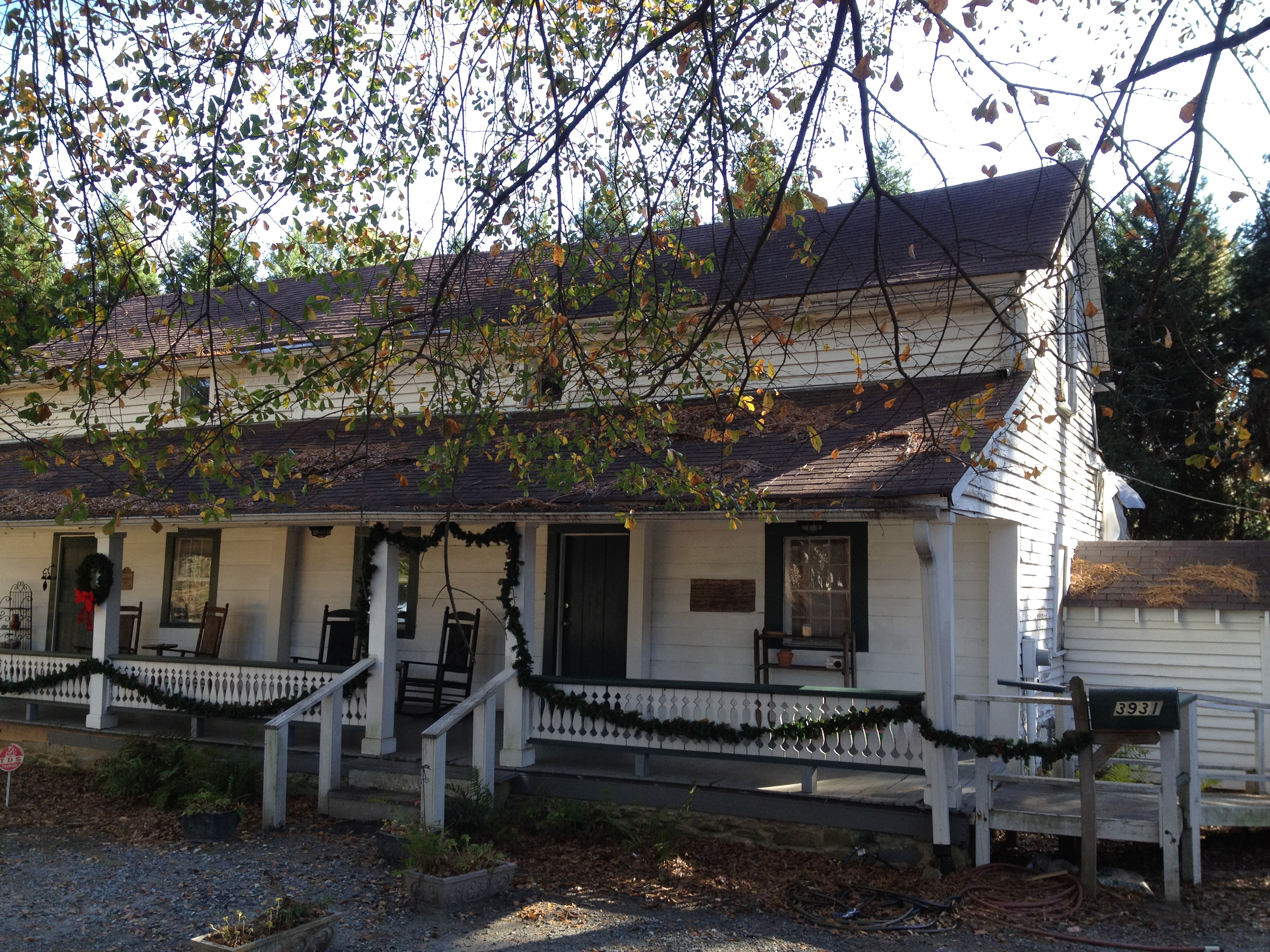
Goodwin House

The Solomon Goodwin House was located at 3931 Peachtree Road in Brookhaven, Georgia, 0.5 miles (0.80 km) east of Atlanta city limits. Dating back to 1831, it was the oldest building still standing in DeKalb County, Georgia and the oldest building "Inside the Perimeter". The home once headed up a 600-acre (240 ha) farm.

The area's first white settler was Harris Goodwin, a South Carolinian who homesteaded a tract on both sides of what is now Peachtree Road in the early 1830s. Harris Goodwin later brought his father, Solomon (d. 1850), to the area. In addition to the home, a small graveyard in which they are buried is located at the site.

It was built in 1831 as a log cabin. Between 1839 and 1842, the family built around the cabin, transforming the structure into a Plantation Plain-style home similar to the Tullie Smith House now located at the Atlanta History Center.

"Goodwin's" was a scheduled stop on the Atlanta and Charlotte Air Line Railway, later the Southern Railway trains traveling between Atlanta and points northeast.

In October 2011, the owners of the house, the Martin sisters, great-great-great-great granddaughters of Solomon Goodwin, offered the house free of charge to anyone who would relocate it and maintain it.

In 2016, the house was dismantled and relocated to an unnamed site.
