= Capital City Club =

- U.S. National Register of Historic Places
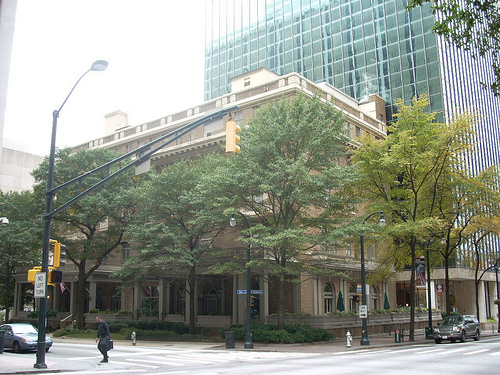
- Capital City Club (2009)

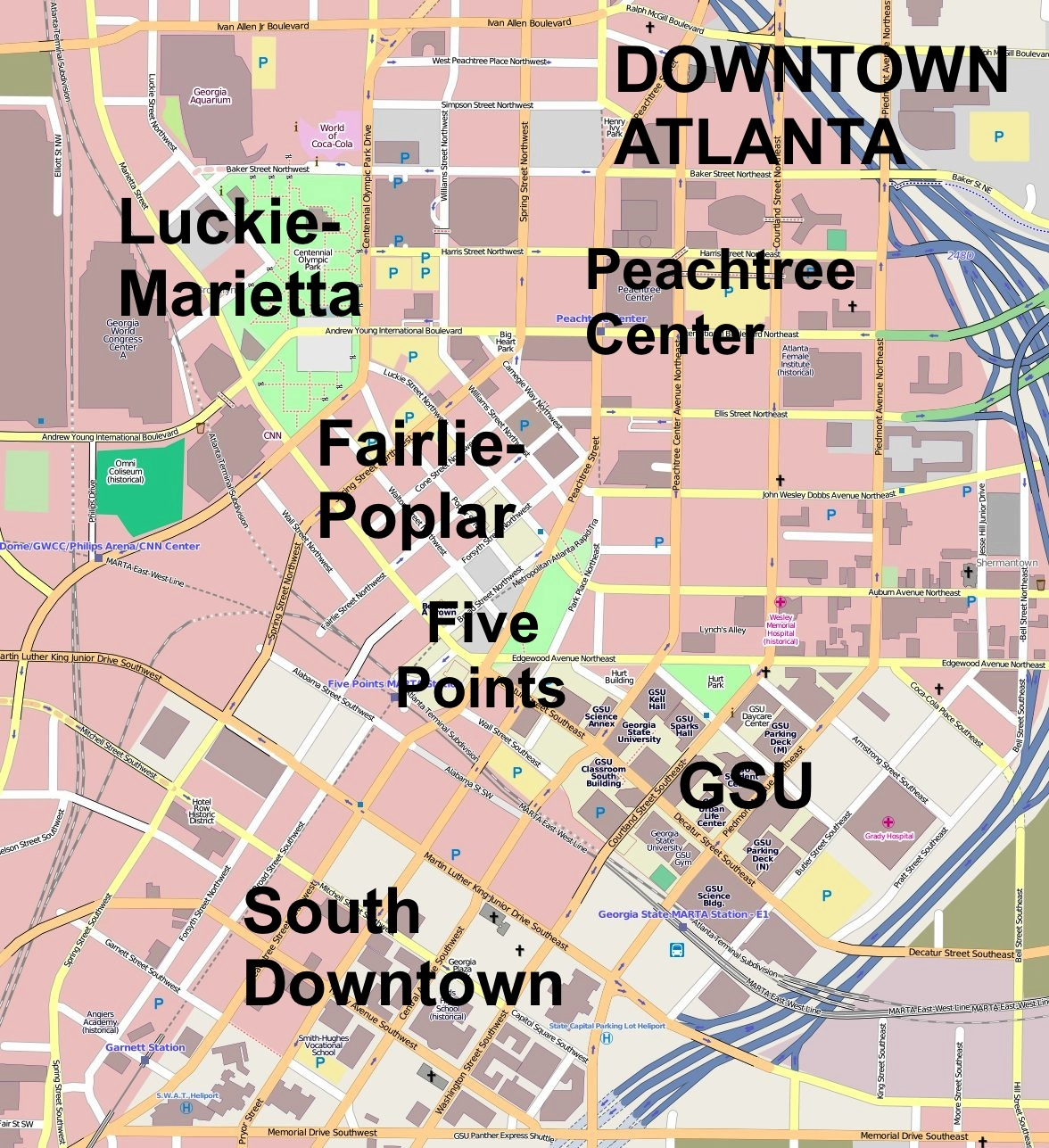
- Location within Downtown Atlanta
- Location: 7 John Portman Blvd, NW, Atlanta, Georgia
- Coordinates: 33.761242°N 84.388077°W
- Area: less than one acre
- Built: 1911/1883
- Architect: Barber, Don; Marye, P. Thornton
- Architectural style: Colonial Revival, Georgian Revival, French Provincial
- NRHP reference No.: 77000425
- Added to NRHP: September 15, 1977

The Capital City Club is a private social club located in Atlanta, Georgia. Chartered on May 21, 1883, it is one of the oldest private clubs in the South.

== History ==
According to its charter, the purpose of the club is "to promote the pleasure, kind feeling and general culture of its members." Harry C. Stockdell was the club's first president. He was succeeded in 1884 by Robert J. Lowry; and in 1885 Livingston Mims began the longest term as president, serving, with a two-year interruption, from 1886 through 1906. Subsequent presidents have all served two years or less.

The first club house was located at 43 Walton Street. In August 1884, the club moved to a new establishment at 114 Peachtree Street. The Club presently operates three facilities for the use of its members, the oldest of which, the downtown Atlanta club building on John Portman Blvd., was dedicated on December 16, 1911. Herbert Barker was the original architect of the golf course, which was completed in 1911. The Capital City Country Club, located in Brookhaven, was leased in 1913 and purchased in 1915. At that time the golf course was increased from nine to eighteen holes. The present country club building was erected in 1928. In the autumn of 2002 an additional club facility, the Crabapple Golf Club, was completed on 600 acres (2.4 km^{2}) in Milton, Georgia, which is in the northern portion of Fulton County.

Notable individuals, including several presidents of the United States and royalty from other nations, have been guests at the Capital City Club.

== Architecture ==
The downtown Atlanta Capital City Club was designed by Beaux-Arts-trained architect Donn Barber in "the dignified and rather severe mode that characterizes prestigious New York City clubs such as the Colony Club (McKim, Mead & White, 1906)." Georgian Revival in its textures and motifs, the building was originally four-stories with a fifth floor being added above the dentiled cornice later in its history.

Their Capital City Country Club (1928) designed by Burge and Stevens, survives in Historic Brookhaven and "presents a picturesque, rambling, manorial image." "Tall chimneys, the cylindrical stair tower with [its] conical roof", and "[its] obliquely projecting gabled wings" create an "irregular silhouette of French provincial forms".

== Notable members ==
Notable members of Capital City Club include:

- Asa Griggs Candler, Founder of The Coca-Cola Company
- Robert W. Woodruff, President of The Coca-Cola Company from 1923 until 1954
- Edwin P. Ansley, Atlanta real estate developer in the early 20th century
- Charles A. Collier, president of the Cotton States and International Exposition (1895)
- Joel Hurt, founder of the Trust Company of Georgia
- Joseph E. Brown, Civil War Governor of Georgia
- Alexander C. King and Jack Spalding, co-founders of American law firm King & Spalding
- John C. Portman, Jr., American architect and real estate developer
- William B. Hartsfield, mayor of Atlanta
- Alfred W. Jones, developer of Sea Island, Georgia
- Robert A. Toombs, Secretary of State of the Confederate States of America
- Henry W. Grady, New South advocate and editor of The Atlanta Constitution
- Robert Tyre "Bobby" Jones Jr., only winner of the Grand Slam of golf, founder of Augusta National Golf Club and the Masters Tournament
- Oliver Clyde Fuller, Fuller and Son, Wholesale Grocers during reconstruction Atlanta, GA. Later banker and president of First Wisconsin National Bank, which eventually became U.S. Bancorp.

== See also ==
- List of American gentlemen's clubs
- National Register of Historic Places listings in Fulton County, Georgia
