= Hotel Ansley =

Hotel in Atlanta, Georgia, United States

Coordinates: 33.7574°N 84.3889°W

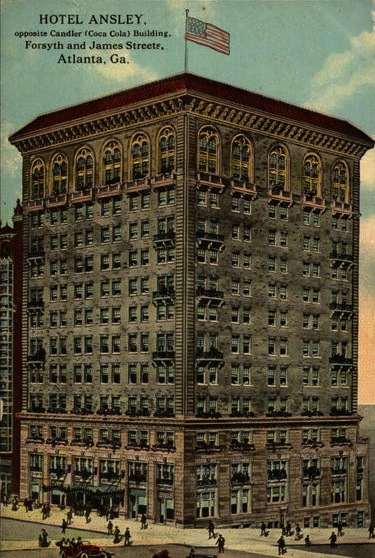
Postcard view of Hotel Ansley, 1912

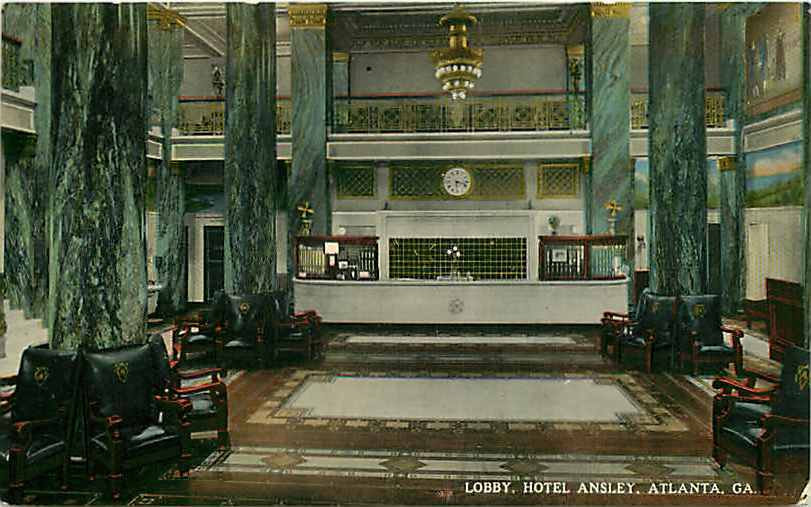
Hotel lobby, 1910s

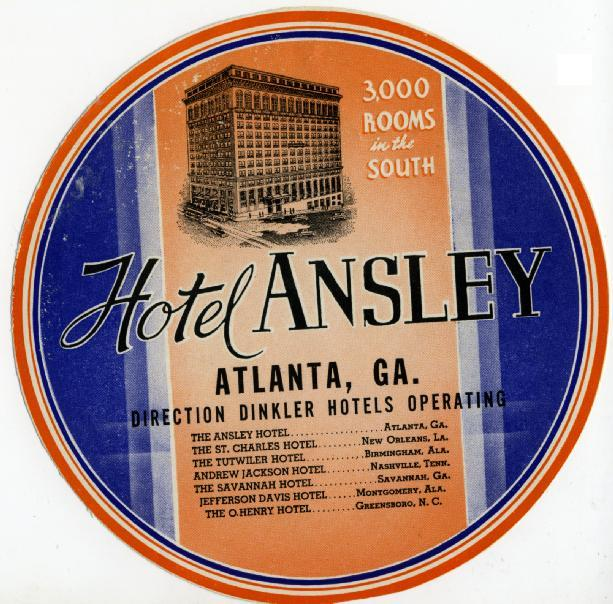
Luggage label

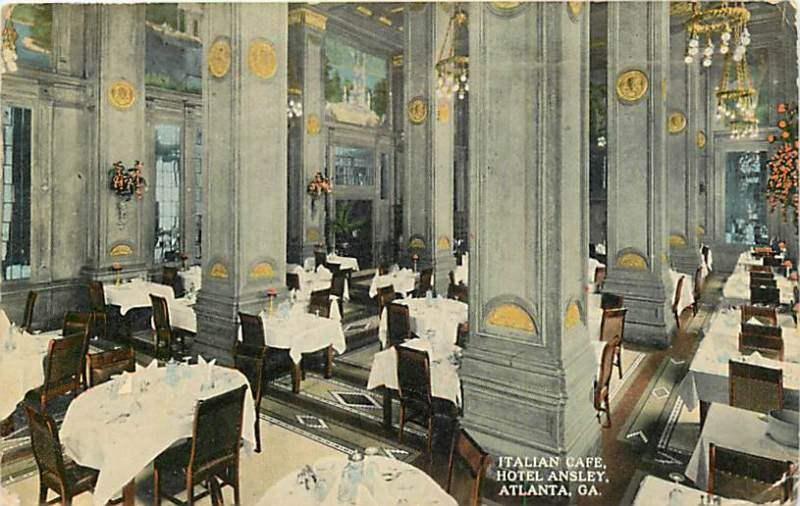
Italian café at the hotel

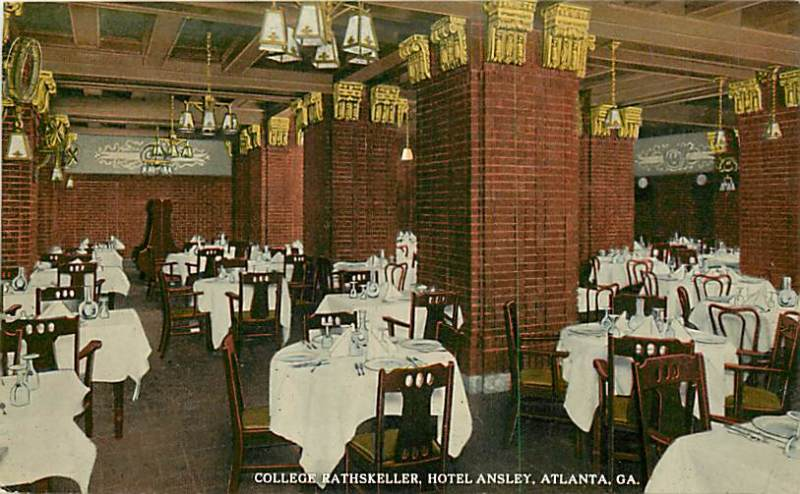
College Rathskeller restaurant at the hotel

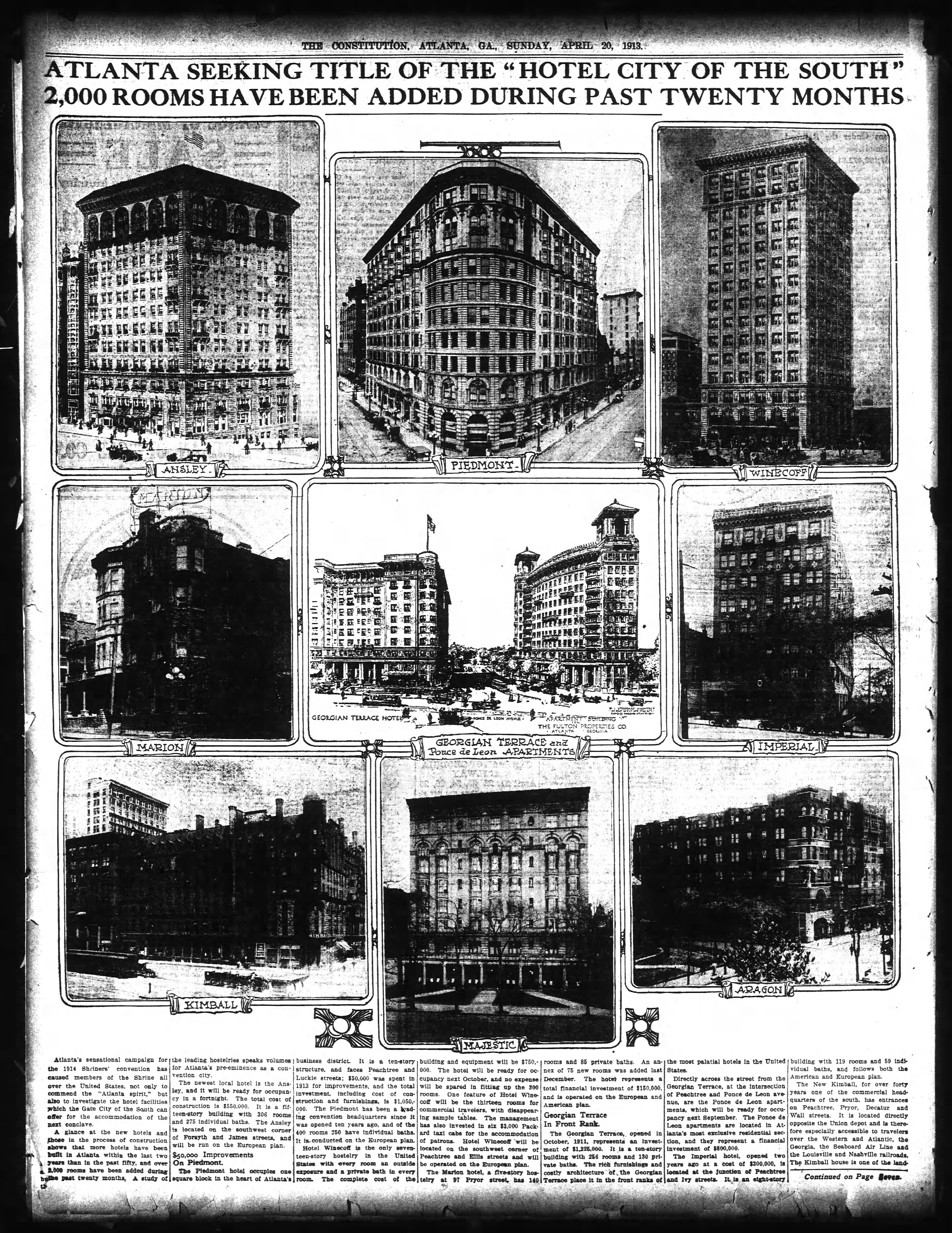
Ansley featured in article from Atlanta Constitution of April 20, 1913 about city's hotels

The Hotel Ansley was a hotel that occupied the south side of Williams Street between Forsyth and Fairlie streets in the Fairlie-Poplar district of Downtown Atlanta. It was built in 1913 by Jerome B. Pound, publisher of the Chattanooga News in Chattanooga, Tennessee, and named for Edwin P. Ansley, developer of the Ansley Park neighborhood; an estimated 5,000 guests attended the opening of the $1,000,000 property. The property was originally managed by M. I. and Frank Harrell.

In 1930 radio station WGST moved its studios to the hotel.

By 1931, advertisements for the hotel described it as having 400 rooms and 400 baths, with a radio in every room.

In 1952 the property was sold to the Dinkler hotel chain and was renamed the Dinkler Ansley; it was renamed again in 1953 as the Dinkler Plaza Hotel. In 1962, the Dinkler Plaza Hotel refused a room to Under-Secretary-General for the United Nations and Nobel Peace Prize laureate Dr. Ralph Bunche because he was Black. On January 27, 1965, while operating as the Dinkler Plaza Hotel, the building hosted an interracial banquet honoring Martin Luther King Jr. after his 1964 Nobel Peace Prize.

The hotel was razed in 1972.

== See also ==
- Hotels in Atlanta
