= Wellington Building =

Building in Ottawa, Canada

Coordinates: 45.421725°N 75.700951°W

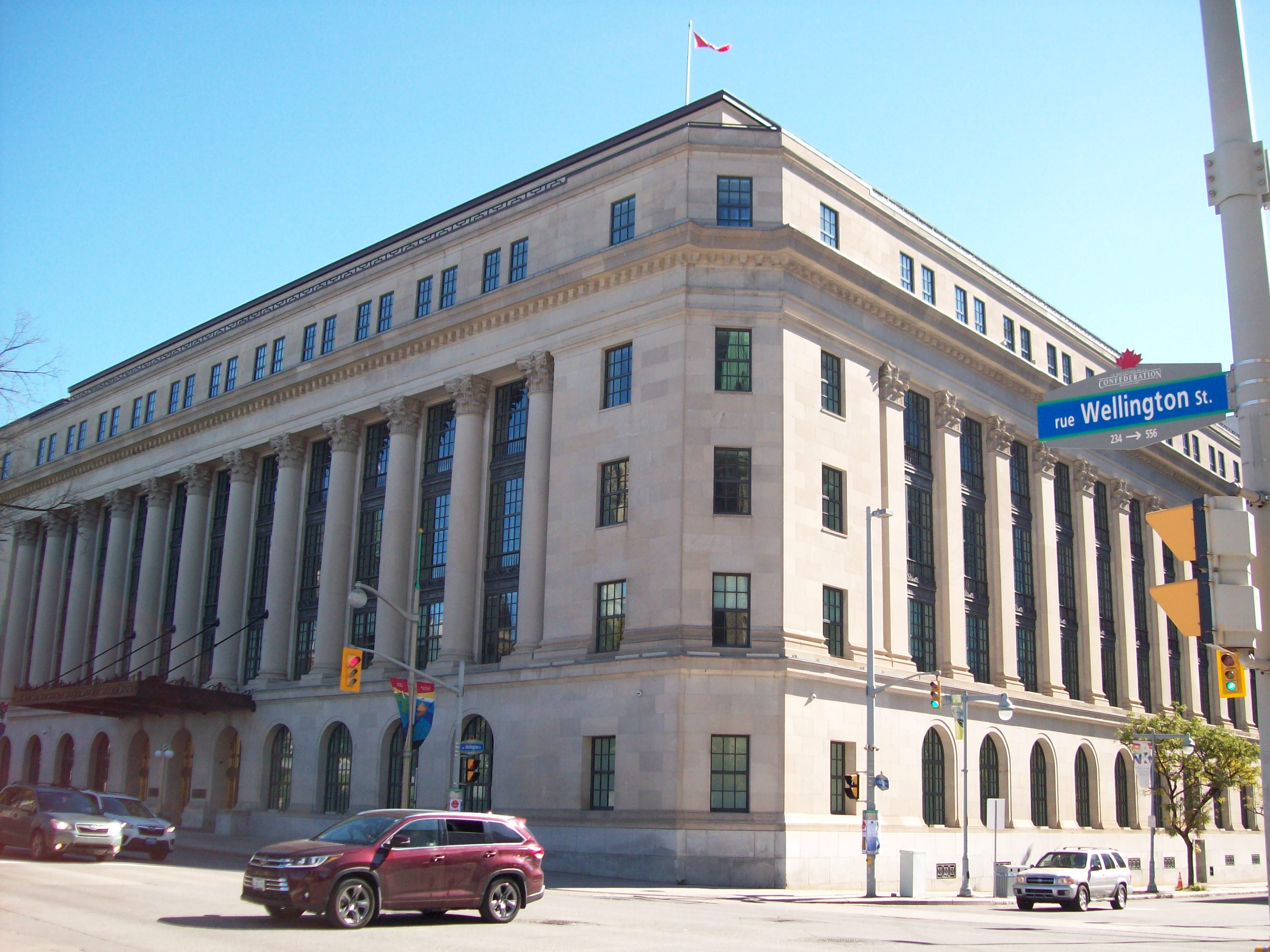
- Wellington Building as seen in 2020
- Former names: Metropolitan Life Insurance Building

General information
- Status: Completed
- Architectural style: Beaux Arts
- Location: 180 Wellington Street, Ottawa, Ontario, Canada
- Year built: 1924–1927, 1957–58, 1958–59
- Renovated: 2010–2016
- Client: Metropolitan Life Insurance Company (of New York, New York)

Height
- Architectural: Monumental dressed stone building with Corinthian columns facing Wellington Street
- Top floor: 6

Design and construction
- Architect: D. Everett Waid

The Wellington Building is a Beaux-Arts style office building in Ottawa, Ontario, Canada. It was built between 1925 and 1927 as Canadian headquarters of the Metropolitan Life Insurance Company. The original structure was designed by D. Everett Waid; in 1959, the more restrained east wing of the building was added.

The Building is located just south of the Parliament buildings at the intersection of Wellington Street and Bank Street with its southern face on Sparks Street. It remained the home of Met Life until 1970 when the company moved to a new building to the south. It was bought by the federal government, and used as offices and for a time the home of the Canadian Postal Museum. In 1984, a shortage of office space for the MPs resulted in some of them being moved to the building. This was the first time MPs had been housed outside of Parliament Hill.

Since its rehabilitation in 2016, the building is occupied by the House of Commons and serves several parliamentary functions.

== Heritage value ==
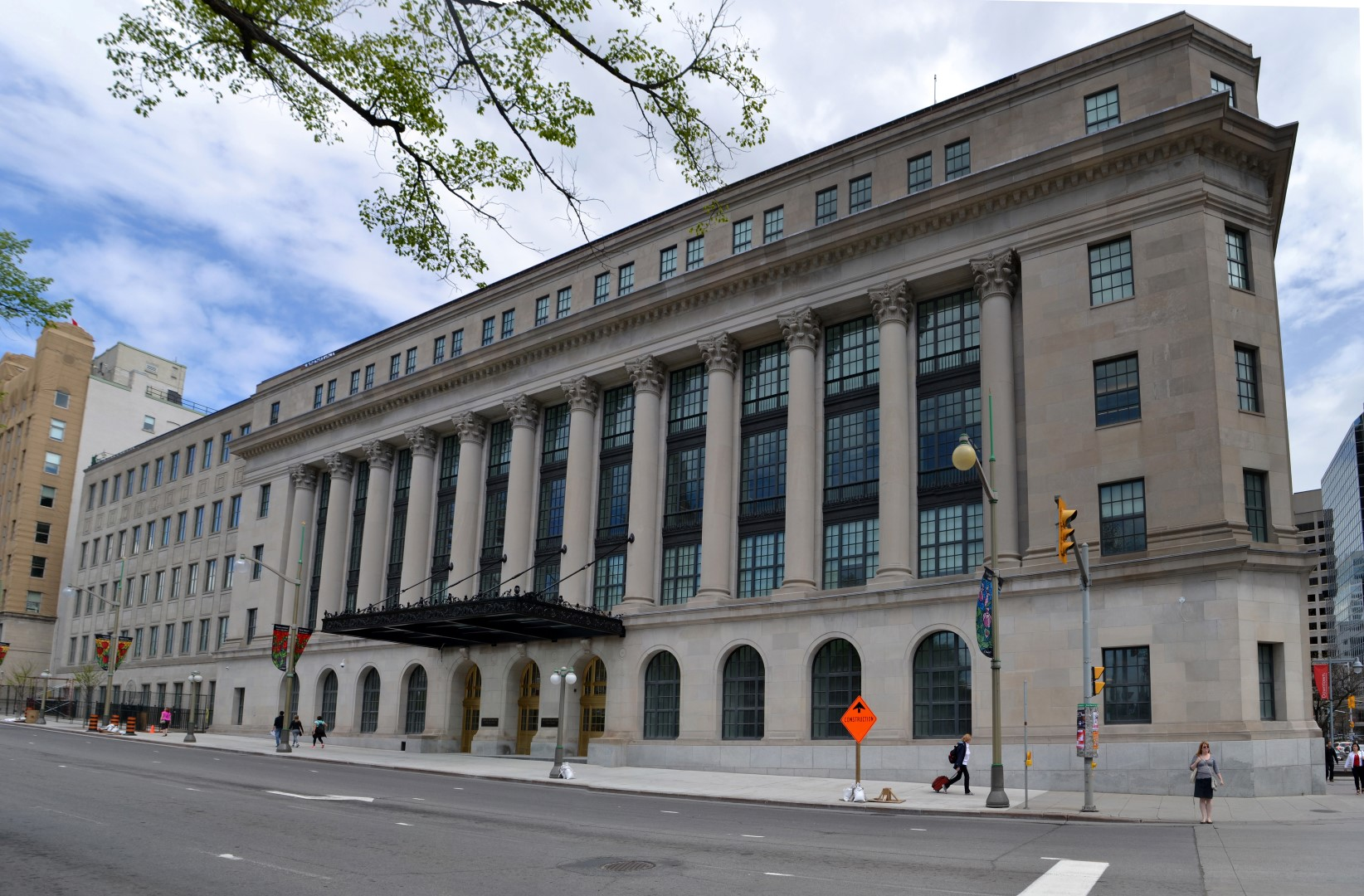
Wellington Building showing the two-storey addition to the top of the original building (1957–58) and the added six-storey wing shown at left (1958–59)

The Wellington Building (formerly the Metropolitan Life Assurance Building) was built in 1925–27 to designs by D. Everett Waid, architect, of New York; J.A. Ewart, Ottawa, associated architect. In 1957–58 two storeys were added to the original building, and in 1958–59 a six-storey wing was added to the east, both to designs by Marani and Morris, architects, Toronto. Public Works Canada is now the custodian of the building.

In January, 1987, the building was designated Recognized by Canada's Federal Heritage Buildings Review Office because of its sophisticated Beaux Arts design and its environmental importance. It is valuable both for its strong contribution to the formality of Wellington Street opposite Parliament, and for the sensitivity to the modest commercial proportions of Sparks Street visible in its "back" façade. Historically, the building there of the Canadian headquarters of a large American firm coincides with the emergence of Ottawa as a regional commercial centre. The building was a deliberate example of advanced thinking concerning efficient office planning for clerical "factories" and a concern for health in the workplace.

== 2010–2016 rehabilitation ==
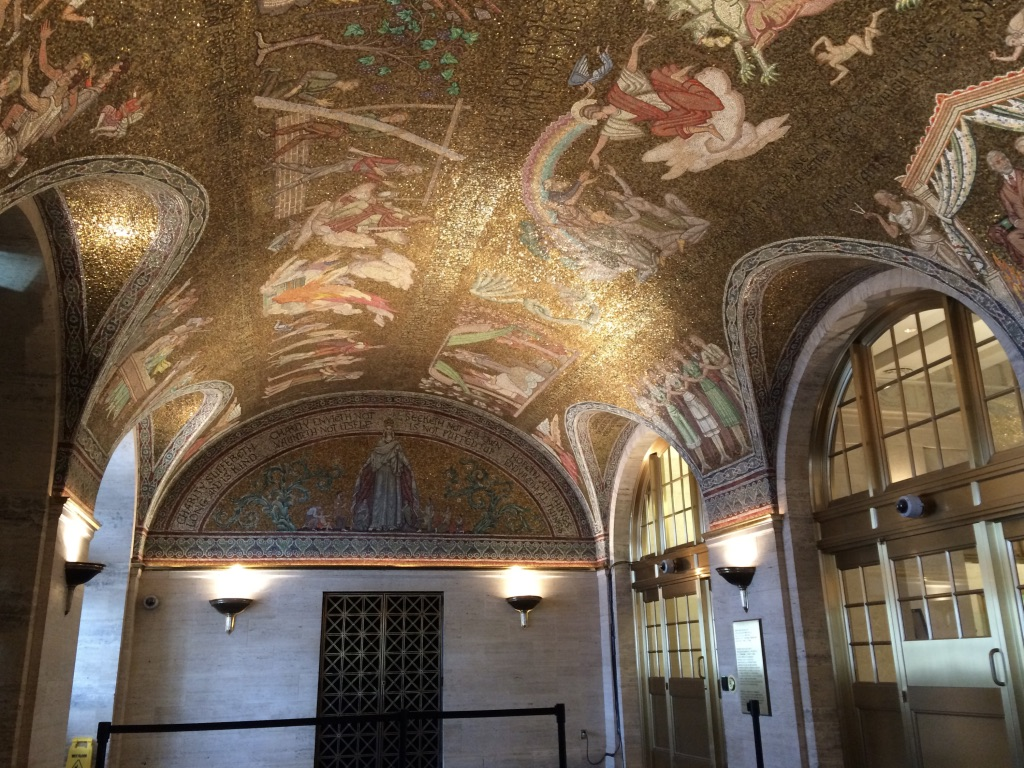
Byzantine-style mosaic vestibule

In 2010, the building was closed for extensive rehabilitation work, which included asbestos abatement, seismic reinforcement, reduction in energy use by 25%, and the modernization of its interior spaces and systems to accommodate MP Offices, committee rooms and a library.

Historic preservation work included the conservation and restoration of the building's significant heritage features, such as the valuable Byzantine-style mosaic in its vestibule, and the decorative steel and glass canopy on Wellington Street whose original was removed in the 1960s.

Work was completed in the spring of 2016.
