= Greenwich Library =

Public library in Greenwich, CT

Coordinates: 41.0289°N 73.6295°W

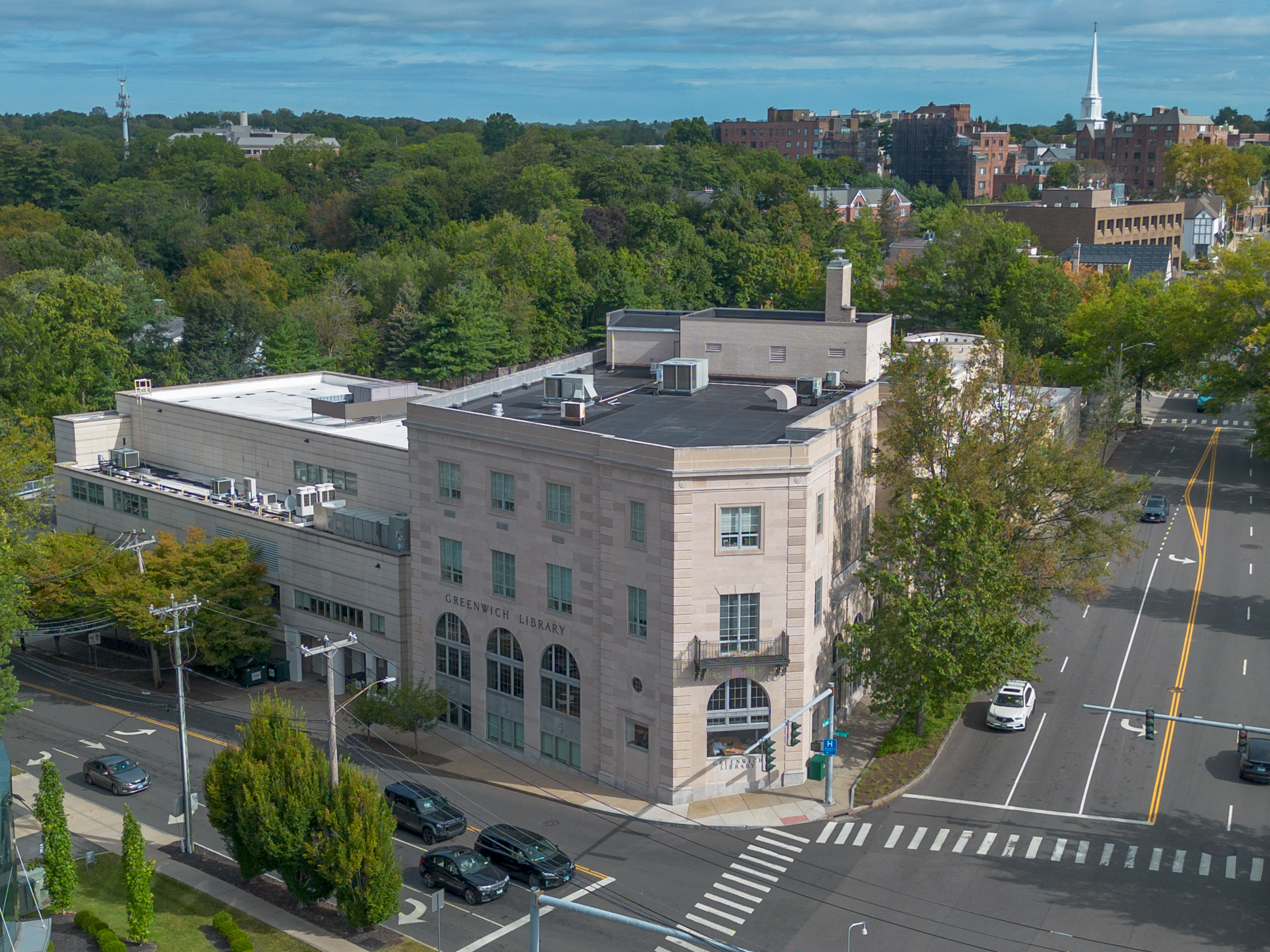
Greenwich Library in 2025

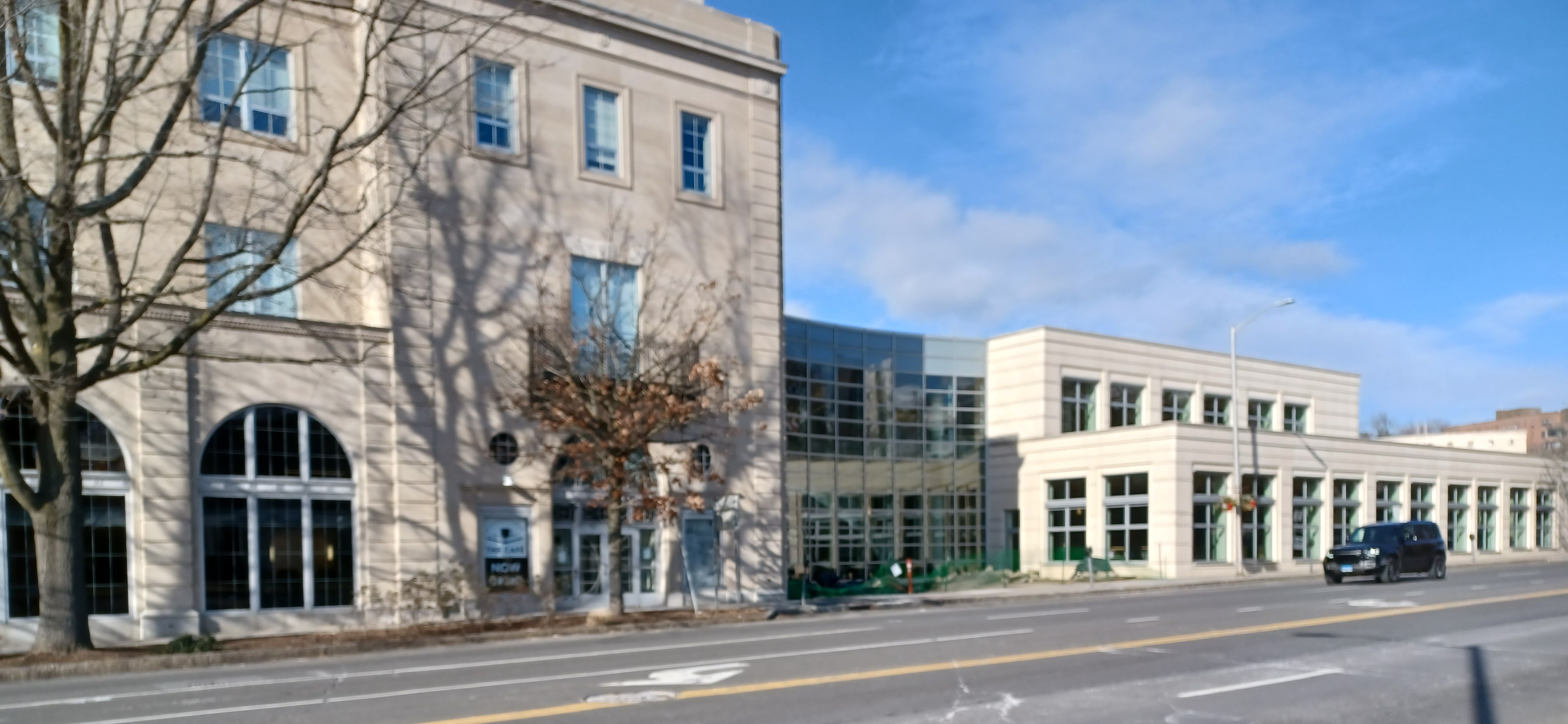
Greenwich Library

Greenwich Library is the main library in the Greenwich library system of Greenwich, Connecticut, United States. The Greenwich Library system consists of the Main Library and its Byram Shubert, Perrot, and Cos Cob branches.

== History ==
Originally established in 1800 with a collection of books housed in the Ebenezer Mead House, what was then known as the Greenwich Town Library and Greenwich Reading Room and Library Association began under an official subscription system of $6 shares beginning in 1805. Under this system, permitted members could borrow the same amount of books as the number of shares they owned. Non-members were not permitted access to the library's collection until 1878, although even then, borrowing books off-site remained exclusive to members.

With the collection growing steadily throughout the first half of the 1800s, the library was moved to the second floor of the Moshier Building on Greenwich Avenue in 1877, and later to the Ray Building across the street in 1884. Philanthropist and education advocate Elizabeth Milbank Anderson later gifted a new library building to Greenwich under the guidelines of establishing the library as a free, public institution and acquiring a designated building lot for the new space. The new building was opened in 1895, and four years later, the library established its services for free public use. The name was changed from the Greenwich Reading Room and Library Association to the Greenwich Library in 1907.

The library received funding from donations and a matched endowment from Milbank Anderson up until 1917, after which it was funded through a combination of private donations and public funding from taxpayers. Under the direction of librarian Isabelle Hurlblatt, the library also acquired funding for a gallery space in the new building, allowing the local artists of the Greenwich Society of Artists to showcase their work. This space would be named the Hurlblatt Gallery, later to be renamed the Flinn Gallery.

A greater expansion of the library was designated in the 1950s by library President Edward Seymour, whose initial attempt to raise $600,000 in 1956 failed. However, a second campaign, which included the purchase and redevelopment of the Franklin Simon & Co. department store and a donation of $100,000 from the town, succeeded, and the library was moved to its new space on West Putnam Avenue in March 1960. Further expansions over the next 50 years include the Marie Cole auditorium, which would provide a second-floor extension of the library and house non-fiction materials; the addition of a reading area and nine study rooms; the Flinn Gallery for showcasing educational art exhibitions; and the expansions of the main reading room, office spaces, and a café. In 1999 the library renovated the Putnam Avenue building and added a 32,000 sq. ft. wing designed by Cesar Pelli & Associates.

In 2017, the library received a five-star national library honor from Library Journal, marking its ninth time receiving the award since the award's conception in 2011.

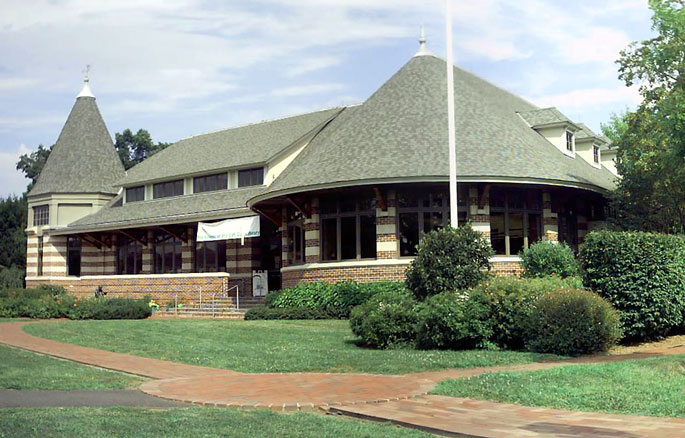
Cos Cob Library

== Branch libraries ==
The Cos Cob Library is located in Cos Cob area of the town of Greenwich, close to US Route 1. It was established in 1930 and is one of the branches of the Greenwich Library.

The Byram Shubert Library is the other branch.

== Perrot Memorial Library ==
Perrot Memorial Library built in 1931

Perrot Memorial Library is located in the Old Greenwich section of the town of Greenwich. It is owned by the Perrot Library Association, a private, non-profit 501(c)(3) organization, and is affiliated with but not part of the Greenwich Library. It shares library cards and a catalog. Unlike branch libraries in Greenwich, it has its own website. As of 2017, the collection includes about 60,000 books and the library subscribes to 110 periodicals. Circulation is over 240,000 items. The library building was designed by the 20th century architect D. Everett Waid who also donated the land and its architectural plans.

In 1998, the Radcliffe Children's Library, the newly constructed youth services wing, was completed. The wing is named after long time board member and benefactor Richard Radcliffe.

In 2009, two children's librarians, Kathryn McClelland and Kathleen Krasniewicz, who were in Denver, Colorado for the American Library Association's Midwinter meeting, were killed when their taxi was struck by a truck.

In 2017, the 1931 colonial-style library building was locally landmarked.

On February 3, 2025, Fred Camillo, First Selectman of Greenwich declared that date Kevin McCarthy day, in honor of Kevin McCarthy, tenth director of the Perrot Memorial Library.
