= Metropolitan Life Insurance Company Hall of Records =

Building in Yonkers, New York

- U.S. National Register of Historic Places
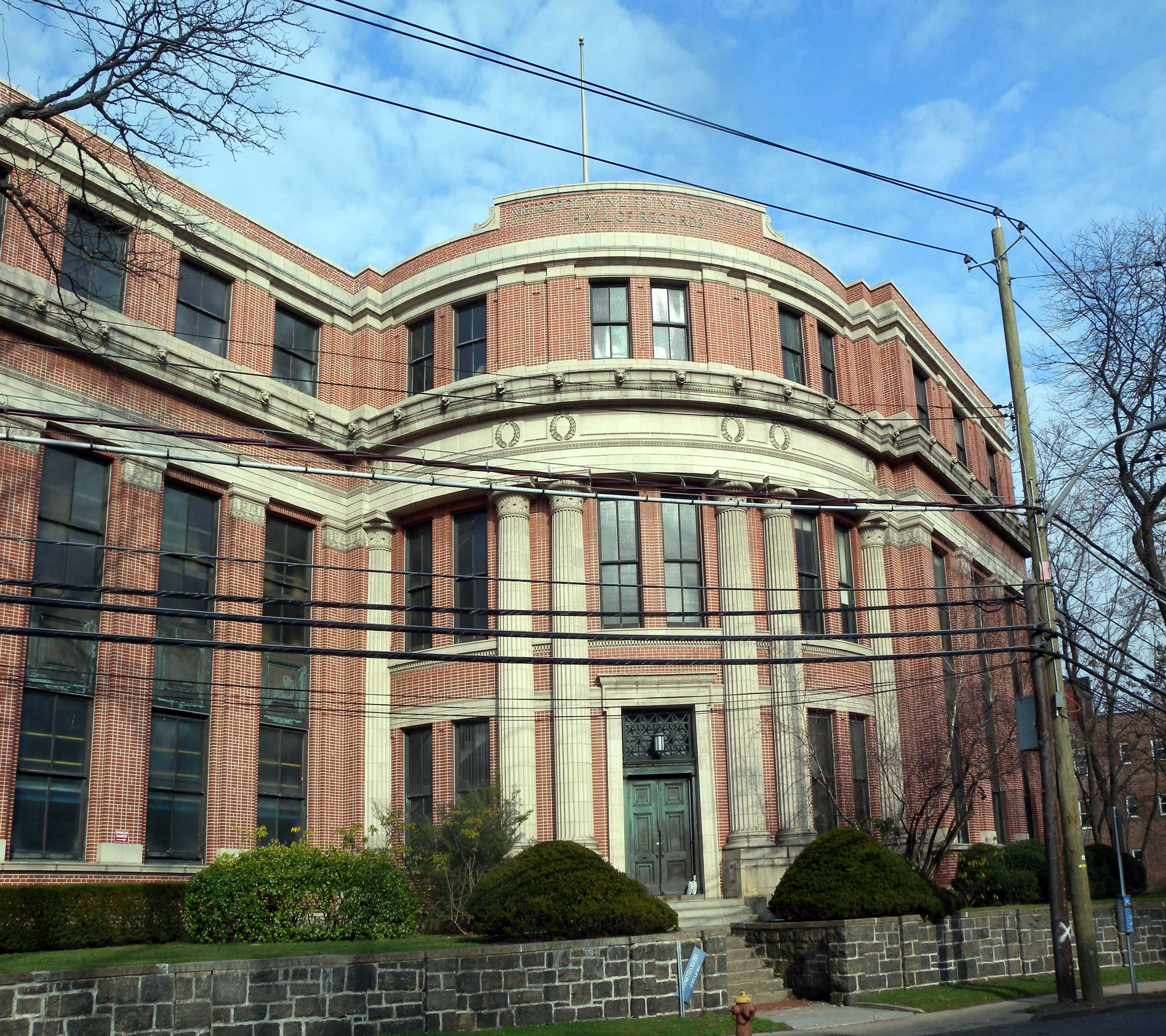
- Metropolitan Life Insurance Company Hall of Records, April 2009

- Location within New York Location within the United States
- Location: 759 Palmer Rd., Yonkers, New York
- Coordinates: 40°56′34″N 73°50′57″W
- Area: 0.97 acres (0.39 ha)
- Built: 1906, 1917, 1920, 1927, 1933, 1937
- Architect: D. Everett Waid
- Architectural style: Classical Revival
- NRHP reference No.: 14000543
- Added to NRHP: September 3, 2014

Metropolitan Life Insurance Company Hall of Records is a historic corporate archives located at Yonkers, Westchester County, New York. It was designed by architect D. Everett Waid and built by the Metropolitan Life Insurance Company in 1906.

The Classical Revival style building consists of a two-story section built in 1906, a third floor that was added in 1920, and additions that were constructed in 1917, 1927, 1933 and 1937. Despite the many additions, all designed by Waid, the consistent materials and ornamentation make the building appear as a single composition today. The L-shaped building has a convex portico the full height of the building with double two-story fluted cast stone columns at the interior of the "L" that frame the main entrance.

The fireproof building is constructed of steel frame and reinforced concrete, and has a brick curtain wall (the original 1906 part of the building has load-bearing brick walls atop a stone foundation). The windows and doors are clad in copper sheathing. A cornice with cast stone egg-and-dart molding and lion heads sits between the two lower floors from the top floor on all sides. Each floor originally covered 10,000 square feet and the one-acre lot on which it was built was purposefully oversized so that it was isolated from other buildings thus further increasing its likelihood of avoiding fires. At the time of construction, its only neighbors was a residential estate and a country club. Automatic fire doors were added between the original building and the rear additions to improve fire isolation in the now much larger building.

On the interior, the filing cases, doors, and interior fittings were made of metal. Originally, a custodian lived in the building to safeguard against incidents. Finishes are simple. With the 1927 addition, two interior loading bays were added on the west that lead to concrete docks. All floors except the basement include a freestanding mezzanine that was inserted in 1933 to provide more storage. The building included a lunchroom with the 1937 addition.

Following its 1937 addition, the building housed over 56 linear miles of filing space in shelving units and cabinets and remained under Metropolitan Life's ownership until 2006.

As of November 2019, it is approximately 100,000 square foot undergoing conversion to an apartment building containing 35 units ranging from 1,776 to 4,399 square feet that sold for $11,982,000. It covers about 60% of the one-acre property.

It was listed on the National Register of Historic Places in 2014.

== Operations ==
According to a company publication in 1939, originally, records were shipped from the Manhattan Home Office by freight train to the Bronxville Station and then by horse-drawn truck to the Hall of Records which was staffed full-time by one employee, Elijah G. Cattell. Cattell’s daughter, who lived with him, worked in the Manhattan Home Office. She brought home requests for records in the evening whereupon Mr. Cattell would retrieve the records. His daughter carried the records to the Home Office the next day. Despite estimates as late as 1914 that the Hall of Records was large enough for the some years to come, by 1917 a substantial addition was underway. By 1934, following three more additions, the Hall of Records was "manned by a staff of nearly 70".
