= D. Everett Waid =

American architect (1864–1939)

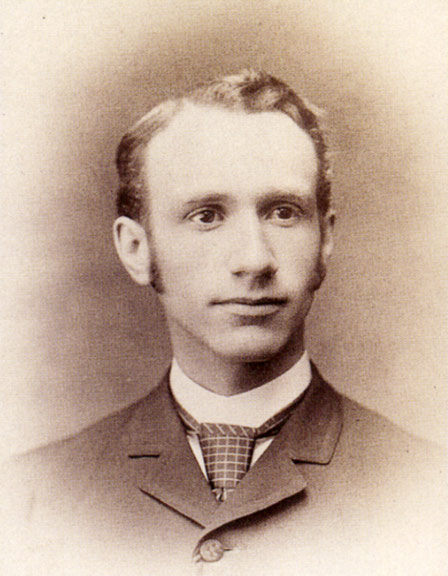
- (1887)
- Born: March 31, 1864; Gouverneur, New York
- Died: October 31, 1939 (aged 74–75); Old Greenwich, Connecticut
- Education: Monmouth College
- Occupation: Architect
- Buildings: Metropolitan Life North Building, New York City; Wellington Building, House of Commons, Ottawa, Ontario, Canada
- Projects: Architect to the Board of Foreign Missions of the Presbyterian Church; Mount McGregor Sanitarium, Wilton, New York

Dan Everett Waid (March 31, 1864–October 31, 1939) was a prominent 20th-century architect operating primarily in Illinois and New York. As chief architect for the Metropolitan Life Insurance Company (New York City), he and his partner designed the Home Office Building at 11 Madison Avenue along with dozens of other commercial, religious, residential and academic structures. He was appointed architect for the Board of Foreign Missions of the Presbyterian Church. He was also president of the American Institute of Architects (1924–1926).

== Early life ==
Waid was born in Gouverneur, New York, on March 31, 1864. At the age of 14, his family moved to Monmouth, Illinois, and after high school, he studied architecture at Monmouth College. He completed an architectural course at Columbia University in New York, New York in 1888 and a course at the Chicago Art Institute in 1894.

Waid graduated from Monmouth College in Illinois in 1887. The son of a dentist, he began his career as a bookkeeper at the site of the construction of a large grain elevator at Dubuque, Iowa, where he gained knowledge of practical construction methods.

He married Eva May Clark (1869 – June 11,1929) of Ottawa, Kansas on December 31, 1890, after having met in college (she was an 1887 graduate of Monmouth College in Illinois). At the time they lived at 1 Lexington Avenue, New York, New York and had been residents of New York City for approximately 30 years. From 1907 to 1930, Waid also owned a historic home, the Quintard Homestead (built c. 1800), in Old Greenwich, Connecticut, to which he built an addition and made historically sensitive modifications.

== Career ==
In 1888, he moved to Chicago, securing a position from 1884 to 1894 (however a photo indicated at least 1898) as a draftsman in the office of prominent architects Jenney & Mundie, where he rose to the position of head draftsman.

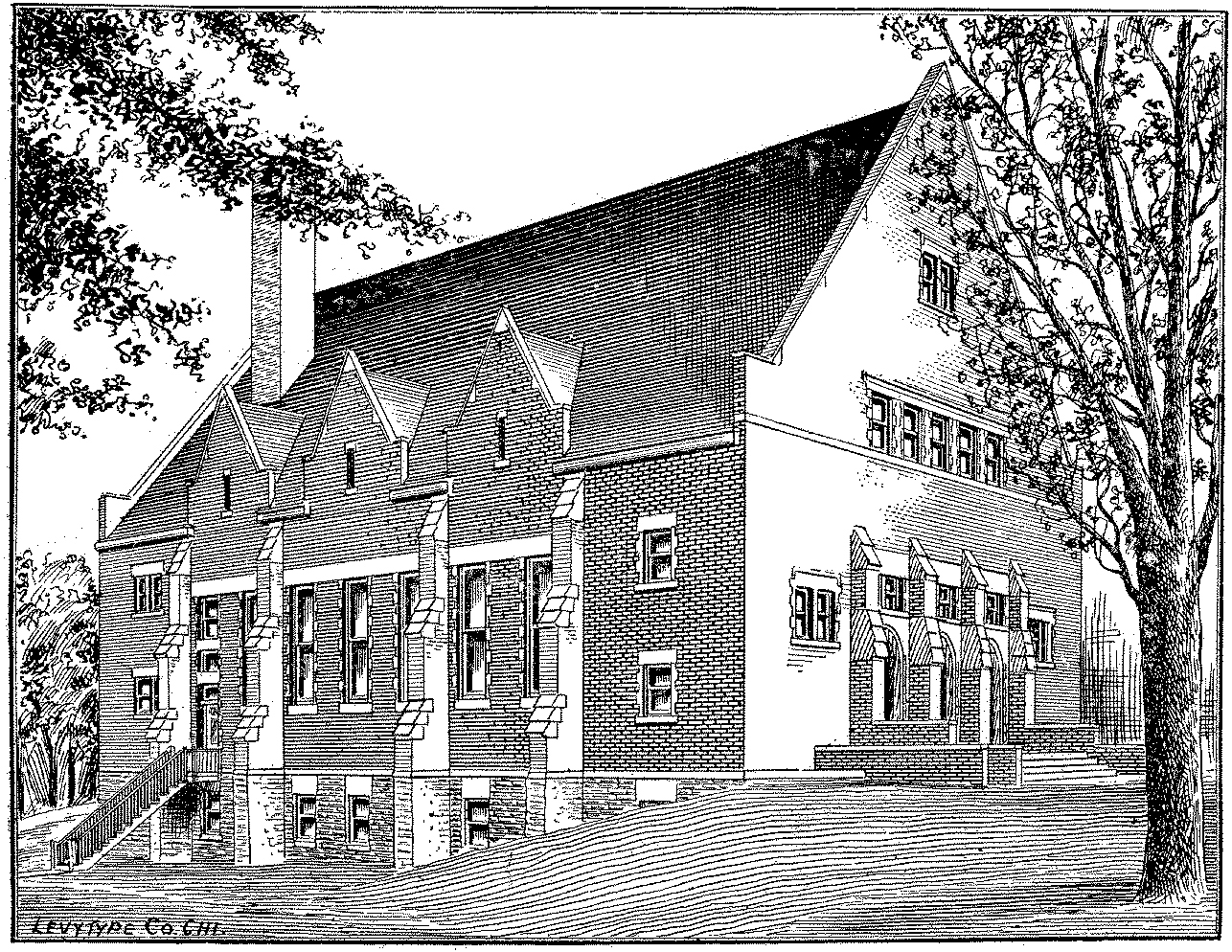
Monmouth College Auditorium designed by Waid and built in 1897. (Engraving, Old English Chapel/Gothic Revival)

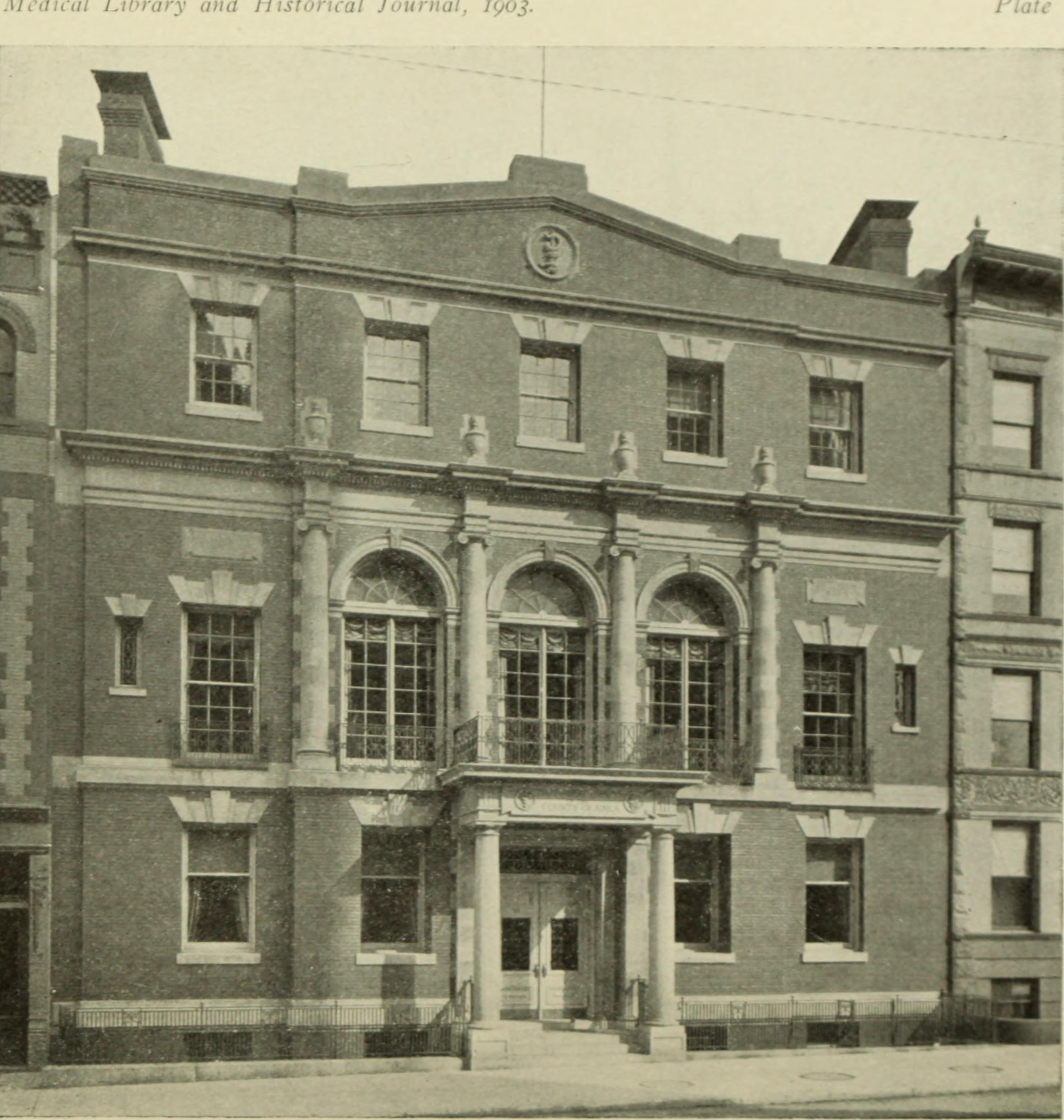
The Library of the Medical Society of the County of Kings was designed in Ionic Greek Revival style by Waid and built in 1897. (Photo from 1903)

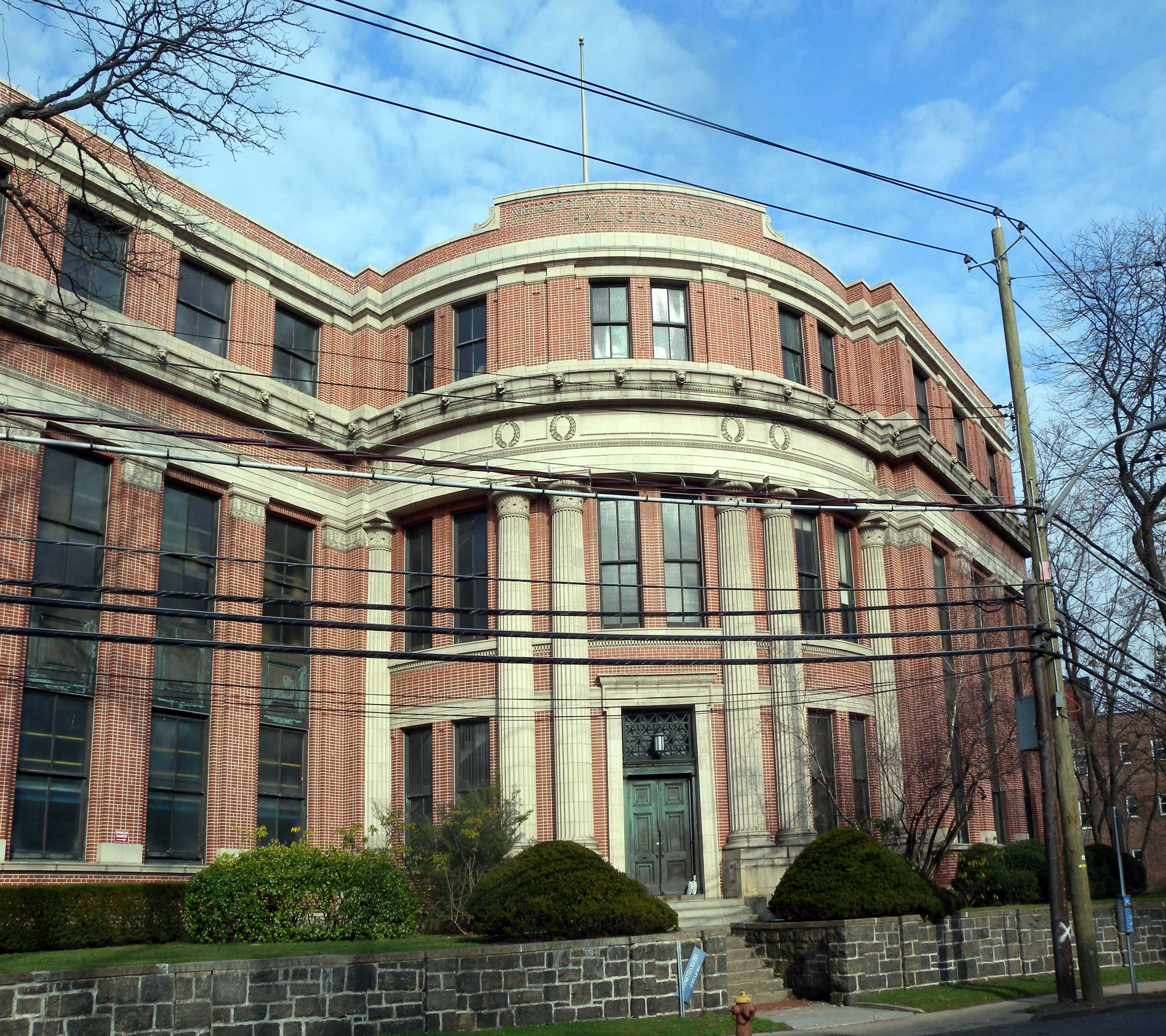
Looking east at Hall of Records (built 1906) of Metropolitan Life Insurance Company on a cloudy afternoon in 2009

In 1894, after taking a course at The Art Institute of Chicago, he became an independent architect. Shortly thereafter, Waid submitted two designs for buildings at Monmouth College (Illinois). Having moved to New York City by 1898, Waid and an associate, John Galen Howard, submitted the winning design in a competition for the Long Island College Hospital in Brooklyn, New York, where they acted as their own draftsmen and specification writers. When that job was completed, Waid opened a small office on Fifth Avenue in New York City and was also appointed architect for the Board of Foreign Missions of the Presbyterian Church, which had offices in the same building. This led to his design of hospitals in Alaska and Puerto Rico and schools in the western United States and Cuba. Around this time, Waid worked with architect Ralph N. Cranford.

In 1902, Waid began his first work as consulting architect for the Metropolitan Life Insurance Company of New York; eventually becoming its chief architect, this work continued until his death. Beginning that year, Waid's department at Metropolitan Life reviewed all plans and specifications for building projects that borrowed money from Metropolitan Life for bond or mortgage financing. These designs were evaluated for technical and aesthetic aspects, assessed for fire risk, and its overall design. Metropolitan Life was the largest lender in New York City real estate, therefore Waid's department represented an unprecedented use of an insurance company's financial clout to affect architectural design and construction. The Adjuster observed that Metropolitan Life was requiring fire standards exceeding that required by the city.

Waid's review of the aesthetics of construction projects caused Architectural Forum to claim that “many speculative builders, through their experiences with Metropolitan loans, have come to realize the financial value of higher standards and, in more than one case, have taken pride in erecting better buildings.” The Architectural Record asserted, “it is chiefly to Mr. Waid’s work for the Metropolitan...that we owe the advance in standards on permanent construction in New York.”

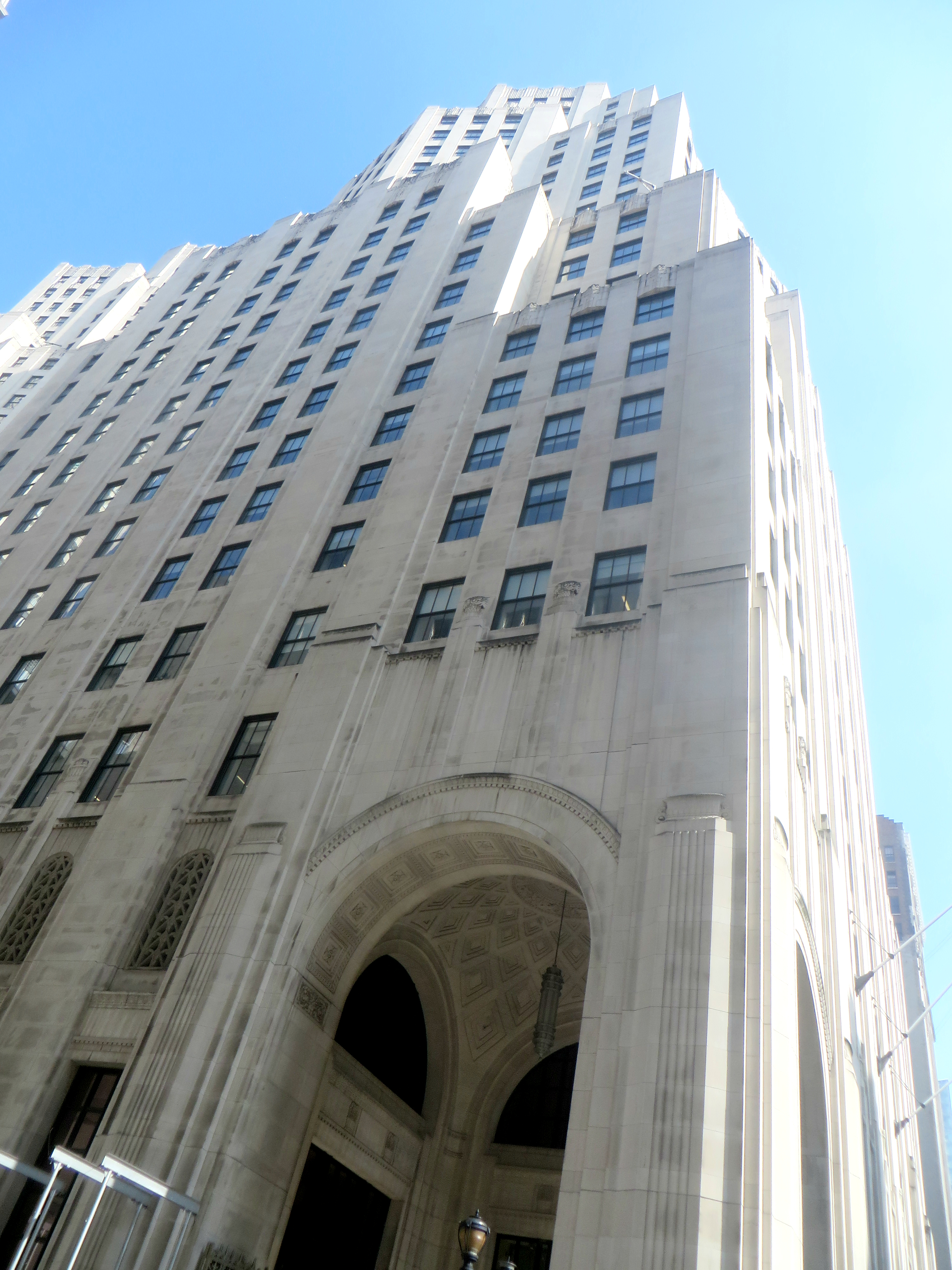
Metropolitan Life North Building, New York City (Art Deco)

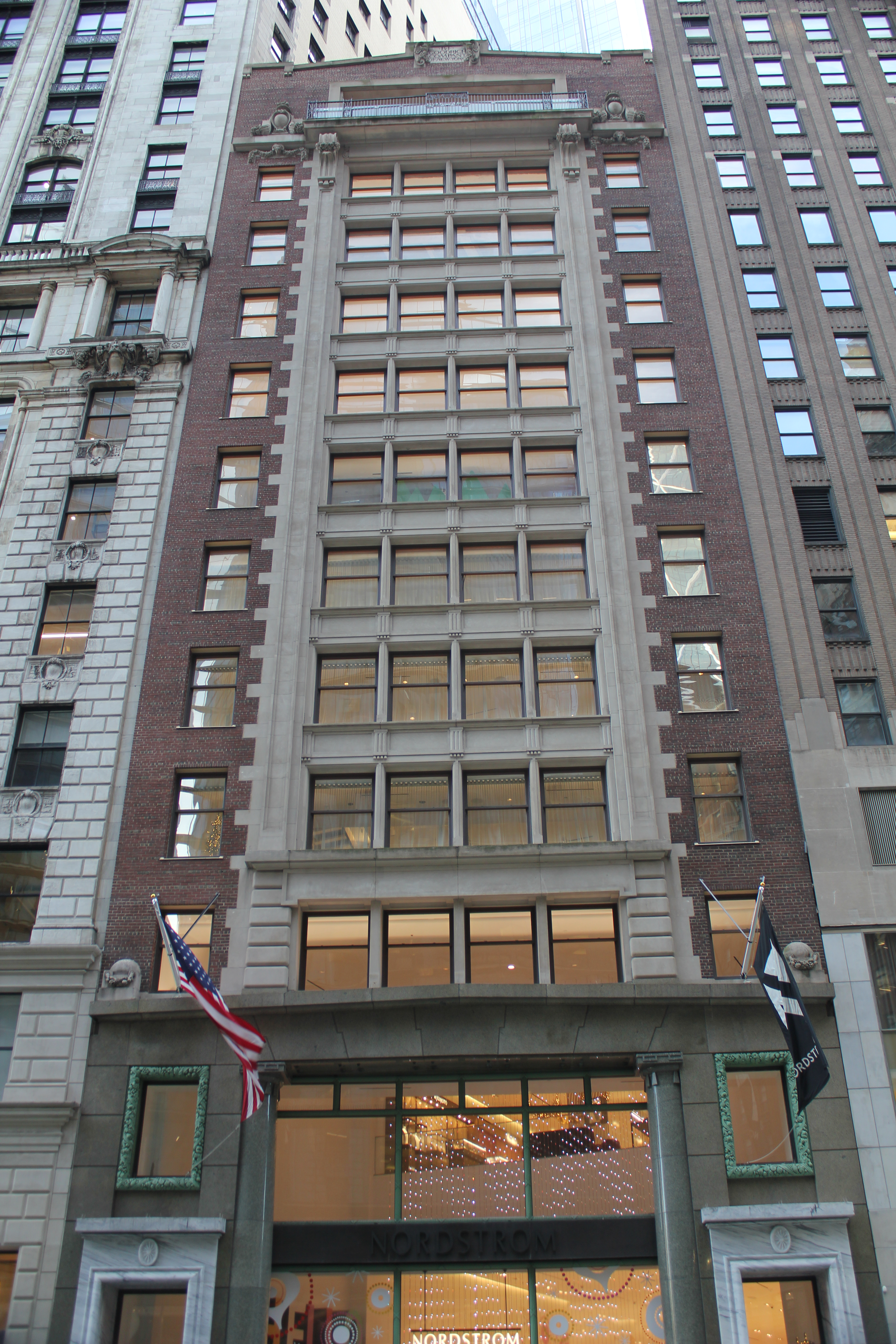
The landmark façade of 1780 Broadway built in 1909 (now part of the Central Park Tower) in Manhattan, New York City, as seen in December 2021, designed by Howard Van Doren Shaw in collaboration with Waid and Willauer.

Waid briefly worked with Arthur Ebbs Willauer (1876–1912) resulting in a small group of buildings that included the B.F. Goodrich Company buildings in Manhattan (1909) including 1780 Broadway (Waid and Willauer with Howard Van Doren Shaw). Waid and Willauer also designed an apartment house at 325 West 110th Street (1909).

During World War I, Waid served as deputy director of production and as one of the executives of the organization of architects that designed and built housing structures for some twenty-five shipbuilding yards.

He helped draft the New York City's new building code and was the first president of the New York state Board of Examiners and Registration of Architects from 1915 until 1923.

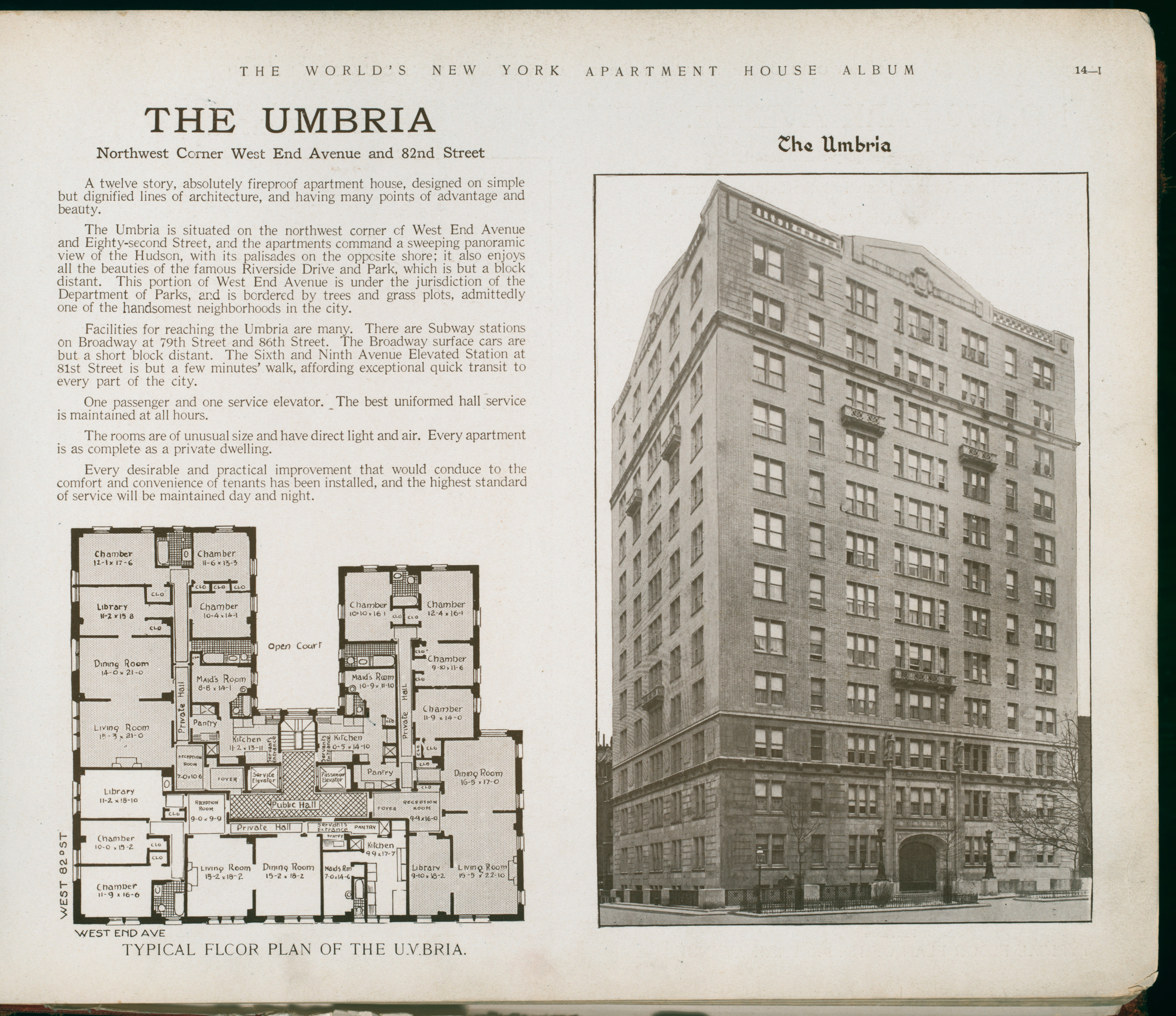
The Umbria, (1910–1911, Italian Renaissance); northwest corner West End Avenue and 82nd Street, New York City

Waid's career reached its pinnacle when he became chief architect for the Metropolitan Life Insurance Company and designed, with his business partner Harvey Wiley Corbett, the Home Office Building at 11 Madison Avenue and now known as the Metropolitan Life North Building. Originally planned to be the tallest building in the world at 100 stories, it was a victim of the depression and was capped off at 30 floors. In stark contrast with his early work, the modern office building would eschew, "extraneous ornament or embellishment which has not a rational meaning and practical use" and that it would be "unhampered by archaeological precedent."

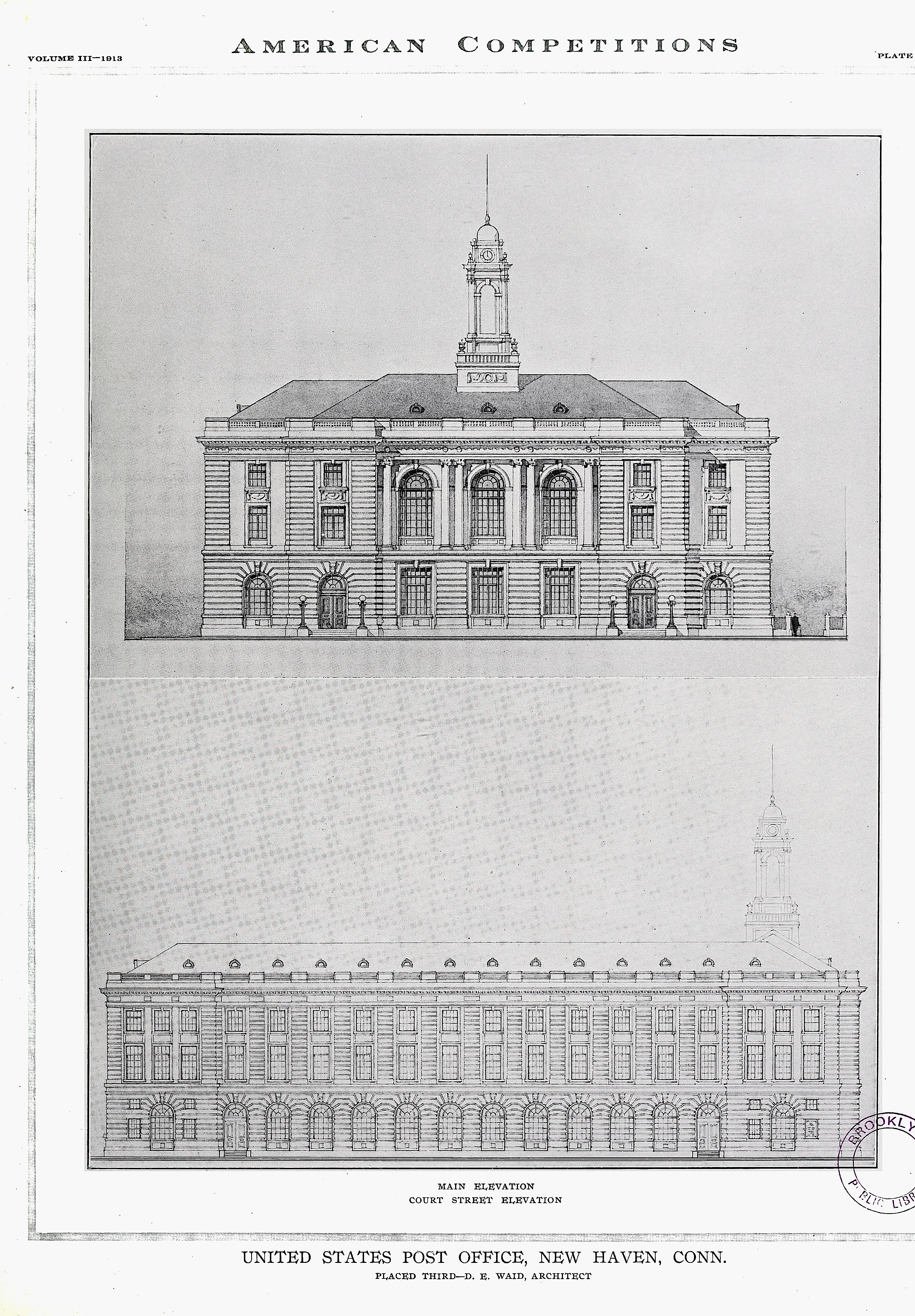
Elevations for Competition Design for U.S. Post Office in the Ionic Greek Revival style, New Haven, Connecticut submitted by Waid (1913, not built)

Waid was a consulting architect for the Empire State Building and Rockefeller Center in New York City.

Architects that worked for Waid gained experience that aided their careers including that of Henry Clossen Hibbs who worked for Waid from 1908–1909 and Bernhardt E. Muller who worked for Waid from 1912–1914.

== Later life, awards and philanthropy ==
Waid donated $80,000 towards a new gymnasium that his firm was designing for Monmouth College in 1923 and then topped off that gift with another $10,000 to build the Waid Swimming Pool in that building. At the time of his death, the Waids were the largest donors in the history of the college. Waid received an honorary advanced degree from Monmouth College in 1923.

Waid was elevated to a Fellow of the American Institute of Architects in 1910. He was president of the American Institute of Architects (AIA) from 1924 to 1926 and was awarded a gold medal by the New York Chapter of the AIA.

In 1925, as AIA president, Waid spoke of America's apathy to the beautiful in architecture in welcoming delegates to the opening of an exposition. He said that some American cities and towns were “intolerably hideous”. He said that architecture, expresses "the life, the education and the culture of the people as a whole" and exhorted that "buildings will be built substantially, durably and beautifully if the people wish, and just to the degree they wish." He went on to say that the aims of the exposition were, "to show in a comprehensive way the achievements of the best architects and their fellow-craftsmen" and to demonstrate how "to use those achievements as an object lesson to stimulate the appreciation of the public and to stimulate ambition to build, when we build, more wisely in plan; more substantially, more safely, more durably and more beautifully.”

In his second year as president of the AIA, Waid committed the organization to be more involved in the Building Congress movement noting the significance of the "personal contact of craftsmen, builders, manufacturers of building material and architects, all welded in the membership of one organization. Such organizations, usually known as Building Congresses, have accomplished much and hold bright promise for the future.”

He received the New York Chapter AIA award for distinguished service to the profession in 1929.

Perrot Memorial Library's Waid building, Old Greenwich, Connecticut (1930–1931) as seen in 2011

After the death of his first wife in 1929, he endowed the fine arts department at Monmouth College in her memory. In November 1929, Waid donated $100,000 to the Presbyterian National Board of Missions in memory of her. Waid was a founder of the Historical Society of Greenwich and one of the founders of the Perrot Memorial Library of Greenwich, Connecticut. Circa 1930, he donated the land and the architectural plans for the construction of the Library with one proviso that a room in the new library be dedicated to his late wife (now called the Waid Room). He privately published a book in her honor in 1931 called Mrs. Dan Everett Waid – Personal Letters and an Outline of Her Life 1869–1929; which was reprinted in 2011.

Waid was on the Board of Advisory Architects involved in the restoration of the Wren Building at the College of William and Mary in 1928–1931.

He married a second time, to Phyllis Fellowes Colmore, a British subject, on February 2, 1934, but had no children from that or his former marriage. This marriage ended in divorce.

He was president of the Architectural League of New York, a member of the Metropolitan Museum of Art, the American Museum of Natural History, the New York Zoological Society and the Audubon Society. His clubs included the National Arts, Players and the Century of New York, the Queens Valley Golf, the Salmagundi, and the Greenwich (Connecticut) Country.

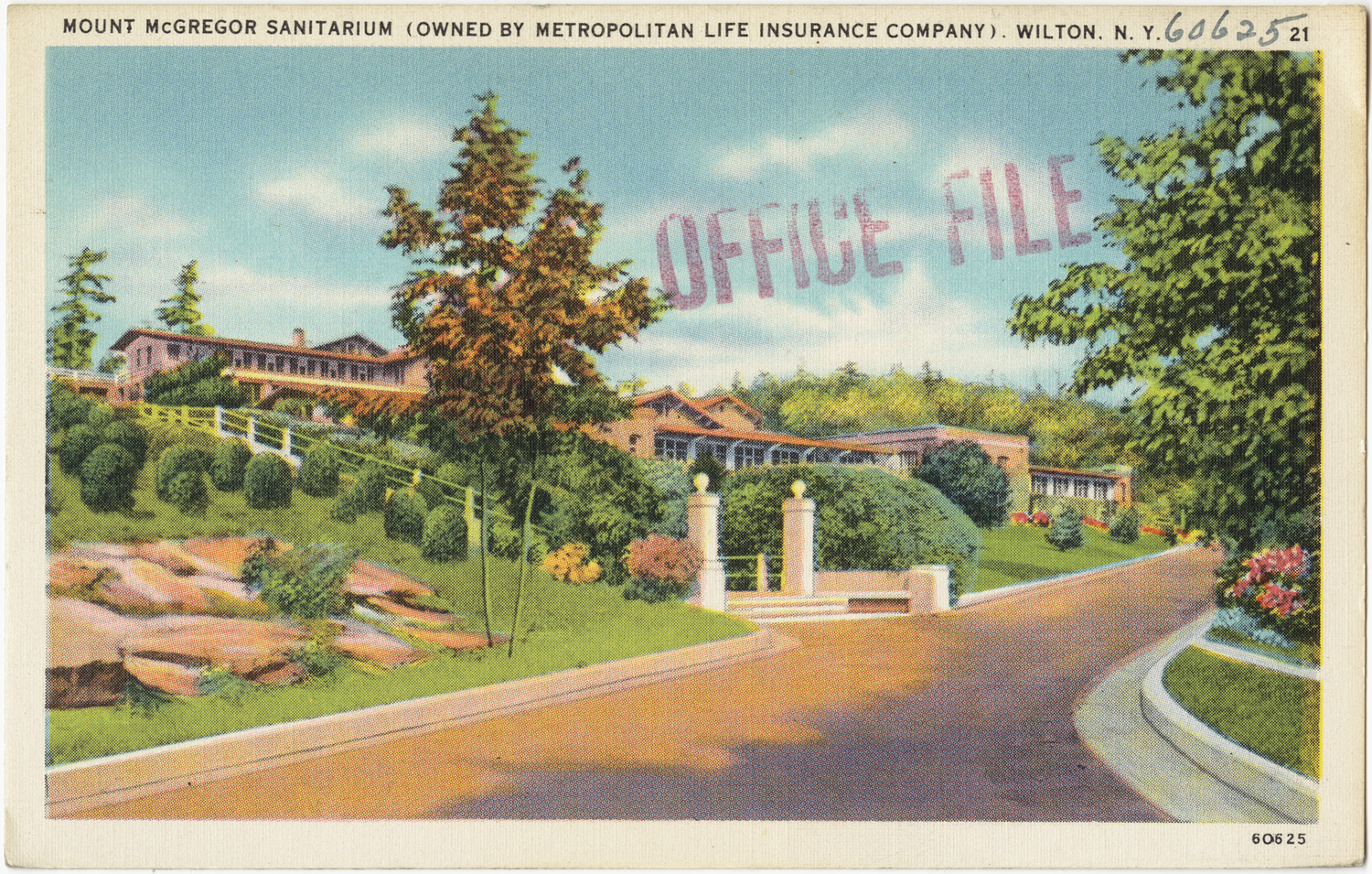
Mount McGregor Sanitarium (American Craftsman), Wilton, New York

During World War I, he was deputy director of housing for the Emergency Fleet Corporation. In 1929 the New York chapter of the American Institute of Architects awarded its medal to him “for distinguished work.” He established and funded the Waid Lecture Fund of the American Institute of Architects.

In late 1938, Waid was chosen as chairman of the executive committee of the National Arts Club in New York City.

Waid died at his summer home on October 31, 1939, at Old Greenwich, Connecticut after undergoing an operation for an abdominal ailment in August 1939. He left $300,000 to the American Institute of Architects. After a funeral was held at the First Presbyterian Church, New York City, he was cremated and his ashes were buried in Monmouth, Illinois.

== Selected Projects ==
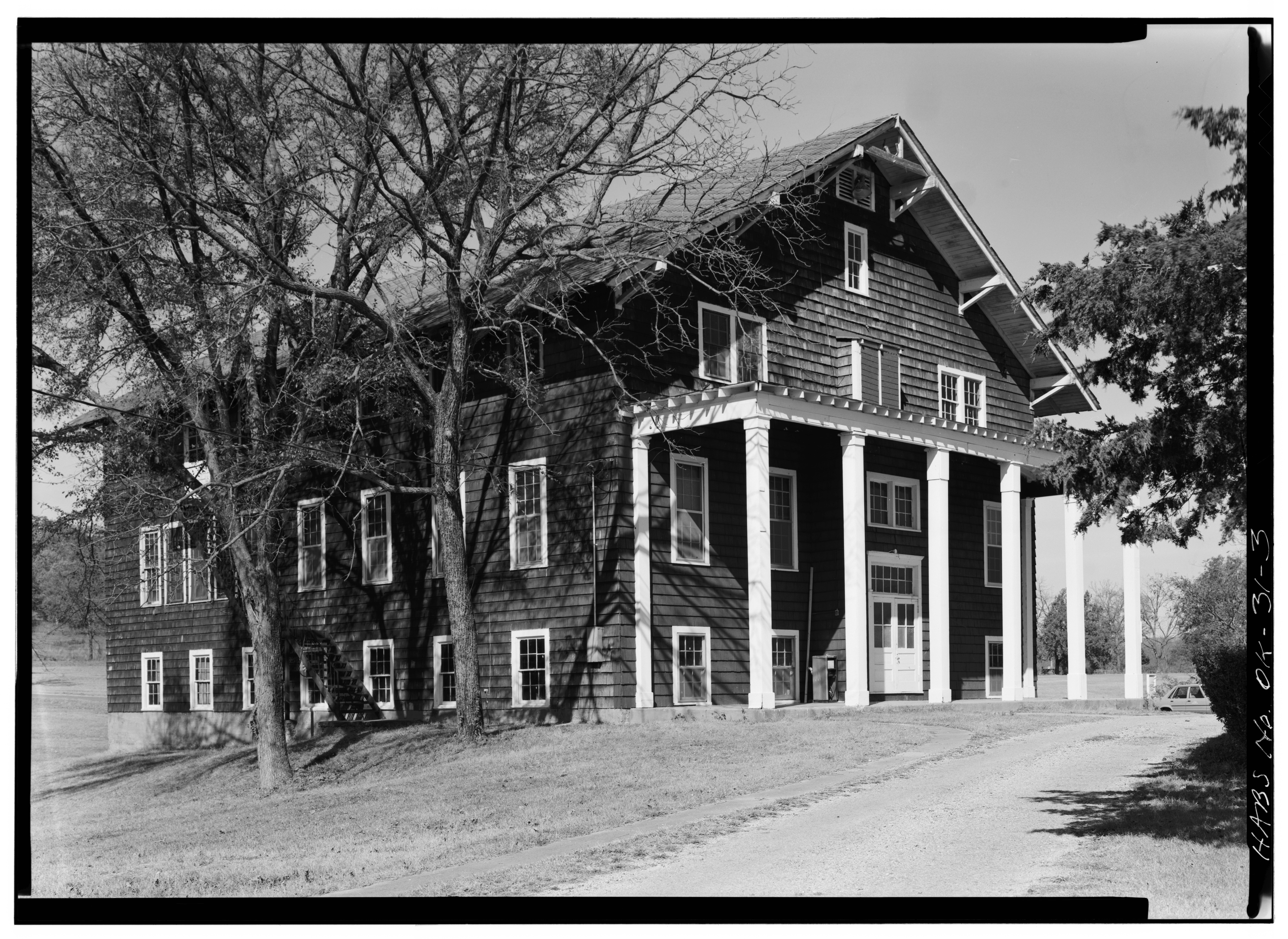
Shown is a typical build for the Presbyterian Board of Missions designed by Waid; east (front) and south elevations, Dwight Mission, Administration Building, Rural Route, Sallisaw, Sequoyah County, Oklahoma (built 1917)

Among the many buildings Waid designed were:

- Girl's Mutual Benefit Club, 1614 W. Superior St. (originally 531 W. Superior) [?], Chicago, Illinois (1892, Richardsonian Romanesque) designed by Jenney, Mundie, and Waid while Waid worked at Jenney & Mundie
- Monmouth College Auditorium & Gymnasium, Monmouth, Illinois (1895, Richardsonian Romanesque, not built)
- Monmouth College Auditorium & Chapel, Monmouth, Illinois (designed 1895, built 1897, Old English Chapel/Gothic Revival)
- Fifth Presbyterian Church, Ravenswood neighborhood, Chicago (1896, Gothic Revival)
- Free Public Library of the Medical Society of the County of Kings, Brooklyn, New York (1897, Ionic Greek Revival) also known as the Brooklyn Medical Library Building (Waid & Cranford) designed together with Waid's partner Ralph N. Cranford
- Numerous residences in the Chicago, Illinois area including in Evanston, Illinois, in 1900
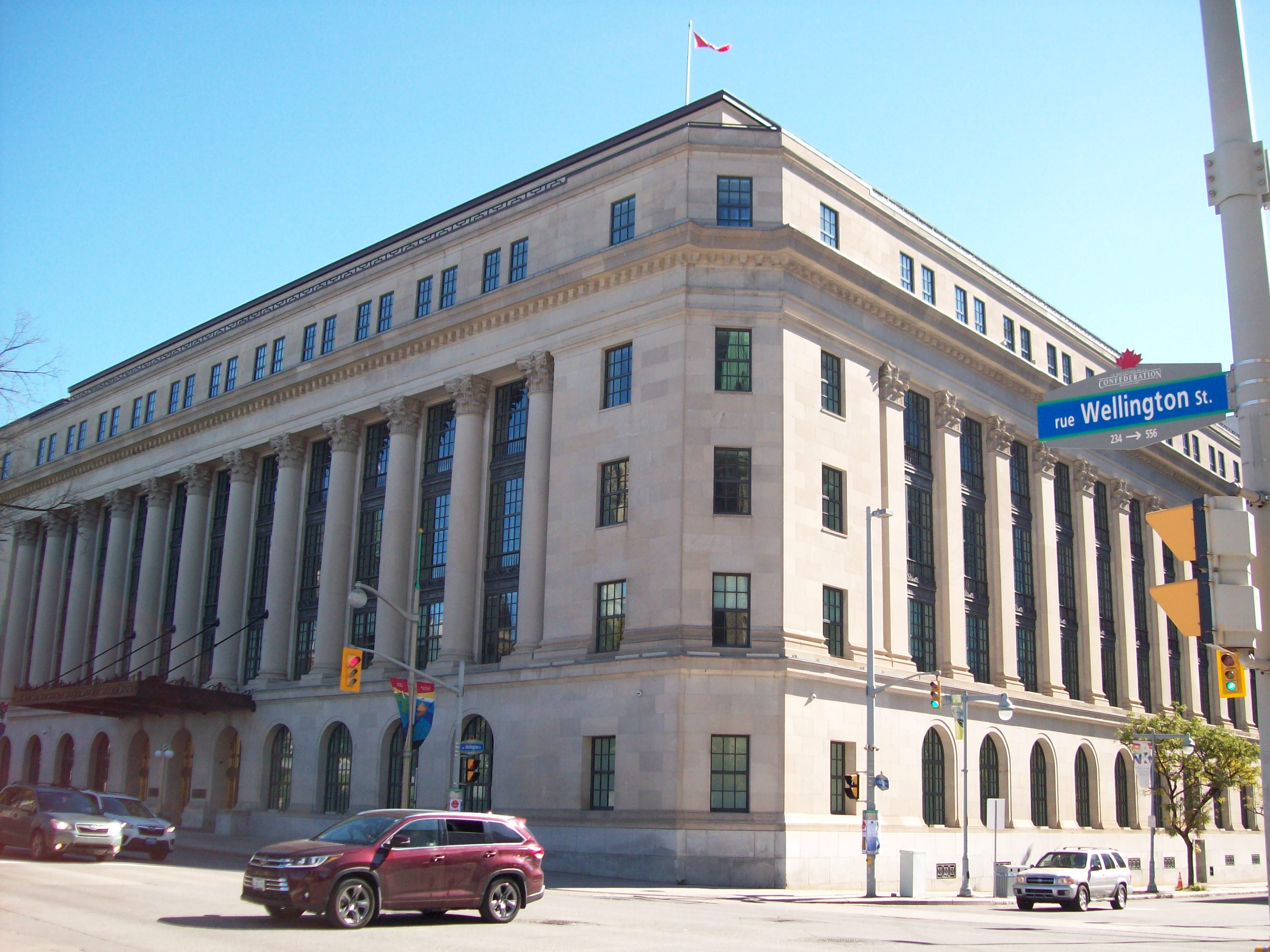
- The Beaux-Arts style Wellington Building designed by Waid in 1924; restored in 2016, is now occupied by the Canadian House of Commons in Ottawa, Ontario, Canada
  Waid's own residence in Chicago at 9332 S. Damen Avenue (1894, American Queen Anne) was later occupied by future U.S. Supreme Court Justice John Paul Stevens
- Metropolitan Life Insurance Company Hall of Records, Yonkers, New York, listed on the National Register of Historic Places in 2014 (1906, Classical Revival)
- Metropolitan Life Insurance Company building, 52nd Street near Market Street, Philadelphia, Pennsylvania
- B.F. Goodrich Building at 1780 Broadway (Waid and Willauer with Howard Van Doren Shaw) together with an additional eight-story Goodrich structure at 225 West 57th Street in 1909 by Waid and Willauer; the building was of enough architectural importance that the façade remains, incorporated into the Central Park Tower whose construction resulted in the demolishing of the surrounding buildings
- 325 West 110th Street, New York City, an apartment building (1909)
- The Umbria, a 12-story apartment building (now a residential co-op) in the Riverside-West End Historic District Extension, New York City (1910–1911, Italian Renaissance Revival)
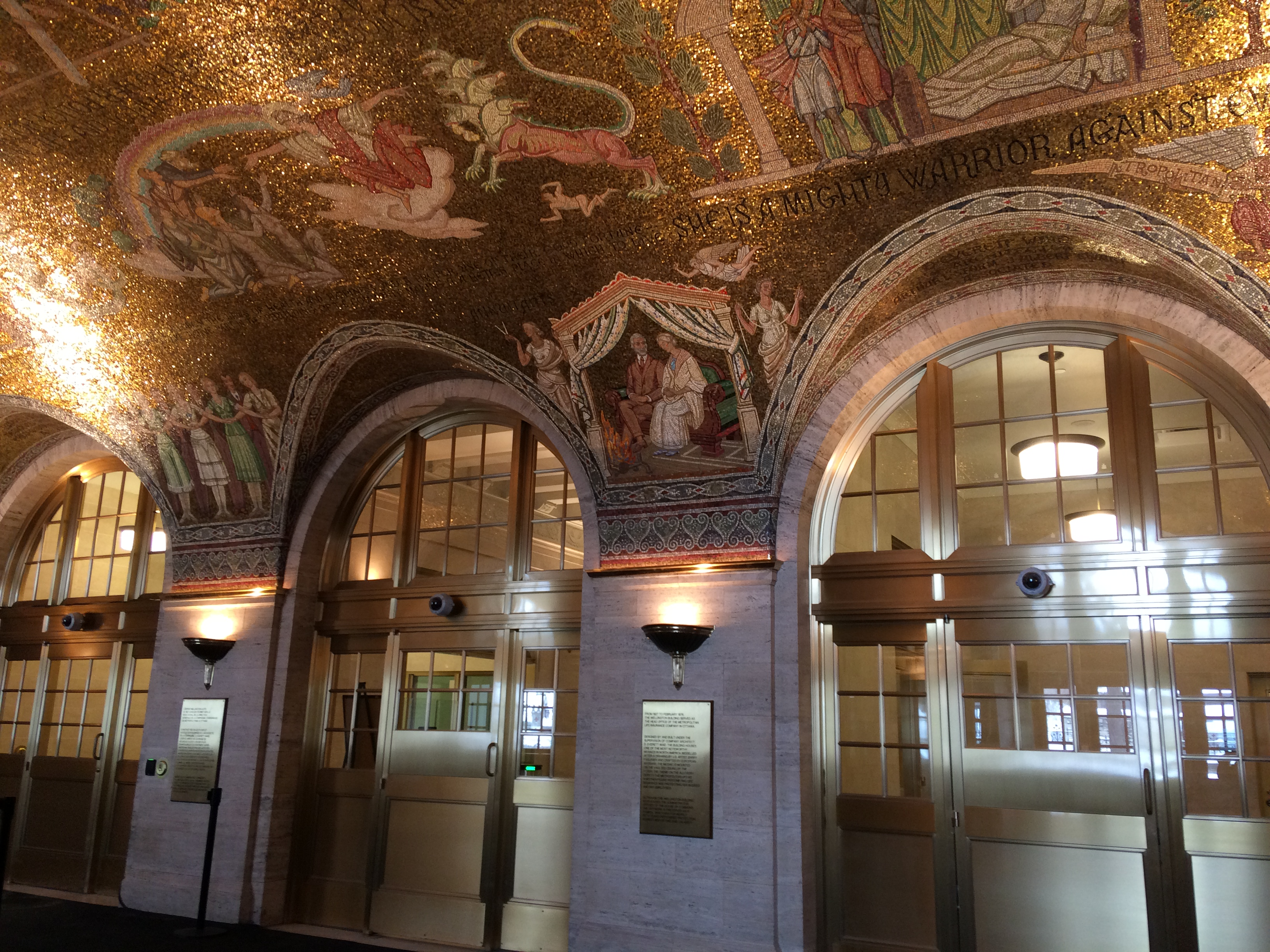
- Byzantine-style mosaic ceiling in lobby of Wellington Building (1924–1927) restored in 2016
  McGregor Sanitarium near Saratoga Springs, New York, a complex of over 30 buildings (started 1911, completed c. 1929, American Craftsman; chapel built in Mission Revival)
- U.S. Post Office, New Haven, Connecticut (1913, Ionic Greek Revival, not built)
- Dwight Mission, Administration Building and Auditorium, Sallisaw, Sequoyah County, Oklahoma (1917, Shingle) and numerous other buildings for the Presbyterian Board of Missions
- Metropolitan Life Insurance Company Tower, northern annex expansion, in New York City (1921); included a skybridge to the neighboring Home Office building The building was demolished in 1946 to make way for an expansion of the Metropolitan Life North Building also designed by Waid
- Metropolitan Life Insurance Company Printing Plant, Long Island City, opposite the Queens County Courthouse (c. 1920), a three-story 180,000 square foot printing plant and bindery
- Monmouth College Gymnasium, Monmouth, Illinois (1923, Classical Revival)
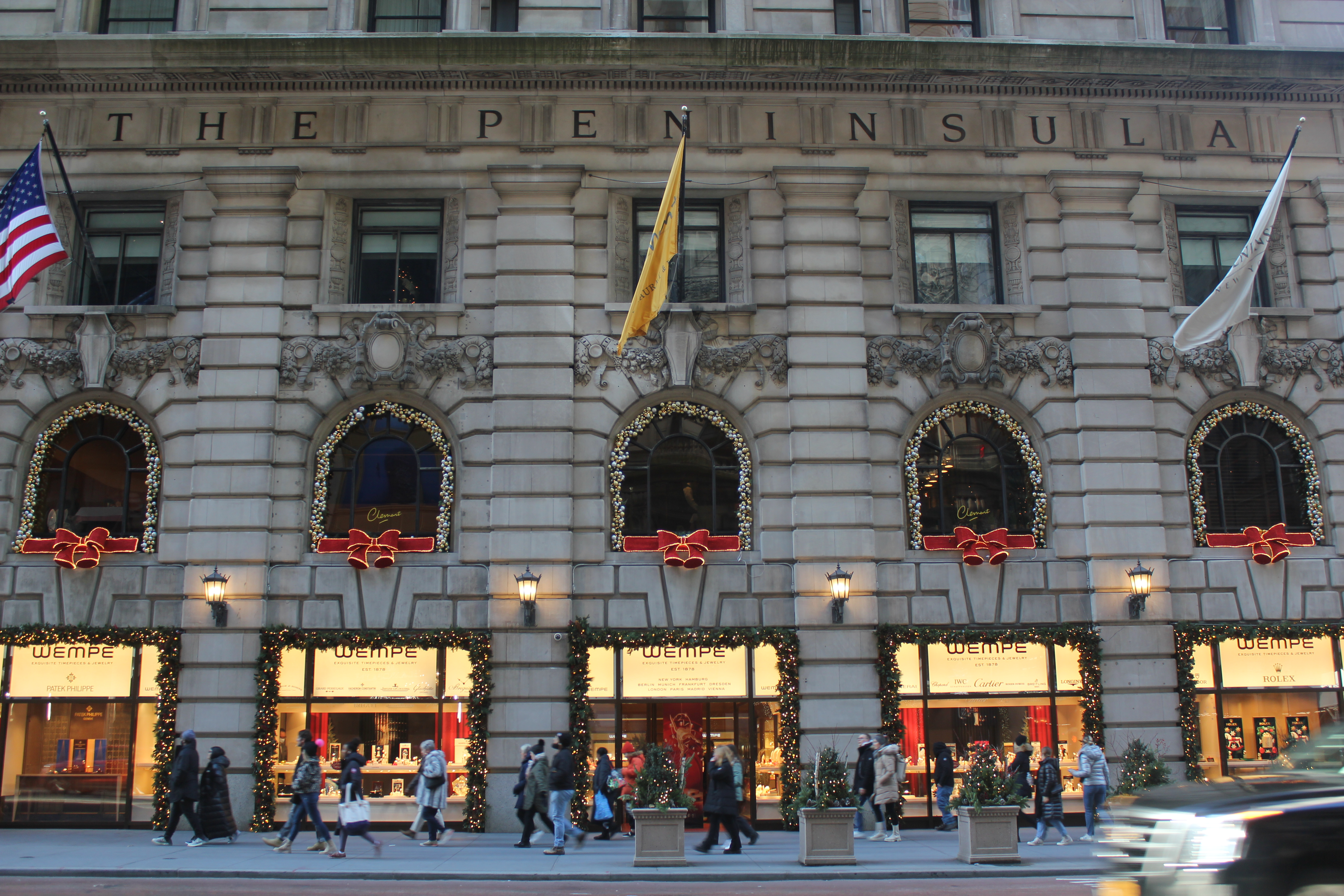
  The Peninsula New York hotel at Fifth Avenue and 55th Street, seen in December 2022. Pictured is the Fifth Avenue façade of which the ground floor storefronts and numerous interiors on the first and second floor were redesigned by Waid in 1938.
- The Acropolis, designed by Andrew J. Thomas and D. Everett Waid, an apartment building at 21-16 35th Street, Queens, New York City, New York (1923) was "the first such project sponsored by the Metropolitan Life Insurance Co..."
- Metropolitan Life Building now Wellington Building, House of Commons, Ottawa, Ontario, Canada (1924–1927, Beaux-Arts)
- Labor Temple, architects Emery Roth and D. Everett Waid, 223 2nd Avenue, New York, New York (1925, Italian Renaissance Revival)
- Buildings at The College of Wooster, Ohio, including President's House (c. 1926, Gothic Revival), Douglass Hall (1929, Collegiate Gothic, a dormitory), Galpin Hall (1932, Gothic Revival, administrative offices), Babcock Hall (1936, Collegiate Gothic, a dormitory) and at least one of the Henderson Memorial Apartments (1939)
- Metropolitan Life North Building, New York City (started 1928, finished 1950, Art Deco) originally designed to be 100 stories tall and built with foundations, elevators, etc. to support that height, due to the Crash of 1929, only 30 stories were built
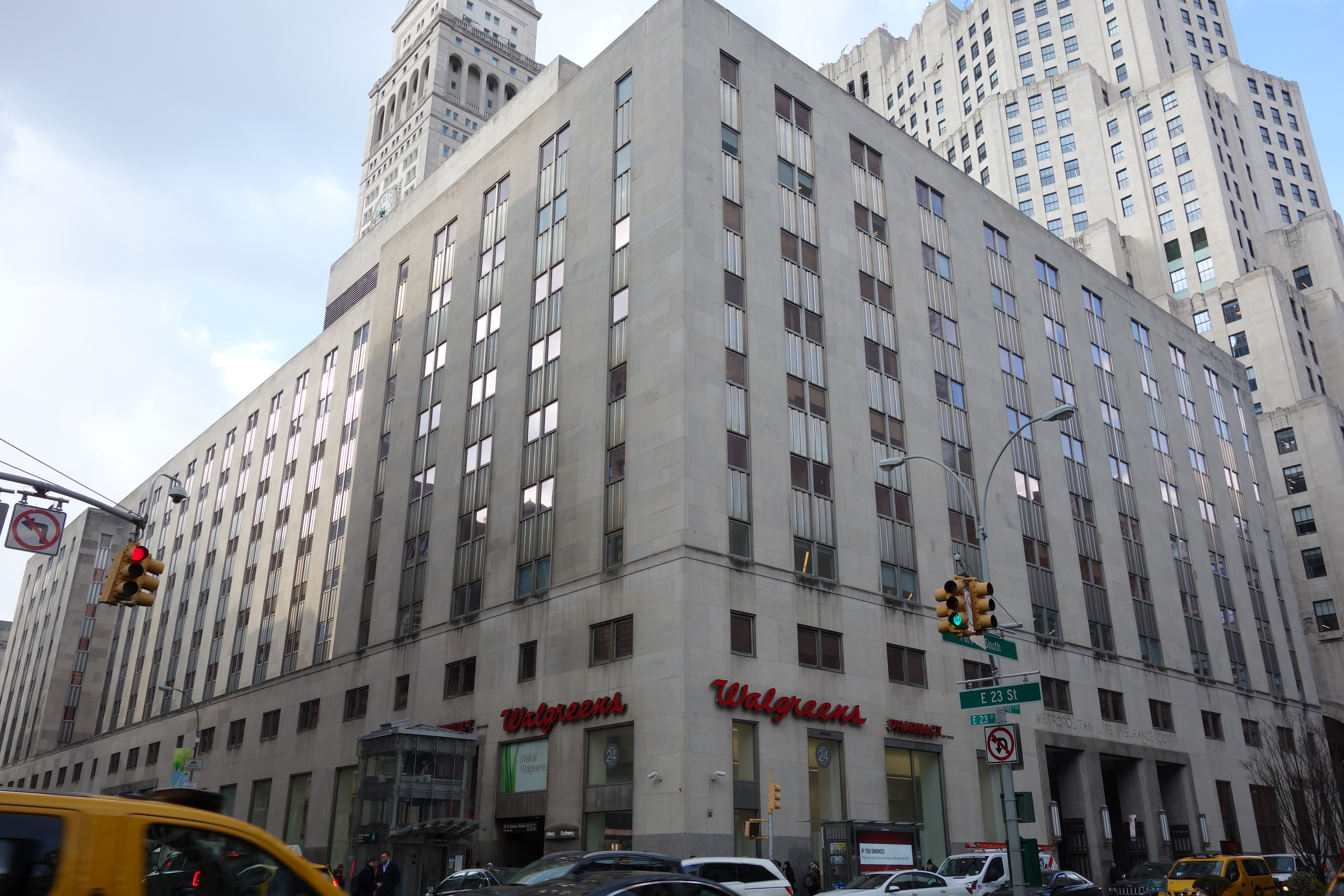
  One Madison Avenue east wing prior to it receiving a glass tower addition and makeover of the existing limestone building in 2020; the building complements the Metropolitan Life North building in the background, upper right
- Silver Cross Hospital, Joliet, Illinois
- Perrot Memorial Library, Old Greenwich, Connecticut, inspired by Monticello, the home of Thomas Jefferson (1930, Jeffersonian Neo-Classical) – Waid donated the land and the architectural plans for this building
- Numerous redesigns of the interior and exterior of buildings and landscape architecture in New York City including the bronze and marble Pulitzer Fountain (in 1936); the Peninsula Hotel bronze-and-glass recessed storefronts at ground level plus a new dining room, the hotel's offices, and exhibitions space on the second floor; and a complete renovation of the interior of midtown Manhattan's The Wilbraham converting it to an apartment building (1935).
- Interior projects for individual clients such as "Alteration to the south apartment on the 11th and 12th story of One Lexington Avenue" (1932) whose plans now reside at the library of Columbia University and the 1908–1913 interior of Trail End (John B. Kendrick Mansion), Sheridan, Wyoming, now a state historic site and listed on the U.S. National Register of Historic Places.
- One Madison Avenue east wing (1953–1955, late Art Moderne) complements the Metropolitan Life North Building and was built to designs by Waid well after his death in 1939
