= Grand Canal (Venice) architecture =

Central water course in Venice, Italy

The Grand Canal (Italian: Canal Grande; Venetian: Canałaso) is the central water course in the city of Venice, Italy.

The following table lists the architectural and navigational landmarks on the two sides of the canal, listed from west to east. Water features have a blue background. Bridges have a light grey background.

RIGHT SIDE	LEFT SIDE
Ponte della Libertà
Ex Monastery of Santa Chiara (now Questura or Police Precinct)	Railway area
Canal of Santa Chiara	Railway area
Ponte della Costituzione
Piazzale Roma vaporetto station	Old Railway Station buildings
Rio Novo	Old Railway Station buildings
Papadopoli Gardens	Old Railway Station buildings
Rio della Croce	Old Railway Station buildings
Palazzo Emo Diedo	Santa Lucia Train Station
Wool-cloth Weavers Guildhall	Santa Lucia Train Station
Church of San Simeone Piccolo	Santa Lucia Train Station
Palazzo Adoldo	Santa Lucia Train Station
Palazzo Foscari-Contarini	Church of Santa Maria di Nazareth or Scalzi
Ponte degli Scalzi
Rio Marin	Ferrovia vaporetto station
Campo San Simeon Grande	Palazzo Calbo Crotta
	Hotel Principe
	Rio Tera' dei Sabbioni
	Hotel Continental
	Casa Cini
	Casa Seguso
Palazzo Gritti	Palazzo Flangini
Palazzo Corner	Scuola dei Morti
Palazzo Donà Balbi	San Geremia
Riva di Biasio vaporetto station	Canale di Cannaregio
Palazzo Marcello Toderini	Palazzo Emo a San Leonardo
	Palazzo Querini
Rio di San Zan Degolà	Palazzo Correr Contarini Zorzi
Palazzo Giovanelli	Palazzo Gritti
Casa Correr	San Marcuola
Traghetto Museo	Traghetto San Marcuola
Fondaco dei Turchi (Museum of Natural History)	San Marcuola vaporetto station
Rio del Fondaco dei Turchi	Rio di San Marcuola
Fondaco del Megio	Ca' Vendramin Calergi; winter home of Casino
Palazzo Belloni Battagia	Ca' Vendramin Calergi; winter home of Casino
Rio di Ca' Tron	Ca' Vendramin Calergi; winter home of Casino
Ca' Tron (IUAV)	Palazzo Marcello
Palazzo Duodo	Palazzo Erizzo alla Maddalena
Palazzo Priuli Bon	Palazzo Soranzo Piovene
San Stae vaporetto station	Palazzo Emo alla Maddalena
San Stae	Palazzo Molin Querini
Gold Craftsmen Guildhall	Rio della Maddalena
Rio della Rioda	Palazzo and Palazzetto Barbarigo
Palazzo Coccina Giunti Foscarini Giovannelli
Rio della Pergola	Palazzo Gussoni Grimani Della Vida
Ca' Pesaro (Museum of Modern Art)	Rio di Noale
Rio di Ca' Pesaro (or delle Due Torri)	Palazzetto da Lezze
Palazzo Donà a Santa Croce	Palazzo Boldù a San Felice
Palazzo Correggio	Palazzo Contarini Pisani
Ca' Corner della Regina
Ca' Favretto	Rio di San Felice
Rio di San Cassiano	Palazzo Fontana Rezzonico
Palazzo Morosini Brandolin	Palazzo Giusti
Fondamenta dell'Olio	Ca' d'Oro (Galleria Giorgio Franchetti)
Fondamenta dell'Olio	Ca' d'Oro vaporetto station
Palazzo della Pretura	Palazzo Giustinian Pesaro
Rio delle Beccarie	Ca' Sagredo
Pescaria	Campo and Traghetto Santa Sofia
Campo and Traghetto della Pescaria	Palazzetto Foscari
Campo and Traghetto della Pescaria	Palazzo Michiel dalle Colonne
Fabbriche Nuove	Palazzo Michiel del Brusà
Fabbriche Nuove	Palazzo Smith Mangilli Valmarana
Fabbriche Nuove	Rio dei Santi Apostoli
Fabbriche Nuove	Ca' da Mosto
Fabbriche Nuove	Palazzo Bollani Erizzo
Fabbriche Nuove	Rio di San Giovanni Crisostomo
Fabbriche Vecchie	Campiello del Remer
Fabbriche Vecchie	Palazzo Civran
Fabbriche Vecchie	Casa Perducci
Fabbriche Vecchie	Palazzo Ruzzini
Fabbriche Vecchie	Rio del Fontego dei Tedeschi
Palazzo dei Camerlenghi	Fondaco dei Tedeschi (Poste italiane)
Rialto Bridge
Palazzo dei Dieci Savi (Scarpagnino)	Riva del Ferro
Fondamenta del Vin	Rialto vaporetto station
Fondamenta del Vin	Palazzo Dolfin Manin (Banca d'Italia)
Fondamenta del Vin	Rio di San Salvador
Fondamenta del Vin	Palazzo Bembo
Fondamenta del Vin	Traghetto Rialto
Traghetto San Silvestro	Ca' Loredan (City Hall)
Casa Ravà	Ca' Farsetti (City Hall)
San Silvestro vaporetto station	Palazzo Cavalli (or Palazzo Corner Martinengo)
Palazzo Barzizza	Palazzo Corner Valmarana
Palazzo Giustinian Businello	Palazzo Grimani di San Luca (Appellate court)
Rio dei Meloni	Rio di San Luca
Palazzo Papadopoli	Palazzo Corner Contarini dei Cavalli
Palazzo Papadopoli	Palazzo Tron
Palazzo Donà	Palazzo D'Anna Viaro Martinengo Volpi di Misurata
Palazzo Donà della Madoneta
Rio della Madoneta	Palazzo Querini Benzon
Palazzo Bernardo a San Polo	Rio di Ca' Michiel
Palazzo Querini Dubois	Palazzo Curti Valmarana
Palazzo Grimani Marcello	Palazzo Corner Spinelli
Ca' Cappello Layard	Sant'Angelo vaporetto station
Rio di San Polo	Casa Barocci
Palazzo Barbarigo della Terrazza	Rio di Ca' Garzoni
Palazzo Pisani Moretta	Palazzo Garzoni
Palazzo Tiepolo	Traghetto Garzoni
Palazzo Tiepolo Passi	Fondaco Marcello
Palazzo Giustinian Persico	Palazzo Corner Gheltoff
	Palazzo Mocenigo#1
Rio di San Tomà	Palazzo Mocenigo#2
	Palazzo Mocenigo#3
Traghetto San Tomà
Palazzo Marcello dei Leoni
Palazzo Dolfin
San Tomà/Frari vaporetto station
Palazzo Dandolo Paolucci
Palazzo Civran Grimani
Rio della Frescada	Palazzo Contarini delle Figure
Palazzo Caotorta-Angaran	Palazzo Contarini delle Figure
Palazzo Balbi (Government of Veneto)	Palazzo Erizzo Nani Mocenigo
Rio di Ca' Foscari
Ca' Foscari (University of Venice)	Palazzo Da Lezze
Palazzi Giustinian	Palazzo Moro-Lin
Ca' Bernardo	Palazzo Moro-Lin
Palazzo Bernardo Nani	Palazzo Grassi
Ca' Rezzonico (Museum of 18th-century Venice)	Palazzo Grassi
Rio di San Barnaba	San Samuele
Palazzo Contarini Michiel	San Samuele vaporetto station
Ca' Rezzonico vaporetto station	Casa Franceschinis
Traghetto San Barnaba	Traghetto San Samuele
Palazzetto Stern	Palazzo Malipiero
Rio Malpaga	Palazzo Malipiero
Palazzo Moro
Palazzo Loredan dell'Ambasciatore
Casa Mainella
Rio di San Trovaso
Palazzi Contarini degli Scrigni and Corfù	Ca' del Duca
Palazzi Contarini degli Scrigni and Corfù	Rio del Duca
Palazzi Contarini degli Scrigni and Corfù	Palazzo Falier Canossa
Palazzo Mocenigo Gambara	Palazzo Giustinian Lolin
Palazzo Querini Vianello	Palazzo Giustinian Lolin
Scuola Grande di Santa Maria della Carità (Gallerie dell'Accademia)	Palazzo Civran Badoer Barozzi
Accademia vaporetto station	Rio di San Vidal
Santa Maria della Carità (Gallery of Accademia museum)	Campo San Vidal
Ponte dell'Accademia
Palazzo Brandolin Rota	Palazzo Cavalli-Franchetti (Istituto Veneto di Scienze, Lettere ed Arti)
Palazzo Contarini Dal Zaffo	Palazzo Cavalli-Franchetti (Istituto Veneto di Scienze, Lettere ed Arti)
Palazzo Balbi Valier	Palazzi Barbaro
Palazzo Loredan-Cini	Palazzo Benzon Foscolo
Rio di San Vio	Palazzetto Pisani
Campo San Vio	Rio del Santissimo
Palazzo Barbarigo	Palazzo Succi
Palazzo Da Mula	Casa Stecchini
Palazzo Centani Morosini
Ca' Biondetti	Casina delle Rose
Palazzo Venier dei Leoni (Peggy Guggenheim Collection)	Palazzo Corner della Ca' Grande (Province of Venice Prefecture)
Casa Artom
Rio delle Torreselle	Rio di San Maurizio
Palazzo Dario	Palazzo Barbarigo Minotto
Palazzo Barbaro Wolkoff	Palazzo Barbarigo
Rio della Fornace	Rio di Santa Maria Zobenigo
Palazzo Salviati	Santa Maria del Giglio vaporetto station
Palazzo Orio Semitecolo Benzon	Palazzo Venier Contarini
Traghetto San Gregorio	Traghetto Santa Maria del Giglio
Casa Santomaso	Palazzo Pisani Gritti
Palazzo Genovese	Rio delle Ostreghe
San Gregorio ex-abbey	Palazzo Ferro Fini (Regional Council of Veneto)
Rio della Salute	Palazzo Ferro Fini (Regional Council of Veneto)
Salute vaporetto station	Palazzo Contarini Fasan
Basilica di Santa Maria della Salute	Palazzo Contarini
Basilica di Santa Maria della Salute	Palazzo Michiel Alvise
Patriarchal Seminary	Palazzo Badoer Tiepolo
Punta della Dogana	Palazzo Barozzi Emo Treves de Bonfili
Punta della Dogana	Rio di San Moisè
Punta della Dogana	Hotel Bauer
Punta della Dogana	Ca' Giustinian (municipal Venice Biennale offices, former Hotel Europa)
	Palazzo Vallaresso Erizzo (Hotel Monaco)
	Harry's Bar
	San Marco/Vallaresso vaporetto station
	Fonteghetto della Farina
	Venice Pavilion
