= Index of Republic of Venice-related articles =

This is an alphabetical index of people, places, things, and concepts related to or originating from the Republic of Venice (AD 697–1797). Feel free to add more, and create missing pages.

== A ==
- Accademia degli Incogniti
- Accademia Veneziana
- Agnadello, Battle of
- Archipelago, Duchy of the
- Venetian Albania
- Albanian–Venetian War
- Aquileia
- Anafesto, Paolo Lucio
- Angelokastro (Corfu)
- Antenori, Obelerio degli
- Santi Apostoli, Venice
- Army of the Republic of Venice
- Venetian Arsenal
- Avogadoria de Comùn

== B ==
- Bagnolo, Treaty of
- Bailo
- Bailo of Constantinople
- Bailo of Corfu
- Bailo of Negroponte
- Barbaro, Marcantonio
- Barbaro, Francesco
- Barbo, Pantaleone
- Barozzi family
  - Barozzi, Andrea
  - Barozzi, Andrea II
  - Barozzi, Angelo
  - Barozzi, Elena
  - Barozzi, Francesco
  - Barozzi, Francesco
  - Barozzi, Giovanni
  - Barozzi, Iacopo
  - Barozzi, Iacopo II
  - Barozzi, Pietro
- Bassano, Jacopo
- Bellini, Gentile
- Bellini, Giovanni
- Bellini, Jacopo
- Bembo, Marco
- Bergamo
- Biblioteca Marciana
- Bourtzi Castle
- Bragadin, Marco Antonio
- Brescia
- Bucentaur
- Byzantine civil war of 1341–1347
- Byzantine civil war of 1373–1379

== C ==
- Camerlenghi di Comun
- Campo Formio, Treaty of
- Candia, Kingdom of
- Candiano, Pietro I
- Candiano, Pietro II
- Candiano, Pietro III
- Candiano, Pietro IV
- Candiano, Vitale
- Cappello, Girolamo
- Capitano delle Navi
- Capitano Straordinario delle Navi
- Captain General of the Sea
- Captain of the Gulf
- Carmini
- Carnival of Venice
- Ca' Tron
- Ca' Vendramin Calergi
- Censori
- Ceparius, Jovian
- Cephalonia
- Chioggia, Battle of
- Chronicon Altinate
- Chronicon Venetum et Gradense
- Cicogna, Pasquale
- Cinque savi alla mercanzia
- San Clemente, Venice
- Codex Baroccianus
- Coinage of the Republic of Venice
- Commune of Venice
- Concio
- Constantinople
- Constantinople, 1454 Treaty of
- Constantinople, 1479 Treaty of
- Contarini, Alvise (Diplomat)
- Contarini, Francesco
- Corfu
- Cornaro (Corner) family
  - Cornaro, Andrea (Marquess of Bodonitsa)
  - Cornaro, Catherine
  - Cornaro, Federico, died 1382
  - Cornaro, Federico, died 1590
  - Cornaro, Federico Baldissera Bartolomeo
  - Cornaro, Felicia
  - Cornaro, Francesco (Doge)
  - Cornaro, Giorgio
  - Cornaro, Giovanni I
  - Cornaro, Giovanni II
  - Cornaro, Girolamo
  - Cornaro, Laura
  - Cornaro, Marco (Doge)
  - Cornaro, Marco (1406–1479)
  - Cornaro, Pietro
- Cornicola, Felice
- Corona-class ship of the line
- Correr family
  - Correr, Pietro, Latin Patriarch of Constantinople
- Cremona
- Cremona, 1270 Peace of
- Cremona, 1441 Peace of
- Cretan War (1645–1669)
- Crete (Candia)
- Crete, List of rulers of
- Croatian–Venetian wars
- Cyprus under Venetian rule

== D ==
- Dalmatia under Venetian rule
- Dandolo family
  - Dandolo, Andrea (Doge)
  - Dandolo, Andrea (Admiral)
  - Dandolo, Anna
  - Dandolo, Enrico
  - Dandolo, Francesco
  - Dandolo, Giovanna
  - Dandolo, Giovanni
  - Dondulo, Jacopo
  - Dandolo, Marino
  - Dandolo, Raniero
  - Dandolo, Zilia
- Diedo, Marcantonio
- Dogado
- Dogaressa
- Doge
- Doge of Venice
- Dolfin or Delfin family
  - Dolfin, Caterina
  - Dolfin, Dolfin
  - Dolfin, Giovanni
  - Dolfin, Giovanni, bishop of Brescia
- Donato, Girolamo
- Dubrovnik

== E ==
- Economic history of Venice
- Esecutori contro la bestemmia

== F ==
- Fabriacus, John
- Faliero, Marino
- Fall of the Republic of Venice
- Flag of the Republic of Venice
- Flanginian School
- Fondaco dei Tedeschi
- Fondaco dei Turchi
- Council of Forty
- Foscari, Alvise
- Francesco's Mediterranean Voyage
- Full College

== G ==
- Galbaio, Giovanni
- Galbaio, Maurizio
- Galeas per montes
- Gallipoli, Treaty of
- San Giorgio dei Greci
- Giorgione
- Giove Fulminante-class ship of the line
- Giustiniani family
  - Giustinian, Pantaleone
  - Giustiniani, Pompeo
- Pietro Gradenigo
- Grimani family
  - Grimani, Antonio
  - Grimani, Domenico
  - Grimani, Marino (doge)
  - Grimani, Marino (cardinal)
  - Grimani, Pietro
- Glass manufacture in Venice
- Gothic architecture in Venice
- Governatore dei condannati
- Great Council of Venice
- Great Turkish War
- Greek community in Venice
- Gritti, Alvise

== H ==
- History of the Republic of Venice
- A History of Venice

== I ==
- Inquisistion in the Republic of Venice
- Intercursus Magnus
- Ionian Islands under Venetian rule
- Ipato, Orso
- Ipato, Teodato
- Istria under Venetian rule
- Italian War of 1494–1498
- Italian War of 1521–1526
- Italian Wars of 1499–1504
- Italic League

== K ==
- Karlowitz, Treaty of
- Kassiopi Castle
- Koroni (Coron)
- Kotor (Cattaro)
  - Fortifications of Kotor
- Kythira (Cerigo)

== L ==
- La Motta, 1513 Battle of
- Lando, Pietro
- Lefkada (Santa Maura)
- Leoben, Treaty of
- Leoni, Domenico
- Leon Trionfante-class ship of the line
- Loredan family
  - Loredan, Alvise
  - Loredan, Andrea (Admiral)
  - Loredan, Antonio
  - Loredan, Caterina
  - Loredan, Francesco
  - Loredan, Giorgio
  - Loredan, Giovanni
  - Loredan, Giovanni (Lord of Antiparos)
  - Loredan, Leonardo
  - Loredan, Marco
  - Loredan, Pietro
  - Loredan, Pietro (Doge)
  - Loredan, Zanotto
  - Loredan, Giovanni Francesco
  - Loredano, Paolina
- Lords of the Night (Venice)
- Lotto, Lorenzo
- Luogotenente

== M ==
- Madrid, 1617 treaty of
- Magistrato alle Acque
- Magistrato alle Pompe
- Magistrato alla Sanità
- Malipiero, Pasquale
- Manin, Ludovico
- Marcello, Lorenzo
- Marcello, Nicolò
- Santa Maria degli Angeli, Murano
- Santa Maria dei Derelitti
- Santa Maria Formosa
- Santa Maria Mater Domini
- Marin Bocconio
- Marriage of the Sea ceremony
- San Martino, Venice
- Memmo, Tribuno
- Methoni Castle
- San Michele in Isola
- Milanese War of Succession
- Military history of the Republic of Venice
- Minor Council
- Mocenigo family
  - Mocenigo, Andrea
  - Mocenigo, Alvise I
  - Mocenigo, Alvise II
  - Mocenigo, Giovanni
  - Mocenigo, Lazzaro
  - Mocenigo, Pietro
  - Mocenigo, Sebastiano
  - Mocenigo, Tommaso
- Modon, 1403 Battle of
- Monegario, Domenico
- More veneto
- Morea, Kingdom of the
- Morean War
- Morlachs (Venetian irregulars)
- Moro, Cristoforo
- Morosini family
  - Morosini, Aliodea
  - Morosini, Domenico
  - Morosini, Giovan Francesco (Cardinal)
  - Morosini, Giovan Francesco (Patriarch of Venice)
  - Morosini, Francesco
  - Morosini, John
  - Morosini, Lodovico
  - Morosini, Marino
  - Morosini, Michele
  - Morosini, Morosina
  - Morosini, Tomasina
- Miglani, Nicolò
- Muda (convoy)

== N ==
- Nani, Giovan Battista
- Navigajoso, Nicolò
- Navy of the Republic of Venice
- Negroponte, Triarchy of
- New Fortress
- Nobility of the Republic of Venice
- Nymphaeum, 1261 Treaty of

== O ==
- Ognissanti, Venice
- Old Fortress, Corfu
- Order of Saint Mark
- Orseolo, Otto
- Orseolo, Pietro I
- Orseolo, Pietro II
- Orvieto, Treaty of
- Ottoman–Venetian War (1463–1479)
- Ottoman–Venetian War (1499–1503)
- Ottoman–Venetian War (1537–1540)
- Ottoman–Venetian War (1570–1573)
- Ottoman–Venetian War (1714–1718)

== P ==
- Pactum Lotharii
- Pactum Warmundi
- Padua
- Padua, 1509 Siege of
- Padua, War of
- Palamidi
- Palazzo Adoldo
- Palazzo Balbi, Venice
- Palazzo Barbarigo
- Palazzo Barbarigo della Terrazza
- Palazzo Bernardo Nani
- Palazzo Boldù a San Felice
- Palazzo Bonfadini Vivante
- Palazzo Brandolin Rota
- Palazzo Caotorta-Angaran
- Palazzo Contarini Dal Zaffo
- Palazzo Contarini delle Figure
- Palazzo Corner della Ca' Grande
- Palazzo Corner Spinelli
- Palazzo Correr Contarini Zorzi
- Palazzo Curti Valmarana
- Palazzo D'Anna Viaro Martinengo Volpi di Misurata
- Palazzo Dandolo Paolucci
- Palazzo dei Camerlenghi
- Palazzo dei Dieci Savi
- Palazzo Dolfin Manin
- Palazzo Donà Balbi
- Palazzo Giustinian Persico
- Palazzo Giustinian Recanati
- Palazzo Grimani di Santa Maria Formosa
- Palazzo Grimani Marcello
- Palazzo Gritti
- Palazzo Gussoni Grimani Della Vida
- Palazzo Malipiero-Trevisan
- Palazzo Molina, Venice
- Palazzo Nani
- Palazzo Querini Benzon
- Palazzo Querini Dubois
- Palazzo Soranzo Piovene
- Palazzo Tiepolo
- Palazzo Zorzi Galeoni
- Palma il Giovane
- Palma Vecchio
- Parga Castle
- Paris, 1623 Treaty of
- Partitio terrarum imperii Romaniae
- Participazio, Agnello
- Participazio, Giovanni I
- Participazio, Giovanni II
- Participazio, Giustiniano
- Participazio, Orso I
- Participazio, Orso II
- Participazio, Pietro
- Passarowitz, Treaty of
- Patras
- Patria del Friuli
- Patriarchate of Venice
- Pax Alexii Callergi
- Pax Nicephori
- Pesaro, Benedetto
- Piazza San Marco
- Pisani, Andrea (Admiral)
- Domenico Pisani
- Pisani, Vettor
- di Pitigliano, Niccolò
- Polesella, Battle of
- da Polenta, Obizzo
- da Polenta, Ostasio III
- Portrait of Doge Leonardo Loredan
- Procuratie
- Procurators of Saint Mark
- Promissione ducale
- Provveditore
- Provveditore all'Armata
- Provveditore Generale da Mar

== R ==
- Ravenna
- Relazione
- Renaissance in Venice
  - Renaissance architecture in Venice
- Renier, Paolo
- Republic of Venice
- Rethymno (Retimo)
- Riformatori dello studio di Padova
- Riva degli Schiavoni
- Roccafortis
- Ruzzini, Carlo

== S ==
- San Carlo Borromeo-class ship of the line
- San Lorenzo Zustinian-class ship of the line
- Sanudo family
  - Sanudo, Angelo
  - Sanudo, Cristina
  - Sanudo, Florence
  - Sanudo, John I
  - Sanudo, Marco I
  - Sanudo, Marco II
  - Sanudo, Marco, lord of Gridi
  - Sanudo, Marco, lord of Milos
  - Sanudo, Maria
  - Sanudo, Nicholas I
  - Sanudo, Nicholas II
  - Sanudo, William I
- Sapienza, Battle of
- Sapienza, Treaty of
- Saseno, Battle of
- Savi agli Ordini
- Savi del Consiglio
- Savi di Terraferma
  - Savio ai Ceremoniali
  - Savio ai da mò
  - Savio alla Scrittura
  - Savio alle Ordinanze
  - Savio Cassier
- Schiavone
- Schiavonesca
- Scuola dei Greci
- Scuola di San Giorgio degli Schiavoni
- Scuole Grandi of Venice
- Sebastiano del Piombo
- Selymbria, Treaty of
- Senate of Venice
- Serrata del Maggior Consiglio
- Sestiere (Venice)
- Settepozzi, Battle of
- Shkodër
- Šibenik (Sebenico)
- Signoria of Venice
- Sopracomito
- Stato da Màr
- Steno, Michele
- Stratioti
- Sveti Srdj, Treaty of

== T ==
- Tegalliano, Marcello
- Council of Ten
- Terraferma, Dominions of the
- Timeline of the Republic of Venice
- Thessalonica
- Thessalonica, 1422–1430 Siege of
- Tiepolo, Jacopo
- Tiepolo, Lorenzo
- Tintoretto
- Titian
- Tradonico, Pietro
- Trapani, Battle of
- Turin, 1381 Treaty of
- Treaty with Byzantium, 1082
- Treaty with Byzantium, 1277
- Treaty with Byzantium, 1268
- Treaty with Nicaea, 1219
- Treaty with the Ottoman Empire, 1419
- Treviso
- Tribuno, Pietro

== U ==
- Udine
- Uskoks

== V ==
- Valdrada of Sicily
- Valier, Silvestro
- Vendramin family
  - Vendramin, Andrea
- Venetian bombardments of the Beylik of Tunis (1784–1788)
- Venetian Ghetto
- Venetian School (music)
- Venetian school (art)
- Venetian Works of Defence between the 16th and 17th centuries: Stato da Terra – Western Stato da Mar
- Venice
- Venier family
  - Venier, Andrea
  - Venier, Antonio
  - Venier, Francesco
  - Venier, Pietro, governor of Cerigo
  - Venier, Sebastiano
- Verona
- Veronese Easter
- Veronese, Paolo
- Vetrego
- Via Argentaria
- Via de Zenta
- Vicenza
- Vitus of Kotor

== W ==
- War of the Euboeote Succession
- War of Saint Sabas
- War with Byzantium (1171)
- War with Byzantium (1296–1302)
- Wars with Genoa
- Wars with the Ottoman Empire
- Widmann, Carlo Aurelio

== Z ==
- San Zaccaria, Venice
- Zadar (Zara)
- Zadar, Treaty of
- Zakynthos (Zante)
- Zane, Girolamo
- Zane, Matteo
- Zecca of Venice
- Zeno, Carlo
- Zeno, Pietro (died 1345)
- Zeno, Pietro
- Zeno, Reniero
- Zorzi family
  - Zorzi, Bertolome
  - Zorzi, Marino
  - Zorzi, Marsilio
- Le Zitelle
- Zulian family
  - Zulian, Girolamo
  - Zuliani, Polo

== See also ==
- Index of Italy-related articles
