= Palazzo Giustinian Persico =

Building in Venice, Italy

Coordinates: 45°26′08″N 12°19′43″E

The Palazzo Giustinian Persico is an early-Renaissance-style palace located at the corner with the Rio di San Tomà, near Palazzo Tiepolo and across the canal from Palazzi Mocenigo on the Grand Canal, in the Sestiere of San Polo, Venice, Italy.

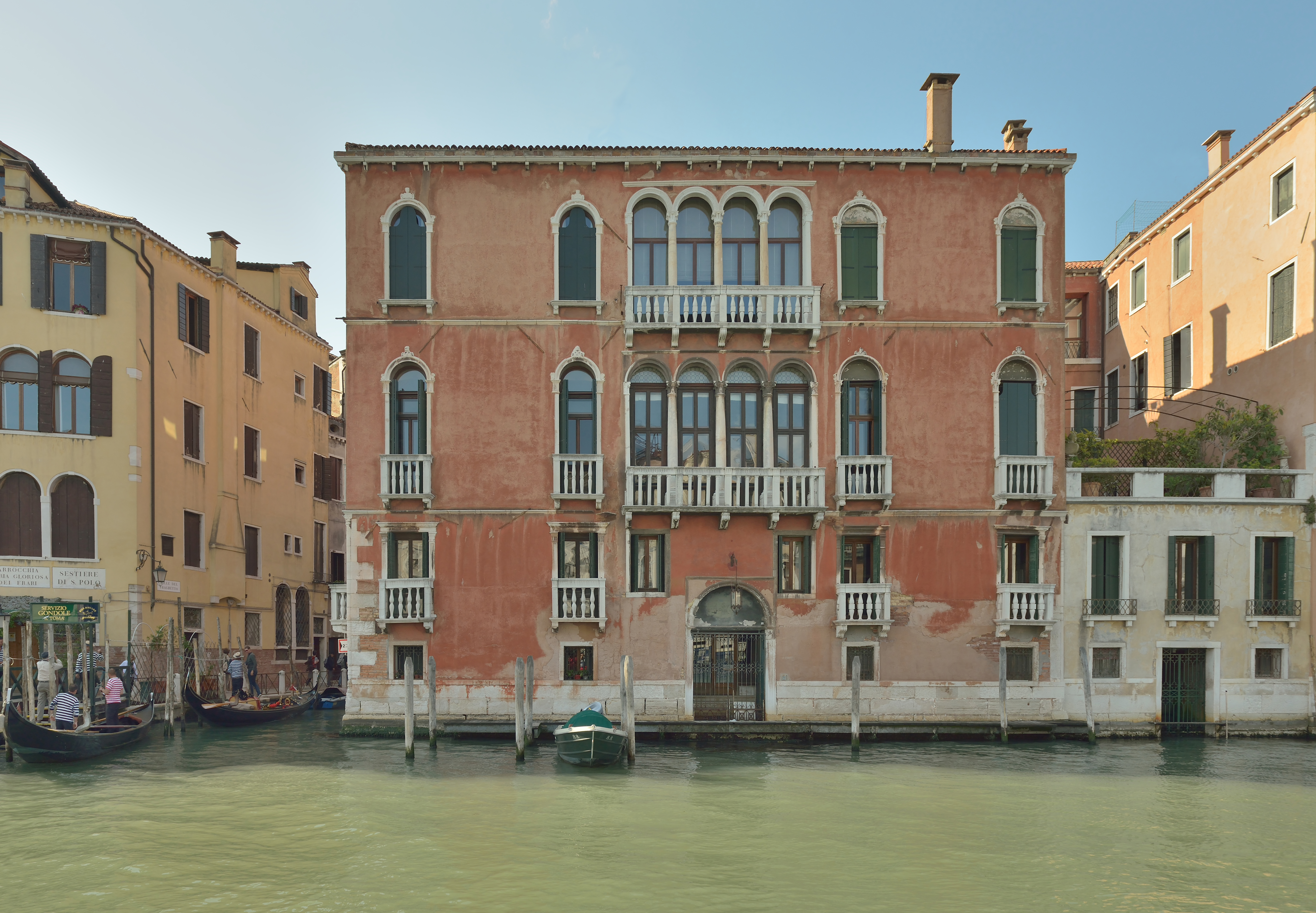
Palazzo Giustinian Persico

== History ==
The palace was commissioned in the 13th century by the aristocratic Giustinian family, but later transferred to the Persico family. The facade, built in the 16th century, resembles that of buildings by Mauro Codussi.

== Bibliography ==
- Brusegan, Marcello (2007). The palaces of Venice. Rome: Newton & Compton. p. 187. ISBN 978-88-541-0820 -2. Brusegan.
