= Palazzo Ruzzini =

Coordinates: 45.4386°N 12.3365°E

The Palazzo Ruzzini is 19th-century, neoclassic-style palace located between the Rio adjacent to the Fontego dei Tedeschi and the Casa Perducci and Palazzo Civran on the Grand Canal, in the Sestiere of Cannaregio, in the city of Venice, Italy. The central part of the facade is decorated with a trifora and quadrifora.

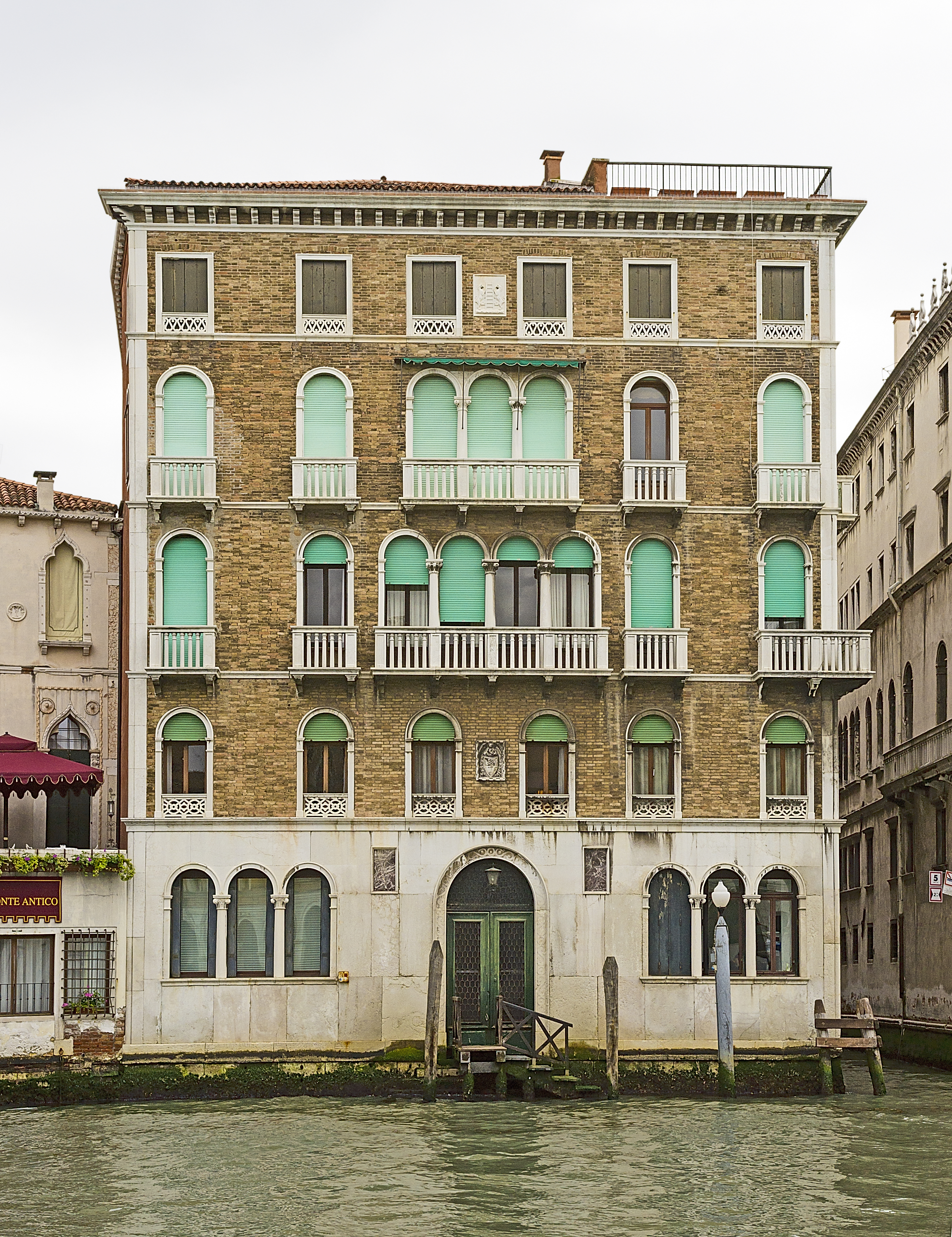
Palazzo Ruzzini

== History ==
The five-storey palace was erected in the 19th century at the site of the former Fontego dei Persiani, which was razed in 1830. The Ruzzini family was a patrician family originally emigrating from Constantinople around 1100. Marco Ruzzini was famous for defeating the Genoese in Negroponte in 1358. Carlo Ruzzini became Doge in 1732.
