= Palazzo Genovese, Venice =

Italian palace

Coordinates: 45°25′52″N 12°20′01″E

The Palazzo Genovese is a Gothic Revival-style palace located a few meters west of the Church of the Salute along the Grand Canal, the posterior facade abuts the church of San Gregorio in the Sestieri of Dorsoduro, Venice, Italy.

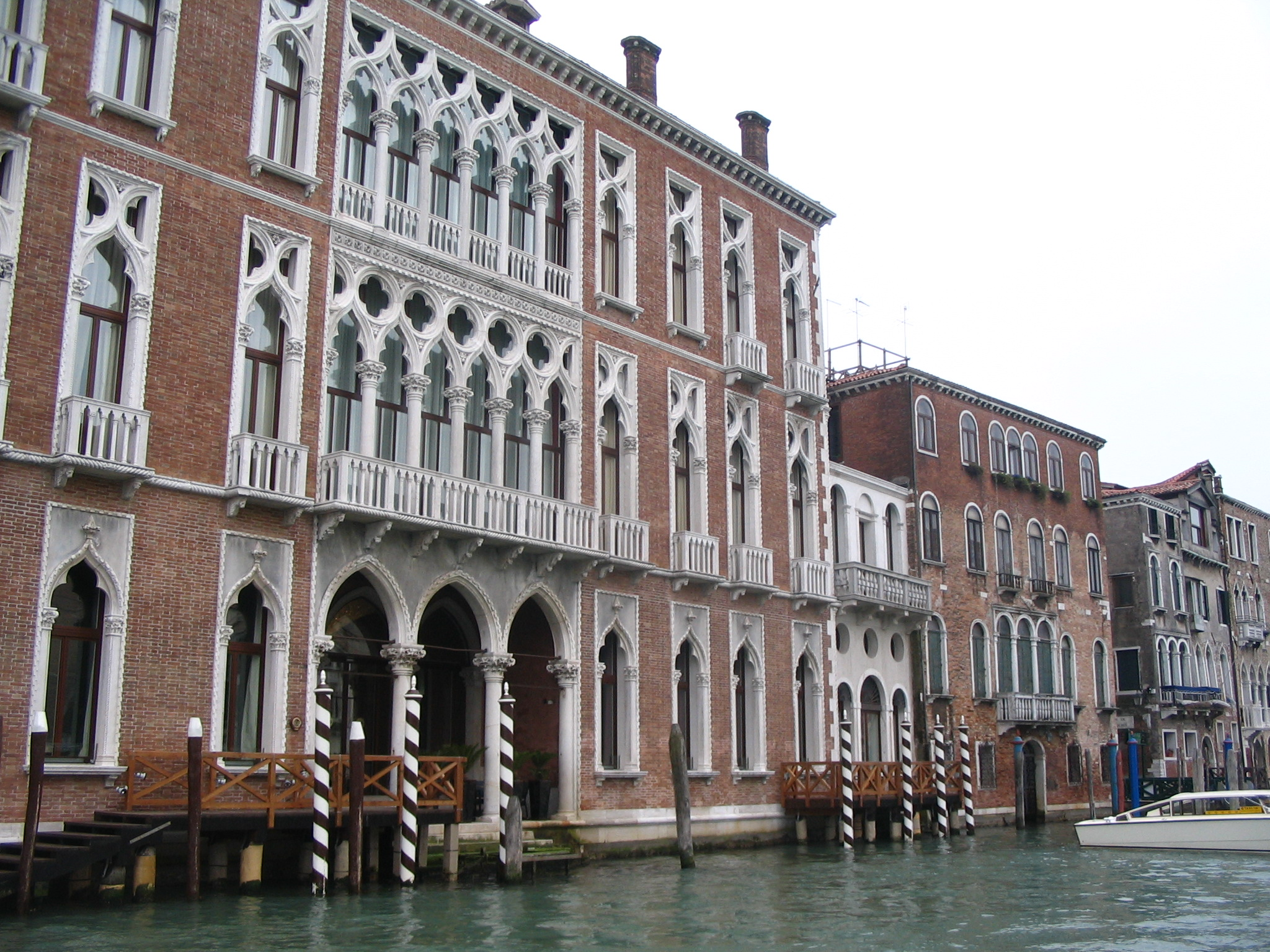
Palazzo Genovese

== History ==
The palace was commissioned in 1892 as a residence by the Genovese family and designed by the architect Edoardo Trigomi Mattei in a style faithful to the Venetian Gothic. The palace was owned by the English aristocrat James Cook. Archeologic work found evidence of 7th and 9th century buildings.

== Bibliography ==
- Marcello Brusegan,I palazzi di Venezia, Newton Compton 2007, p. 178-9.
