= Palazzo Corner Gheltof =

Coordinates: 45°26′06″N 12°19′45″E

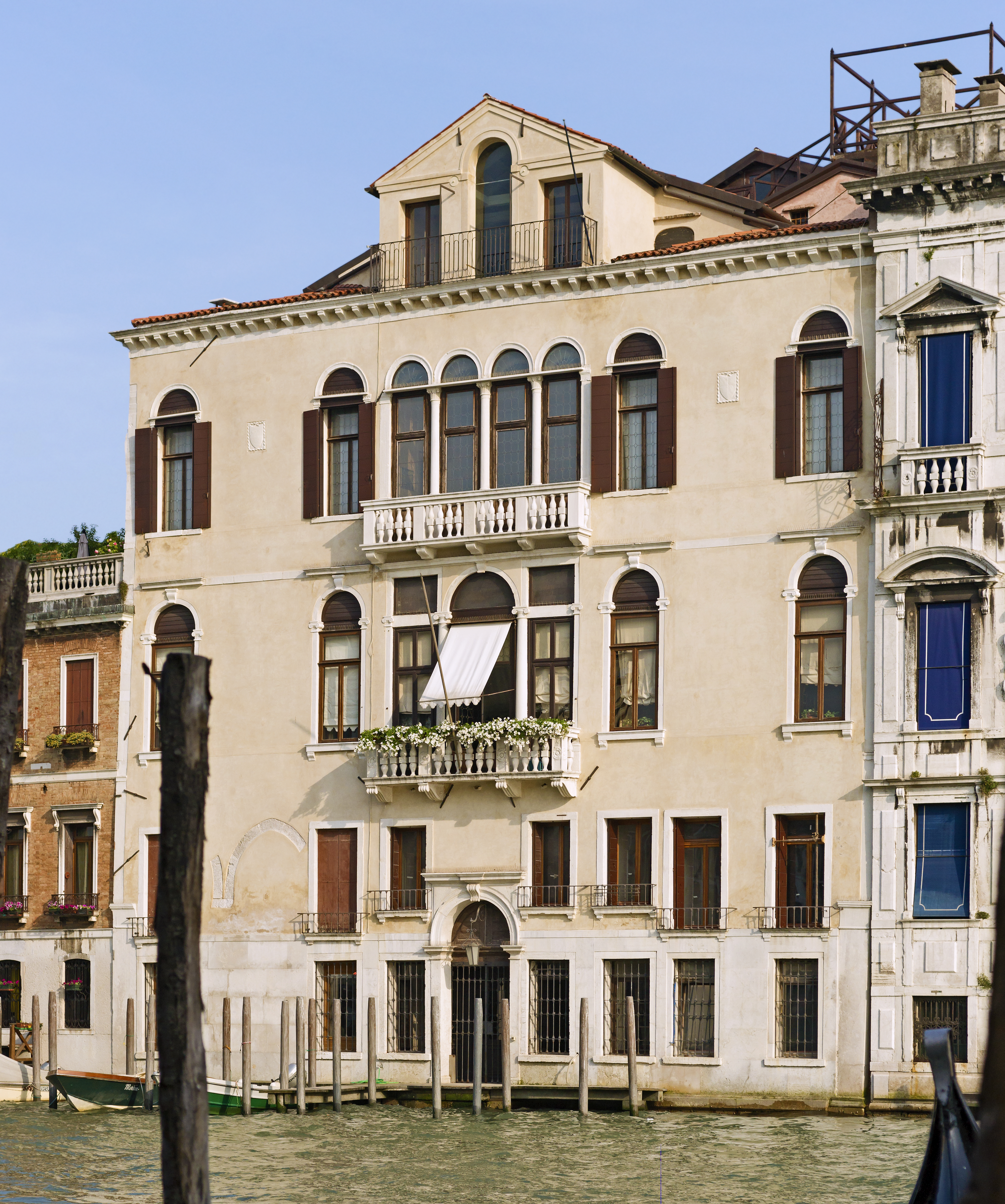
Palazzo Corner Gheltoff in Venice, facade on the Grand Canal

The Palazzo Corner Gheltof is Gothic-style palace located on the Grand Canal, in the Sestieri of San Marco, adjacent to the Palazzi Mocenigo, in Venice, Italy.

== History ==
The building has undergone a number of renovations, including a major one in the 16th century.
