= Palazzo Bernardo a San Polo =

Palace in Venice, Italy

Coordinates: 45.4364°N 12.3309°E

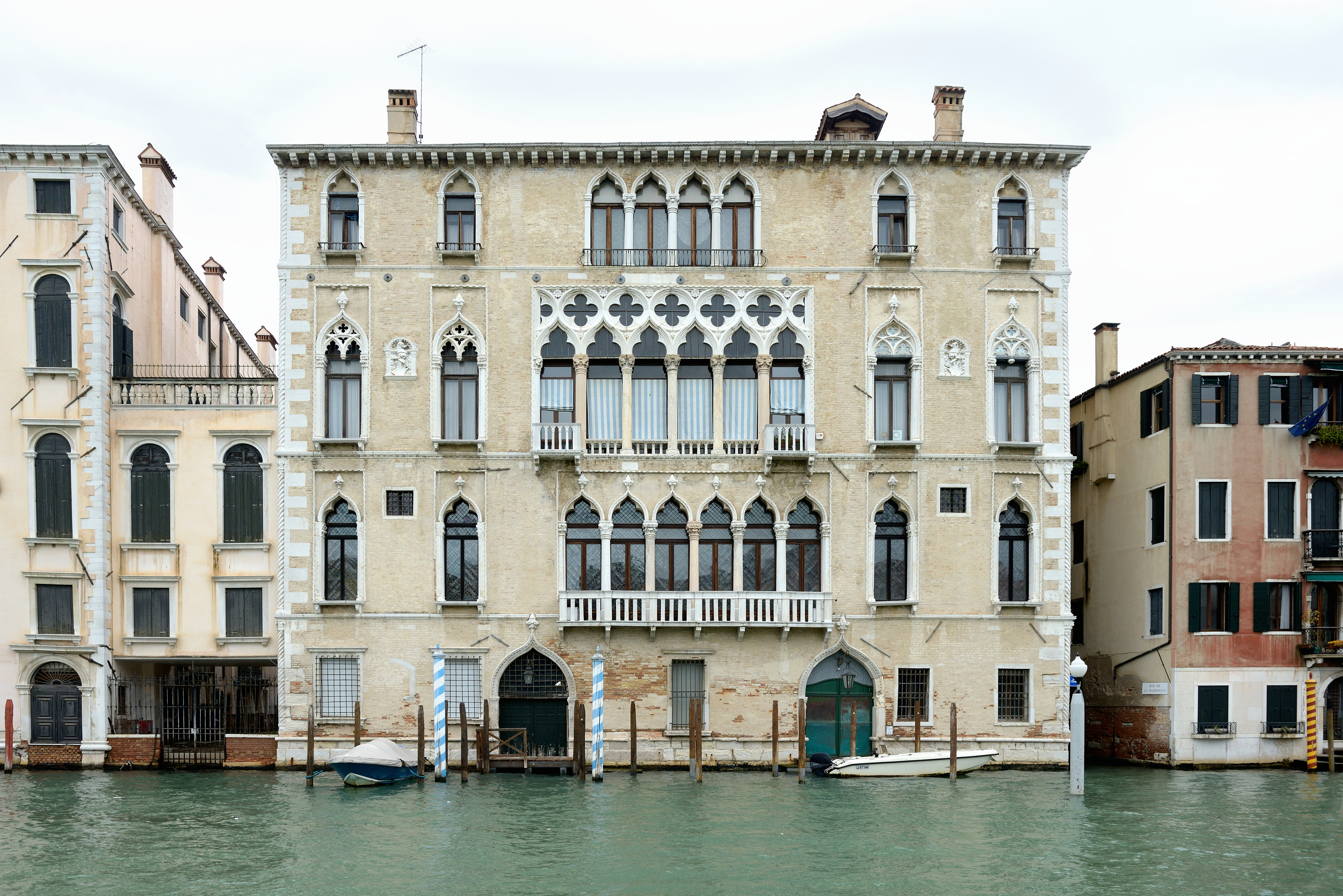
Facade

The Palazzo Bernardo a San Polo, also known as the Giustinian Bernardo, is a Gothic-style palace located between Palazzo Querini Dubois and across the Rio del la Madoneta, Casa Sicher, on the Grand Canal in the sestiere of San Polo of Venice, Italy.

== History ==
It was built in the 14th century for the Bernardo family, a patrician family from Treviso, but putatively originally from Rome. A separate Palazzo Bernardo, near the Ponte Bernardo but also in San Polo, was acquired in the 16th century by the Celsi family. At this palace were housed Francesco Sforza and his wife, Bianca Visconti, during a grand state visit to Venice in May 1442. In 1532, the palace lodged Lorenzo Strozzi, who then hosted a Medici Cardinal in a feast. The palace was in the hands of the Bernardo till 1868.
