= Palazzo Civran =

Coordinates: 45.43888°N 12.33632°E

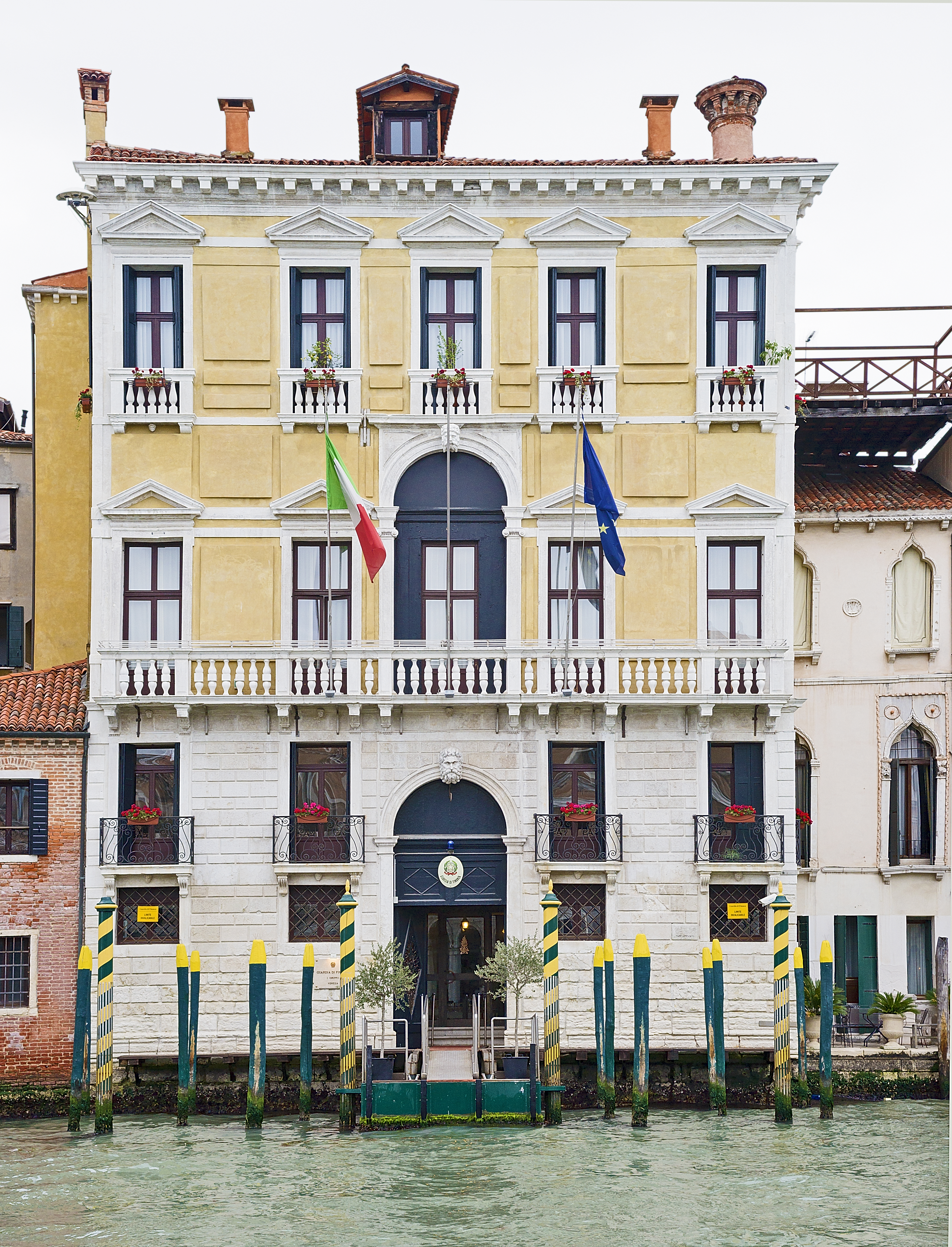
Palazzo Civran

The Palazzo Civran is a Neoclassical style palace, located between the Campiello del Remer and the smaller Palazzo Perducci on the Grand Canal in the sestiere of Cannaregio in Venice, Italy. There is a separate Palazzo Civran Grimani on the Canal.

== History ==
The palace was rebuilt circa 1700 by the architect Giorgio Massari atop an earlier Gothic structure. The palace has a long balustraded terrace along the second floor. The palace had belonged to the Civran (or Ciuran) since the 14th century, and even as late as 1797, it still belonged to Senator Piero Civran and his brother Vicenzo.

In the 19th century, it was property of Isacco Pesaro Maurogonato, a former minister of Daniele Manin. It now is home to the Guardia di Finanza.
