= Palazzo Civran Grimani =

Building in Venice, Italy

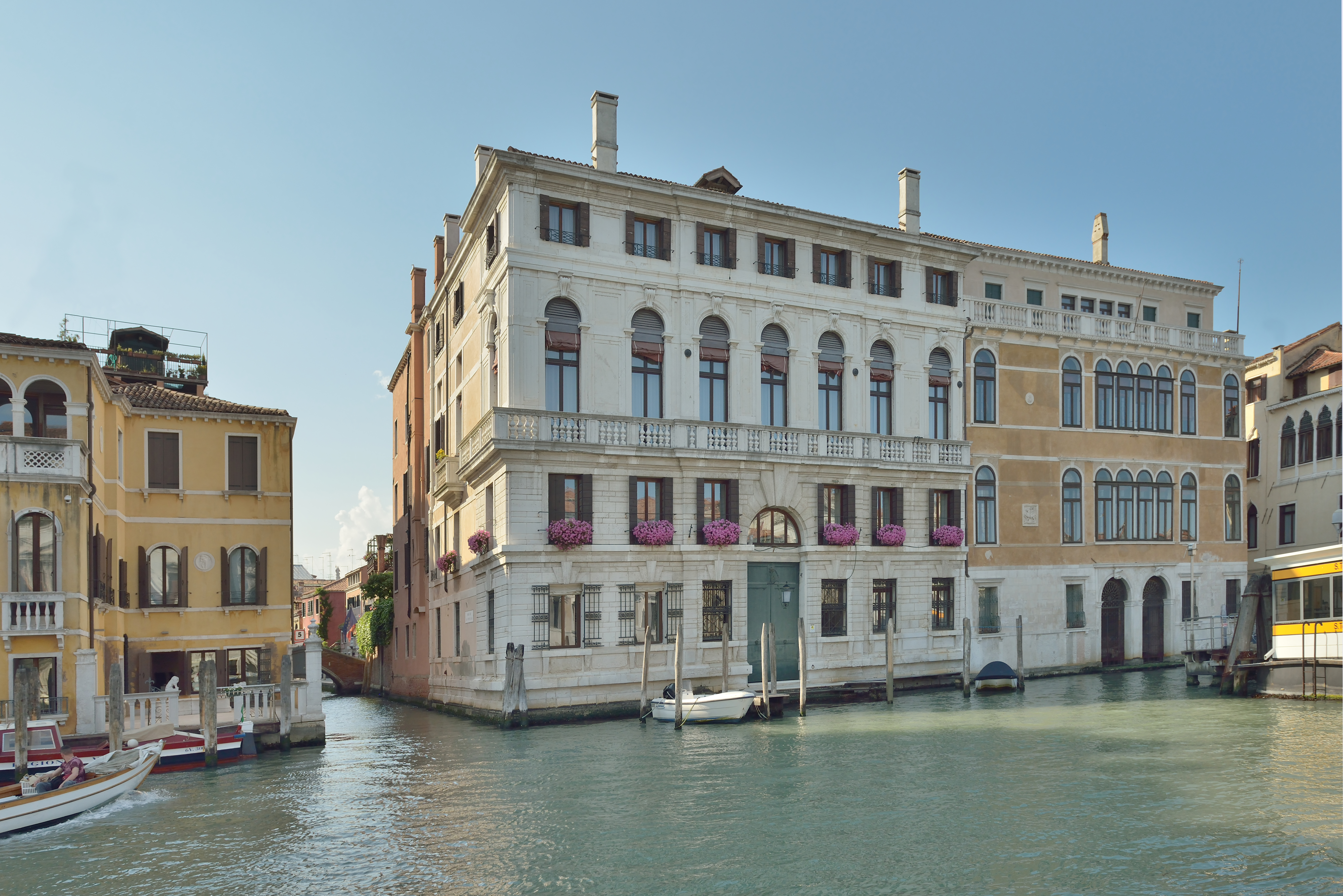
- Palazzo Civran Grimani on the Grand Canal in Venice
- Interactive map of the Palazzo Civran Grimani area

General information
- Type: Residential
- Architectural style: Neoclassical
- Location: San Polo district, Venice, Italy
- Coordinates: 45°26′07.1″N 12°19′39.02″E
- Construction started: 15th century
- Renovated: 18th century

Technical details
- Floor count: 4

Design and construction
- Architect: Giorgio Massari

Palazzo Civran Grimani is a Neoclassical palace in Venice, Italy. The palazzo is located in the San Polo district, overlooking the Grand Canal at the confluence with Rio della Frescada, between Palazzo Dandolo Paolucci and Palazzo Caotorta-Angaran.

== History ==
The present palazzo was built in the 18th century on the site of a previous Gothic building built no later than the 15th century. The palace was renovated by an unknown architect: many historians of Venetian architecture, including Elena Bassi, attribute the authorship to Giorgio Massari. In 1818, the Grimani family moved there, after having lost ownership of the palace located in the parish of San Luca, which was transferred to the state domain. The Grimanis, after having sold this mansion, bought it back and kept it until modern times. The mayor Filippo Grimani lived here between 1895 and 1916. The building has been recently renovated.

== Architecture ==
The facade is of post-Palladian style, continuing on the perpendicular side, albeit with simpler forms. The mai facade presents many of the distinctive features of the 18th-century Neoclassical architecture. The massive ground floor is very visible because of its rusticated decoration. The noble floor offers seven single-light windows and the full-length front balcony, which also continues on the side facade. Other important elements include the water portal and the string course cornices. On the back there is a large garden in an excellent state.

== Gallery ==
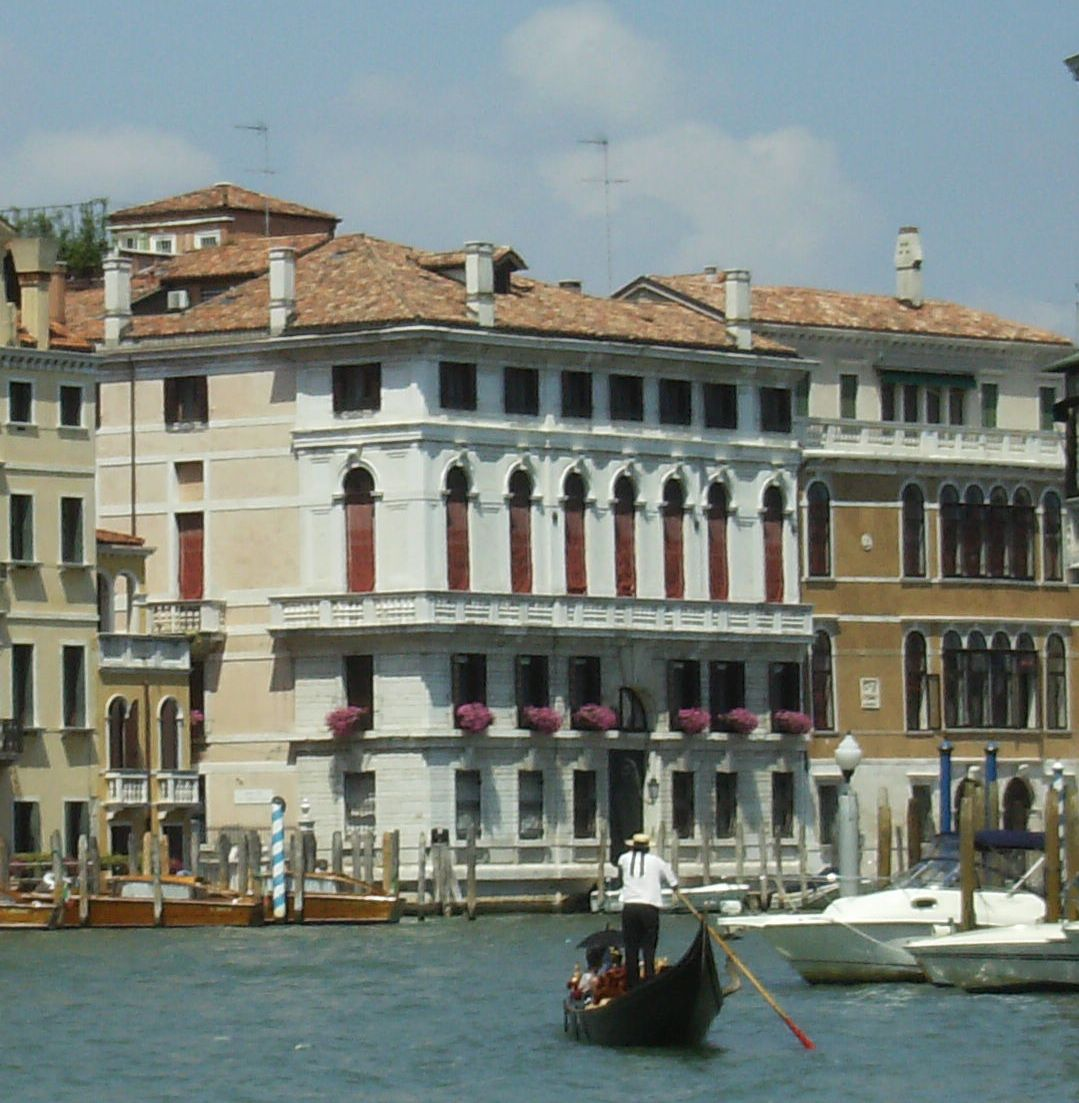
View from Grand Canal

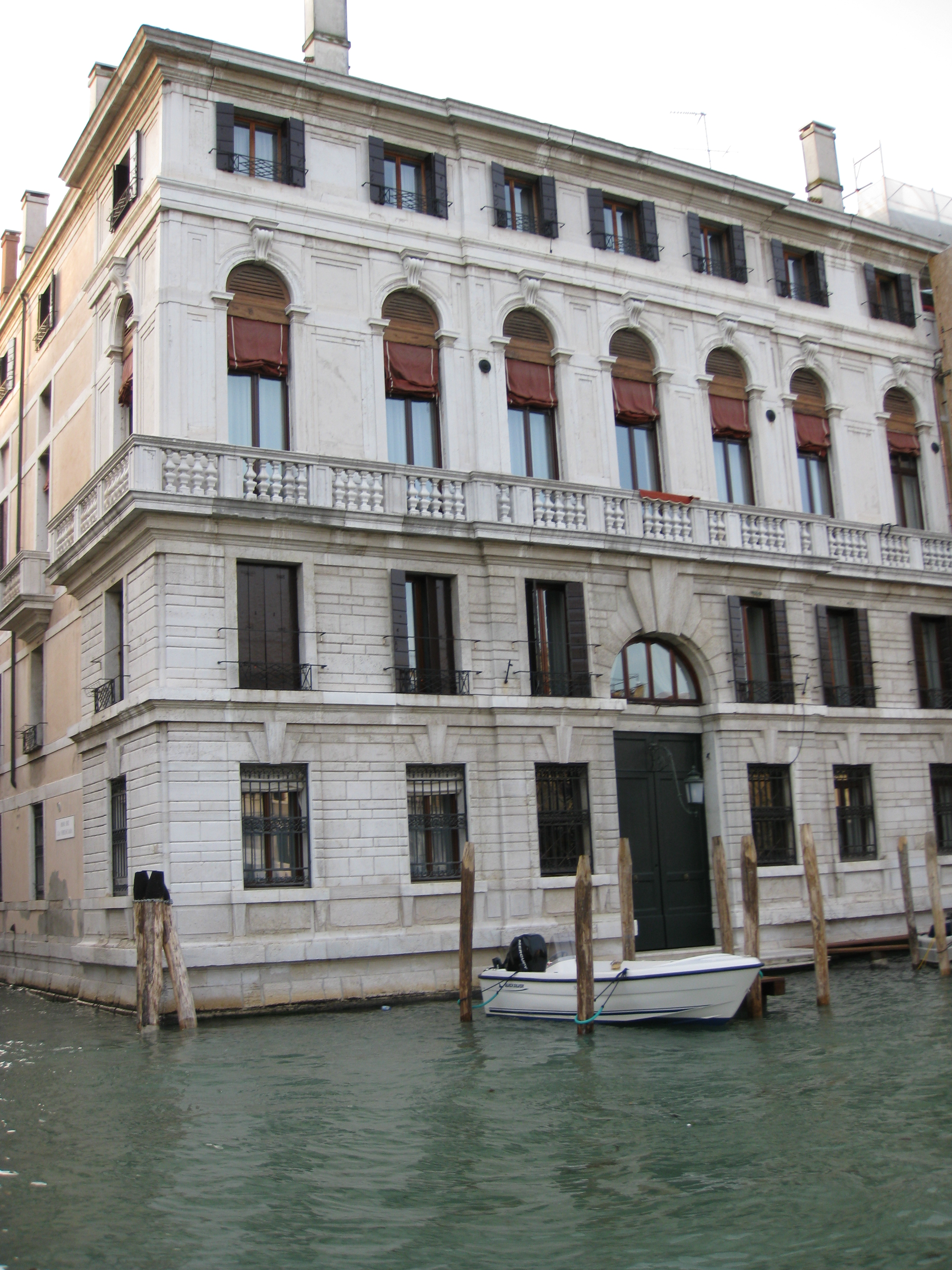
Facade details

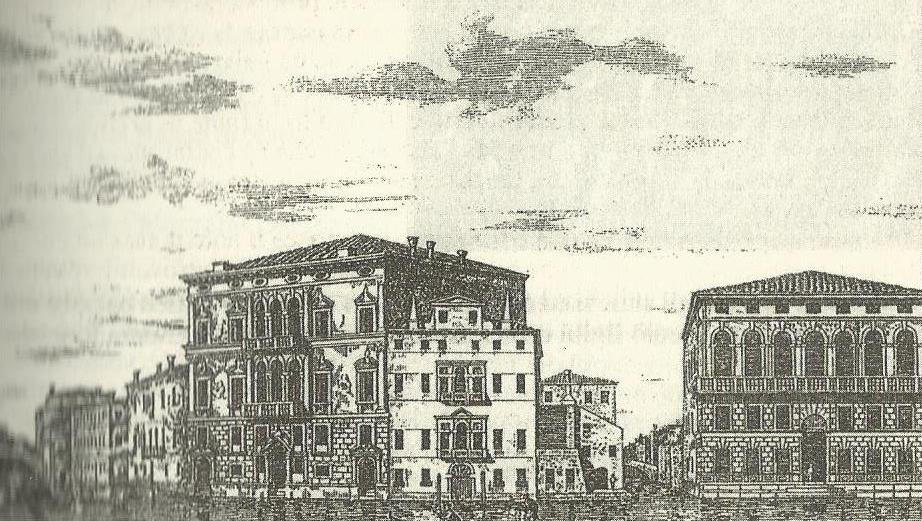
Palazzi Balbi, Caotorta, Masieri, and Civran Grimani
