= Palazzo Querini Dubois =

Palace in Venice, Italy

Coordinates: 45.4363°N 12.3306°E

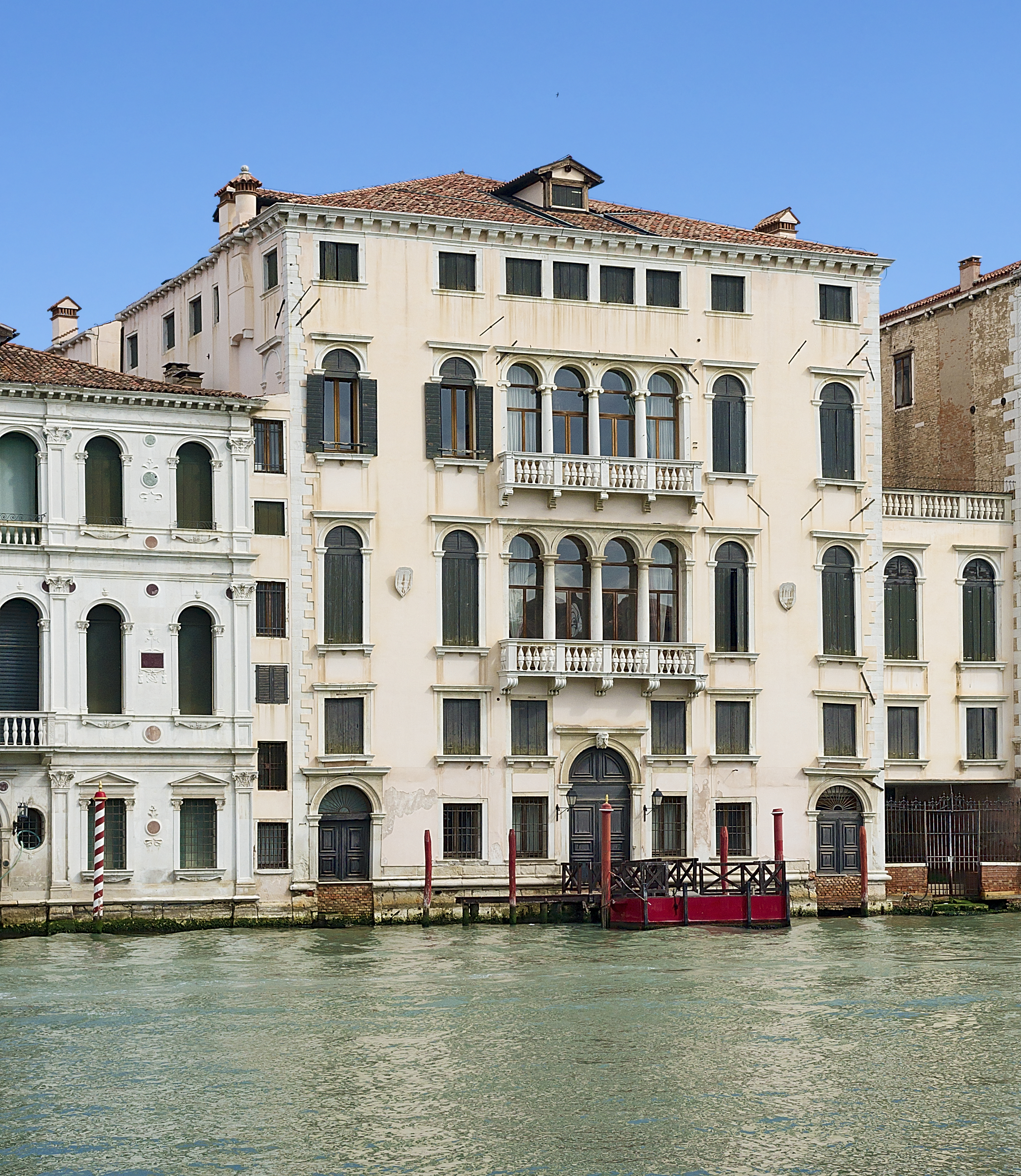
Facade

The Palazzo Querini Dubois, also known as Giustinian Querini, is a Renaissance-style palace in located on the Grand Canal, between the Palazzo Bernardo a San Polo and the Palazzo Grimani Marcello in the sestiere of San Polo of Venice, Italy. It stands across the canal from the Palazzo Corner Spinelli. A second façade faces the rio delle Erbe. Opposite is Palazzo Querini Benzon.

== History ==
A palace at the site originally belonged to Zane, then refurbished in the 17th century and housing branches of the Querini and Dona families. It was known as Palazzo Dubois, after the well-known banker who lived there in the nineteenth century. It also once served as Autrio-Hungarian consulate in late 19th and early 20th centuries.
