= Palazzo Caotorta-Angaran =

Coordinates: 45.43507°N 12.32727°E

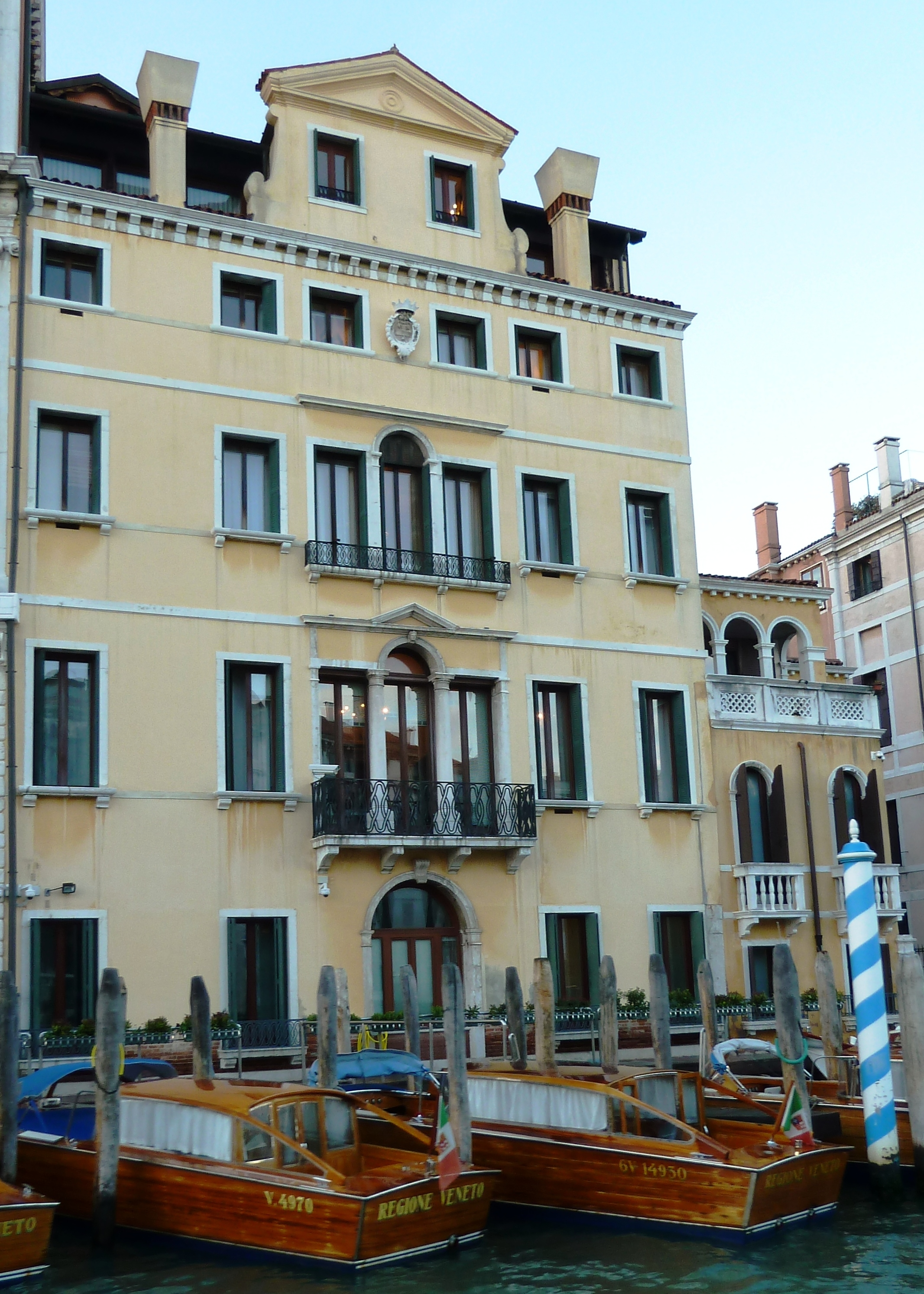
Palazzo Caotorta Angaran

The Palazzo Caotorta Angaran is a palace located on the Canal Grande of Venice, between the Palazzo Balbi and, across the Rio della Frescada, the Palazzo Civran Grimani in the Sestiere of Dorsoduro, Venice, Italy.

== History ==
The palace was initially erected in the 14th century, but underwent a near complete reconstruction in 1956 under Angelo Scattolin. The ground floor has a portal opening to the canal.
