= Palazzo Gussoni Grimani Della Vida =

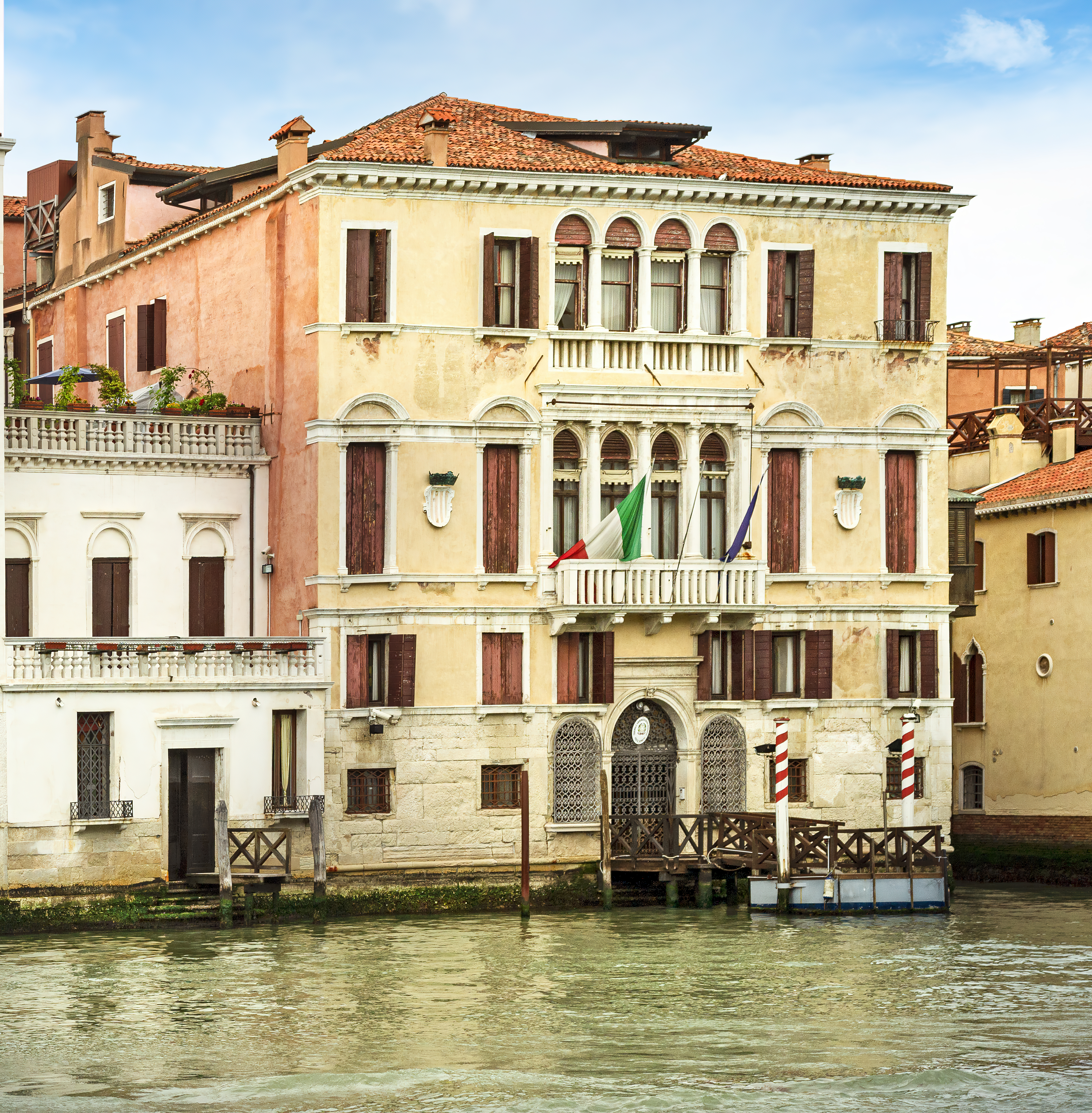
Palazzo Gussoni Grimani Della Vida

The Palazzo Gussoni Grimani Della Vida, also called Grimani a San Fosca is a Renaissance-style palace on the Grand Canal, located between the Palazetto Barbarigo and the Rio di Noale, in the sestiere of Cannaregio, in Venice, Italy.

The palace was built in the mid-16th century by a branch of the patrician Gussoni family and attributed to a design of Michele Sanmicheli. The Gussoni family is said to have played a role in the founding of Santa Sofia, San Matteo, and Santa Maria dei Crociferi. A different branch of the family lived in the Gussoni palace in San Vitale, later owned by the Cavalli.

In May 1569, the archduke Charles of Austria watched a regatta in his honor from this palace. During 1647-1690, the palace hosted the Accademia Delfica, also called Gussonia. The male Gussoni branch extinguished in 1735 with the death of the Senator Giulio. The palace briefly passed to the Minio family, who sold it to the Grimani. In 1816, it was purchased by the Jewish family Dalla Vida (Della Vida).

The courtyard had frescoes by Giovanni Battista Zelotti. The facade once had frescoes by Tintoretto depicting allegories of Dawn and Dusk.
