= Marco Loredan (11th century) =

11th-century Venetian nobleman

- Residence: Castle of Loredo, Venice
- Family: House of Loredan

Marco Loredan was an 11th-century Venetian nobleman of the Loredan family. He is possibly the oldest known ancestor of the family, besides Gaius Mucius Scaevola, who is considered the traditional progenitor of the family. According to the 16th-century Italian philosopher Jacopo Zabarella, he was the first member of the Loredan family to be ascribed to the Great Council of the Republic of Venice in 1080, due to his family's nobility, as well as for the wealth they possessed.
