= Palazzo Tiepolo =

Palace in Venice, Italy

Coordinates: 45°26′09″N 12°19′45″E

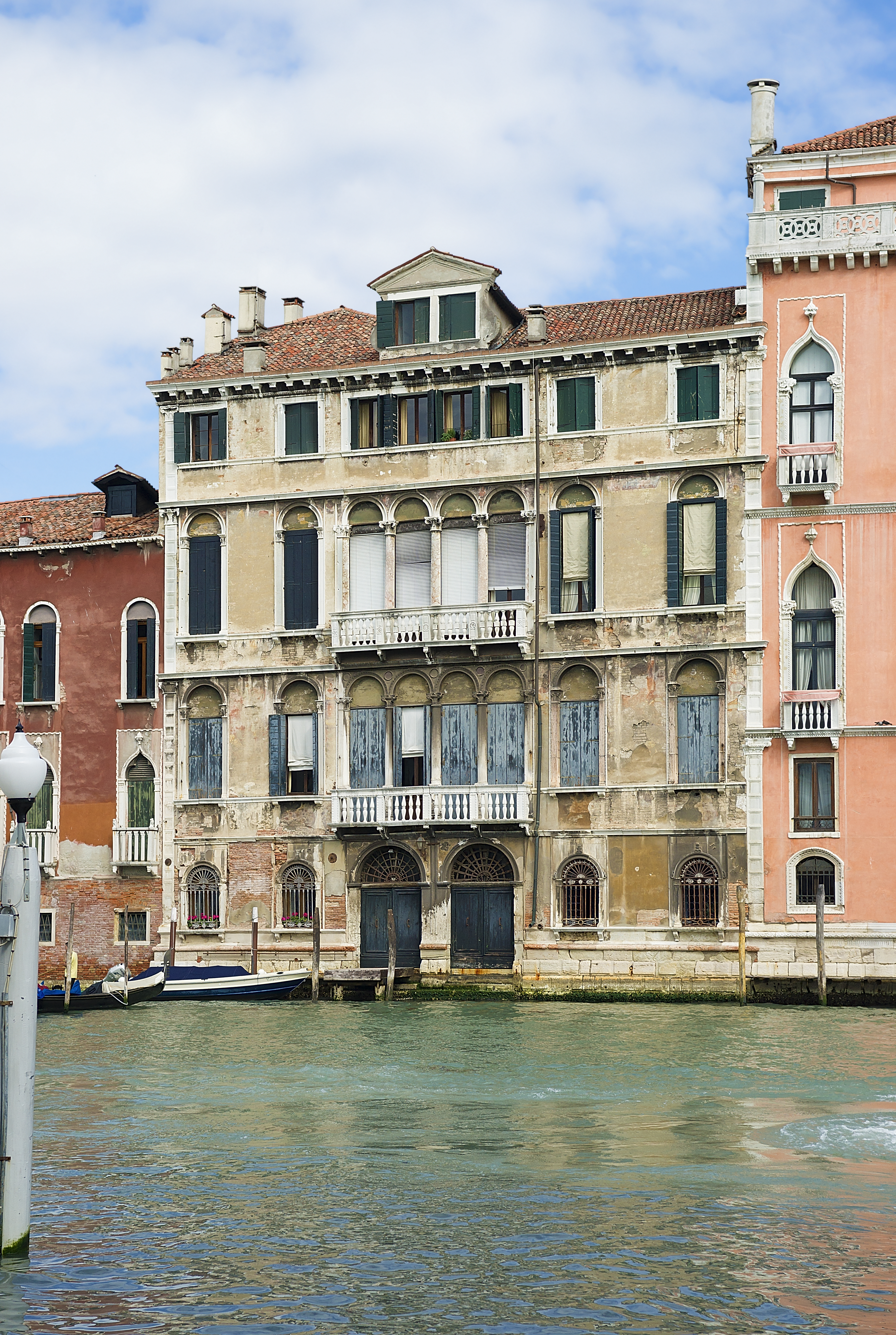
Palazzo Tiepolo

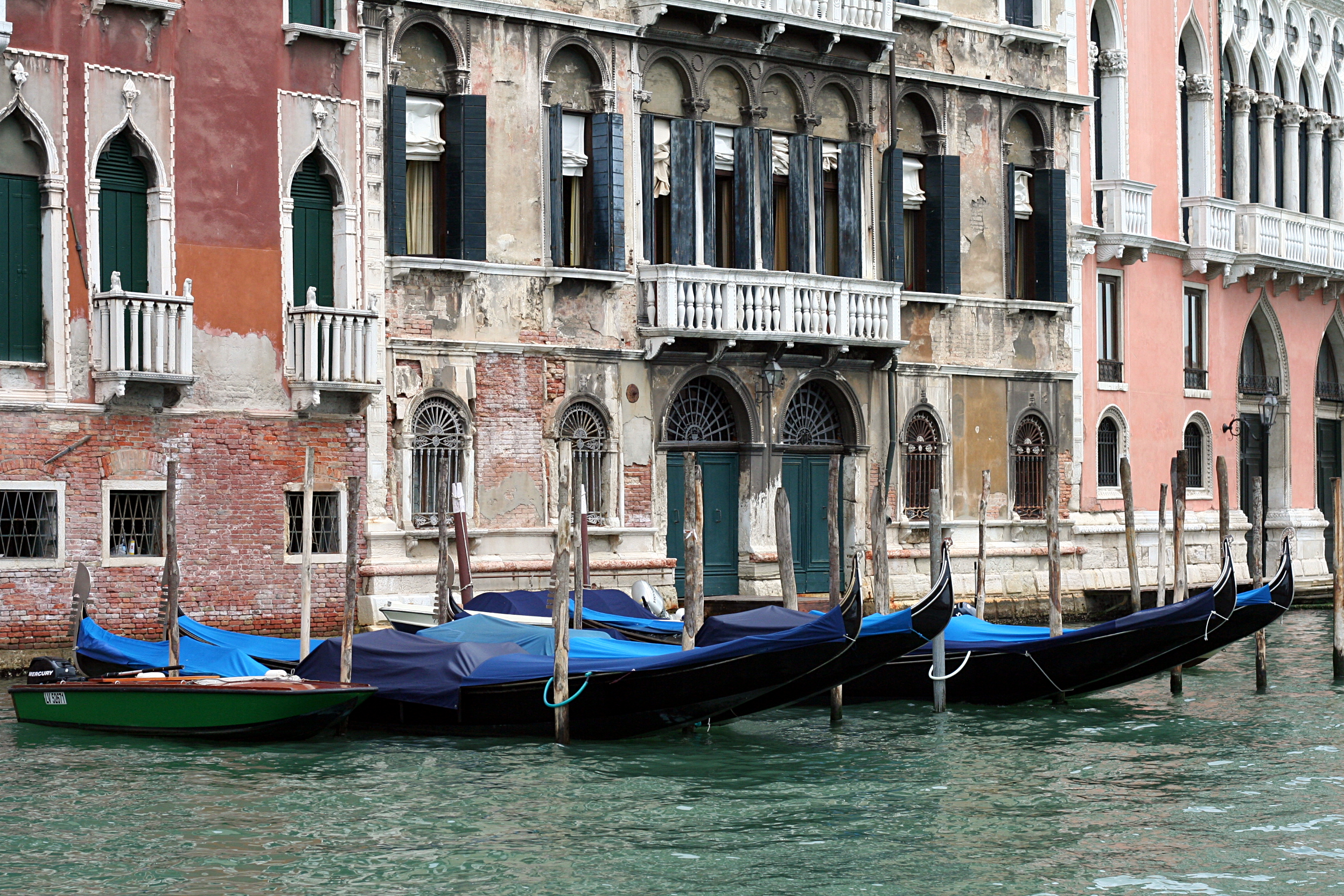
Gondolas moored next to Tiepolo Palace on the Canal Grande.

The Palazzo Tiepolo is a historic Renaissance-style palace located between the Palazzo Soranzo Pisani and the Palazzo Pisani Moretta on the Grand Canal, in the Sestieri of San Polo, Venice, Italy.

== History ==
The palace was commissioned in the second half of the 16th century at the site of an older palace by the aristocratic Tiepolo family. The facade was once frescoed by Andrea Schiavone; traces remain. The entry was frescoed by Jacopo Guarana and the interiors are decorated with polychrome stucco.

In the latter half of the 19th century, two exiled Montenegrin princesses—Darinka and her daughter Olga—took up permanent residence in the Palazzo Tiepolo.

Before World War I German writer Franz Joseph von Bülow lived in Palazzo Tiepolo.

== Bibliography ==
- Brusegan, Marcello (2007). The palaces of Venice. Rome: Newton & Compton. p. 345. ISBN 978-88-541-0820 -2. Brusegan.
