= Palazzo dei Dieci Savi =

Public building in Venice

Coordinates: 45°26′18″N 12°20′08″E

Façade on the Canal Grande

The Palazzo dei Dieci Savi is a palace on the Canal Grande, Venice, northern Italy. It is included in the sestiere (quarter) of San Polo and is not far from the Rialto Bridge, on the opposite side from the Palazzo dei Camerlenghi.

It was built in the first half of the 16th century, under design of Antonio Abbondi. It was the seat of the Dieci Savi alle Decime (lit. 'ten wise men at the tithes'), magistrates in charge of taxation of the Republic of Venice, maintaining this function until the end of the latter in 1797. Until 2014 it housed the city's water officers (Magistrato alle Acque).

== Description ==
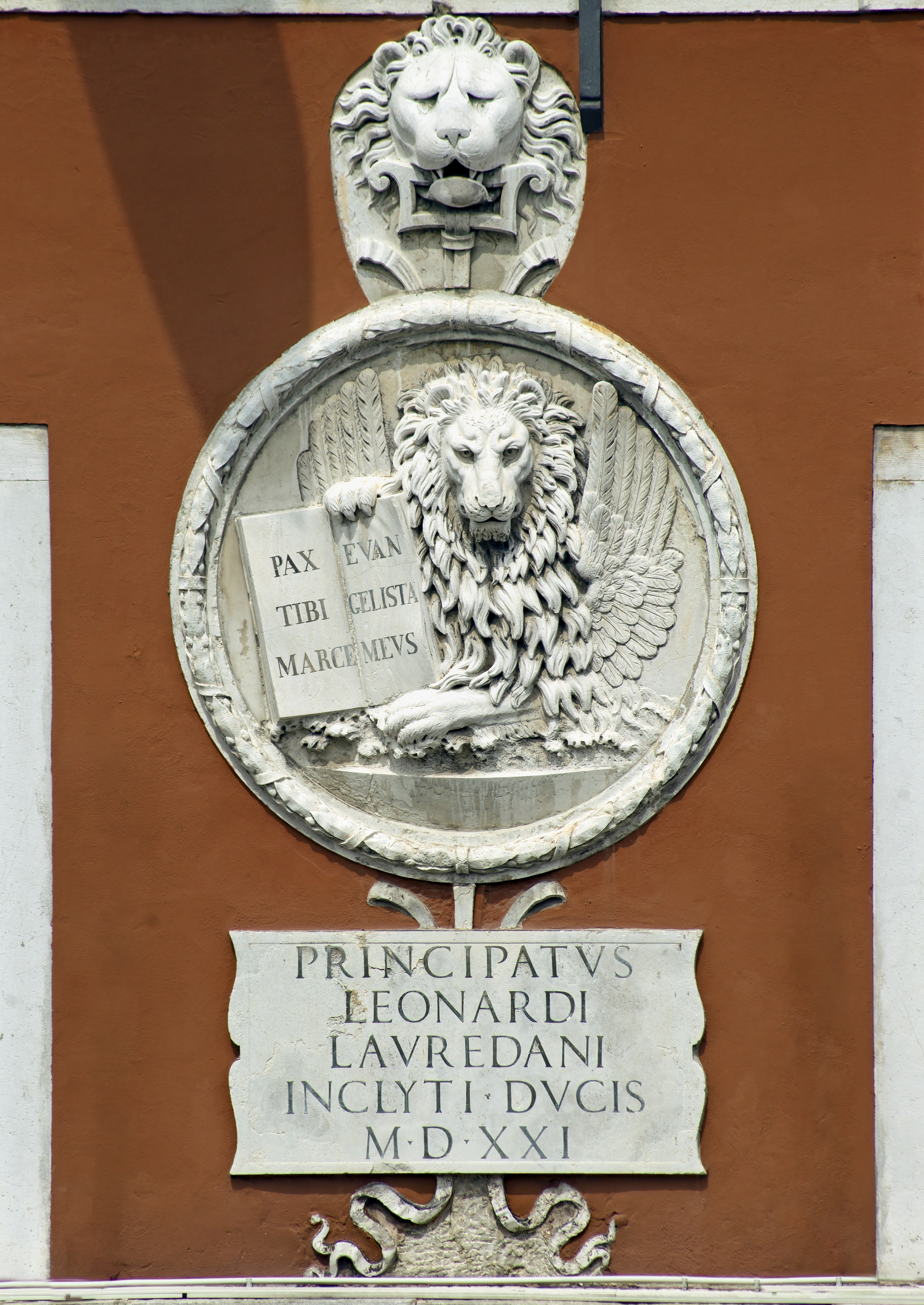
The Lion of St Mark on the facade

The palace has a longer façade on the Ruga (alley) dei Oresi and a shorter one on the Canal Grande. The former has a portico with 37 arcades, whose ceiling, with cross vaults, is covered by frescoes, most of which are preserved in a good state.

The two upper floors, divided by two thick frames, feature 37 mullioned windows with undecorated stone frames. At the top is a notched frame in correspondence with the attic. The façade on the canal is similar: It has four arcades at the bottom and five pairs of rectangular mullioned windows at the upper floors.

The only decorative elements are the 16th-century statue of Justice (second floor) at the corner, and a bas-relief with a Lion of St. Mark (1848), dating to the short-lived Republic of San Marco.

== See also ==
- Rialto Square
