= Palazzo Bernardo Nani =

Palace on the Grand Canal, Venice

Coordinates: 48.8583°N 2.2923°E

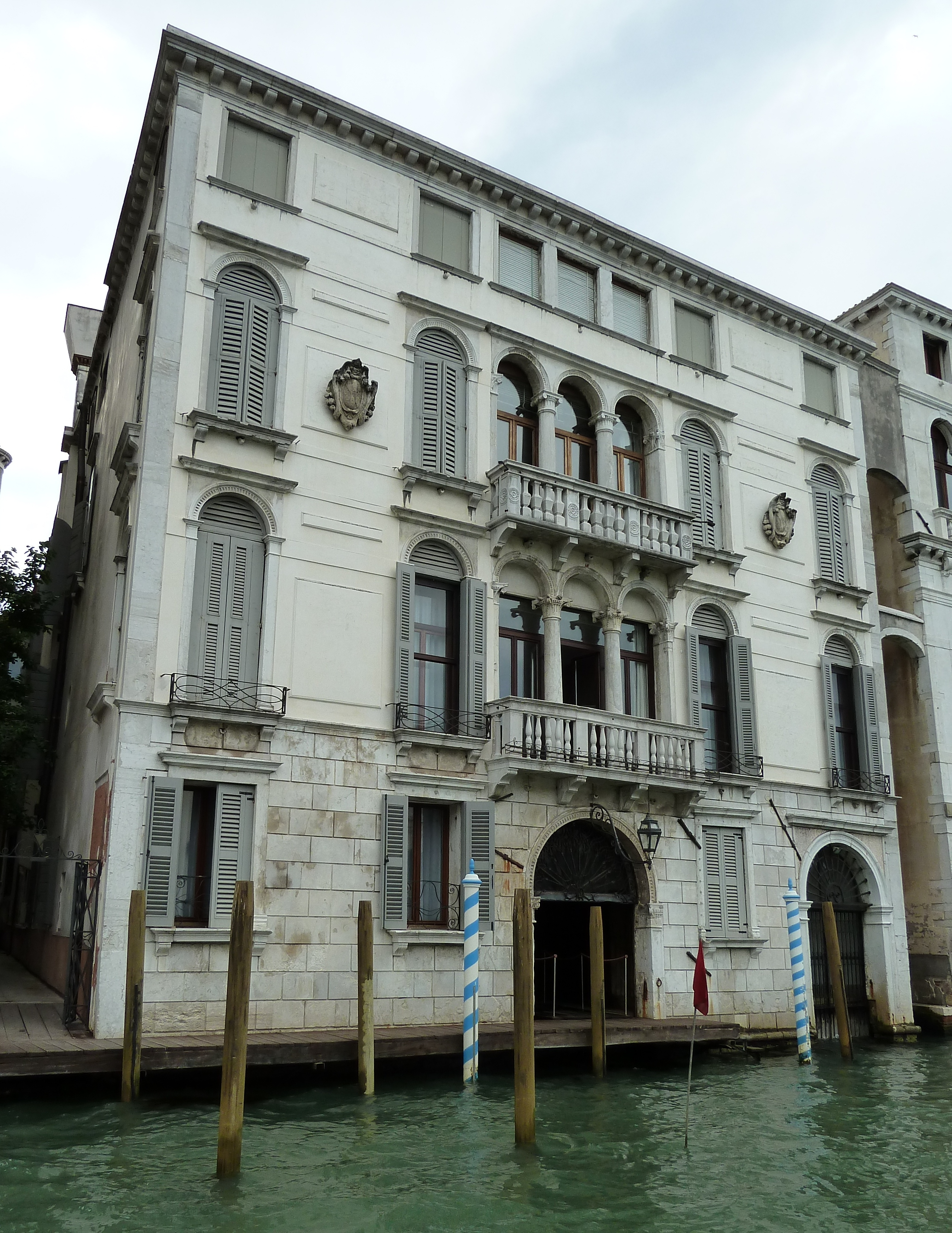
Palazzo Bernardo Nani

The Palazzo Bernardo Nani Lucheschi, also called the Palazzo Nani Bernardo, is a Renaissance-style palace between the Palazzo Giustinian Bernardo and the larger and more grandiose Ca' Rezzonico, on the Grand Canal in the sestiere of Dorsoduro in Venice, Italy.

== History ==
The building was built in the mid-16th century at the site of an earlier palace, commissioned by the patrician Bernardo family from Alessandro Vittoria. Originally, the main facade of the palace faced the site of the Ca' Rezzonico, formerly a garden. That facade was once heavily frescoed. The canal facade was added in the 17th century. The palace is privately owned and rented for events or as apartments.
