= San Polo =

One of the six sestieri of Venice, historical neighbourhood

Coordinates: 45°26′17″N 12°19′59″E

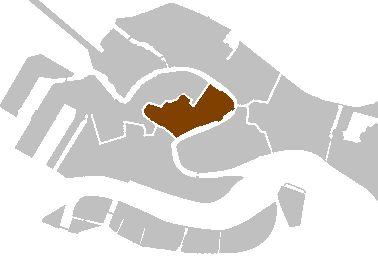
San Polo shown within Venice.

San Polo (Venetian: San Poło) is the smallest and most central of the six sestieri of Venice, northern Italy, covering 86 acres (35 hectares) along the Grand Canal. It is one of the oldest parts of the city, having been settled before the ninth century, when it and San Marco formed part of the Realtine Islands. The sestiere is named for the Church of San Polo.

The district has been the site of Venice's main market since 1097, and connected to the eastern bank of the Grande Canal by the Rialto bridge since the thirteenth century. The western part of the quarter is now known for its churches, while the eastern part, sometimes just called the Rialto, is known for its palaces and smaller houses.

Attractions in San Polo include the Rialto Bridge, the Church of San Giacomo di Rialto (according to legend the oldest in the city), the Campo San Polo with the Church of San Polo, the House of Goldoni, the Church of Santa Maria Gloriosa dei Frari, the Church of San Rocco and the Scuola Grande di San Rocco.
