= Grand Canal (Venice) =

Water channel in Venice, Italy

Canal Grande
- Canal
- {{{other_names}}}
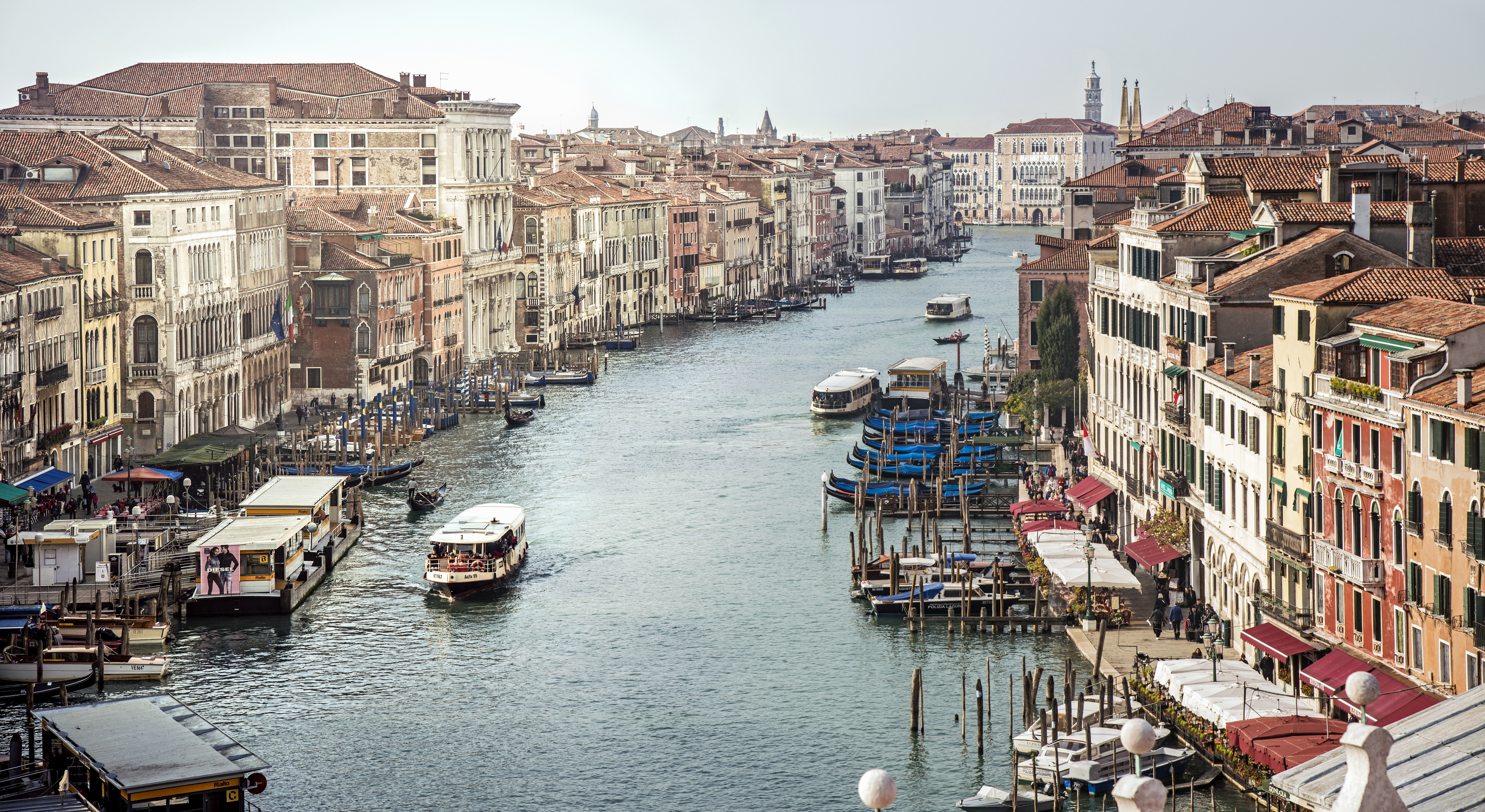
- The Grand Canal looking south from the Rialto Bridge
- Location: Venice, Italy
- Interactive map of Canal Grande
- Coordinates: 45°25′53″N 12°20′04″E

The Grand Canal (Italian: Canal Grande [kaˌnal ˈɡrande], locally and informally Canalazzo; Venetian: Canal Grando, locally usually Canałaso [kanaˈɰaso]) is the largest channel in Venice, Italy, forming one of the major water-traffic corridors in the city.

One end of the canal leads into the lagoon near the Santa Lucia railway station and the other end leads into the basin at San Marco; in between, it makes a large reverse-S shape through the central districts (sestieri) of Venice. It is 3.8 kilometres (2.4 miles) long, and 30 to 90 metres (98 to 295 ft) wide, with an average depth of 5 metres (16 feet).

== Description ==
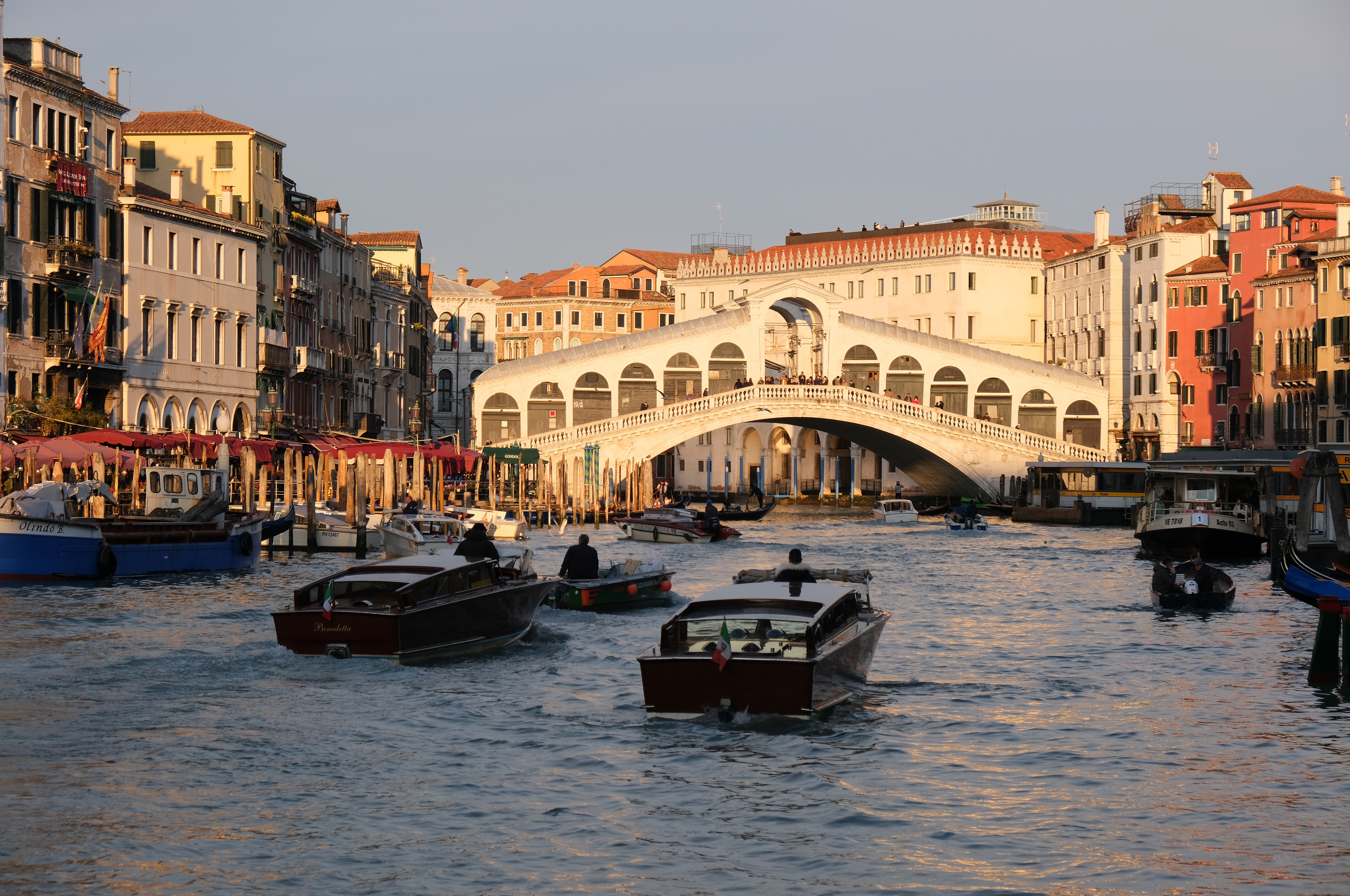
Rialto Bridge over the Grand Canal

The banks of the Grand Canal are lined with more than 170 buildings, most of which date from the 13th to the 18th century, and demonstrate the welfare and art created by the Republic of Venice. The noble Venetian families faced huge expenses to show off their richness in suitable palazzos; this contest reveals the citizens’ pride and the deep bond with the lagoon. Amongst the many are the Palazzi Barbaro, Ca' Rezzonico, Ca' d'Oro, Palazzo Dario, Ca' Foscari, Palazzo Barbarigo and to Palazzo Venier dei Leoni, housing the Peggy Guggenheim Collection. The churches along the canal include the basilica of Santa Maria della Salute. Centuries-old traditions, such as the Historical Regatta, are perpetuated every year along the Canal.

Because most of the city's traffic goes along the Canal rather than across it, only one bridge crossed the canal until the 19th century, the Rialto Bridge. There are currently three more bridges, the Ponte degli Scalzi, the Ponte dell'Accademia, and the controversial Ponte della Costituzione from 2008, designed by Santiago Calatrava, connecting the train station to Piazzale Roma, one of the few places in Venice where buses and cars can enter. As was usual in the past, people can still take a ferry ride across the canal at several points by standing up on the deck of a simple gondola called a traghetto, although this service is less common than even a decade ago.

Most of the palaces emerge from water without pavement. Consequently, one can only tour past the fronts of the buildings on the grand canal by boat.

== History ==
=== The first settlements ===
The Grand Canal probably follows the course of an ancient river (possibly a branch of the Brenta) flowing into the lagoon. Adriatic Veneti groups already lived beside the formerly-named "Rio Businiacus" before the Roman age. They lived in stilt houses and relied on fishing and commerce (mainly salt). Under the rule of the Roman Empire and later of the Byzantine Empire the lagoon became populated and important, and in the early 9th century the doge moved his seat from Malamocco to the safer "Rivoaltus".

Increasing trade followed the doge and found in the deep Grand Canal a safe and ship accessible canal-port. Drainage reveals that the city became more compact over time: at that time the Canal was wider and flowed between small, tide-subjected islands connected by wooden bridges.

=== "Fondaco" houses ===
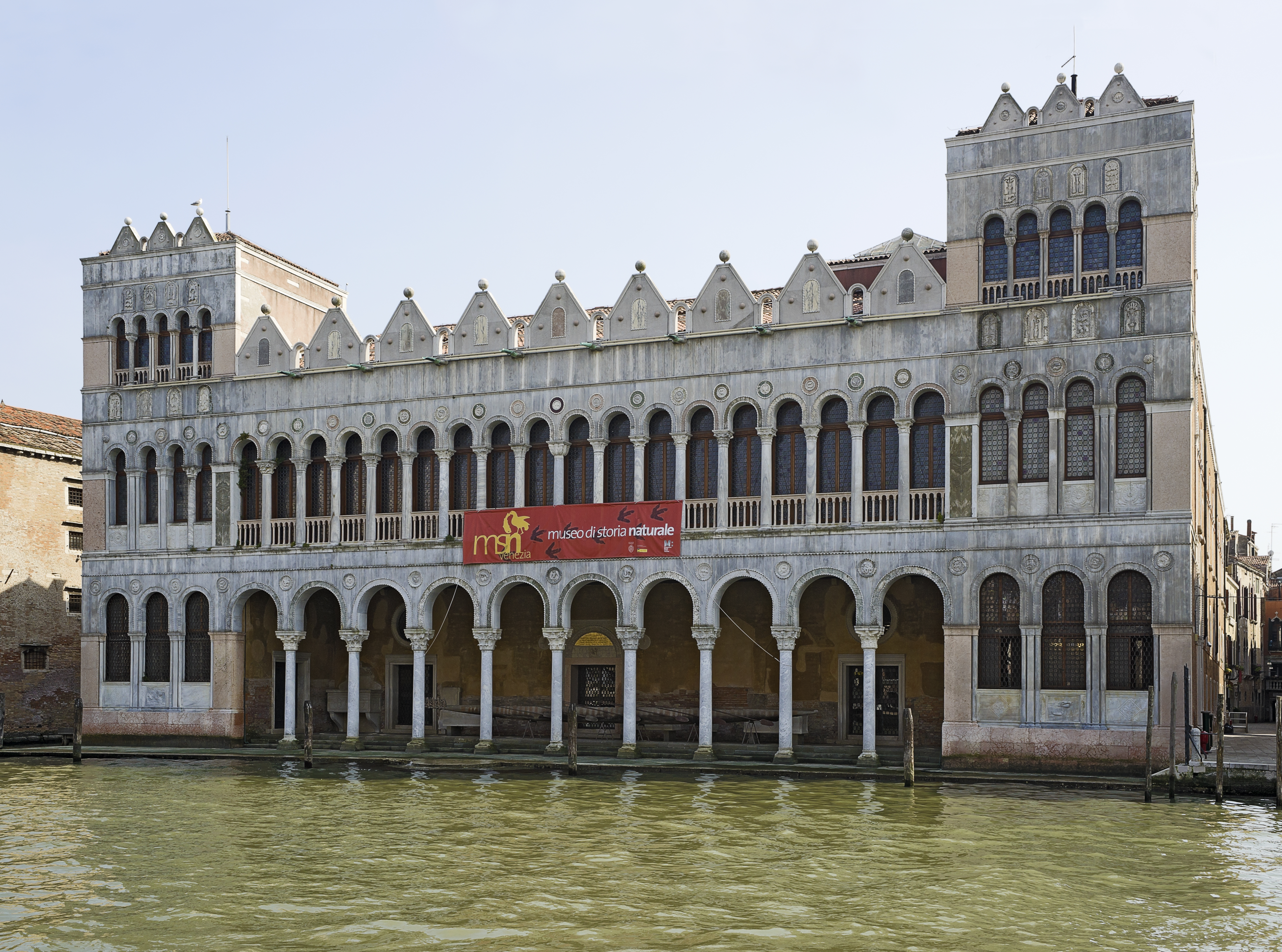
The Fondaco dei Turchi

Along the Canal, the number of "fondaco" houses increased, buildings combining the warehouse and the merchant's residence.

A portico (the curia) covers the bank and facilitates the ships' unloading. From the portico a corridor flanked by storerooms reaches a posterior courtyard. Similarly, on the first floor a loggia as large as the portico illuminates the hall into which open the merchant's rooms. The façade is thereby divided into an airy central part and two more solid sides. A low mezzanine with offices divides the two floors.

The fondaco house often had lateral defensive towers (torreselle), as in the Fondaco dei Turchi (13th century, heavily restored in the 19th). With the German warehouse, the Fondaco dei Tedeschi (which is also situated on the Grand Canal), it reflects the high number of foreign merchants working in Venice, where the republic supplied them with storerooms and lodging and simultaneously controlled their trading activity.

More public buildings were built along the Canal at Rialto: palaces for commercial and financial Benches (Palazzo dei Camerlenghi and Palazzo dei Dieci Savi, rebuilt after 1514 fire) and a mint. In 1181 Nicolò Barattieri constructed a pontoon bridge connecting Rialto to Mercerie area, which was later replaced by a wooden bridge with shops on it. Warehouses for flour and salt were more peripheral.

=== The Venetian-Byzantine style ===
From the Byzantine empire, goods arrived together with sculptures, friezes, columns and capitals to decorate the fondaco houses of patrician families. The Byzantine art merged with previous elements resulting in a Venetian-Byzantine style; in architecture, it was characterized by large loggias with round or elongated arches and by polychrome marbles abundance.

Along the Grand Canal, these elements are well preserved in Ca' Farsetti, Ca' Loredan (both municipal seats) and Ca' da Mosto, all dating back to the 12th or 13th century. During this period Rialto had an intense building development, determining the conformation of the Canal and surrounding areas. As a matter of fact, in Venice building materials are precious and foundations are usually kept: in the subsequent restorations, existing elements will be used again, mixing the Venetian-Byzantine and the new styles (Ca' Sagredo, Palazzo Bembo). Polychromy, three-partitioned façades, loggias, diffuse openings, and rooms disposition formed a particular architectural taste that continued in the future.

The Fourth Crusade, with the loot obtained from the sack of Constantinople (1204), and other historical situations, gave Venice an Eastern influence until the late 14th century.

=== Venetian Gothic ===
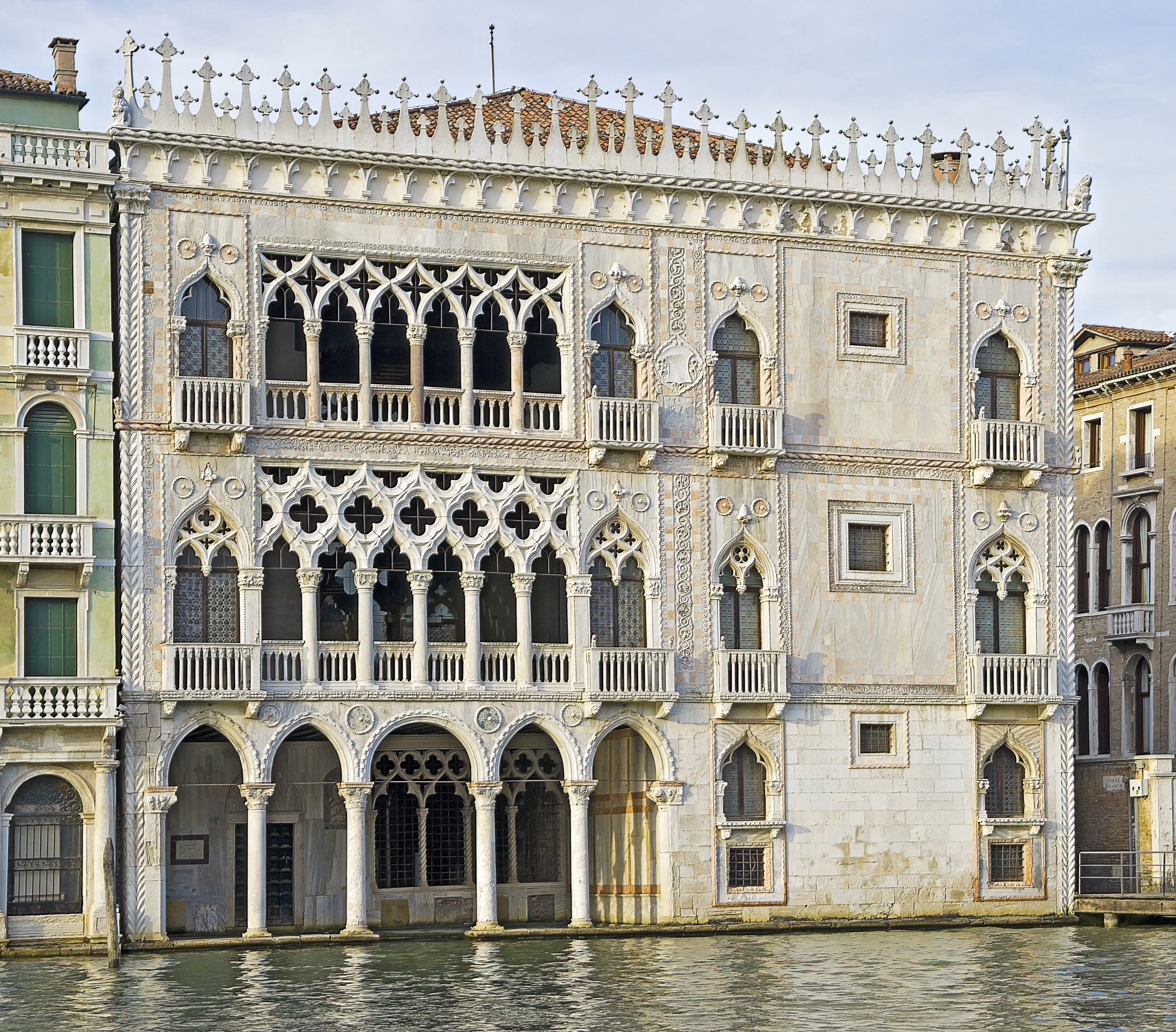
Ca' d'Oro

Venetian Gothic architecture found favor quite late, as a splendid flamboyant Gothic ("gotico fiorito") beginning with the southern façade of the Doge's Palace. The verticality and the illumination characterizing the Gothic style are found in the porticos and loggias of fondaco houses: columns get thinner, elongated arches are replaced by pointed or ogee or lobed ones. Porticos rise gently intertwining and drawing open marbles in quatrefoils or similar figures. Façades were plastered in brilliant colors.

The open marble fascias, often called "laces", quickly diffused along the Grand Canal. Among the 15th-century palaces still showing the original appearance are Ca' d'Oro, Palazzo Bernardo a San Polo, Ca' Foscari (now housing the University of Venice), Palazzo Pisani Moretta, Palazzi Barbaro, Palazzo Cavalli-Franchetti.

=== Renaissance ===
By the start of the 15th century, Renaissance architecture motifs appear in such buildings as the Palazzo Dario and the Palazzo Corner Spinelli; the latter was designed by Mauro Codussi, pioneer of this style in Venice. Ca' Vendramin Calergi, another of his projects (now hosting the Casino), reveals a completed transition: the numerous and large windows with open marbles are round-arched and have columns in the three classical orders.

Classical architecture is more evident in Jacopo Sansovino's projects, who arrived from Rome in 1527. Along the Canal, he designed Palazzo Corner and Palazzo Dolfin Manin, known for grandiosity, for the horizontal layout of the white façades and for the development around a central courtyard. Other Renaissance buildings are Palazzo Papadopoli and Palazzo Grimani di San Luca. Several palaces of this period had façades with frescoes by painters such as Il Pordenone, Tintoretto, Paolo Veronese, all of them unfortunately lost. Particularly noteworthy were the frescoes by Veronese and Zelotti on Ca Cappello, overlooking the Grand Canal at the intersection with the Rio de S. Polo.

=== Venetian Baroque ===
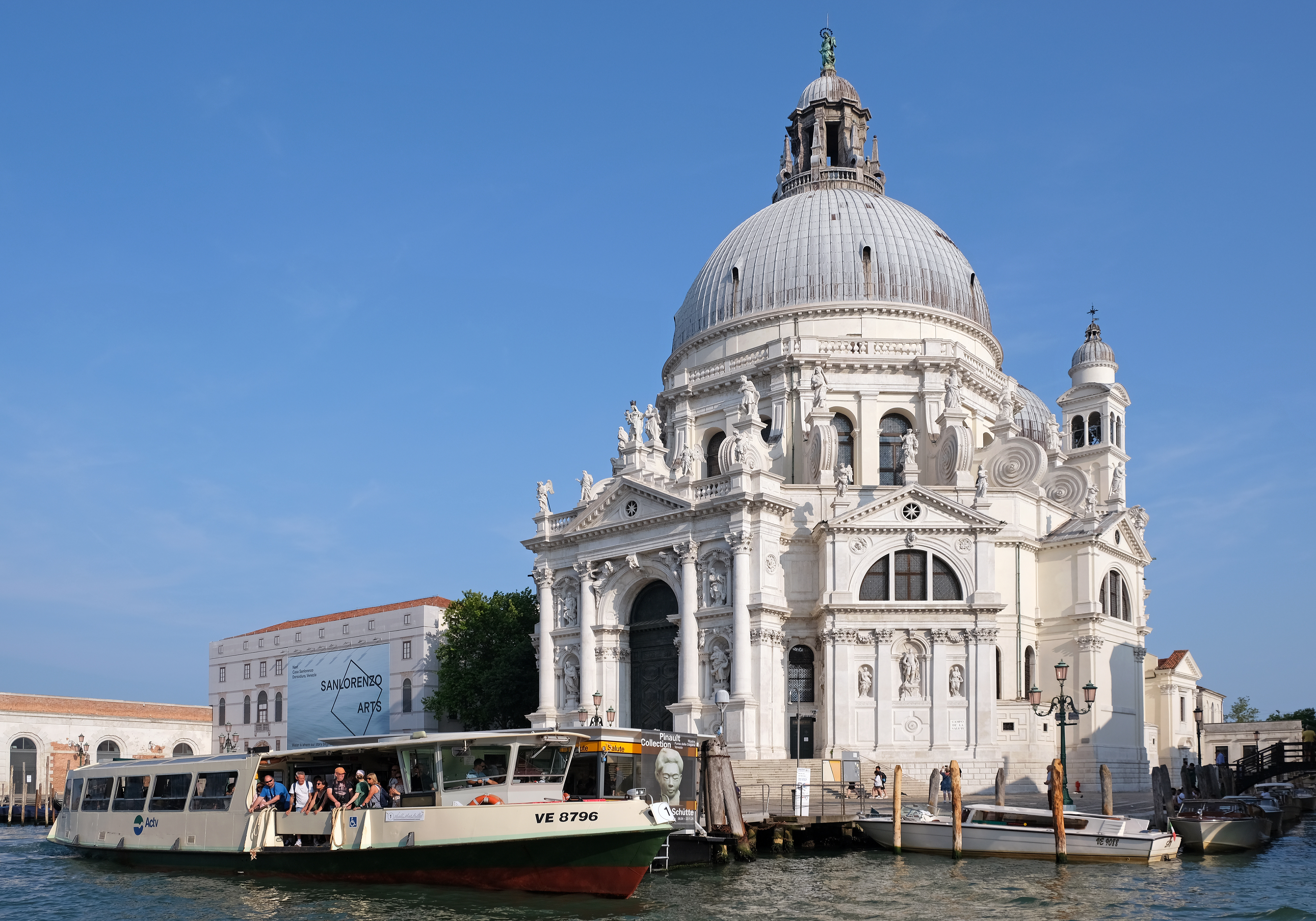
Santa Maria della Salute

In 1582, Alessandro Vittoria began the construction of Palazzo Balbi (now housing the Government of Veneto), in which Baroque elements can be recognized: fashioned cornices, broken pediments, ornamental motifs.

The major Baroque architect in Venice was Baldassarre Longhena. In 1631 he began to build the magnificent Santa Maria della Salute basilica, one of the most beautiful churches in Venice and a symbol of Grand Canal. The classical layout of the façade features decorations and by many statues, the latter crowning also the refined volutes surrounding the major dome.

Longhena later designed two majestic palaces, Ca' Pesaro and Ca' Rezzonico (with many carvings and chiaroscuro effects), and Santa Maria di Nazareth church (Chiesa degli Scalzi). For various reasons the great architect did not see any of these buildings finished, and the designs for all but Santa Maria Della Salute were modified after his death.

Longhena's themes recur in the two older façades of Palazzo Labia, containing a famous fresco cycle by Giambattista Tiepolo. In the Longhenian school grew Domenico Rossi (San Stae's façade, Ca' Corner della Regina) and Giorgio Massari, who later completed Ca' Rezzonico.

The 16th and 17th centuries mark the beginning of the Republic's decline, but nevertheless, they saw the highest building activity on the Grand Canal. This can be partially explained by the increasing number of families (like the Labia) becoming patrician by the payment of an enormous sum to the Republic, which was then facing financial difficulties. Once these families had achieved this new status, they built themselves with impressive residences on the Canal, often inducing other families to renew theirs.

=== Neoclassical architecture ===
Neoclassical architectures along the Canal date to the 18th century: during the first half was built San Simeone Piccolo, with an impressive corinthian portico, central plan and a high copper-covered dome ending in a cupola shaped as a temple. Date to the second half Massari's Palazzo Grassi.

=== Modern era ===
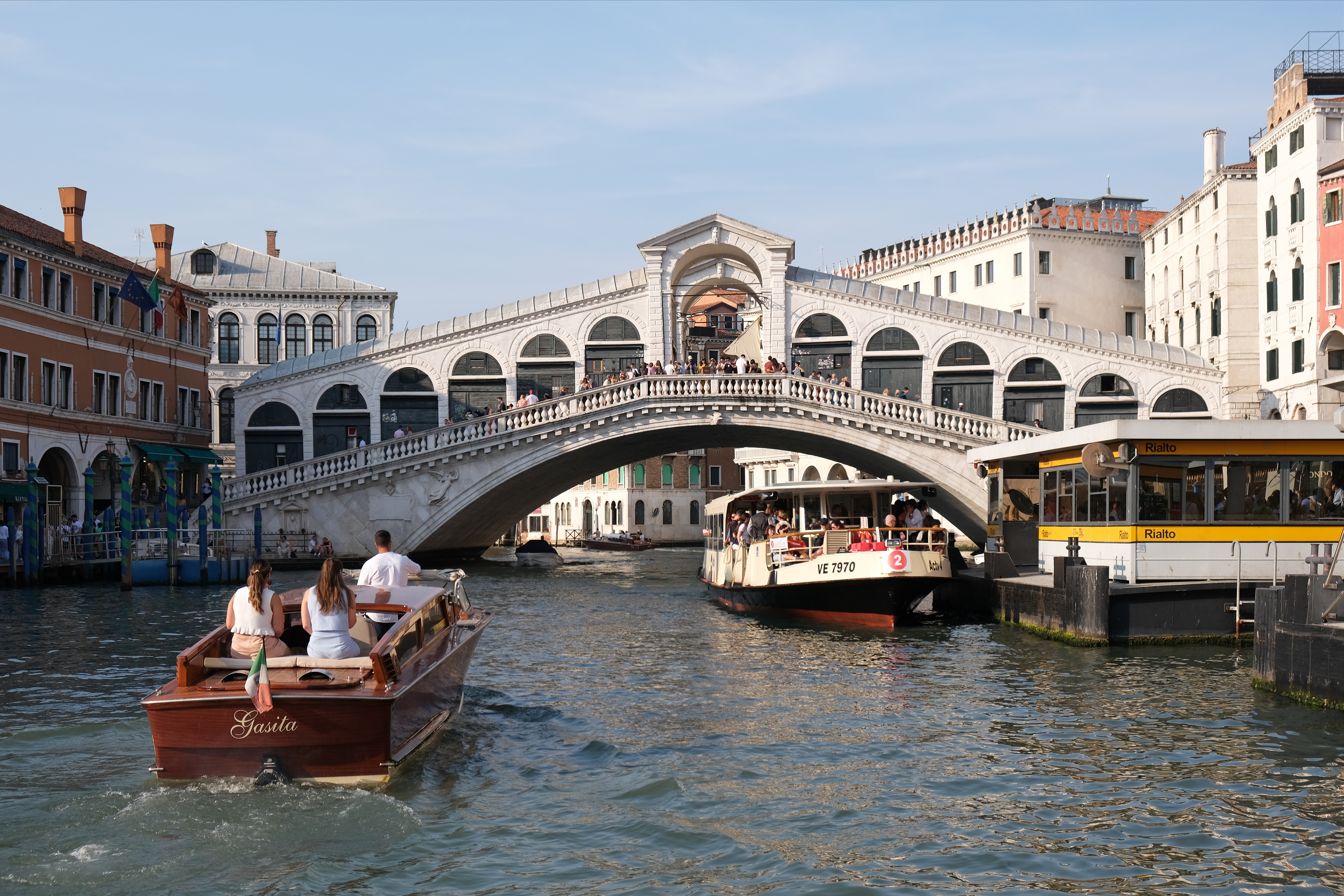
Water taxi boats and vaporettos (water buses) carry passengers through the Grand Canal: water bus and bus stop on Rialto

After the fall of the Republic of Venice in 1797, much of the palatial construction in Venice was suspended, as symbolized by the unfinished San Marcuola and Palazzo Venier dei Leoni (housing the Peggy Guggenheim Collection). The Patrician families, bereft of their hereditary role in governance and sometimes persecuted by revolutionary forces, sought other residences. Several historical palaces were pulled down, but many found other uses, and some restorations have saved their 18th-century appearance. By the late 20th century, most of the more prominent palaces were owned by the city, state, or civic institutions.

During the era of the Napoleonic Kingdom of Italy, the Napoleonic suppression of the monastic religious orders vacated large sectors of real estate in the city. It also freed large amounts of furnishings and works of art into the antiquarian market or into the possession of the state. Large monasteries changed functions: the Santa Maria della Carità complex became a museum, the Gallerie dell'Accademia; the Santa Croce complex, was converted into the Papadopoli Gardens area; and the Santa Lucia complex (partially designed by Palladio) was razed for the establishment of the Santa Lucia Station.

The Kingdom of Italy accession restored serenity in the city and stimulated construction along the Grand Canal respecting its beauty, often reproduced in Gothic Revival architectures like the Pescaria at Rialto.

== Events ==
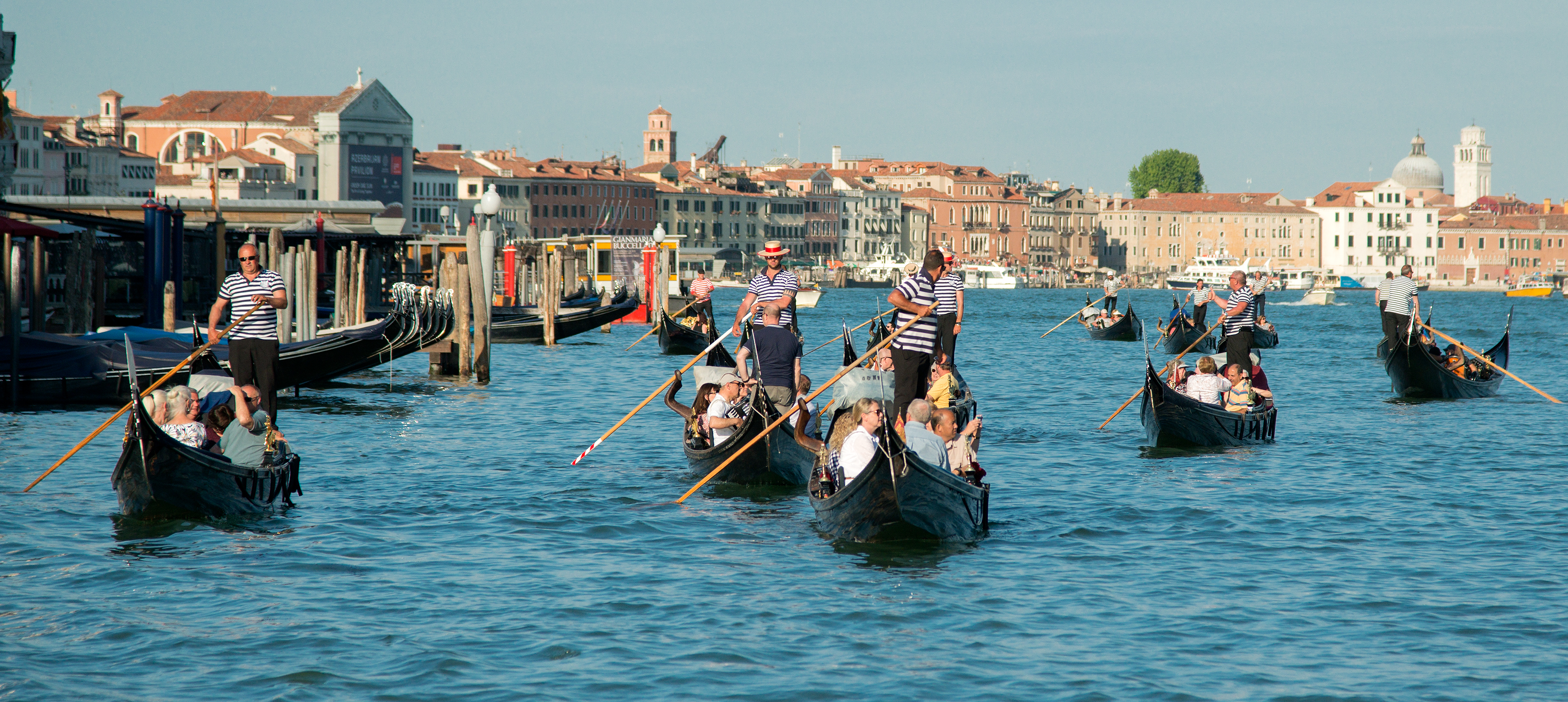
Gondolas on the Grand Canal

=== Historical Regatta ===
On the first Sunday of September the Historical Regatta ("Regata Storica") takes place, a competition between Venetian boats watched by thousands of people from the banks or from floating stands. Competitions are preceded by a historical procession ("Corteo Storico") remembering the entrance of the Queen of Cyprus Catherine Cornaro after abdication in 1489: gondoliers in costumes sail in typical 16th century boats following the Bucentaur, doge's state galley.

=== The Feast-day of the Madonna della Salute ===
On November 21, Venetians thank the Virgin Mary for salvation from the plague epidemic in 1630–38 with a pilgrimage to Santa Maria della Salute. Pilgrims cross the Grand Canal on a temporary pontoon bridge from Campo Santa Maria del Giglio, and enjoy stalls and traditional dishes.

== Gallery ==
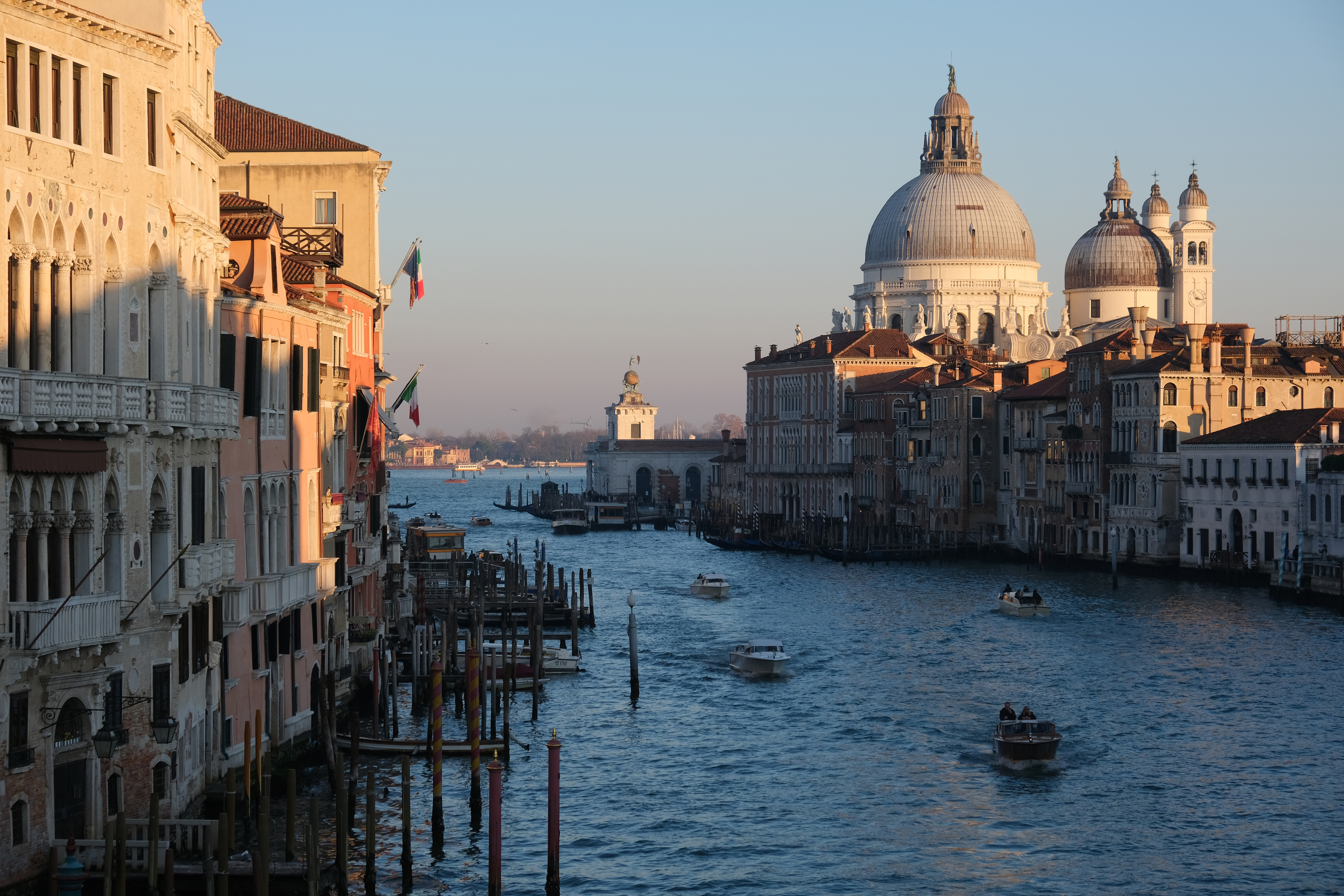
The Grand Canal from Ponte dell'Accademia: Santa Maria della Salute church

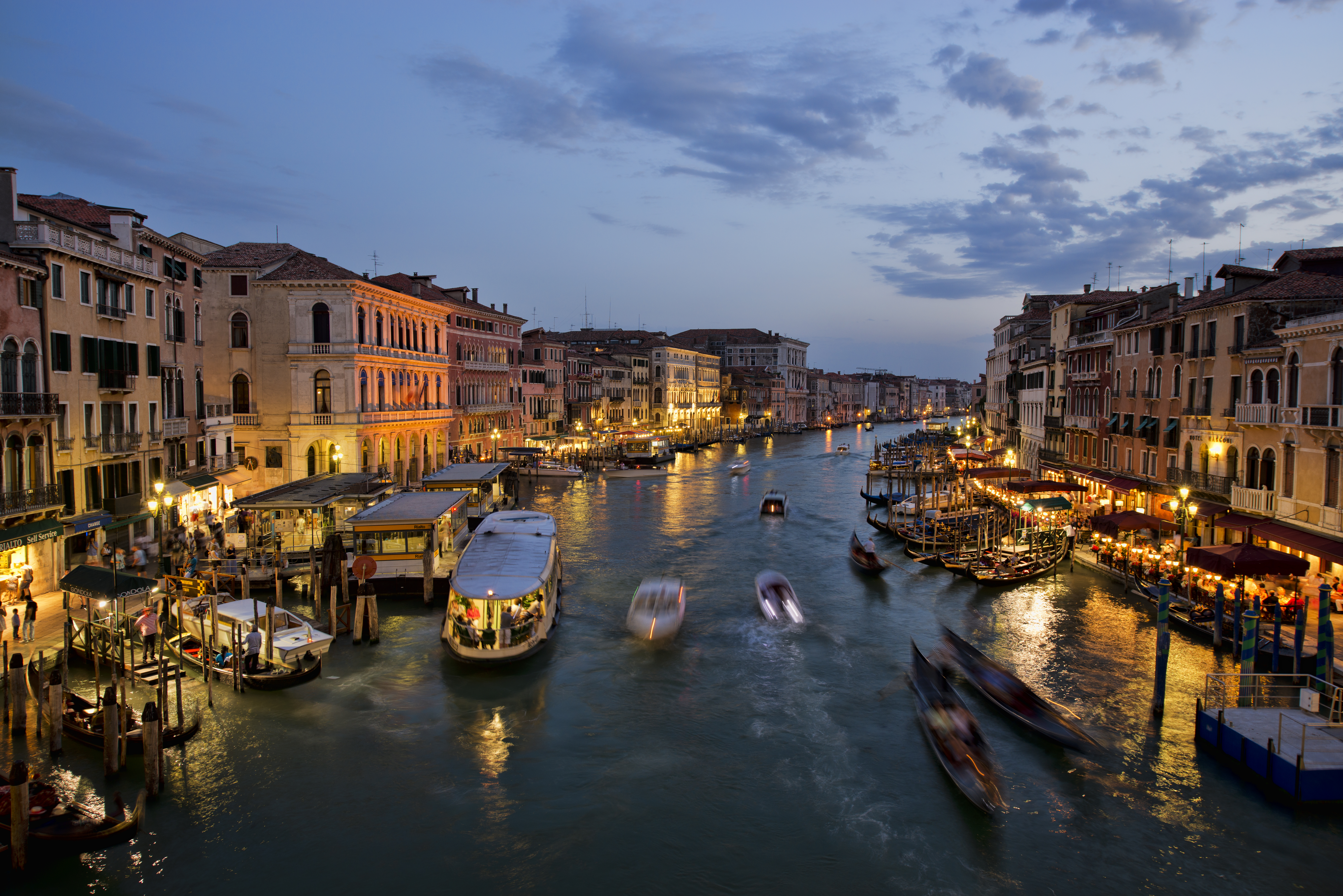
The Grand Canal in Venice, Italy, shot at night from Rialto Bridge

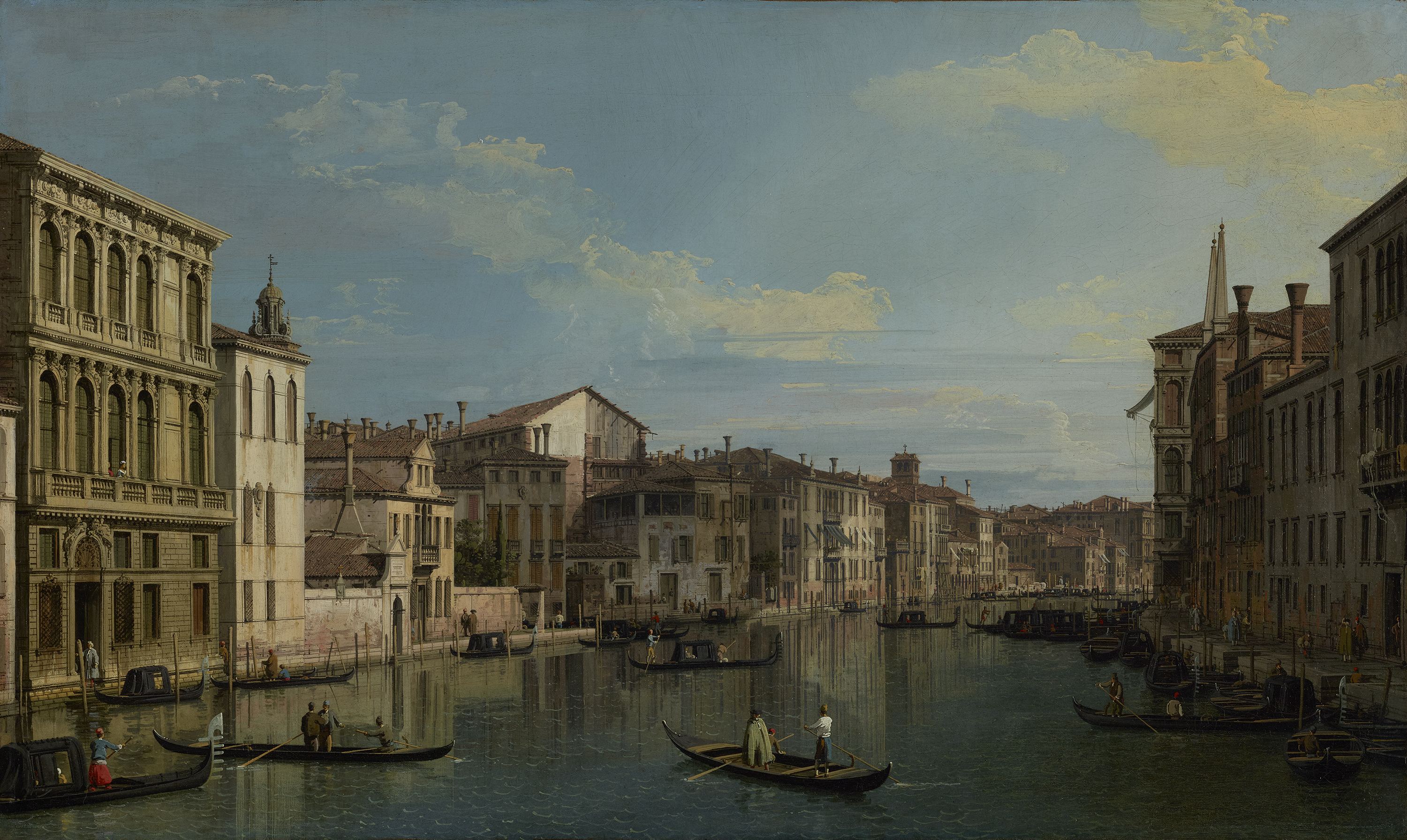
The Grand Canal in Venice from Palazzo Flangini to Campo San Marcuola, Canaletto, about 1738. The J. Paul Getty Museum, Los Angeles

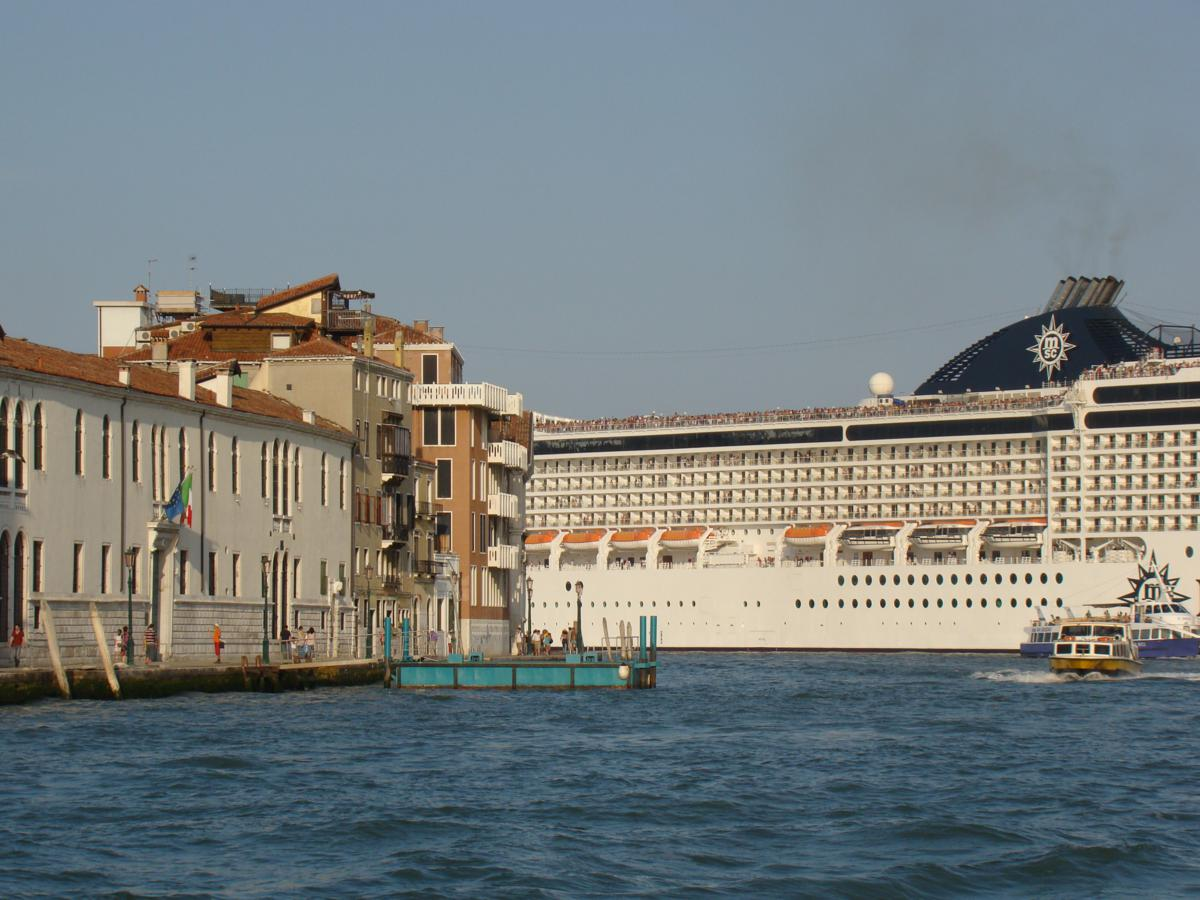
Ocean ship entering Giudecca Canal seen from Grand Canal

== See also ==
- List of buildings and structures in Venice
- Republic of Venice
- Grand Canal (Venice) architecture for listing and identification of buildings along the canal

Preceded by Gallerie dell'Accademia	Venice landmarks Grand Canal	Succeeded by Piazza San Marco
