= List of buildings and structures in Venice =

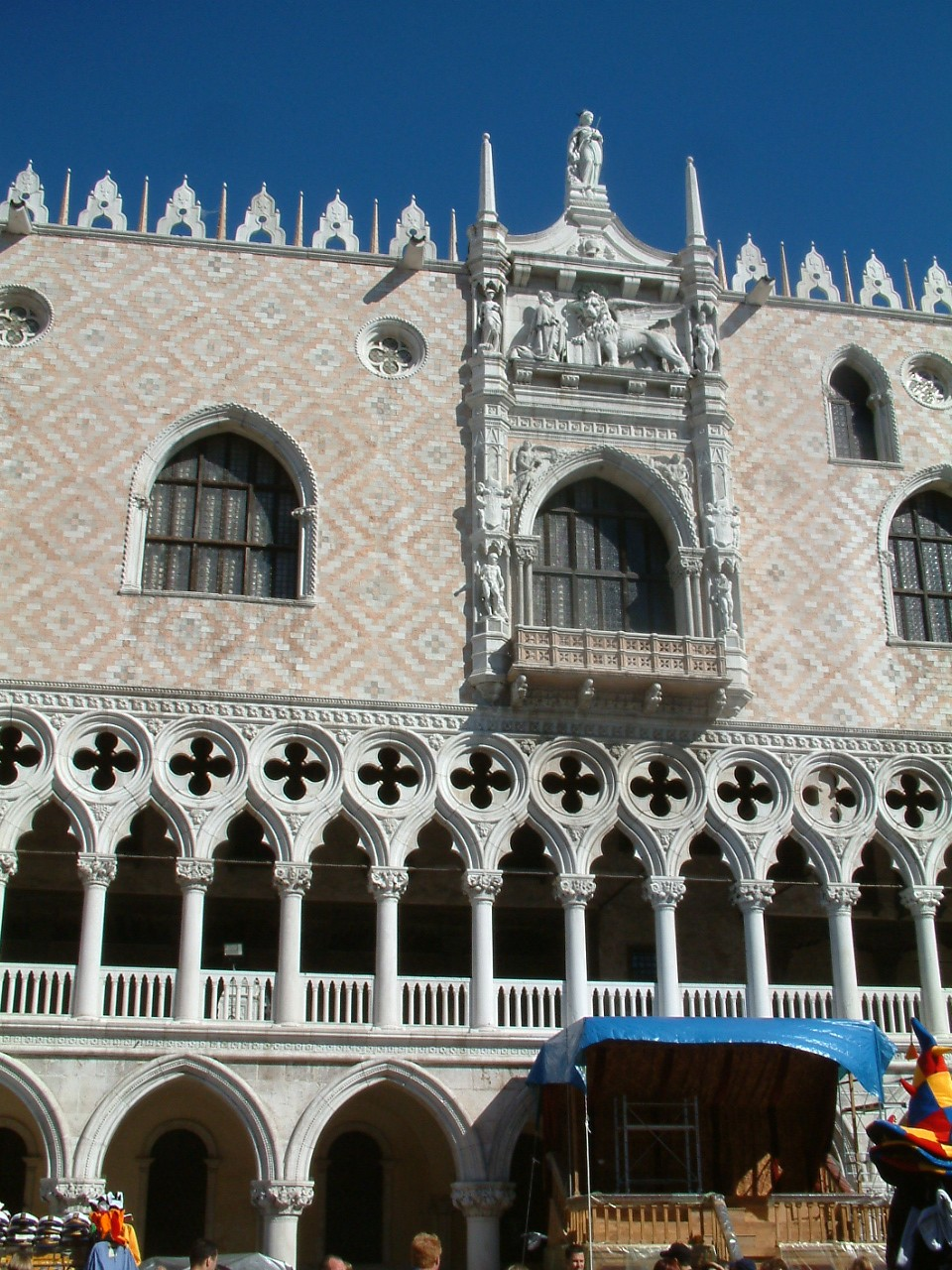
Doge's Palace

This is a list of buildings and structures in Venice, Italy.

== A ==
- Ala Napoleonica
- Arsenal
- Ateneo Veneto

== B ==
- Biblioteca Marciana

== C ==
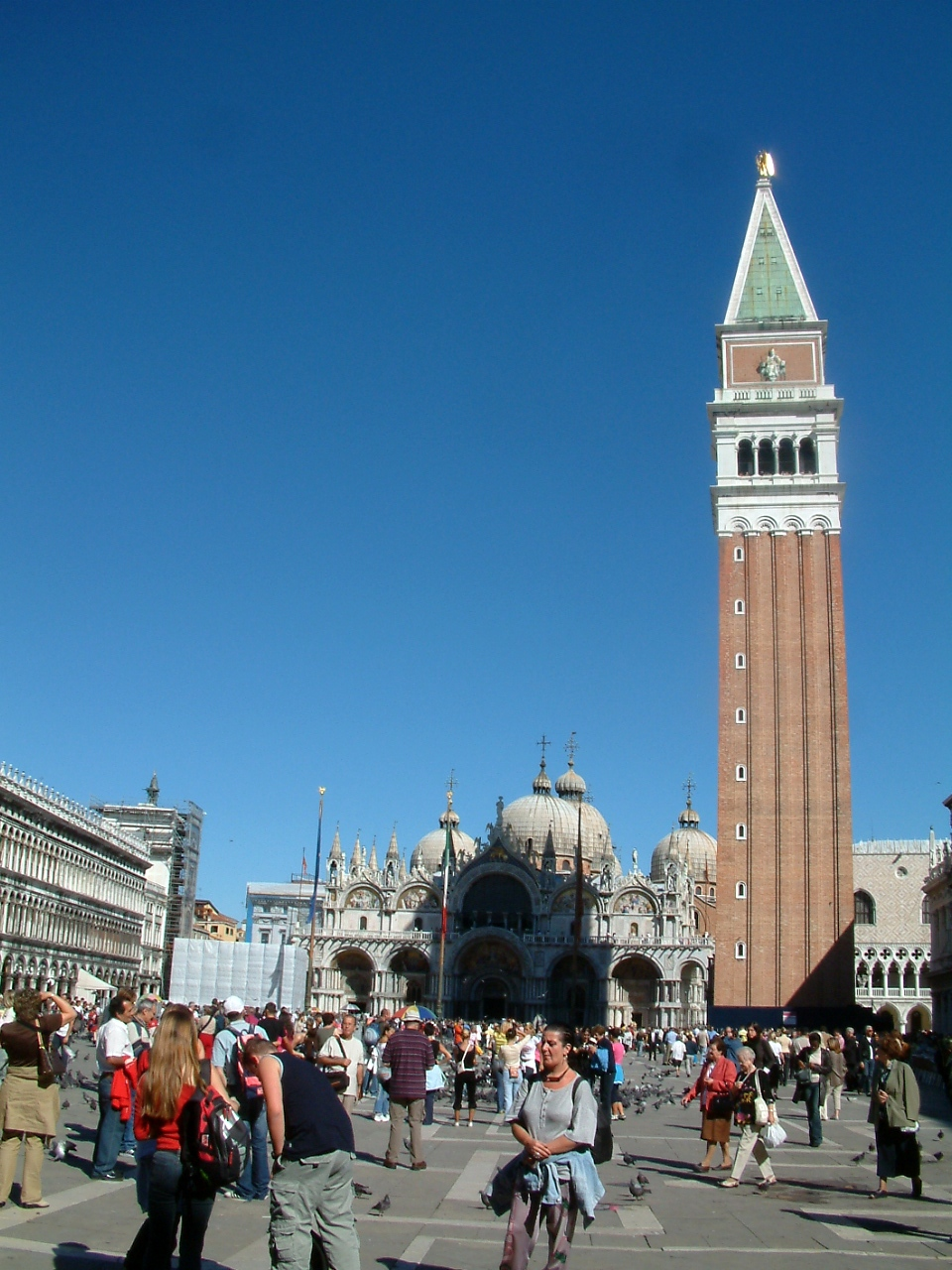
Campanile di San Marco

- Ca' da Mosto
- Ca' d'Oro
- Ca' Farsetti
- Ca' Foscari
- Ca' Loredan
- Ca' Pesaro
- Ca' Rezzonico
- Ca' Tron
- Ca' Vendramin Calergi
- Campanile di San Marco
- Campo San Polo
- Campo San Samuele
- Campo San Zanipolo
- Campo Santa Margherita
- Campo Sant'Angelo
- Corte del Milion

== D ==
- Dogana da Mar
- Doge's Palace

== F ==
- Fabbriche Nuove di Rialto (Erberia)
- Fabbriche Vecchie di Rialto
- La Fenice
- Fondaco del Megio
- Fondaco dei Tedeschi
- Fondaco dei Turchi
- Fondazione Querini Stampalia
- Forte di Sant'Andrea

== G–O ==
- Giardinetti Reali
- Italian Synagogue
- Loggette di San Marco
- Mercerie
- Molino Stucky
- Murano Glass Museum
- Museo Storico Navale
- Museo di Palazzo Mocenigo
- Oratorio dei Crociferi

== P ==
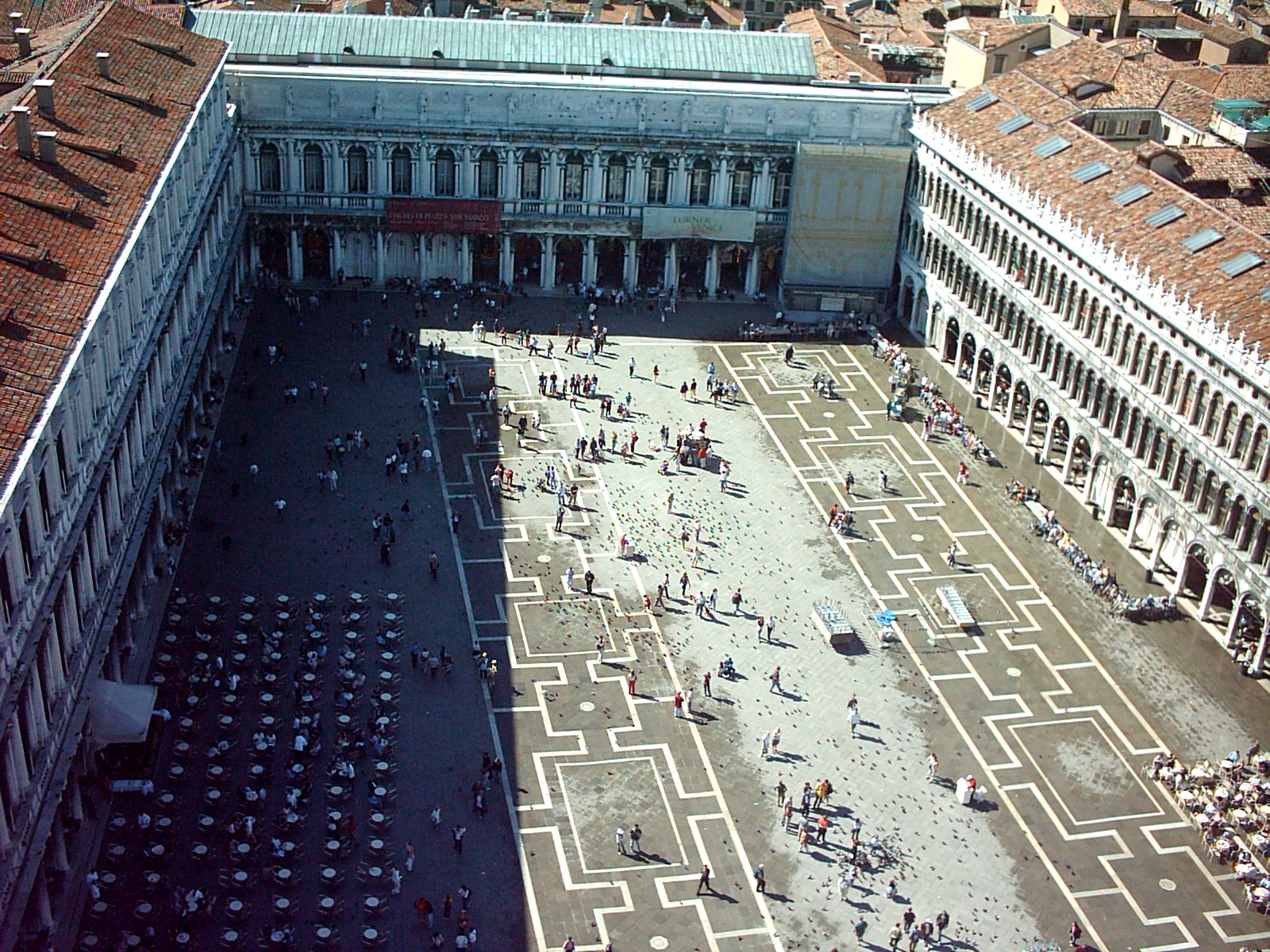
Piazza San Marco

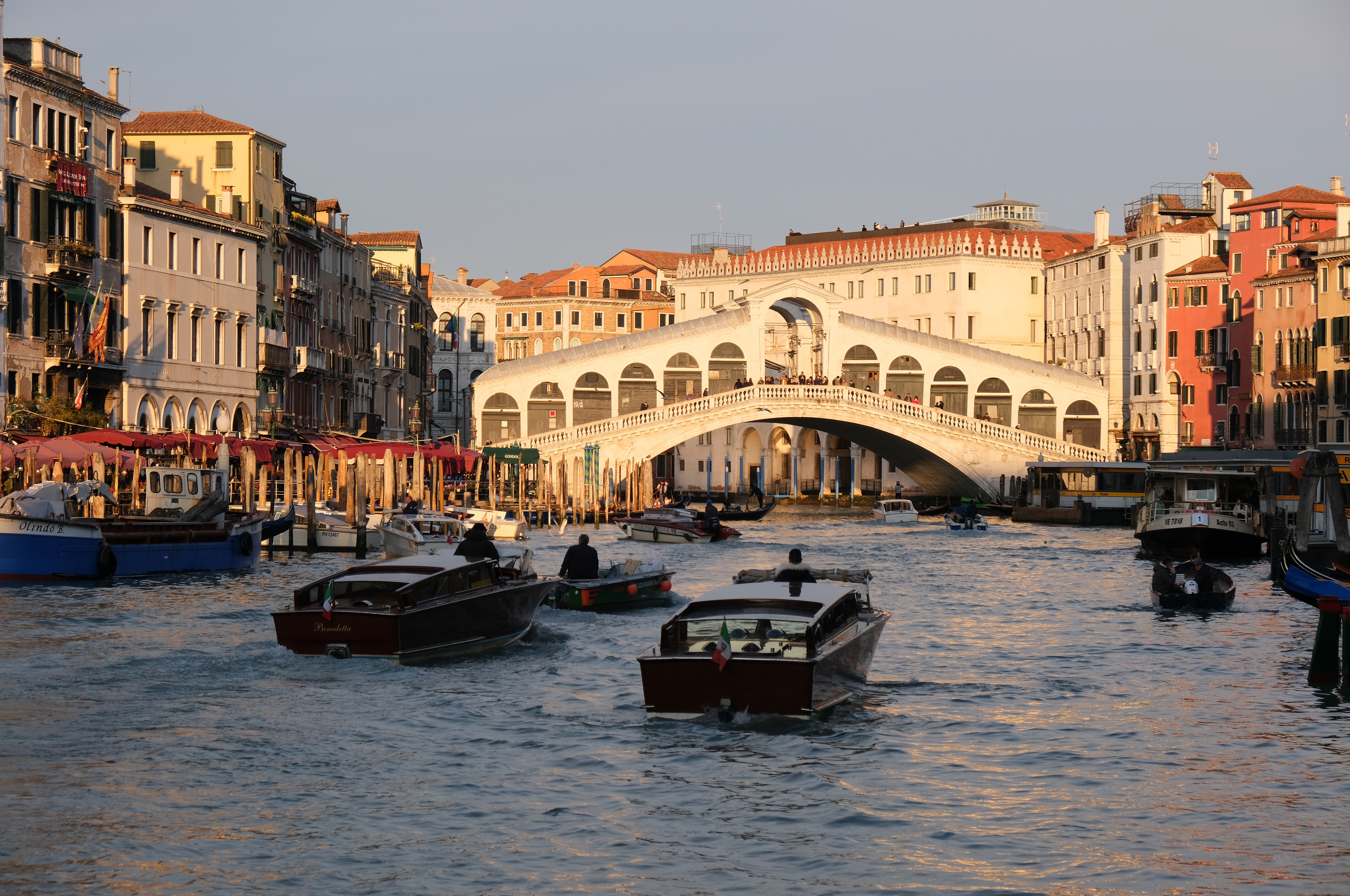
Grand Canal and Ponte di Rialto

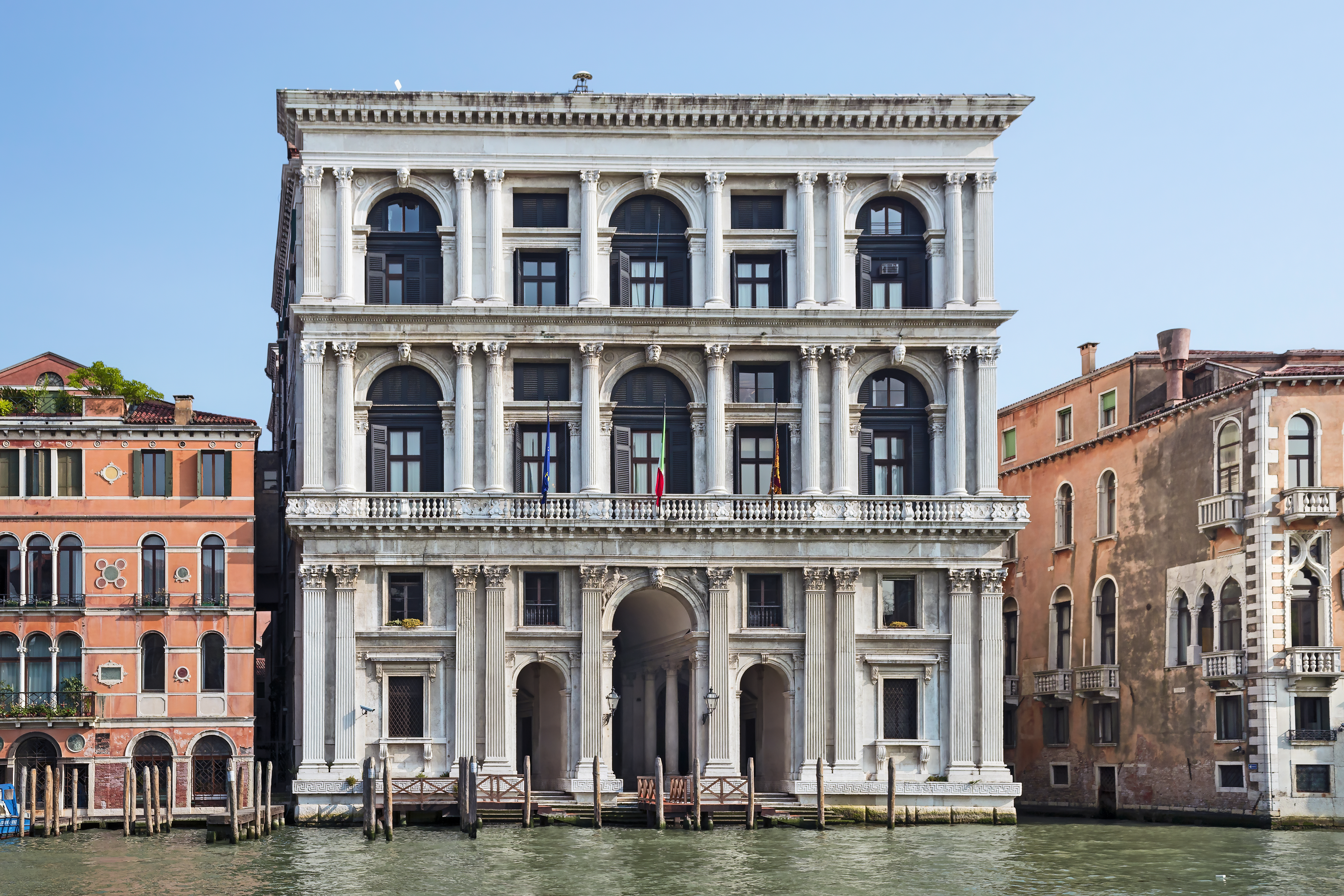
Palazzo Grimani di San Luca

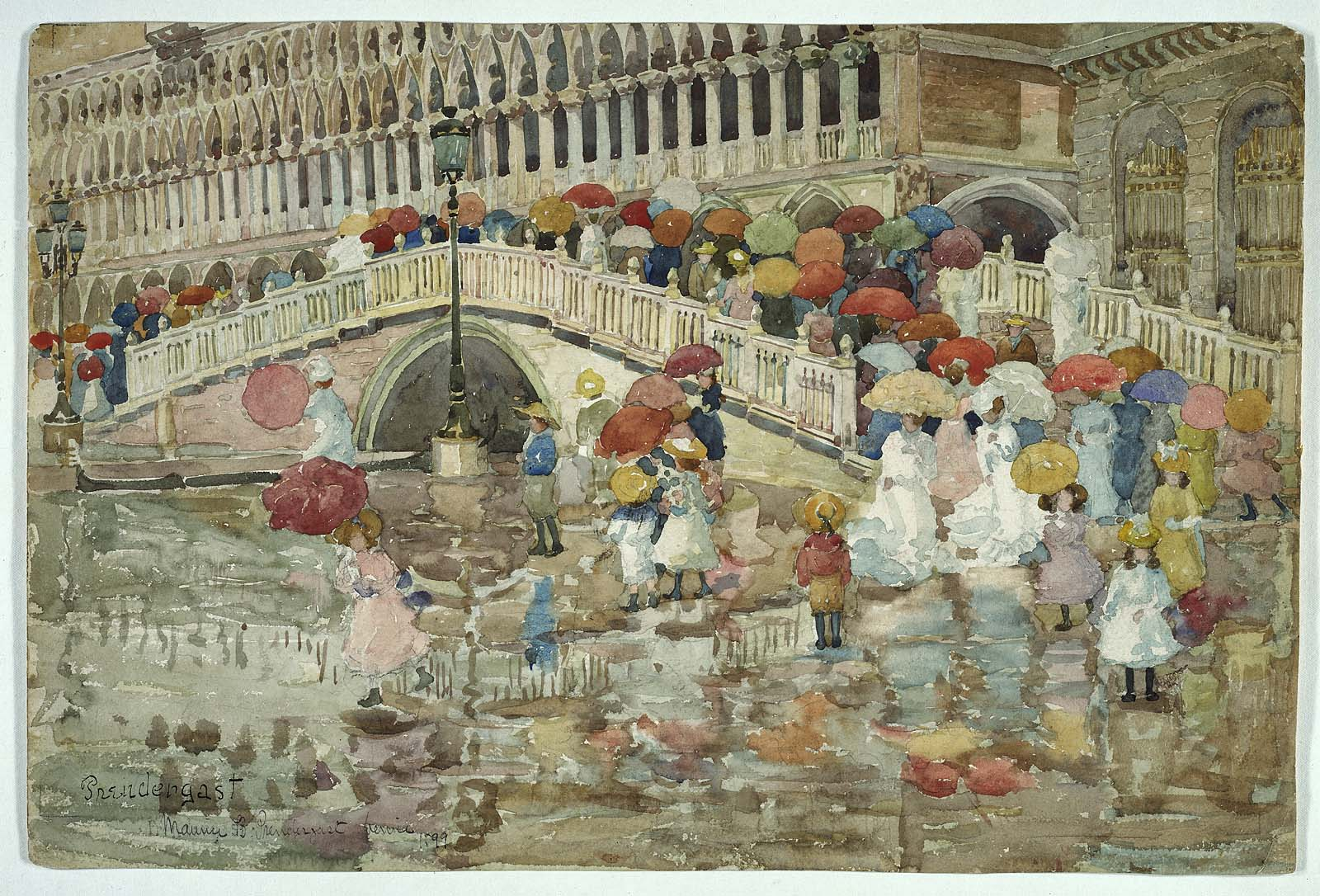
Umbrellas in the Rain by Maurice Prendergast, painting of the Ponte della paglia

- Palazzetto da Lezze
- Palazzo Adoldo
- Palazzo Albrizzi
- Palazzo Ariani
- Palazzo Balbi
- Palazzo Barbarigo
- Palazzo Barbarigo Minotto
- Palazzo Barbarigo Nani Mocenigo
- Palazzi Barbaro
- Palazzo Barbaro Wolkoff
- Palazzo Barozzi
- Palazzo Barzizza
- Palazzo Bellavite
- Palazzo Belloni Battagia
- Palazzo Bembo
- Palazzo Bernardo
- Palazzo Bonfadini Vivante
- Palazzo Brandolin Rota
- Palazzo Bollani Erizzo
- Palazzo Calbo Crotta
- Palazzo dei Camerlenghi
- Palazzo del Cammello (Mastelli)
- Palazzo Cavalli
- Palazzo Cavalli-Franchetti
- Palazzo Civran Grimani
- Palazzo Contarini Dal Zaffo
- Palazzo Contarini del Bovolo
- Palazzo Contarini Fasan
- Palazzo Contarini Pisani
- Palazzo Corner Contarini dei Cavalli
- Palazzo Corner Spinelli
- Palazzo Corner Valmarana
- Palazzo Correr Contarini Zorzi
- Palazzo Correggio
- Palazzo D'Anna Viaro Martinengo Volpi di Misurata
- Palazzo Dandolo
- Palazzo Dandolo Paolucci
- Palazzo Dario
- Palazzo dei Dieci Savi
- Palazzo Donà
- Palazzo Donà Balbi
- Palazzo Donà Giovannelli
- Palazzo Erizzo Nani Mocenigo
- Palazzo Foscari Contarini
- Palazzo Foscari (Giudecca 795)
- Palazzo Giovanelli
- Palazzo Giustinian
- Palazzo Giustinian Pesaro
- Palazzo Giustinian Recanati
- Palazzo Gradenigo
- Palazzo Grassi
- Palazzo Grimani di San Luca
- Palazzo Grimani di Santa Maria Formosa
- Palazzo Labia
- Palazzo Loredan dell'Ambasciatore
- Palazzo Malipiero
- Palazzo Malipiero-Trevisan
- Palazzo Marcello Toderini
- Palazzo Mastelli del Cammello
- Palazzo Memmo Martinengo Mandelli
- Palazzo Michiel del Brusà
- Palazzi Mocenigo
  - Palazzo Mocenigo Casa Nuova
  - Palazzo Mocenigo Casa Vecchia
  - Palazzo Mocenigo detto "il Nero"
- Palazzo Mocenigo Gambara
- Palazzo Molina
- Palazzo Nani
- Palazzo Orio Semitecolo Benzon
- Palazzo Pesaro Orfei
- Palazzo Pisani a San Stefano
- Palazzo Pisani Gritti
- Palazzo Pisani Moretta
- Palazzo delle Prigioni
- Palazzo Priuli Bon
- Palazzo Priuli Manfrin
- Palazzo Priuli Ruzzini Loredan
- Palazzo Priuli Scarpon
- Palazzo Priuli Stazio
- Palazzo Querini Benzon
- Palazzo Rezzonico
- Palazzo Sandi-Porto
- Palazzo Savorgnan
- Palazzo Smith Mangilli Valmarana
- Palazzo Soranzo Van Axel
- Palazzo Soranzo-van Axel-Barozzi
- Palazzo Soranzo Cappello
- Palazzo Soranzo Pisani
- Palazzo Surian
- Palazzo Surian Bellotto
- Palazzo Testa
- Palazzo Tiepolo
- Palazzo Venier Contarini
- Palazzo Vitturi
- Palazzo Widmann
- Palazzo Zorzi Bon
- Pescheria
- Piazza San Marco
- Piazzale Roma
- Piazzetta di San Marco
- Ponte degli Scalzi
- Ponte dei Sospiri
- Ponte dell'Accademia
- Ponte della Costituzione
- Ponte della Libertà
- Ponte della Paglia
- Ponte delle Guglie
- Ponte delle Tette
- Ponte di Rialto
- Ponte Minich
- Ponte Tron
- Procuratie Nuove
- Procuratie Vecchie

== R ==
- Rio di San Lorenzo

== S ==
- Scala Contarini del Bovolo
- Scuola degli Albanesi
- Scuola dei Greci
- Scuola della Carità, home of the Gallerie dell'Accademia
- Scuola di San Giorgio degli Schiavoni
- Scuola di Santa Orsola
- Scuola Grande dei Carmini
- Scuola Grande di San Giovanni Evangelista
- Scuola Grande di San Marco
- Scuola Grande di San Rocco
- Scuola vecchia della Misericordia
- Spanish Synagogue
- Stadio Pier Luigi Penzo
- Strada Nova

== T–Z ==
- Torre dell'Orologio
- Venezia Mestre railway station
- Venezia Santa Lucia railway station
- Via 2 Aprile
- Via 22 Marzo
- Via Garibaldi
- Zecca of Venice

== See also ==
- List of churches in Venice
- Opera houses and theatres of Venice
