= Strada Nova =

Pedestrian thoroughfare in Venice, Italy

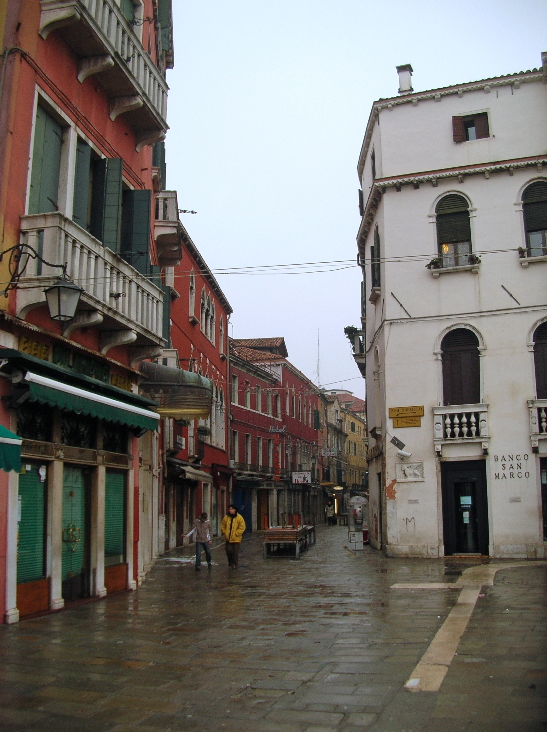
- Entrance to the Lista di Spagna from the Church of the Scalzi
- Interactive map of Strada Nova
- Type: Pedestrian street and rio terà
- Length: 1.7 km (1.1 mi)
- Location: Venice, Italy
- Quarter: Cannaregio
- Postal code: 30121
- Coordinates: 45.441333°N 12.334012°E

Other
- Status: Pedestrian

The Strada Nova is an important pedestrian thoroughfare in Venice, Italy.

It forms the main street axis of the sestiere of Cannaregio, connecting Santa Lucia railway station with Rialto, and ending at Campo dei Santi Apostoli.

Strictly speaking, the name Strada Nova applies only to the final section between Santa Fosca and Campo dei Santi Apostoli. In common usage, however, the name is used for the entire route. The route consists of broad streets connected by bridges, created largely during the 19th century in order to provide a fast pedestrian connection between Rialto and the railway station. Its construction involved demolishing buildings that had previously forced pedestrians to follow a long and winding route through narrow Venetian calli.

== History ==
The Strada Nova in its present form is the result of a series of urban interventions carried out at different times and, in general, not conceived as part of a single comprehensive plan. The exception was the final project completing the connection between Santa Fosca and Campo dei Santi Apostoli.

The first intervention took place in 1818, under Austrian rule, when the Rio dei Do Ponti was filled in along the section between the Ponte delle Guglie and Campo dell'Anconetta. The project was motivated both by concerns over public health and by a desire to revitalise Cannaregio, which at the time was still a relatively peripheral and economically depressed part of Venice. The new pedestrian axis was intended to encourage commerce and local development. Because of its scale, this intervention also shaped all subsequent projects and effectively became the principal point from which later extensions developed.

The second major intervention, also under Austrian rule, took place in 1844, when the Rio dei Sabbioni and Rio dell'Isola were filled in near the Lista di Spagna. This created a broad pedestrian connection from the Church of the Scalzi through Campo San Geremia to the Ponte delle Guglie, effectively extending the earlier project as far as the newly built railway station.

The principal reason for this intervention was the new pattern of movement created by the railway connection with the mainland and the resulting shift in Venice's urban centre of gravity from the San Marco–Castello axis towards the railway station–Rialto axis.

Previously, the inland and northern part of Cannaregio had effectively been a peripheral area, while the centre of commercial and civic activity was concentrated along the Grand Canal and around Rialto, San Marco and the Arsenal. Pedestrian traffic in northern Cannaregio therefore consisted mainly of local residential movement, and there had been little need to simplify or accelerate pedestrian circulation.

The construction of the railway bridge between 1841 and 1846, and the subsequent transformation of the Santa Lucia area into Venice's principal railway terminus for connections with the mainland, radically changed the district's urban function. In the absence of a public water-transport service for passengers, there was a growing need for quick and convenient pedestrian routes between the railway station and Rialto, then the city's main logistical and commercial centre.

The final section of the Strada Nova was planned and built by the Italian government after Venice was annexed to the Kingdom of Italy in 1866.

After prolonged debate, the choice was narrowed to two plans. A project by Niccolò Papadopoli proposed a completely straight road between Campo dei Santi Apostoli and Santa Fosca and would have required extensive demolition. A more flexible plan by Meduna proposed a parallel but narrower route that would be less destructive, largely following the existing street system while straightening, widening and simplifying it.

Papadopoli's project was ultimately selected and built. The new street, originally named after Victor Emmanuel II, was inaugurated on 2 September 1871, completing the pedestrian route between Rialto and the railway station.

The route has an average width of approximately ten metres. Its only significant bottleneck is Calle dell'Anconetta. At the time of construction, it was said that this section was not widened because doing so would have required the demolition of the home of the chief engineer responsible for the municipal works. At times of particularly heavy pedestrian traffic, especially during the Carnival of Venice, Calle dell'Anconetta is sometimes made one-way for pedestrians, with traffic in the opposite direction diverted through other calli. A similar system is used in Salizzada San Giovanni Grisostomo, which connects Campo dei Santi Apostoli with Rialto.

== Route ==
=== From Scalzi to San Geremia (Lista di Spagna) ===
Starting from the railway station, the first section is the rio terà known as the Lista di Spagna, created in 1844 by filling in the former Rio dei Sabbioni.

The street takes its name from the fact that the Spanish ambassador to the Republic of Venice had his residence here, in Palazzo Sceriman, a building now used for offices of the Veneto regional administration.

The term lista derives from the Venetian Republic's practice of marking the residences of foreign ambassadors with lines of Istrian stone. These lines indicated the area within which certain diplomatic privileges and immunities applied.

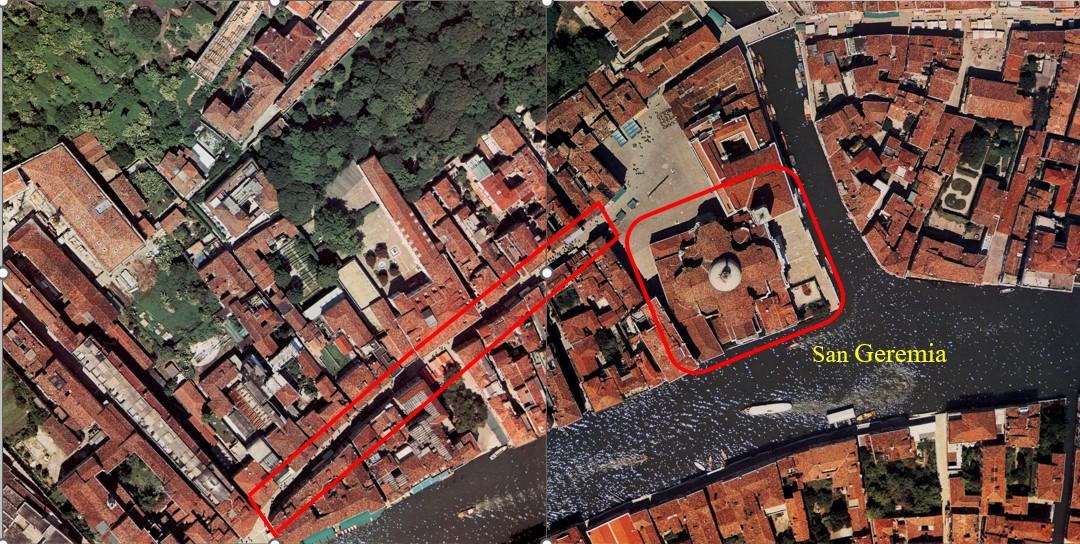
Strada Nova, Lista di Spagna

The Lista di Spagna is characterised by numerous hotels and businesses catering to tourists, although several historically significant buildings also stand along it. The first is Palazzo Calbo Crotta, which underwent numerous alterations between the 15th and 17th centuries and consequently combines architectural elements ranging from Gothic to Baroque. A little further along is Palazzetto da Lezze, a 15th-century building in the Venetian Gothic style.

On the left-hand side, at number 168, the building of Palazzo Sceriman contains the Istituto Orfanotrofio Manin, an orphanage established through a substantial bequest from Ludovico Manin, the final Doge of Venice. Further along, on the right-hand side at number 233, is a 15th-century Gothic portal that was later used as an entrance to Palazzo Morosini dalla Tressa.

At the end of the Lista di Spagna is Campo San Geremia and the church of San Geremia, which houses the remains of Saint Lucy of Syracuse. Her relics were originally kept in the church of Santa Lucia, which stood beside the Grand Canal and was demolished in 1860 when the government decided to enlarge Venice's railway station, which continues to bear the saint's name.

Because of its large size, during the period of the Venetian Republic Campo San Geremia was often used for ball games and bull races. Palazzo Labia also faces the campo. The palace houses the Veneto regional headquarters of RAI and contains frescoes by Giovanni Battista Tiepolo.

Salizzada San Geremia then leads to the Ponte delle Guglie, which crosses the Cannaregio Canal.

=== From San Geremia to Rio di Noale ===
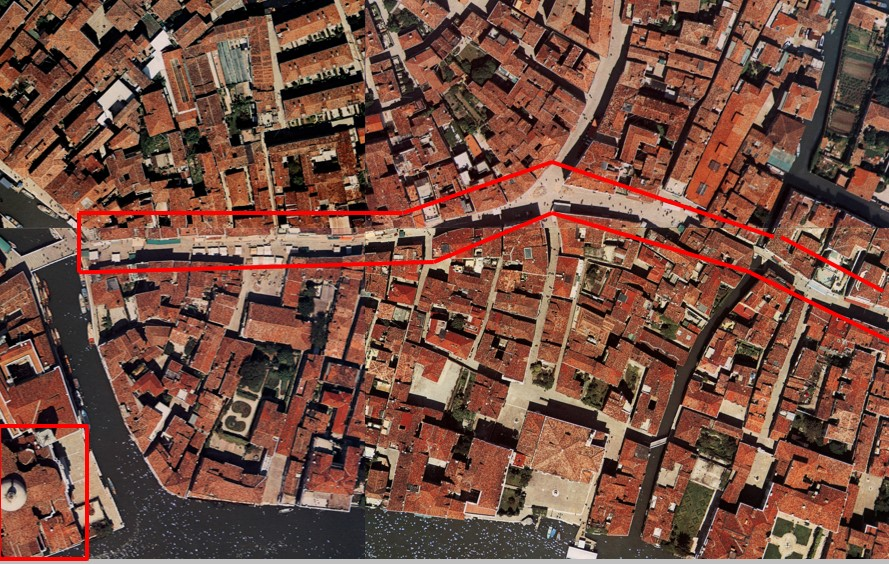
Rio Terà San Leonardo

After crossing the Ponte delle Guglie, the route enters Rio Terà San Leonardo. On the right, opening onto a small square, stands the former church of San Leonardo. It was deconsecrated under the Napoleonic suppressions of religious institutions and later became the first home of the Scuola della Carità.

Rio Terà San Leonardo ends at the broad Campiello dell'Anconetta, immediately before the route's principal bottleneck, Calle dell'Anconetta. The street crosses the bridge of the same name and continues into Rio Terà della Maddalena.

Rio Terà della Maddalena appears to have been one of the earliest examples in Venice of a canal being filled in to create a street; according to Lorenzetti, the work took place as early as 1398.

Immediately after crossing the Ponte dell'Anconetta, a broad calle on the right leads to the rear entrance of Ca' Vendramin Calergi, whose principal façade faces the Grand Canal. The palace was the residence of Richard Wagner during the final years of his life, and he died there in 1883. It is also the winter home of the Venice Casino.

On the left, at number 2343, stand the Gothic Palazzo Contin, dating from the 15th century, and the later Palazzo Donà dalle Rose, dating from the 17th century.

At the end of the rio terà is Campo della Maddalena and the circular church of La Maddalena. A small fortified residence known as the Castello dei Baffo once stood on the campo. Its tower was subsequently used as the bell tower of the church until 1881, when a new structure was constructed to house the bells.

After crossing the Ponte Sant'Antonio, the route immediately reaches the large Campo Santa Fosca on the left. It contains a monument to Paolo Sarpi and the façade of the church of Santa Fosca, which was rebuilt in 1679 and extensively altered again in 1733 following a fire. Opposite the right-hand side of the church stands the 15th-century Palazzo Correr, a Gothic building with 18th-century additions.

A short distance beyond Palazzo Correr, also on the right, stands Farmacia Ponci, which is still in operation and is traditionally regarded as Venice's oldest pharmacy. It retains its 17th-century interior layout, comprising an entrance hall and the pharmacy itself, as well as original carved walnut furnishings and 18th-century glass and maiolica containers for medicines and herbs.

At the end of this section, the route reaches the Rio di Noale and the Ponte Nicolò Pasqualigo, built in 1870. On the left stands the façade of Palazzo Donà Giovanelli, a Gothic palace dating from the first half of the 15th century, distinguished by paired windows at the corner and a prominent central window composition.

=== From Rio di Noale to Santi Apostoli ===
After crossing the Rio di Noale, the church of San Felice stands on the left. One of Venice's oldest churches, it was founded in the 10th century, rebuilt in the 13th century and extensively renovated again during the early 16th century.

Immediately after the church is the Ponte San Felice. Here begins the final section of the route, which is officially the part specifically named Strada Nova.

The second calle on the right leads to the entrance of the Ca' d'Oro, whose principal façade faces the Grand Canal.

A little further along, on the left, is the church of Santa Sofia. The church has no visible independent façade, as its structure, including the bell tower, is almost completely absorbed into the surrounding buildings. Its entrance is also difficult to distinguish from the neighbouring private doorways.

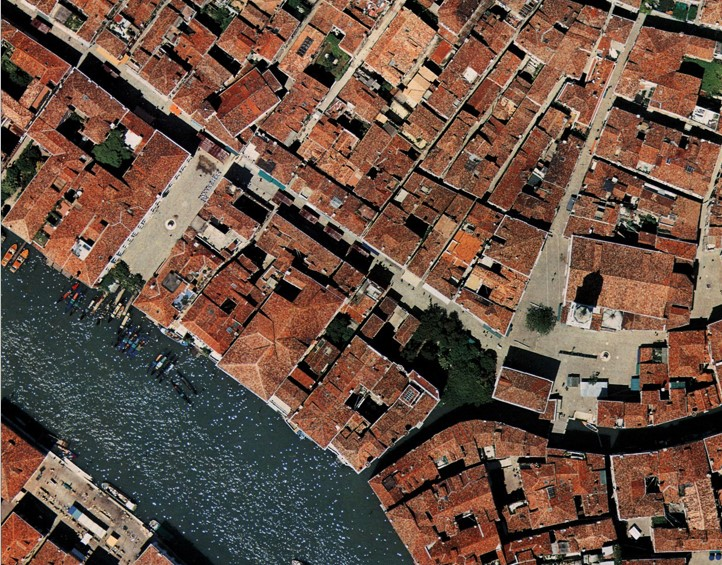
Strada Nova near Santa Sofia and Santi Apostoli

Opposite Santa Sofia, on the right, is Campo Santa Sofia, one of the relatively few Venetian campi with direct access to the Grand Canal. Palazzo Sagredo stands on the campo, with its main façade facing the canal. Its interior includes works by Sebastiano Ricci.

A little further along, also on the right, is the entrance to Palazzo Michiel dalle Colonne, whose façade faces the Grand Canal. The palace formerly housed an important private collection that included works by Giovanni Bellini, including Pietà and Madonna and Child between Saint John the Baptist and a Female Saint, now held by the Gallerie dell'Accademia.

Near the end of the street, immediately before Campo dei Santi Apostoli, stands the 18th-century Scuola dell'Angelo Custode on the right. Attributed to Andrea Tirali, the building became a Lutheran church serving Venice's German community after the suppression of the Fondaco dei Tedeschi in 1812. The Scuola contains works by Sebastiano Ricci and a Christ Blessing attributed to the school of Titian, transferred there from the Fondaco dei Tedeschi.

The route ends in the broad Campo dei Santi Apostoli, dominated by the church of Santi Apostoli.

== Churches and palaces ==
Travelling from the railway station towards Campo dei Santi Apostoli, the following churches are situated along the route:

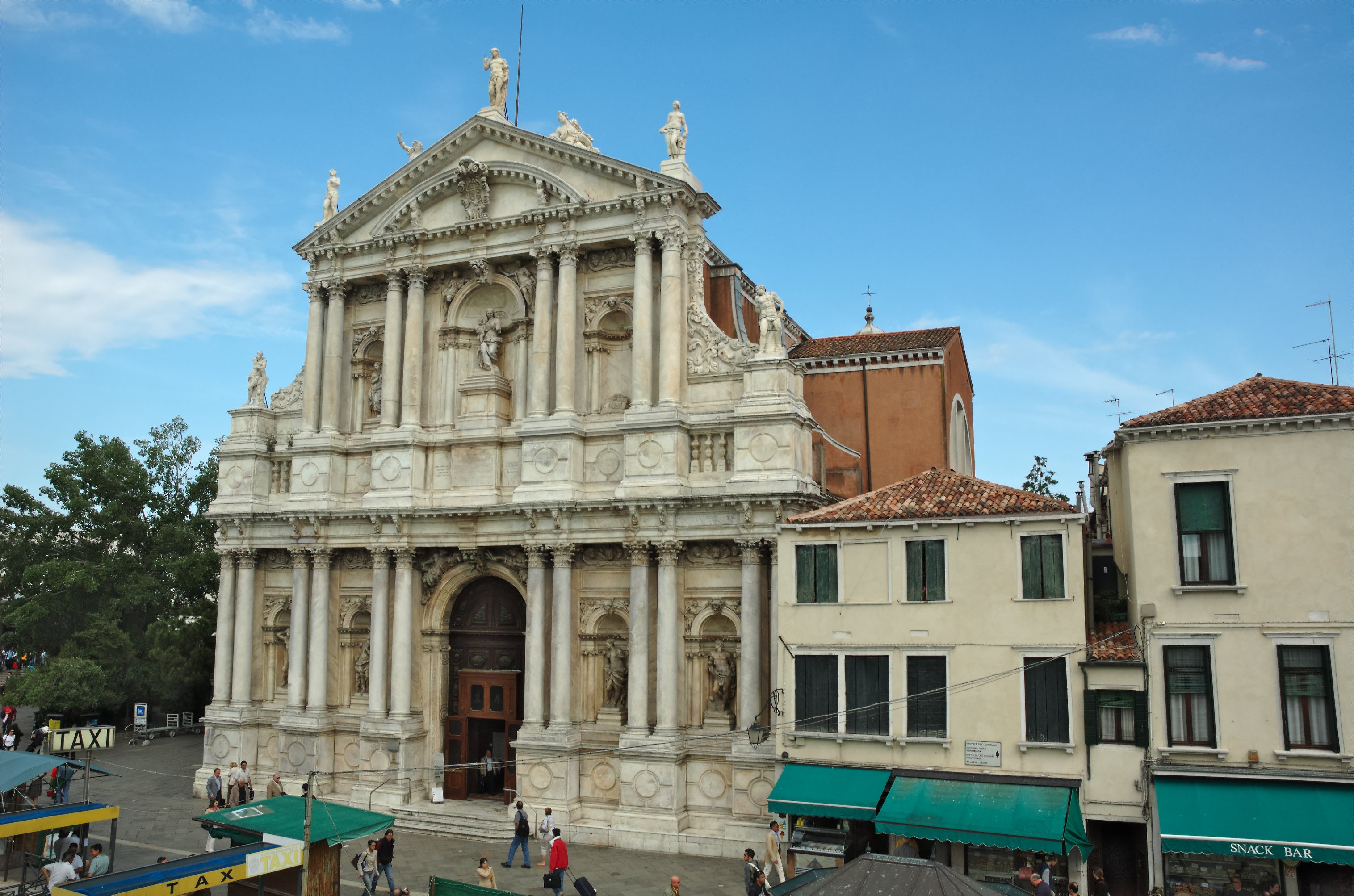
Santa Maria di Nazareth, also known as the Scalzi, immediately before the beginning of the Lista di Spagna

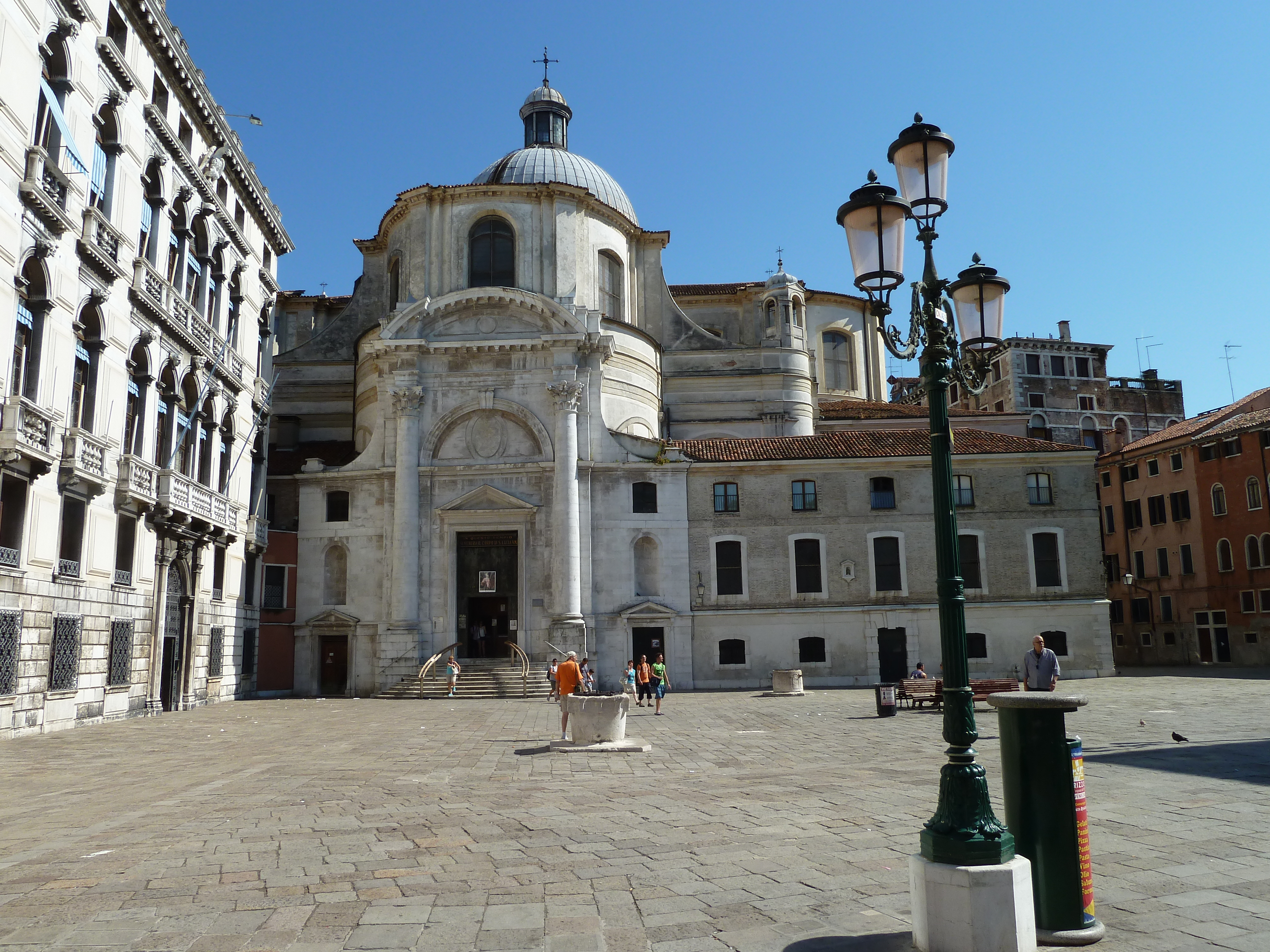
San Geremia

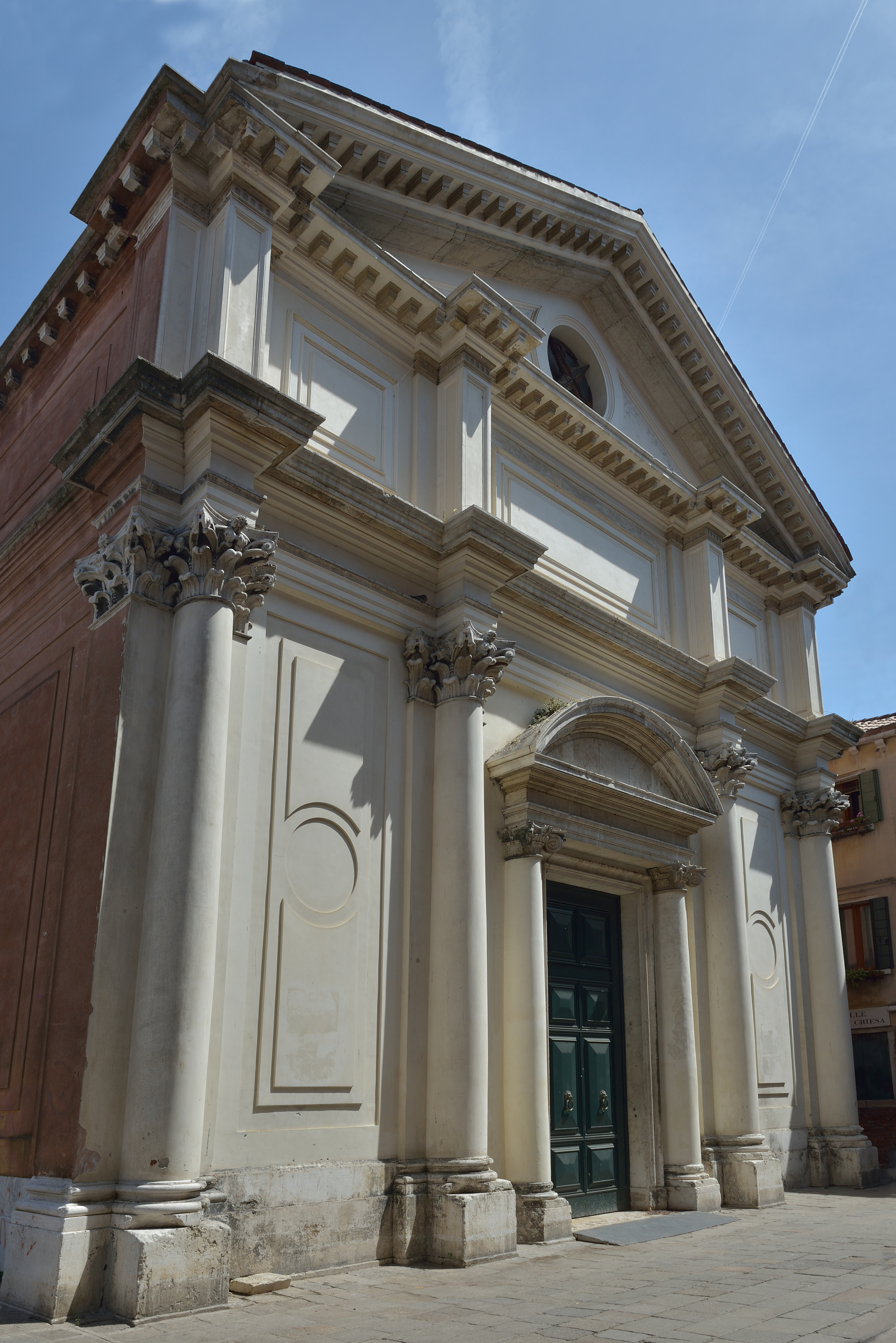
San Leonardo, now deconsecrated

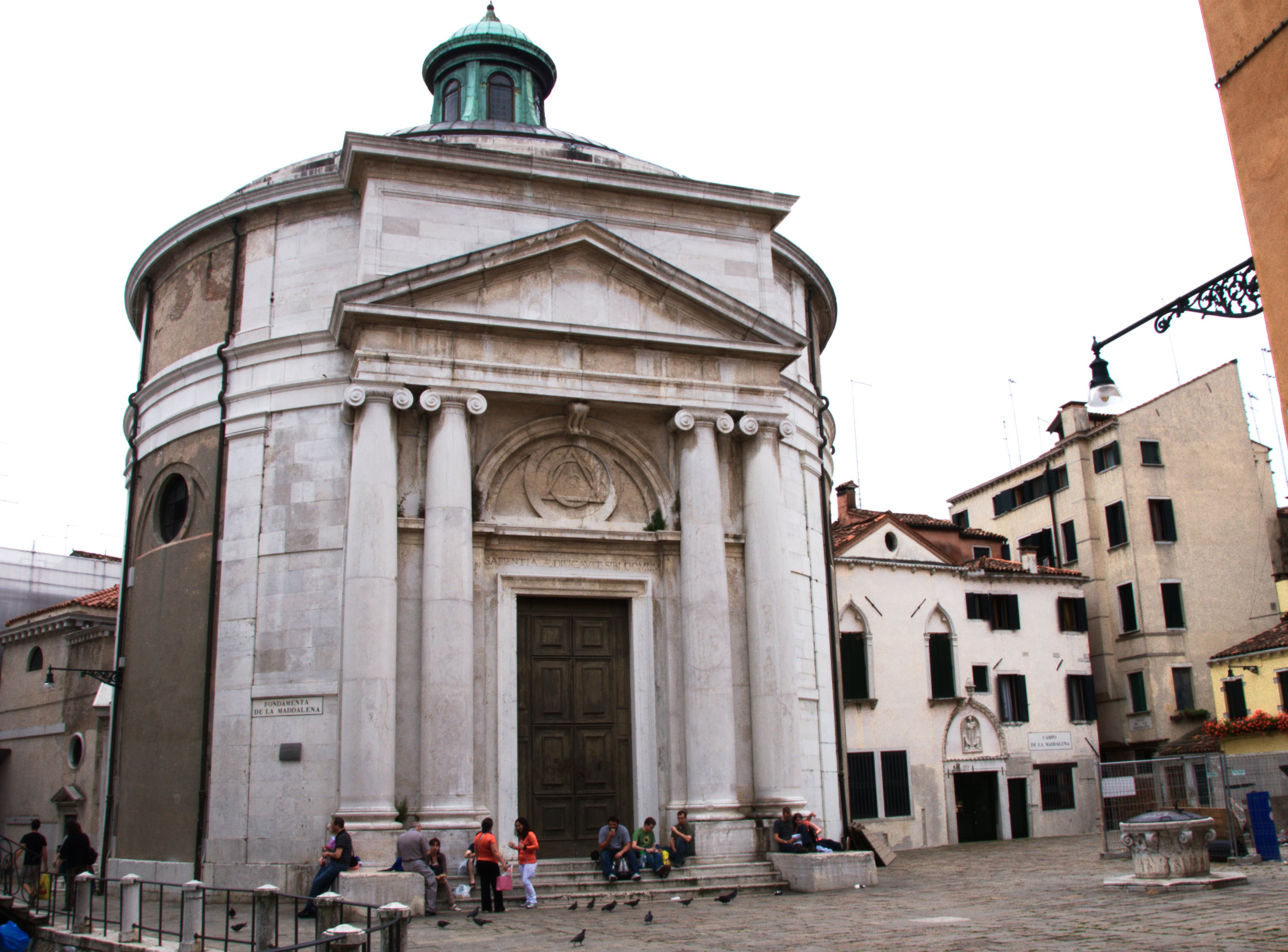
La Maddalena

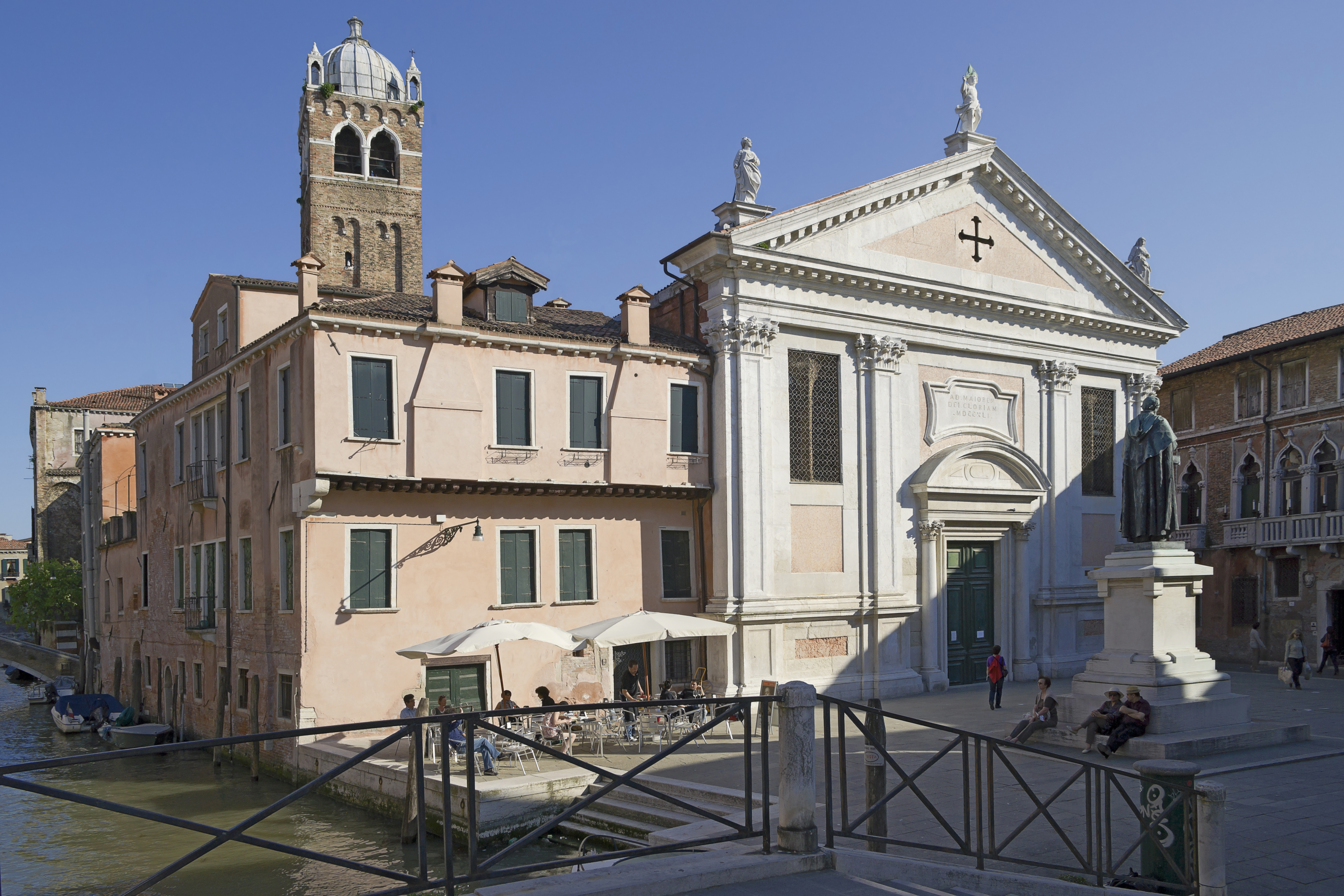
Santa Fosca

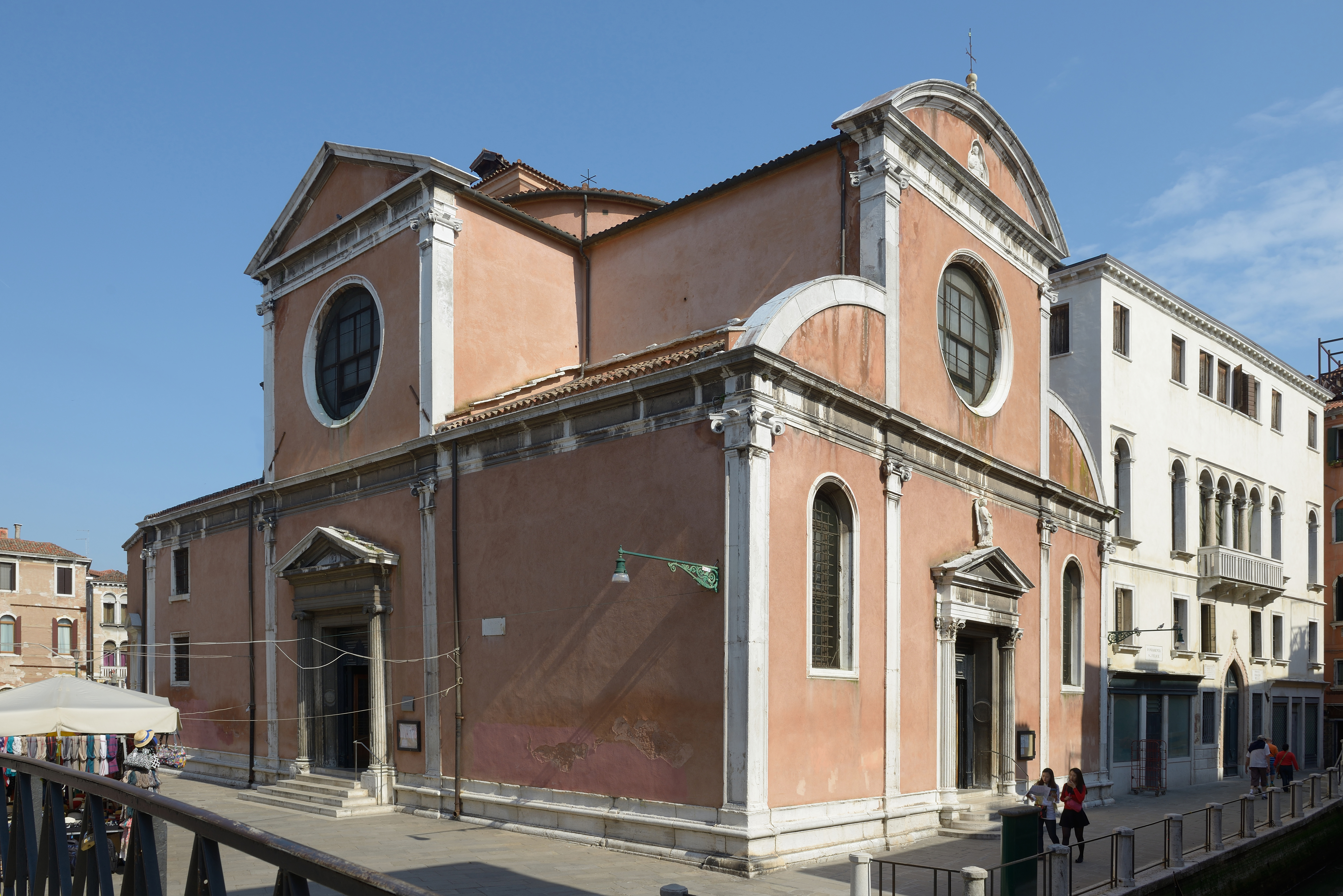
San Felice

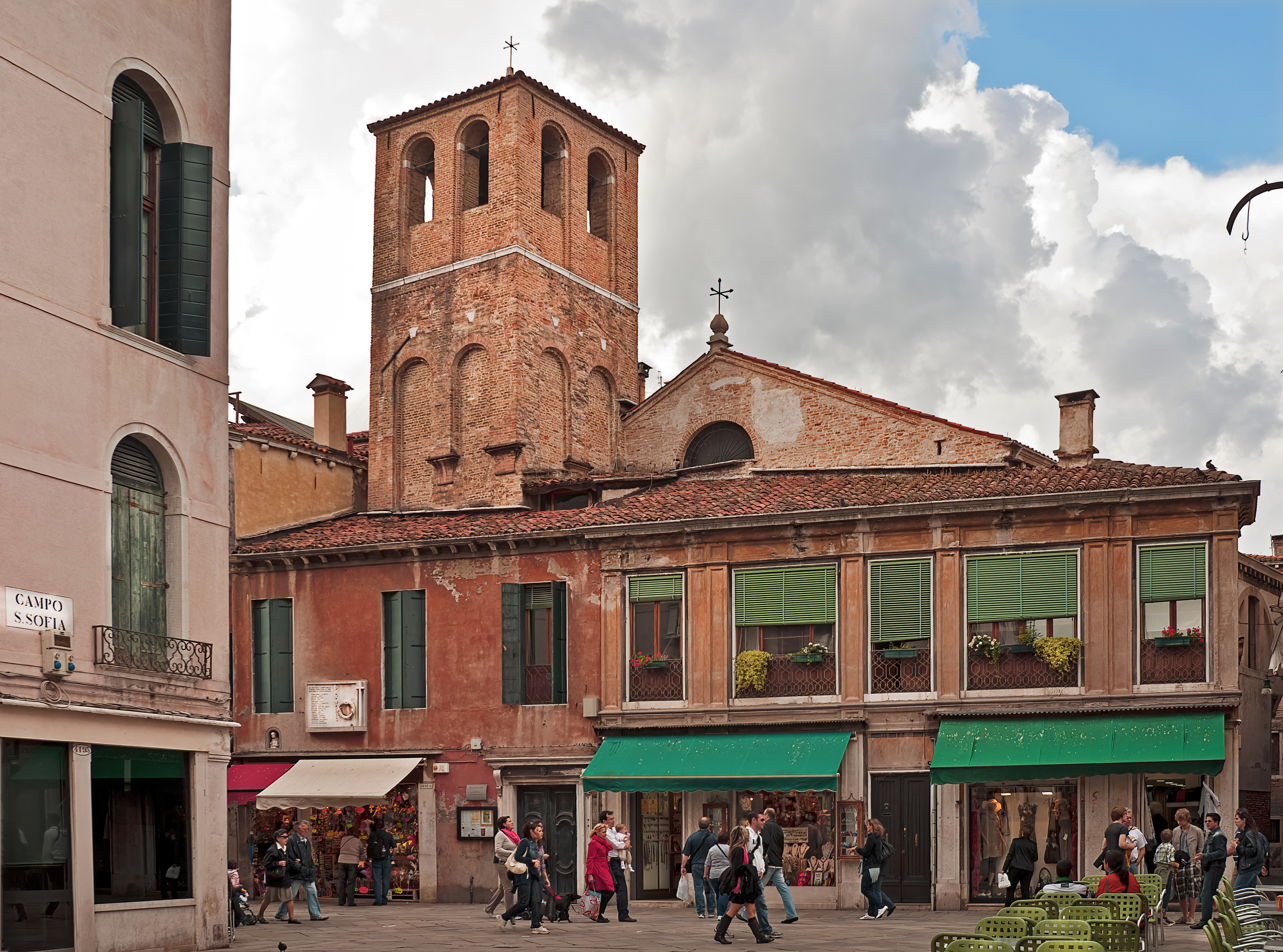
Santa Sofia

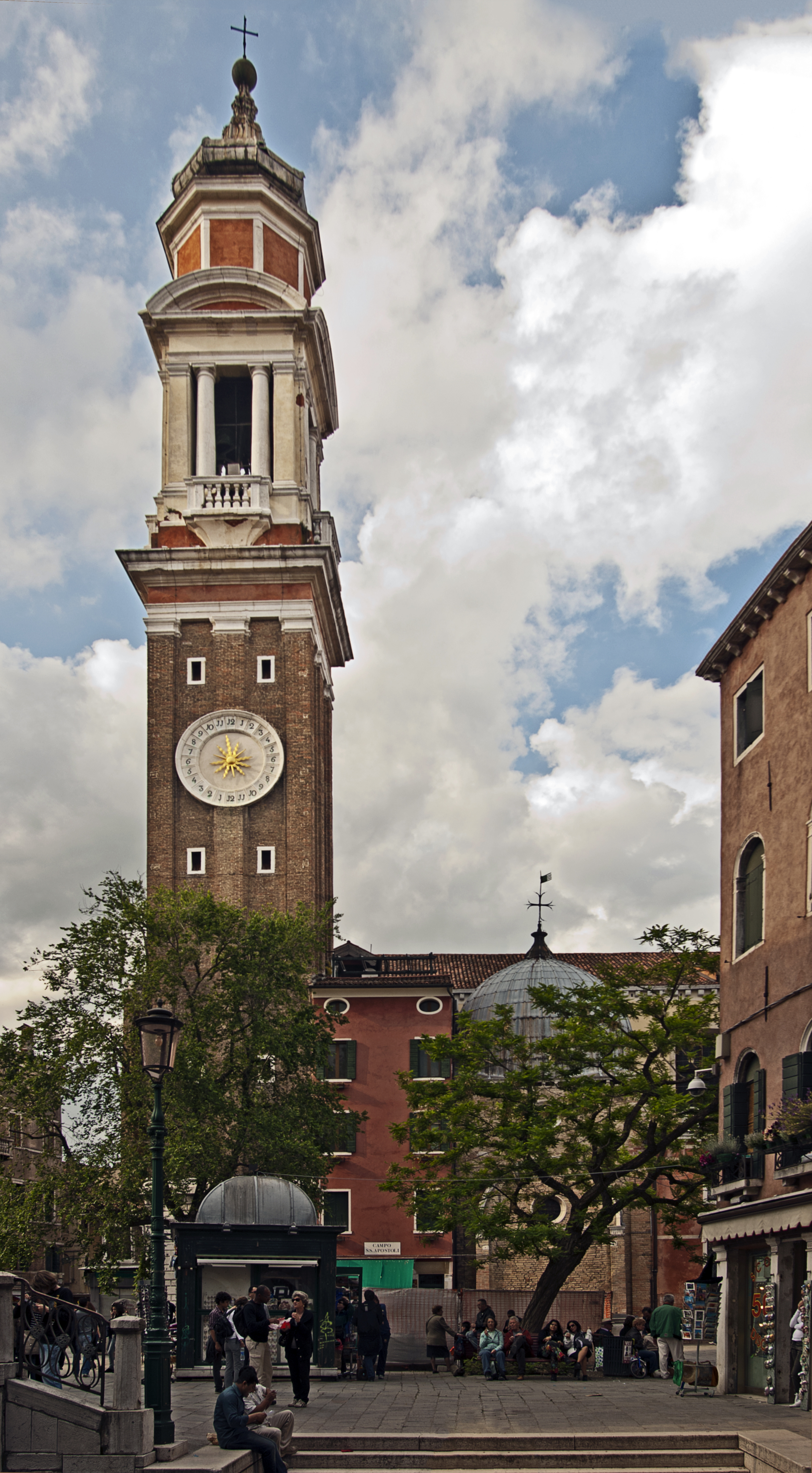
Santi Apostoli, at the end of the route

The following palaces either face the Strada Nova directly or have entrances on it while their principal façades face the Grand Canal:

- Palazzo Calbo Crotta
- Palazzetto da Lezze
- Palazzo Zeno
- Palazzo Labia
- Palazzo della Torre
- Ca' Vendramin Calergi — façade on the Grand Canal
- Palazzo Contin
- Palazzo Donà dalle Rose
- Palazzo Correr
- Palazzo Donà Giovanelli
- Entrance to the Ca' d'Oro via a side calle
- Palazzo Sagredo — façade on the Grand Canal
- Palazzo Michiel dalle Colonne — façade on the Grand Canal

== Gallery ==
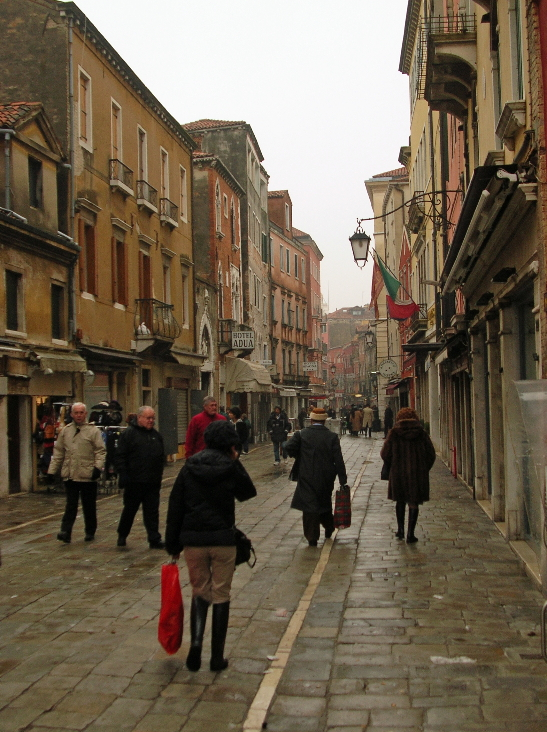
Lista di Spagna from Campo San Geremia

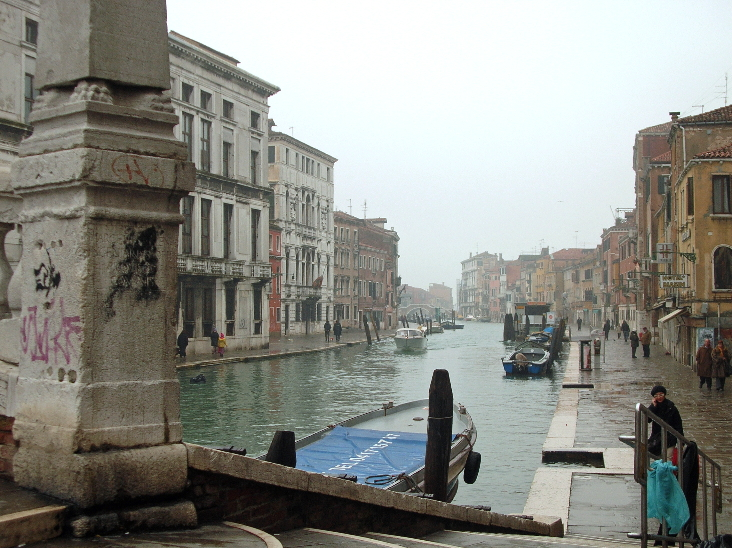
Cannaregio Canal from the Ponte delle Guglie

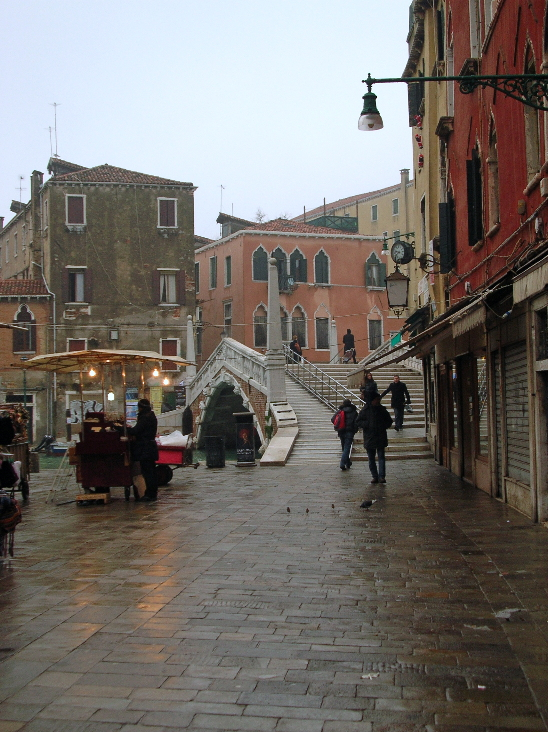
Ponte delle Guglie from Rio Terà San Leonardo

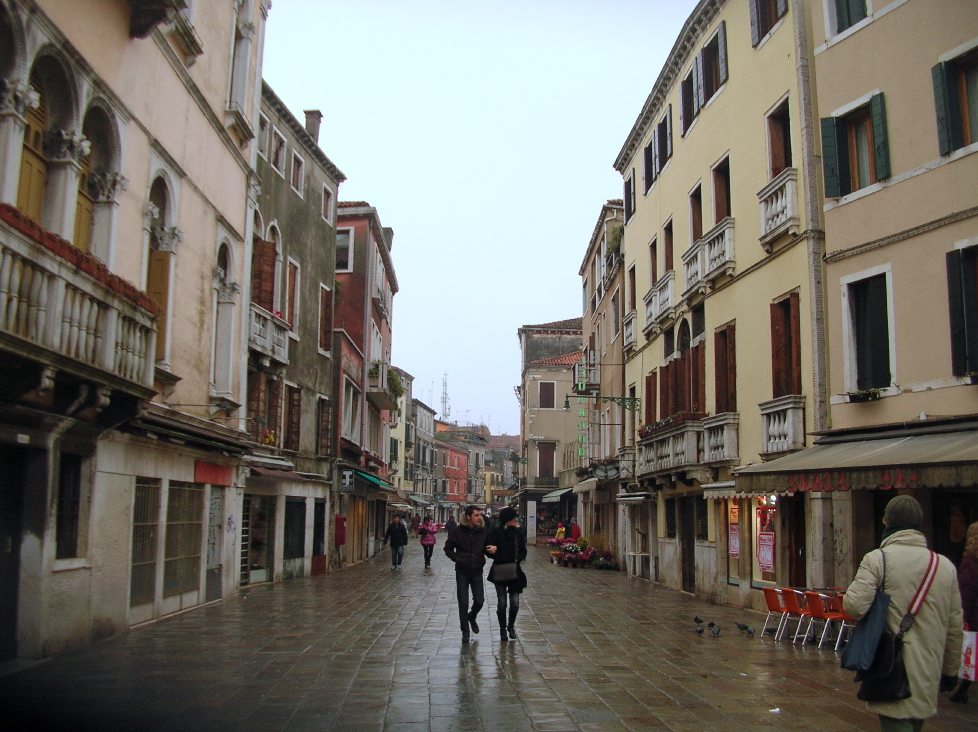
Rio Terà San Leonardo

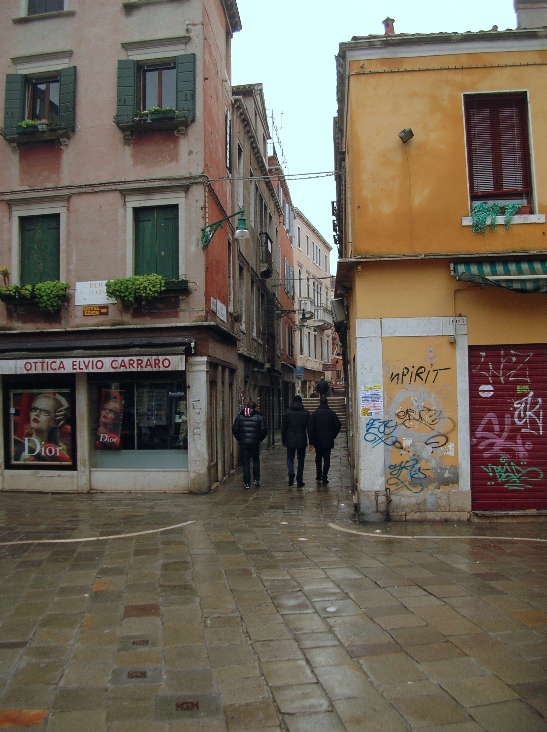
The narrow section at Calle dell'Anconetta

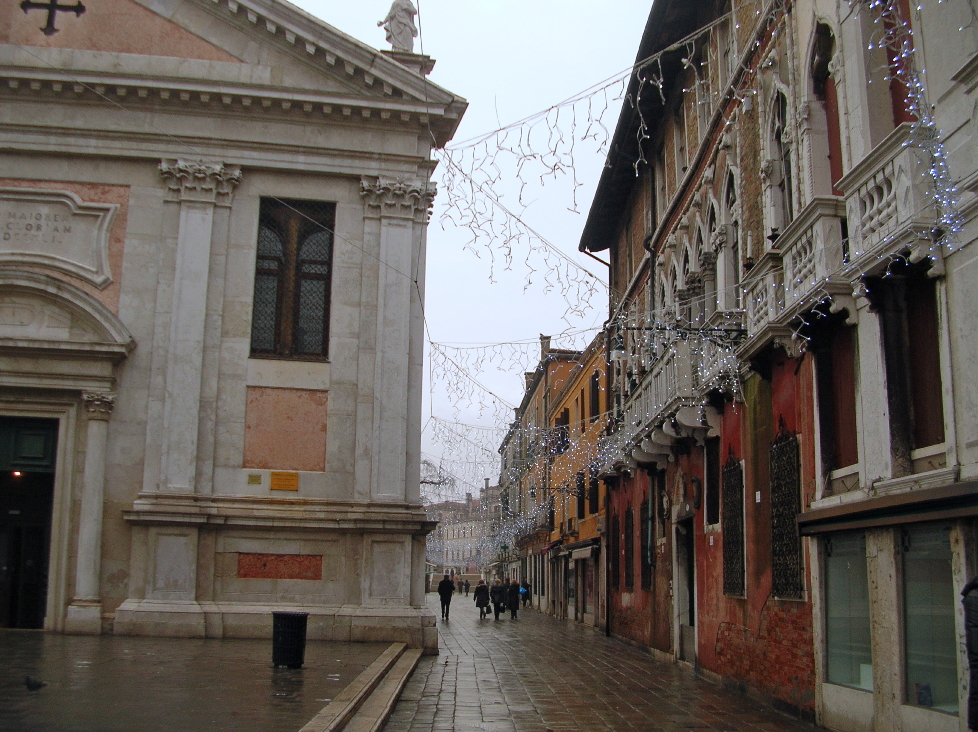
Strada Nova at Santa Fosca

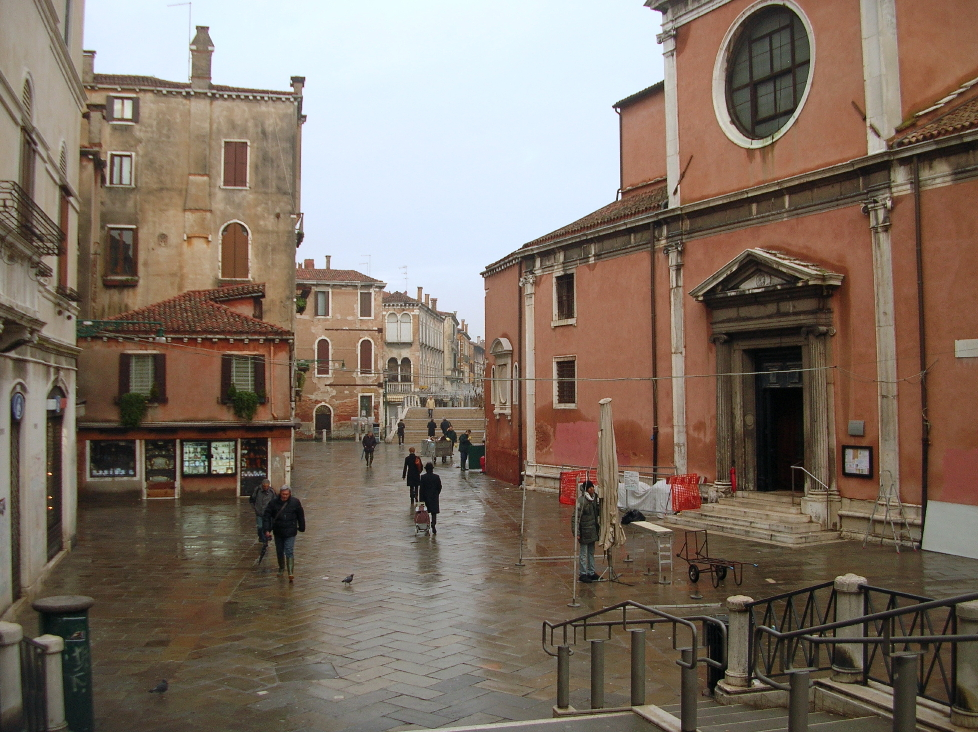
Strada Nova at San Felice

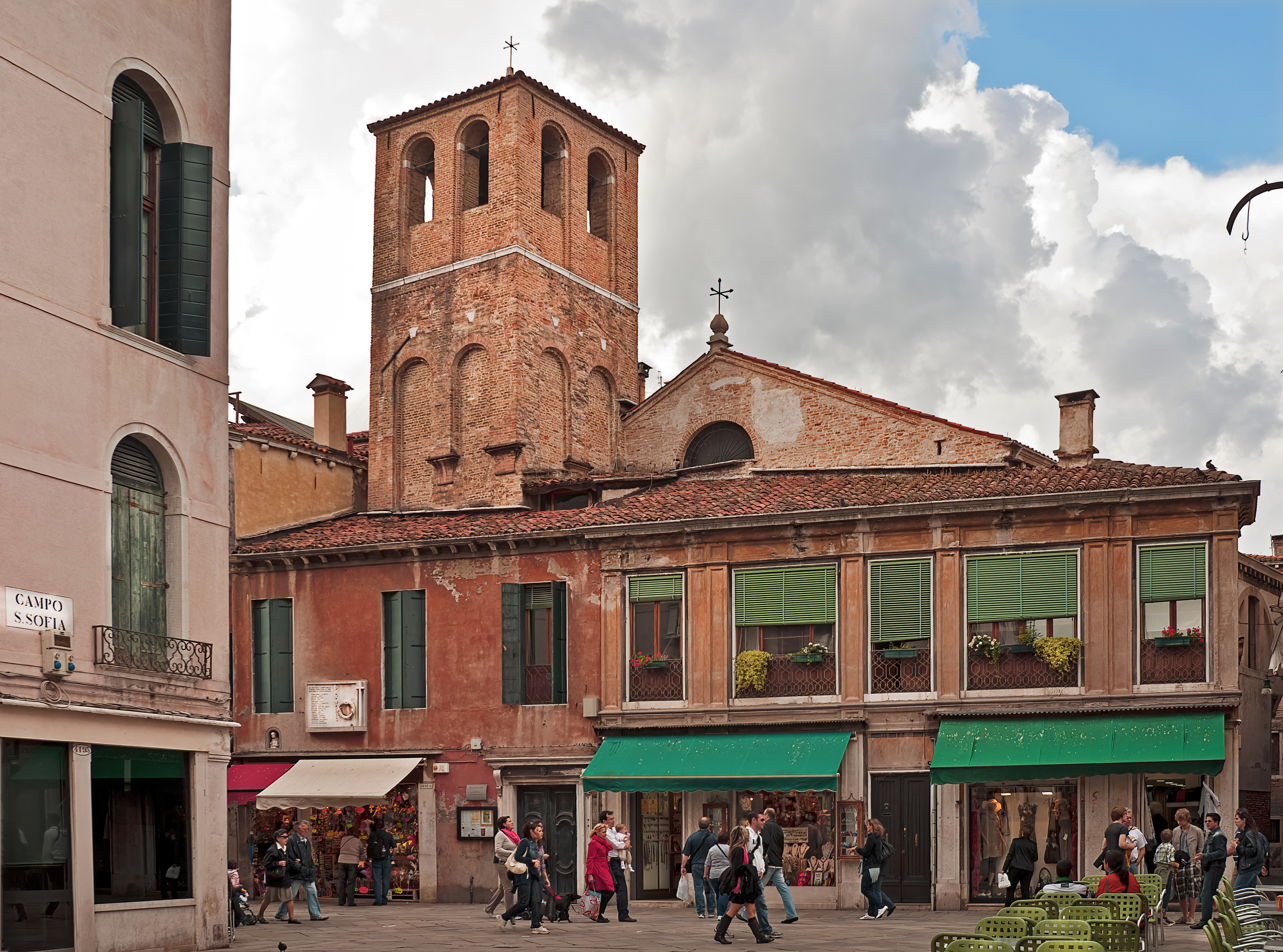
Strada Nova from Campo Santa Sofia

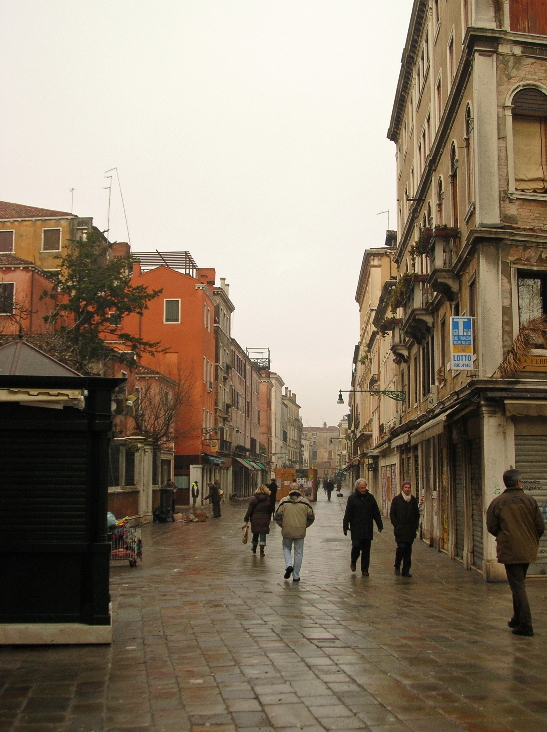
Entrance to the Strada Nova from Campo dei Santi Apostoli

== Bibliography ==
- Lorenzetti, Giulio (1974). Venezia e il suo estuario (in Italian). Trieste: Edizioni Lint.
- Romanelli, G. (1977). Venezia Ottocento (in Italian). Rome: Officina edizioni.
- Lazzari, Corrado (2021). Strada Nova, dintorni ... e un mio itinerario (in Italian). Padua: Cleup. ISBN 978-88-5495-419-9.
