= Calbo family =

Italian noble mercantile family

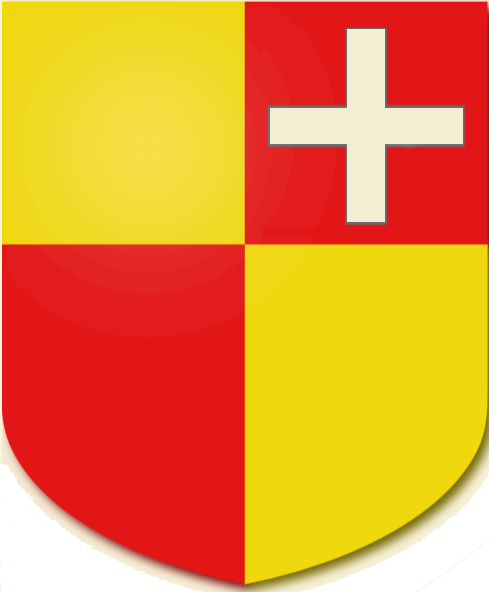
Calbo family coat of arms

The Calbo family later on Calbo-Crotta is an Italian noble mercantile family originating from Padua and then established in Venice starting the year 891. It became part of the Great Council of Venice (Italian: Maggior Consiglio) after the battle of Genoa in 1310. They were given nobility title in 1817 and were part of Venetian nobility.

== Notable members ==
- Luigi Calbo, an administrator in the kingdom of Negroponte and who died during the conquests of Mehmed the Conqueror (Mehmed II) in 1470
- Antonio Calbo, a councilor in Kingdom of Candia in 1539, and fought for the withdrawals of the Turkish occupation
- Francesco Calbo (1760-1827), son of Giovanni Marco and Lucrezia Crotta. He added the name Crotta to the family known after that as Calbo-Crotta. He was a finance minister under the Austrian rule that became the Austrian Empire in 1818. He died without inheritors.

== Residences ==
- Palazzo Calbo Crotta in Venice

== Sources ==
- Dizionario Storico-Portatile Di Tutte Le Venete Patrizie Famiglie, G.Bettinelli, Venezia, 1780.
- Nouvelle relation de la Ville et République de Venise, Casimir Freschot, Utrecht, 1709, ed. Guillaume Van Poolsum.
- Repertorio Genealogico delle Famiglie confermate nobili e dei titolati nobili esistenti nelle provincie Venete, Francesco Schröder, Venise, 1830, tipografia Alvisopoli.
- Saggio sulla Storia Civile, Politica, Ecclesiastica e sulla Corografia e Topografia degli Stati della Repubblica di Venezia ad uso della Nobile e Civile Gioventù, Ab. D. Cristoforo Tentori Spagnuolo, Venise, Éd. Giacomo Storti, 1785.
