= Palazzo Albrizzi =

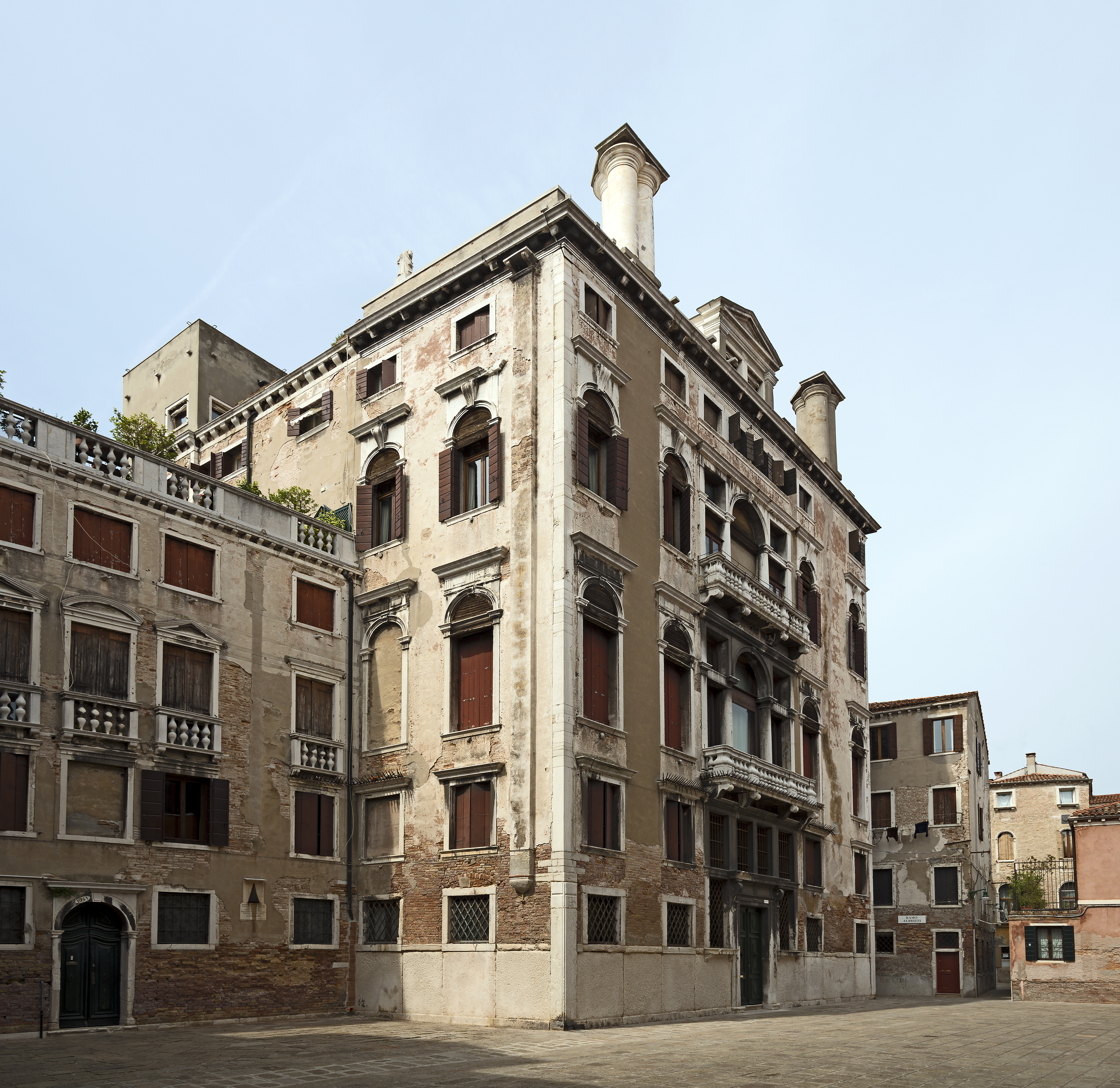
- Interactive map of the Palazzo Albrizzi area
- Alternative names: Palazzo Bonomo Albrizzi

General information
- Architectural style: Baroque
- Location: San Polo, Venice, Italy
- Coordinates: 45°26′18.33″N 12°19′51.11″E
- Owner: Rubin de Cervin-Albrizzi family

The Palazzo Albrizzi (also known as Palazzo Bonomo Albrizzi) is a palace in Venice, located in the sestieri of San Polo, near the Ponte delle Tette as well as the Campo San Polo and the Sant'Aponal.

== History ==
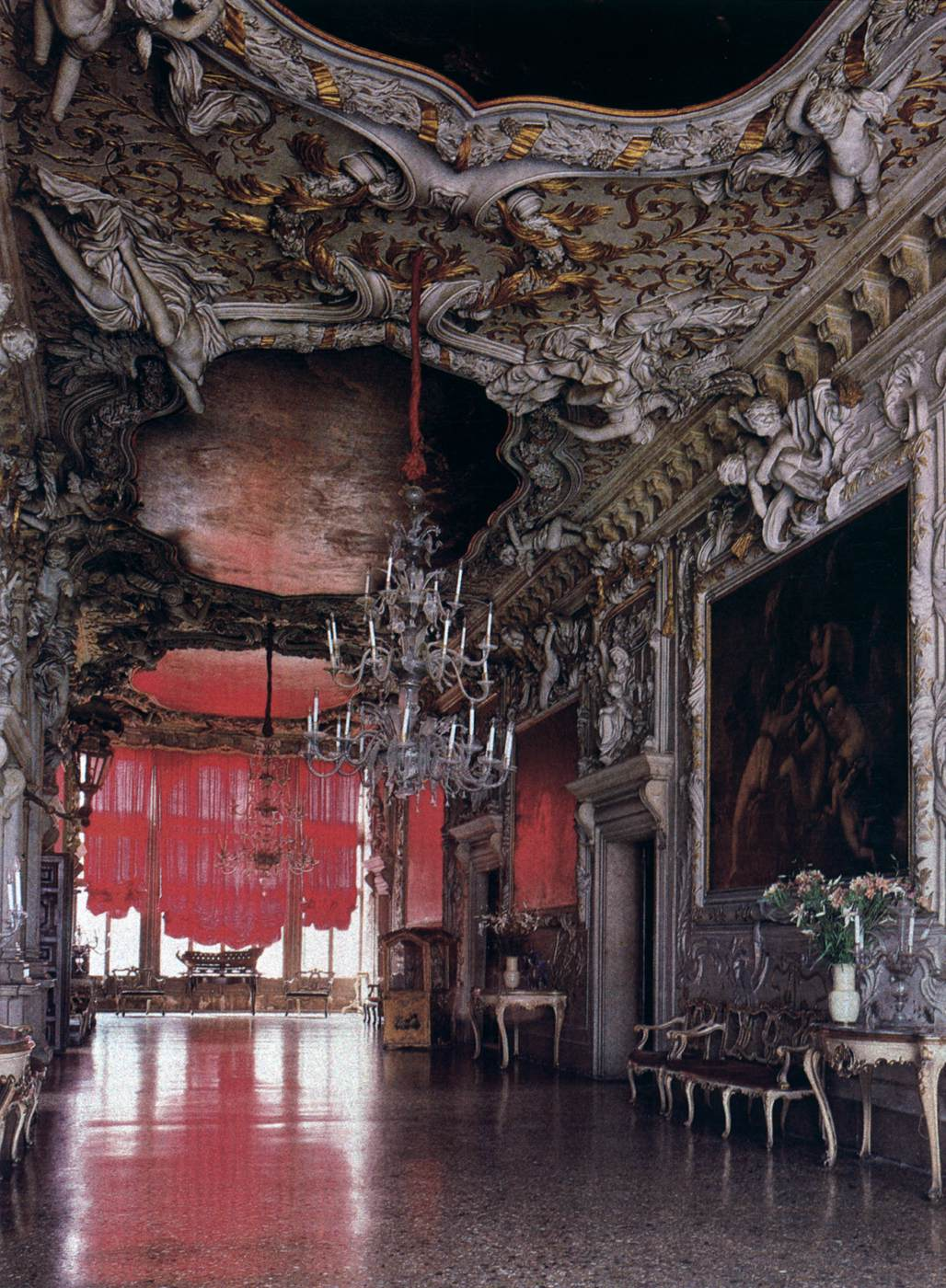
The portego on the first floor.

The palace was built here by order of the Bonomo family, at the end of the 16th century. In 1648, part of the building was purchased by Maffeo II Albrizzi. In 1667 the Albrizzi were admitted to the Venetian nobility, and in 1692 the entire palace became the property of Maffeo's sons: Giovan Battista, Antonio, Giuseppe and Alessandro.

== Architecture ==
Casa Albrizzi preserves an important historical archive which also includes documents relating to the family's Tyrolean possessions, in particular those relating to the Castel d'Enna in Etschtal.

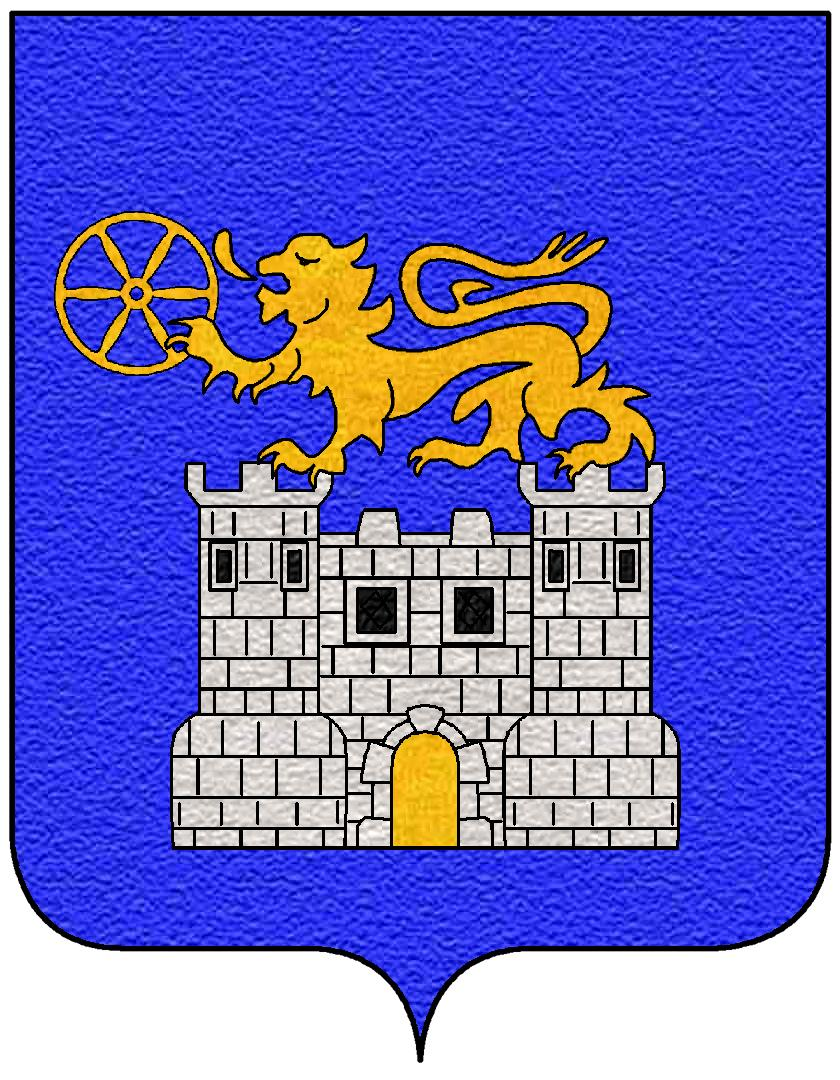
Albrizzi coat of arms

== Bibliography ==
- Guida d'Italia – Venezia (3 ed.). Milano: Touring Editore. 2007. ISBN 978-88-365-4347-2.
