= Ponte Tron, Venice =

Arch bridge in Venice, Italy

Coordinates: 45°26′05″N 12°20′11″E

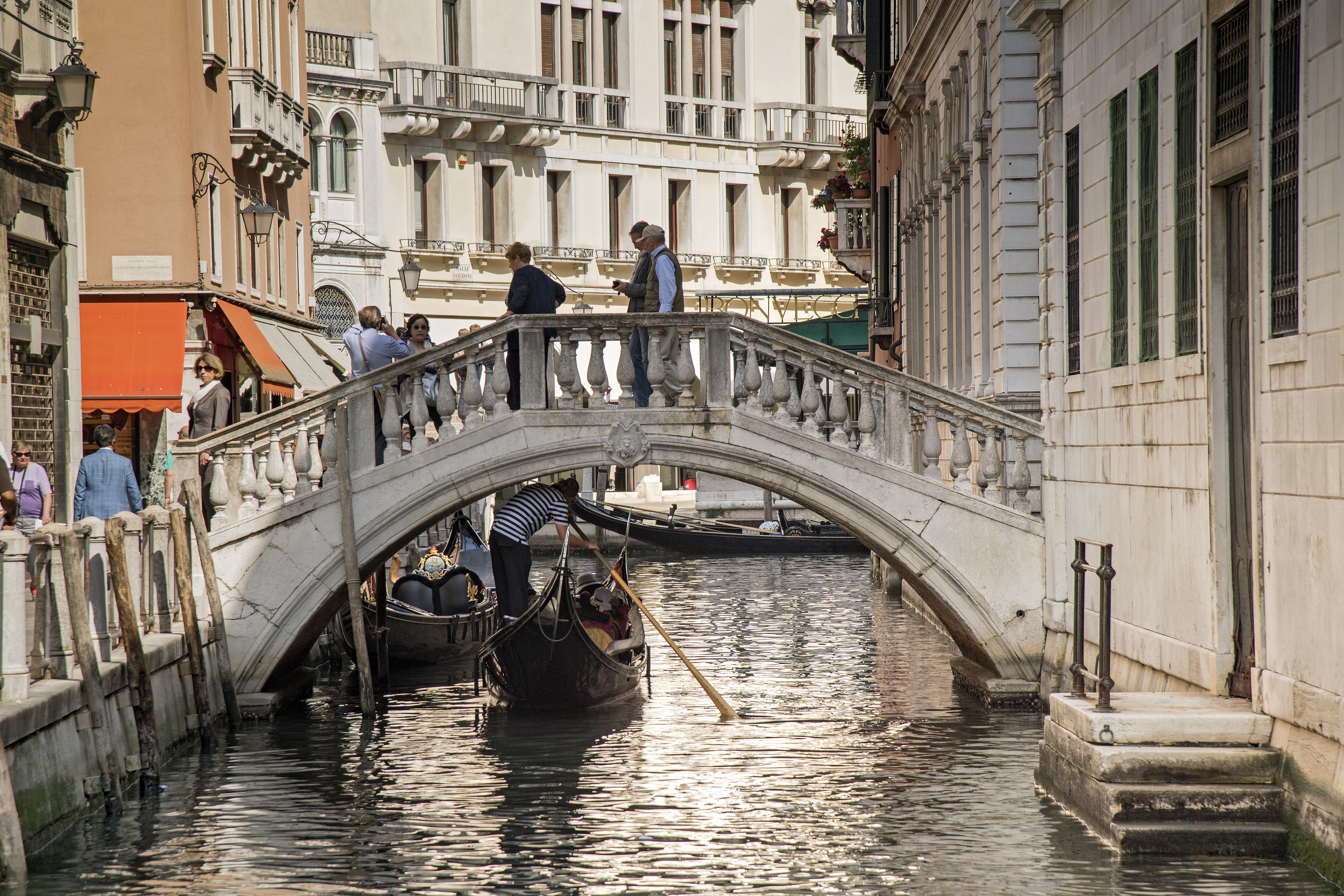
Ponte Tron

The Ponte Tron or Ponte de la Piavola, near Piazza San Marco in Venice spans the Rio Orseolo near the Bacino Orseolo. It is one of more than 400 bridges that connect the archipelago of 118 islands divided by about 150 canals and narrow rivers in the shallow Venetian lagoon. The lion's head of Saint Mark appears on the cartouche at the center of the arch. In spite of its traditional construction in the salt-white Istrian stone used elsewhere in Venice and the classic vase profiles of the balustrade, this bridge, called la piavola, the "doll's bridge" in Venetian, for its diminutive size, was built at the late date of 1840.
