= San Felice, Venice =

Church building in Venice, Italy

San Felice
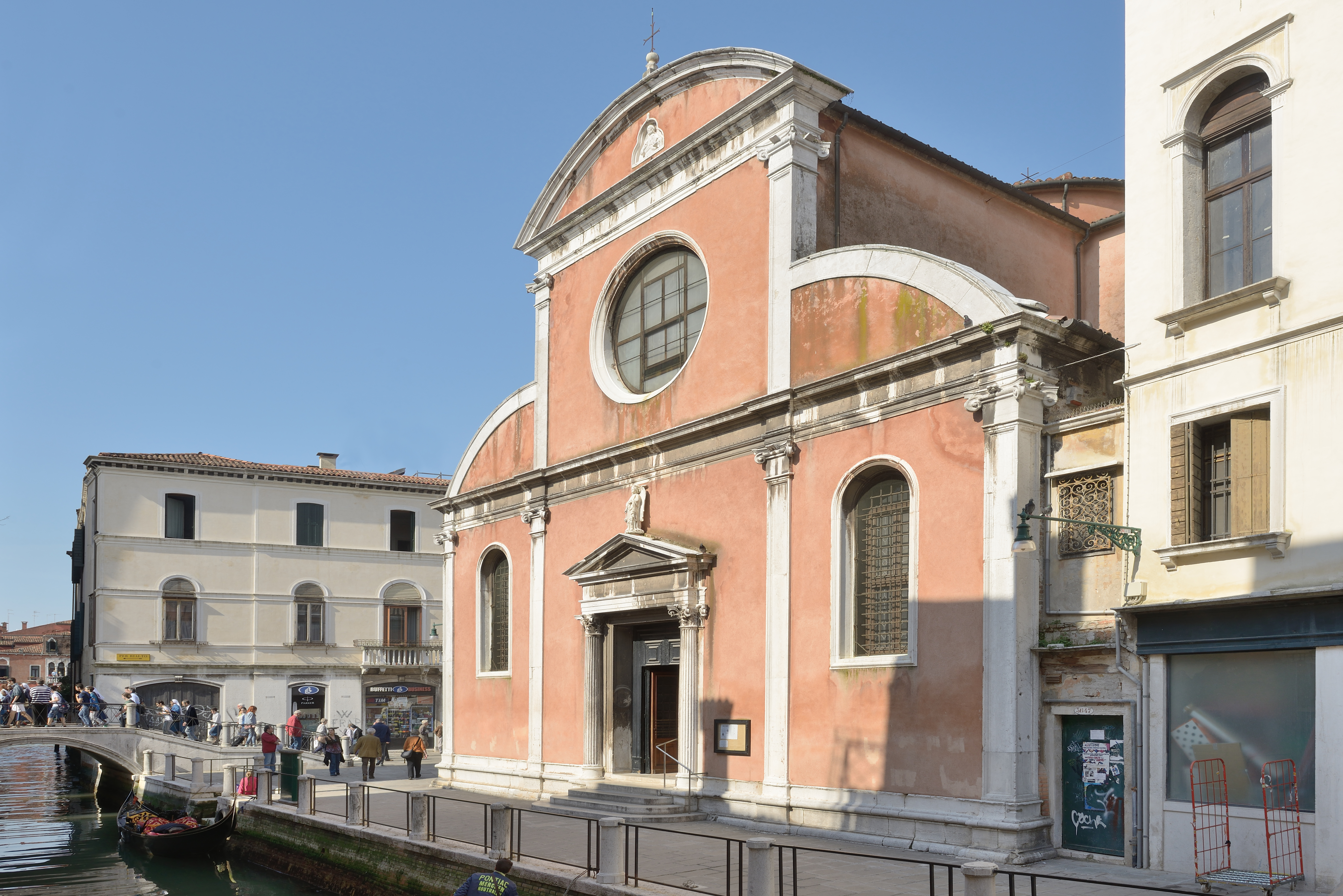
- San Felice in Venice

- Location within Venice Location within Italy

Religion
- Affiliation: Roman Catholic
- Province: Venice

Location
- Location: Venice, Italy
- Coordinates: 45°26′30″N 12°20′00″E

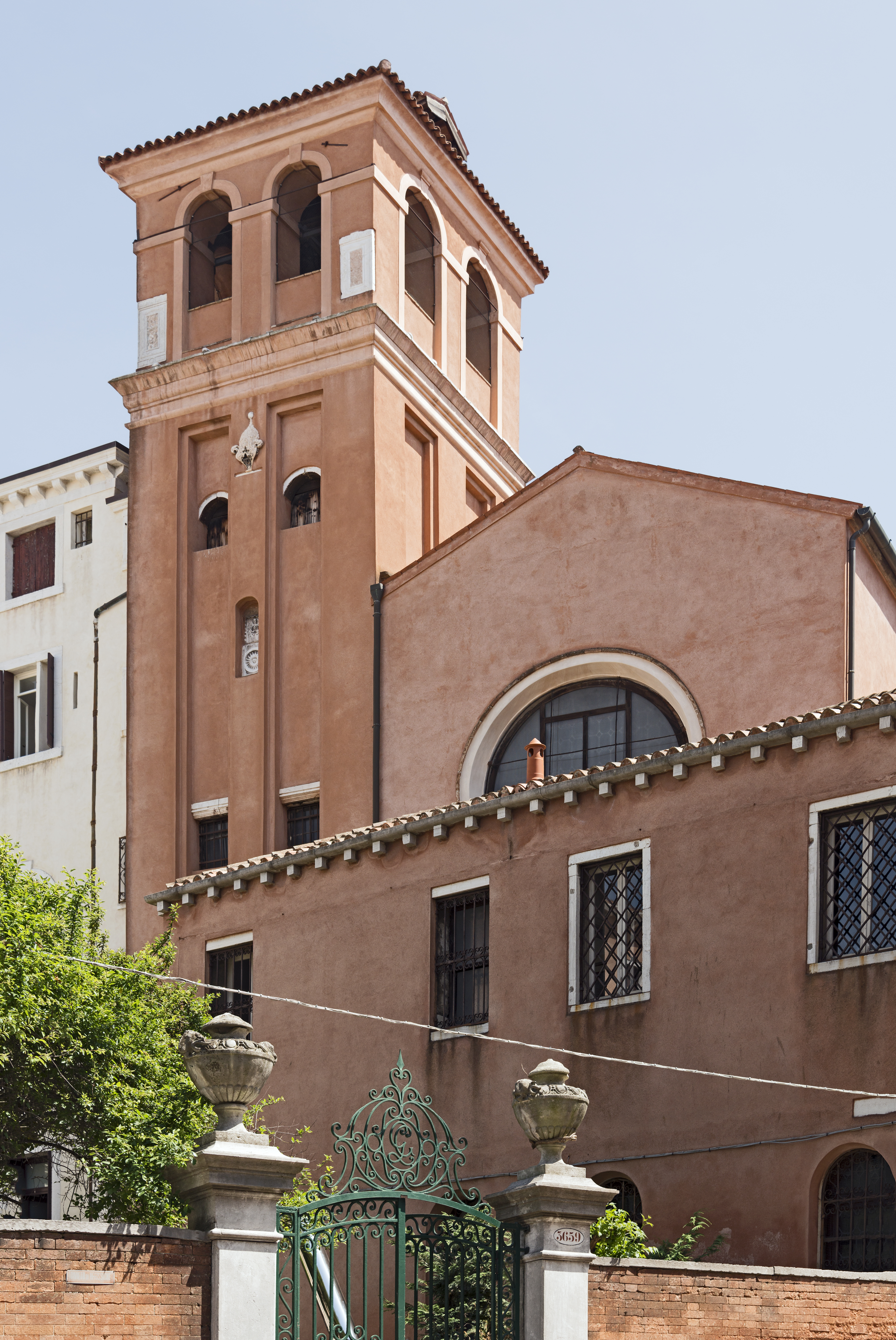
Bell tower

San Felice is a church in Venice, northern Italy, located in the sestiere (district) of Cannaregio. It faces the eponymous campo (square), across the Strada Nova.

It was founded in the 10th century, although the first document mentioning it dates to 1117. It was reconsecrated in 1267 by the patriarch of Caorle and Jesolo after it had been deeply renewed. Starting from 1531, it was completely rebuilt in the style of Mauro Codussi.

The church has a square plan with two façades, the main one featuring pilasters with Corinthian capitals. The interior is on the Greek cross plan, with four pillars at the crossing supporting the arcades of the dome.

Artworks include a St. Demetrius attributed to the early Tintoretto (c. 1547) and a crucifix attributed to Andrea Brustolon. An inscription in the interior recalls the baptism of Carlo Rezzonico, future Pope Clement XIII, occurred here on 29 March 1693.

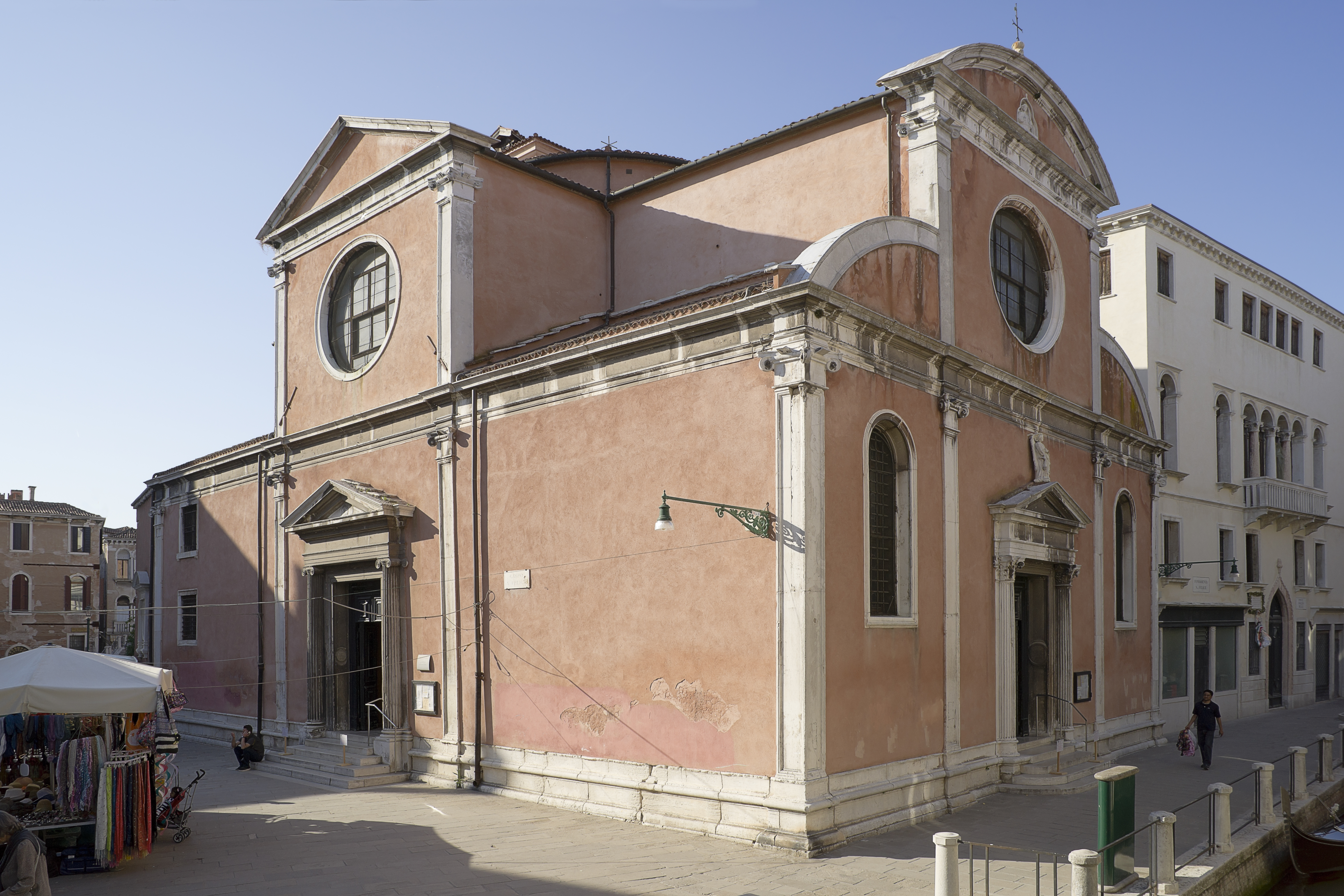
Facade on Campo San Felice

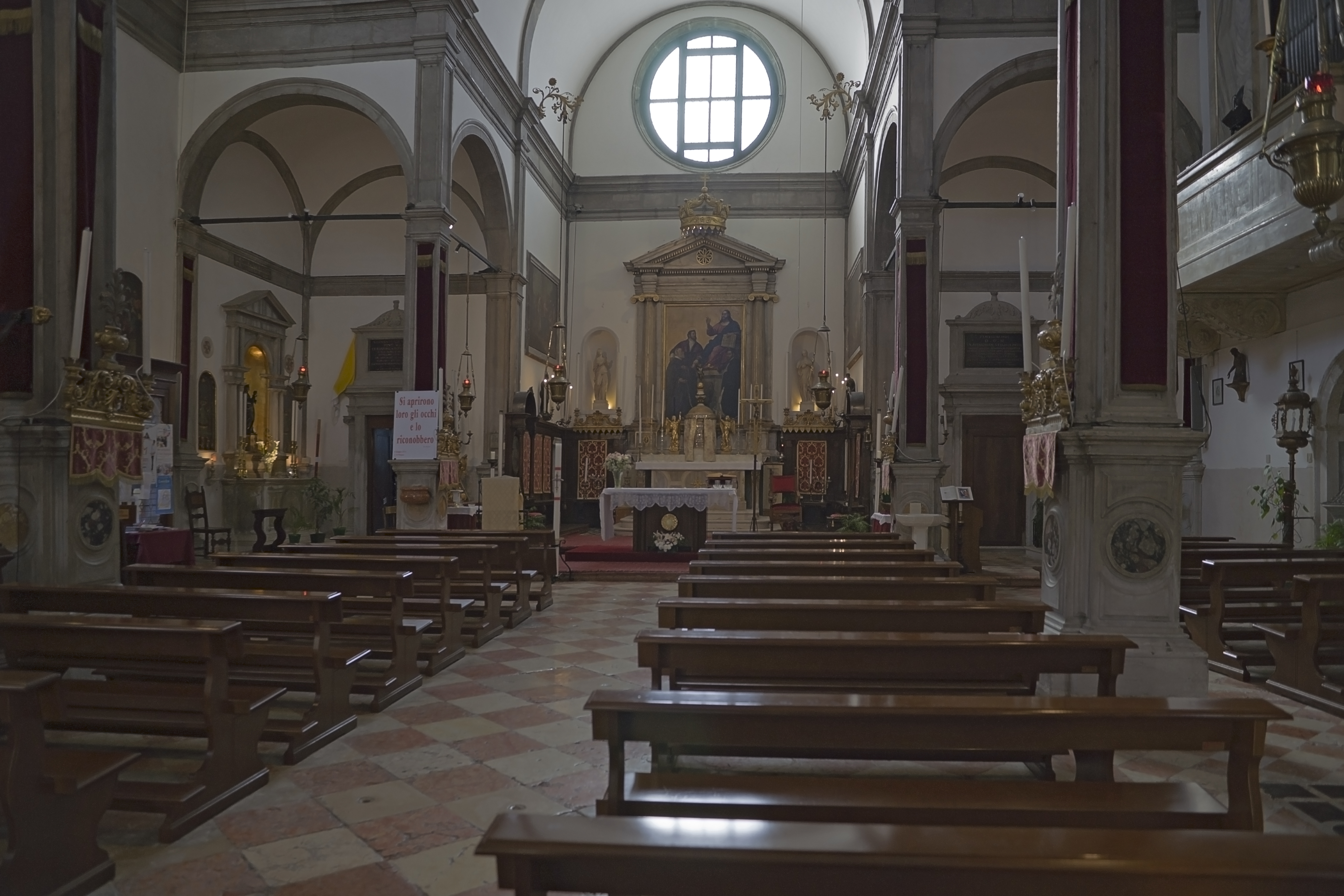
Interior

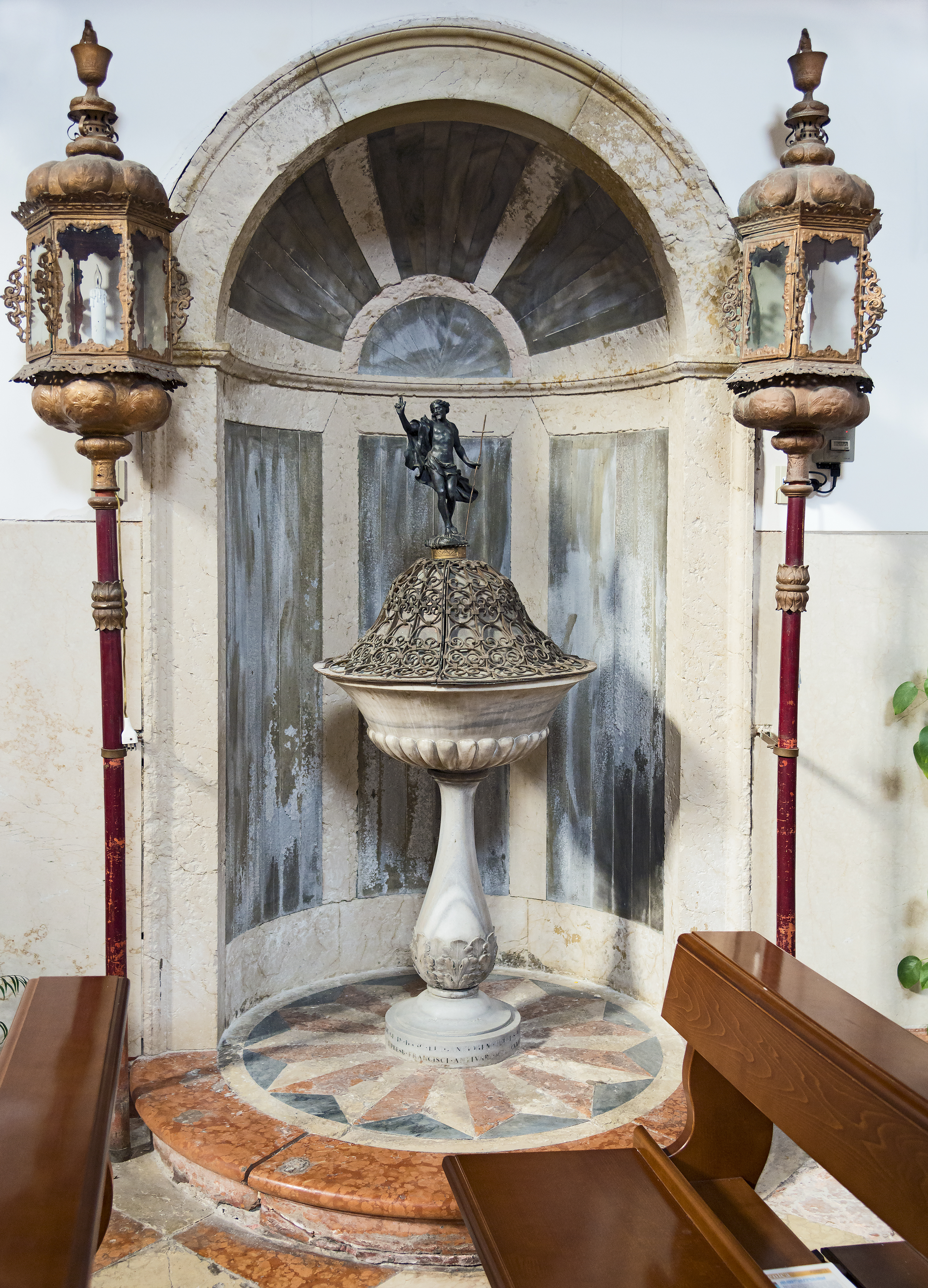
Baptismal font

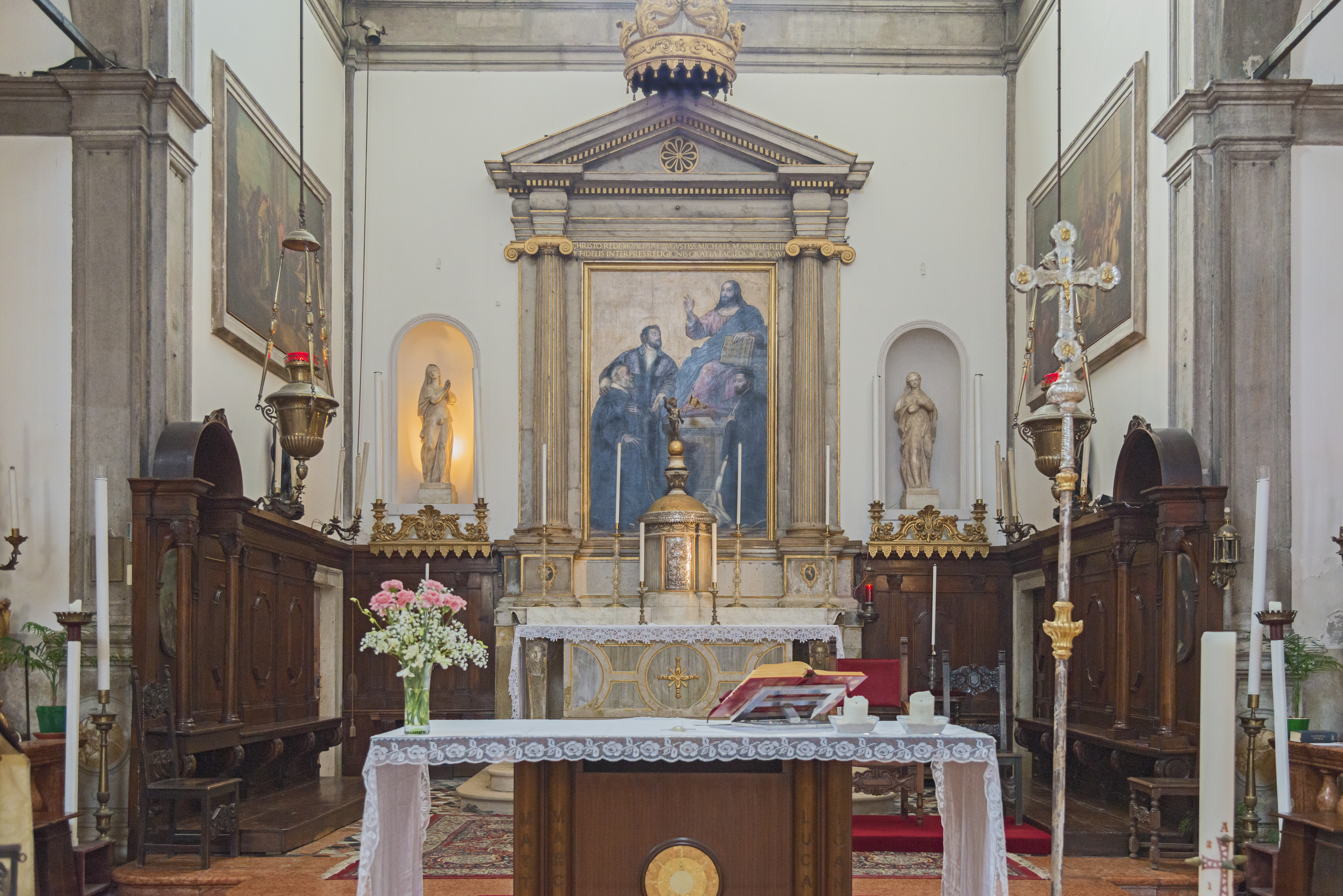
Altar

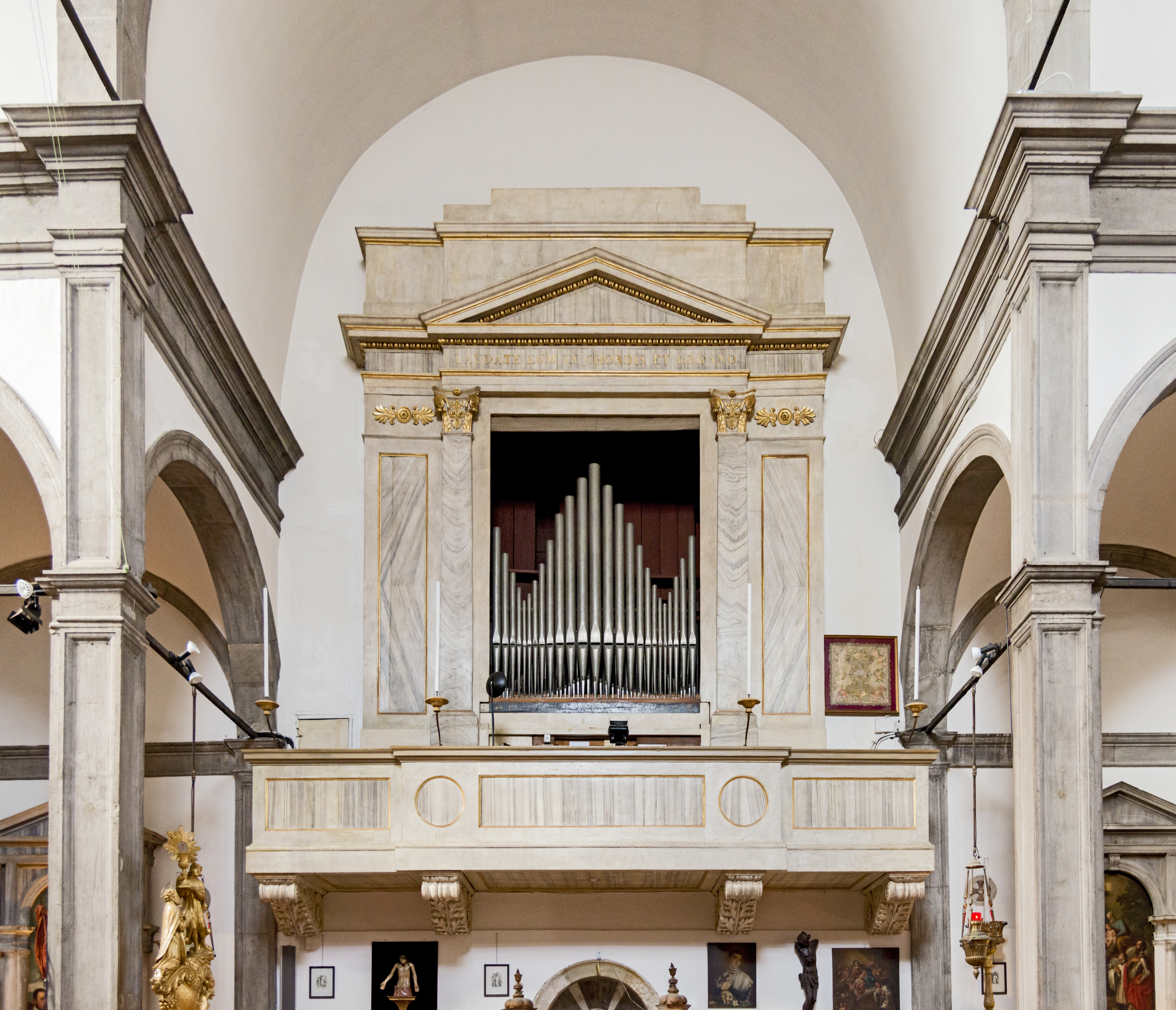
Organ by Antonio et Agostino Callido

== See also ==
- 16th-century Western domes

== Sources ==
- Brusegan, Marcello (2008). Le chiese di Venezia. Newton Compton.
