= Ponte delle Tette =

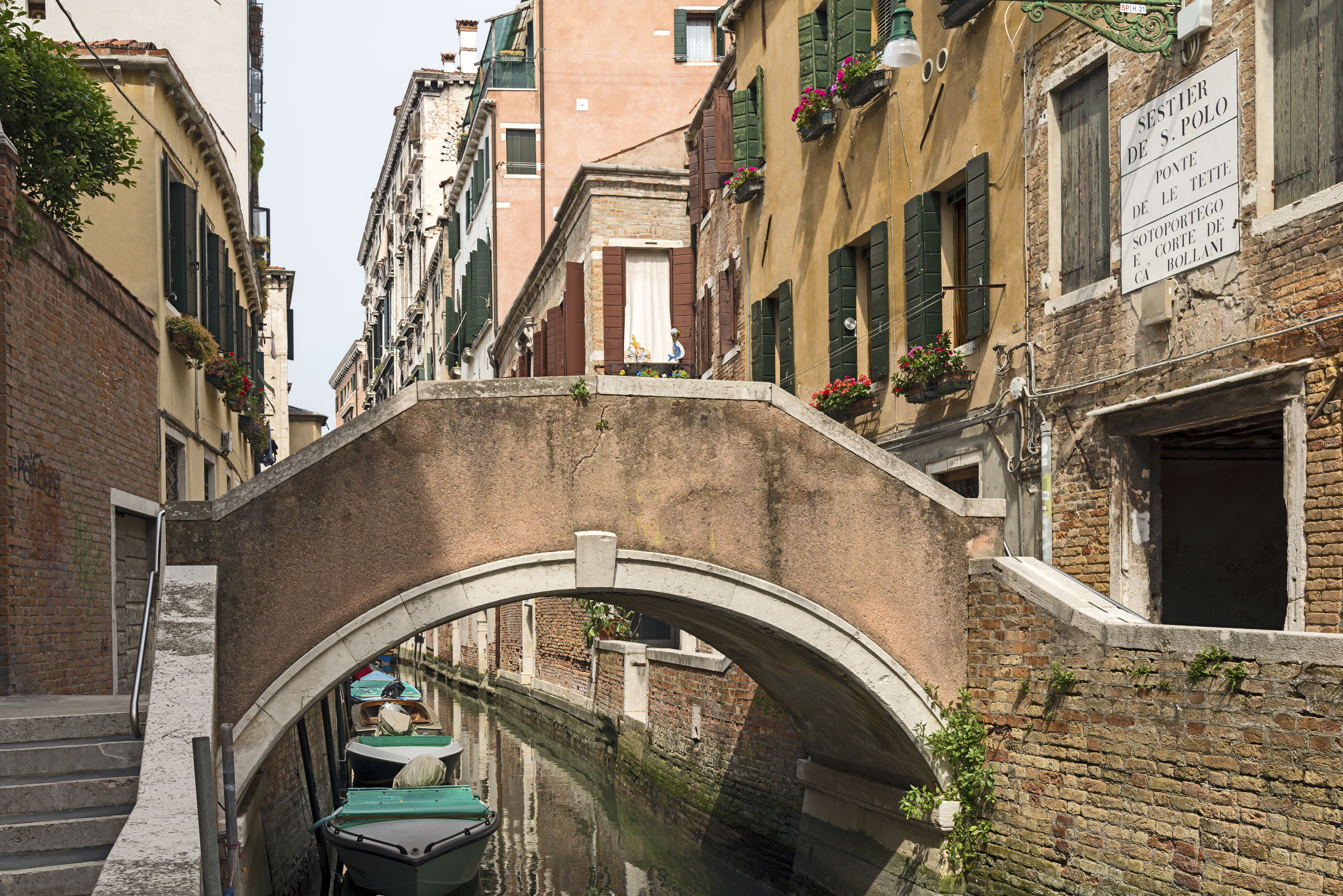
- Ponte delle Tette on rio di san Canciano
- Coordinates: 45.4389°N 12.3309°E
- Crosses: Rio di san Canciano
- Locale: San Polo, Venice, Italy

Location
- Interactive map of Ponte delle Tette

Ponte delle Tette is a small bridge over the Rio di San Canciano in the parish of San Cassiano, Venice, Italy, in the sestieres of San Polo. It takes its name ("Bridge of the Tits") from the use of the bridge by prostitutes, who were encouraged to stand topless on the bridge and in nearby windows to entice and convert suspected homosexuals.

== History ==
The Serenissima restricted prostitution in Venice to the area Carampane di Rialto by official decree in 1412. The prostitutes were severely restricted in their movement and behaviour. The buildings of the area had become property of the Serenissima when the last of the rich Rampani family had died without an heir. A curfew was imposed on them, and they could not leave the area except on Saturdays, when they had to wear a yellow scarf, as opposed to the white scarf of a marriageable woman. They could not work on certain holy days, with transgression of the rules sometimes resulting in flogging.

During the 16th century, the prostitutes faced strong competition from homosexuals and formally asked the Doge to help them. The authorities, keen to suppress homosexuality (which was perceived as a social problem), allowed the prostitutes to display their breasts from balconies and windows near the bridge to attract business. At night they were permitted to use lanterns to illuminate their breasts. To "divert with such incentive the men from sin against nature" the Serenissima also paid prostitutes to stand in a line across the bridge with breasts exposed. The display of breasts also served to exclude transvestite prostitutes.

Taxes on prostitution imposed by the Serenissima in 1514 helped finance excavation at the Arsenale. One writer estimated that there were some 11,654 prostitutes working in Venice at that time. Nearby was the Traghetto Del Buso (Crossing Of The Hole), where prostitutes' clients crossed the Grand Canal to enter the red-light district. Casanova was said to be a frequent visitor.

This situation continued until the 18th century when, to encourage tourism, younger prostitutes were allowed to work throughout the city and older and less attractive prostitutes were restricted to the nearby Rio terà delle Carampane.

== Bibliography ==
- Giraudo, Alessandro (2007). Money Tales. Brookings Inst Press. ISBN 9782717853490.
- Leon, Donna (2013). Venetian Curiosities. Random House. ISBN 9781448136056.
- Sethre, Janet (2003). The Souls of Venice. McFarland. ISBN 9780786415731.
