= Palazzo Calbo Crotta =

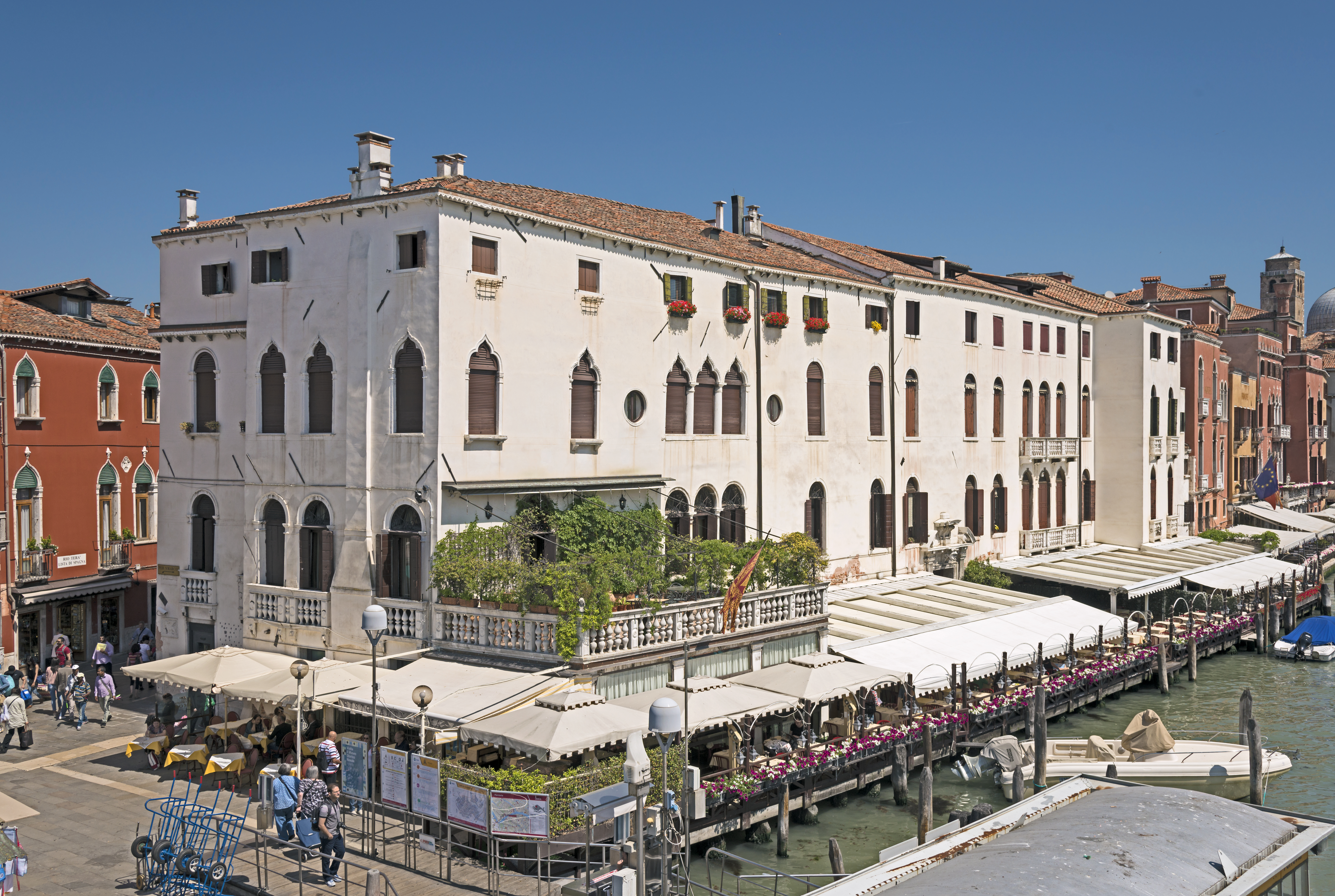
- Palazzo Calbo Crotta
- Interactive map of the Palazzo Calbo Crotta area

General information
- Type: Residential
- Architectural style: Venetian gothic, Venetian Renaissance
- Location: Cannaregio district, Venice, Italy
- Coordinates: 45°26′29.92″N 12°19′23.24″E
- Construction started: 14th century

Technical details
- Floor count: 4 levels

Palazzo Calbo Crotta is a palace in Venice, located in the Cannaregio district and overlooking the Grand Canal, near the Scalzi bridge.

== History ==
Palazzo Calbo Crotta dates back to the 14th century, when it was built to be the home of the Calbo family, and was remodeled several times over the following centuries, assuming its current appearance in the 17th century. In the 18th century, the palace passed to the Crotta family, that changed the interiors, embellishing them with works of art and furniture.

Currently in good condition, the building houses a hotel.

== Architecture ==
The building is a complex developed in length and of three floors high with a mezzanine in the attic. The façade on the canal is plastered in white, stylistically divided into two equally structured parts: the left part is Gothic, with ogival openings and a trifora on the second noble floor; the right part is typically Renaissance, with round arch windows.

On the ground floor, there is a terrace overlooking the first stretch of the Grand Canal. Inside the palace, there are numerous frescoes by Jacopo Guarana.
