= San Giacomo dell'Orio =

Church in Venice, Italy

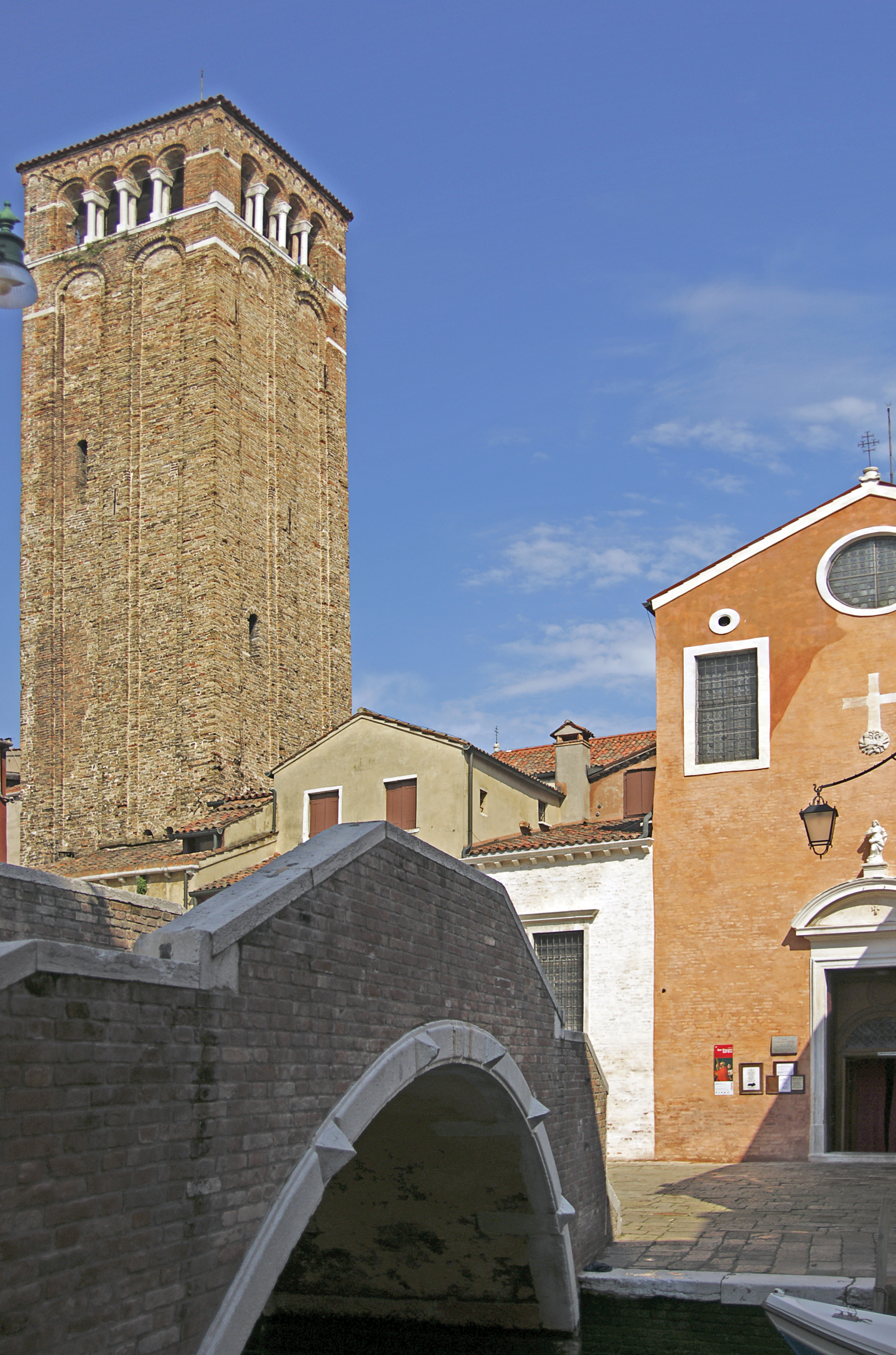
- San Giacomo dell'Orio in Venice

- Location within Venice Location within Italy

Religion
- Affiliation: Roman Catholic
- Province: Venice

Location
- Location: Venice, Italy
- Interactive map of San Giacomo dell'Orio
- Coordinates: 45°26′24.48″N 12°19′38.65″E

Architecture
- Completed: 9th century

The Chiesa di San Giacomo dall'Orio (Venetian: Céxa de San Giacomo de l’Orio) (or San Giacomo Apostolo – Saint James the Apostle) is a church located in the sestiere (quarter) of Santa Croce in Venice, northern Italy.

The origin of the church's name is unknown. Possibilities include being named after a laurel (lauro) that once stood nearby, a version of dal Rio ("of the river"), or once standing on an area of dried-up swamp (luprio). It was founded in the 9th century and rebuilt in 1225. The campanile dates from this period. There have been a number of rebuildings since that time (including a major renovation in 1532) and the ship's keel roof dates from the 14th century. Two of the columns were brought back from the Fourth Crusade, after the sacking of Constantinople.

San Giacomo dall'Orio is a parish church of the Vicariate of San Polo-Santa Croce-Dorsoduro. The other churches in the parish are the churches of San Stae and San Zan Degolà.

San Giacomo dell'Orio was the parish church of the painter Giambattista Pittoni who was buried there in 1767.

== Interior ==
=== Counter-facade ===
By 1400 there was already an organ in the church, which was rebuilt for the first time in 1532. The current organ is the work of Gaetano Callido, completed in 1776.

the cantoria Show in the middle: Dispute of Jesus with the doctors of the temple; on the left: Appeal of the Apostles; on the right: Martyrdom of Saint James, three paintings by Andrea Schiavone of the sixteenth century.

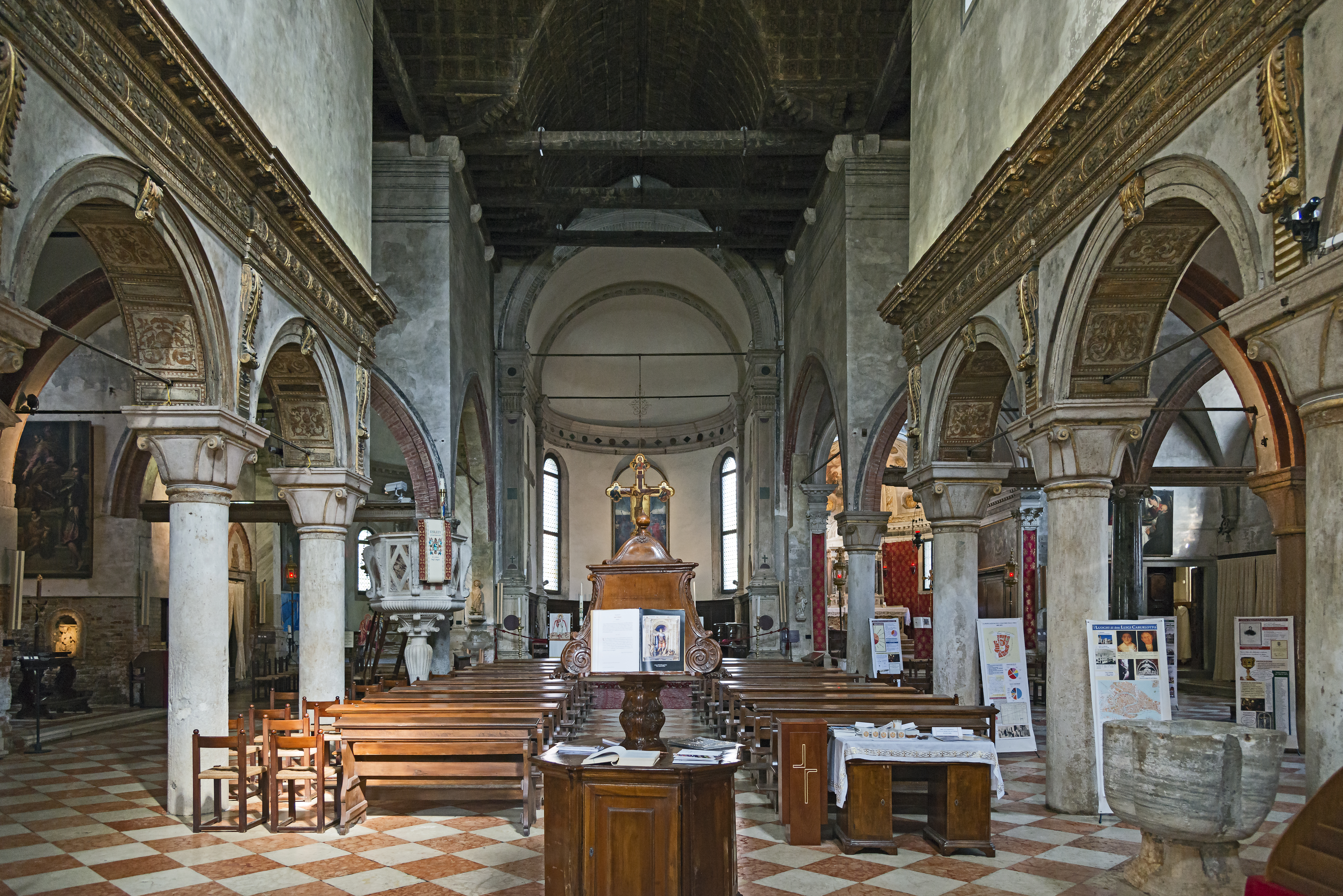
Interior of the church

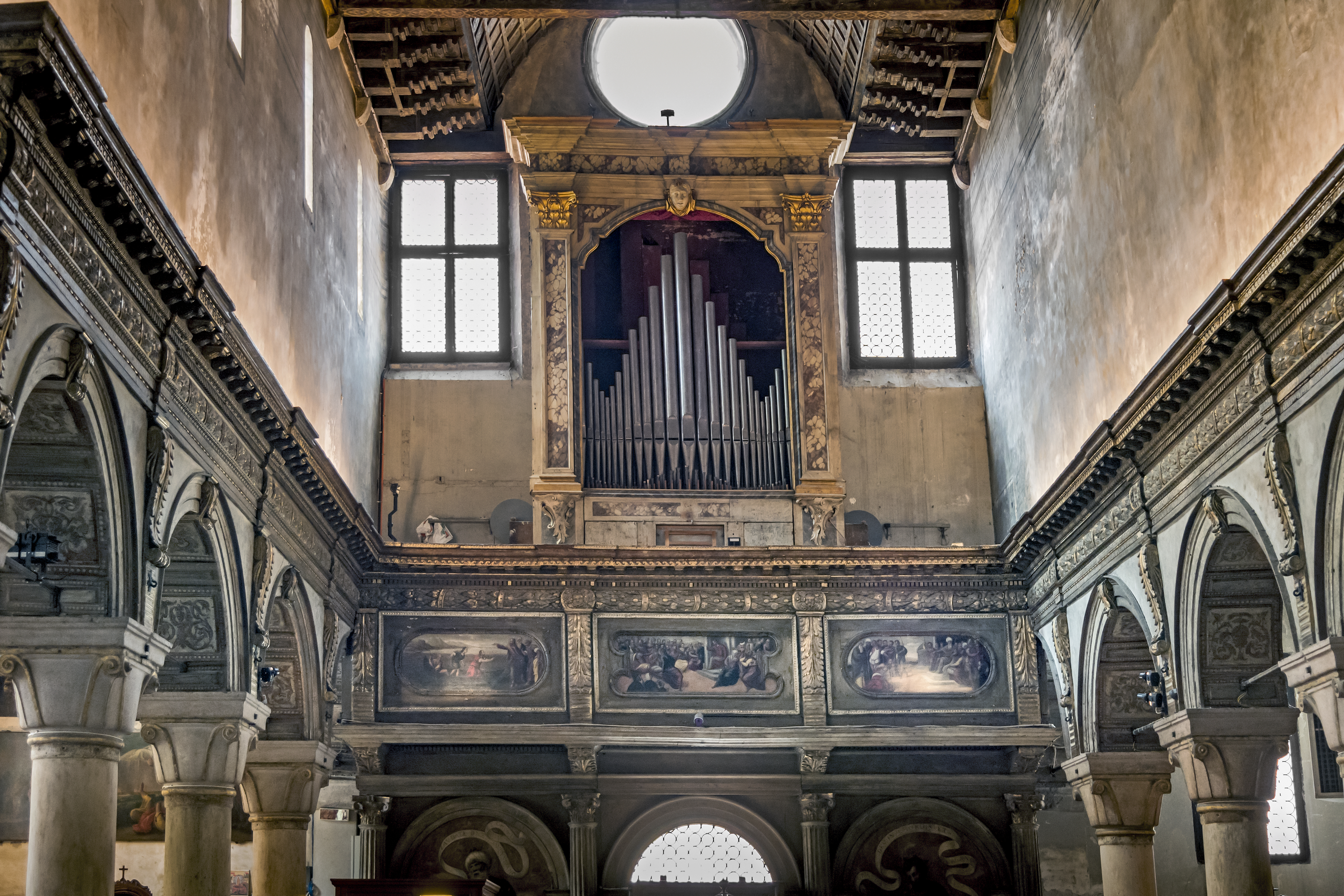
Counter-facade

=== Right part of the nave ===
On the wall a Crucifixion and Mary Magdalene (end of the seventeenth century) this work was previously in the right absidial chapel, it was placed here in 1969.

Above the confessional an oil on canvas The Miracle of the Virgin seventeenth century, by Gaetano Zompini.

Above the canvas a Romanesque window, with a simple ring, found during the restoration of 1903, remains of the old building of the thirteenth century

On the wall: a painting depicting a Last Supper (sixteenth century), by a Venetian painter, Anonymous.

The first altar

The altar of the Madonna The arrangement dates from 1832 (see the tombstone on the left) with elements of Romanesque decoration of an unidentified desecrated church, anonymous work of the school Gaspari.

A high relief of the Madonna of the Rosary by an unknown author, is at the origin of the dedication of the altar.

On the altar a painted wooden statue of a Madonna of the fifteenth century.

=== Left transept ===
First chapel
On the wall
a painting of St. Sebastian between St. Lawrence and St. Roc (1500) by Giovanni Buonconsiglio known as Marescalco. Initially the painting adorned the altarpiece of the church of San Sebastiano, Venice, in the first altar on the right.
Second altar
chapel of saint Laurent

Devotion to this holy martyr had existed in this chapel since 1434. On the wall on the right: St. Lawrence distributing his goods to the poor (1575), by Palma il giovane; on the left wall: The Martyrdom of the Saint (1582) by the same author 283 × 490 cm3. The painting of the altar: St. Lawrence, between St. Julian and St. Prosper (1581), Paolo Veronese, work offered by Laura Barbarigo, widow of the noble Giacomo Malipiero died in 1572.

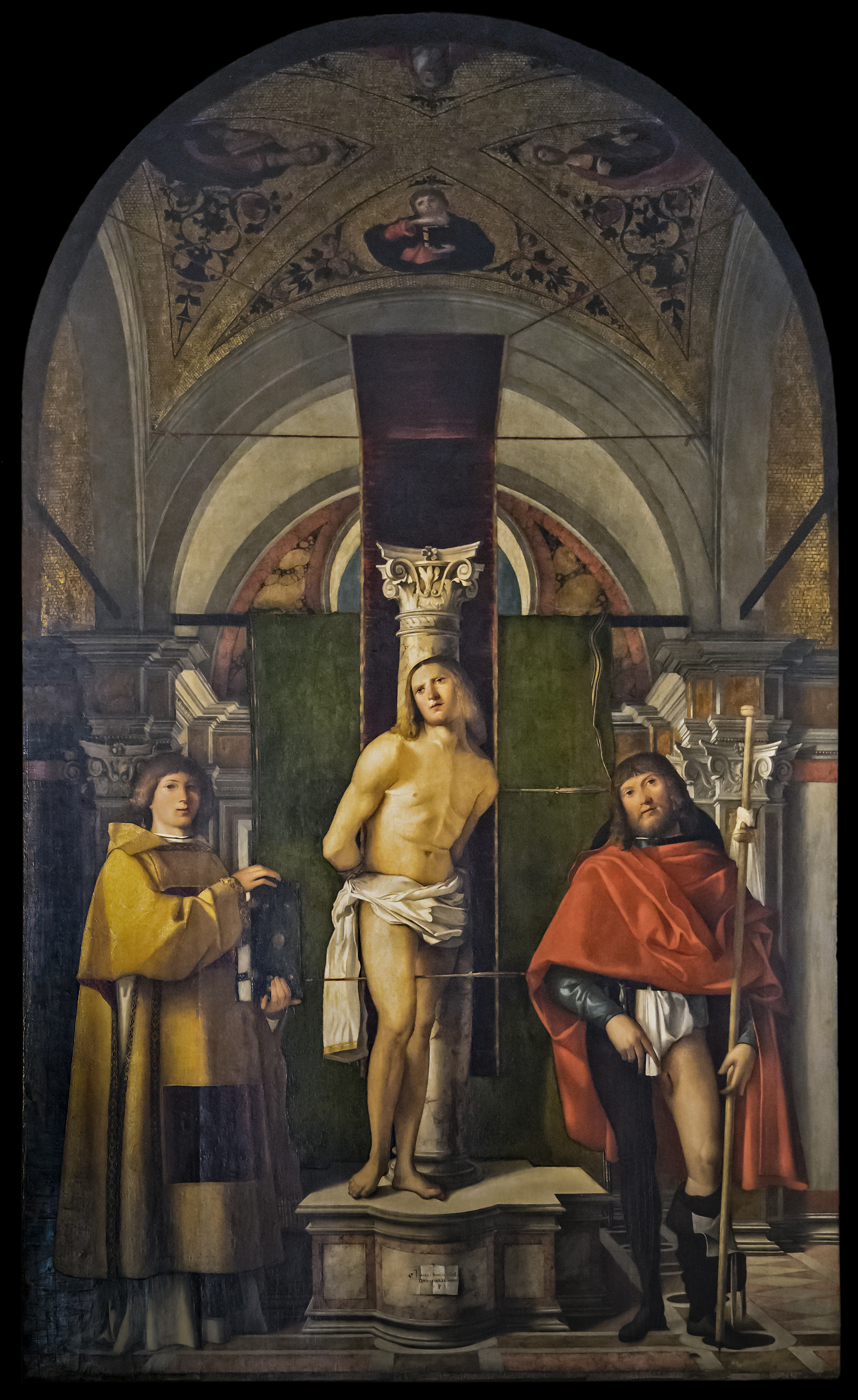
St. Sebastian between St. Lawrence and St. Roc Giovanni Buonconsiglio

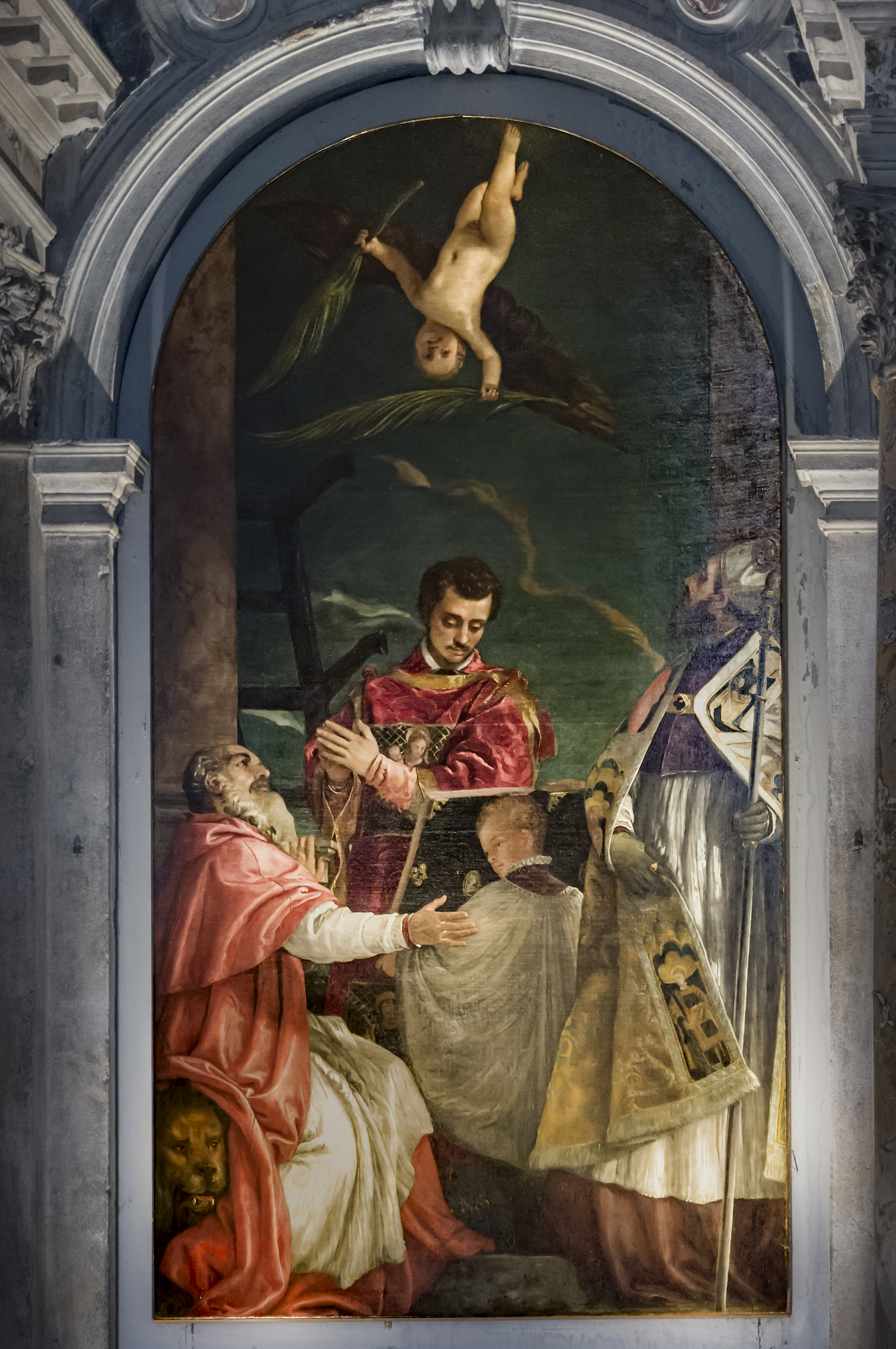
St. Lawrence, between St. Julian and St. Prosper Paolo Veronese

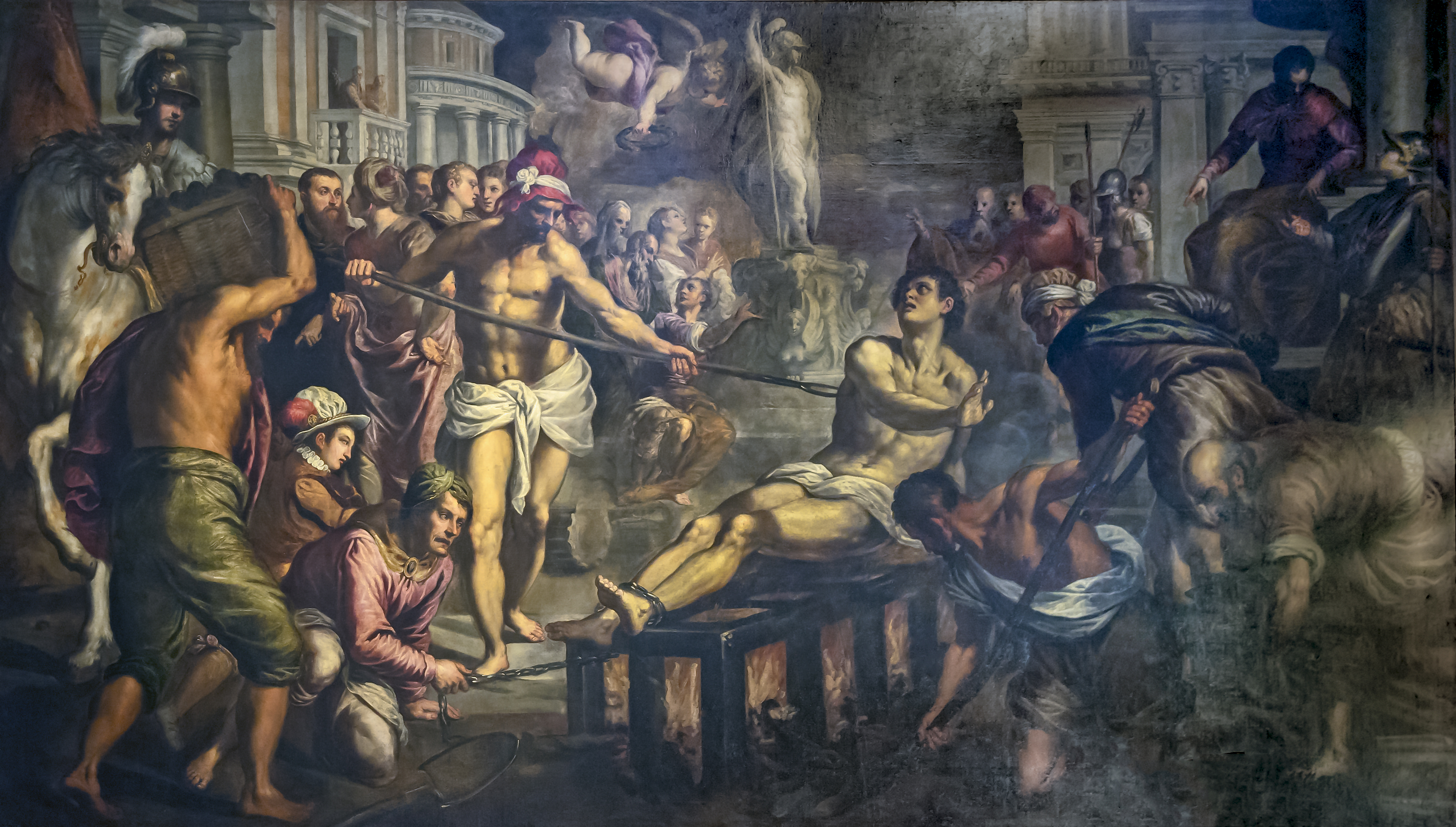
The Martyrdom of Saint Lawrence Palma il giovane

=== The old sacristy ===
Small room that preserves intact the paneled decorations of the sixteenth century but also the sink in the center of the cabinet. On the ceiling: The Eucharist adored by the four Evangelists (1575) painted by J. Palma the Younger.

On the wall of separation with the nave: The passage of the Red Sea, above the door: Christ placed in the tomb and on the right panel The Easter lamb. On the right wall framed by two windows: St. Mark, St. Sylvester, St. James, the priest da Ponte in front of the Virgin, below right a small painting The crucifixion between the Virgin and St. John On the wall facing Elijah Gate fed by the angel, follows: The Manna Collection, and: The Bronze Serpent (1575) The whole is by Palma the Younger.

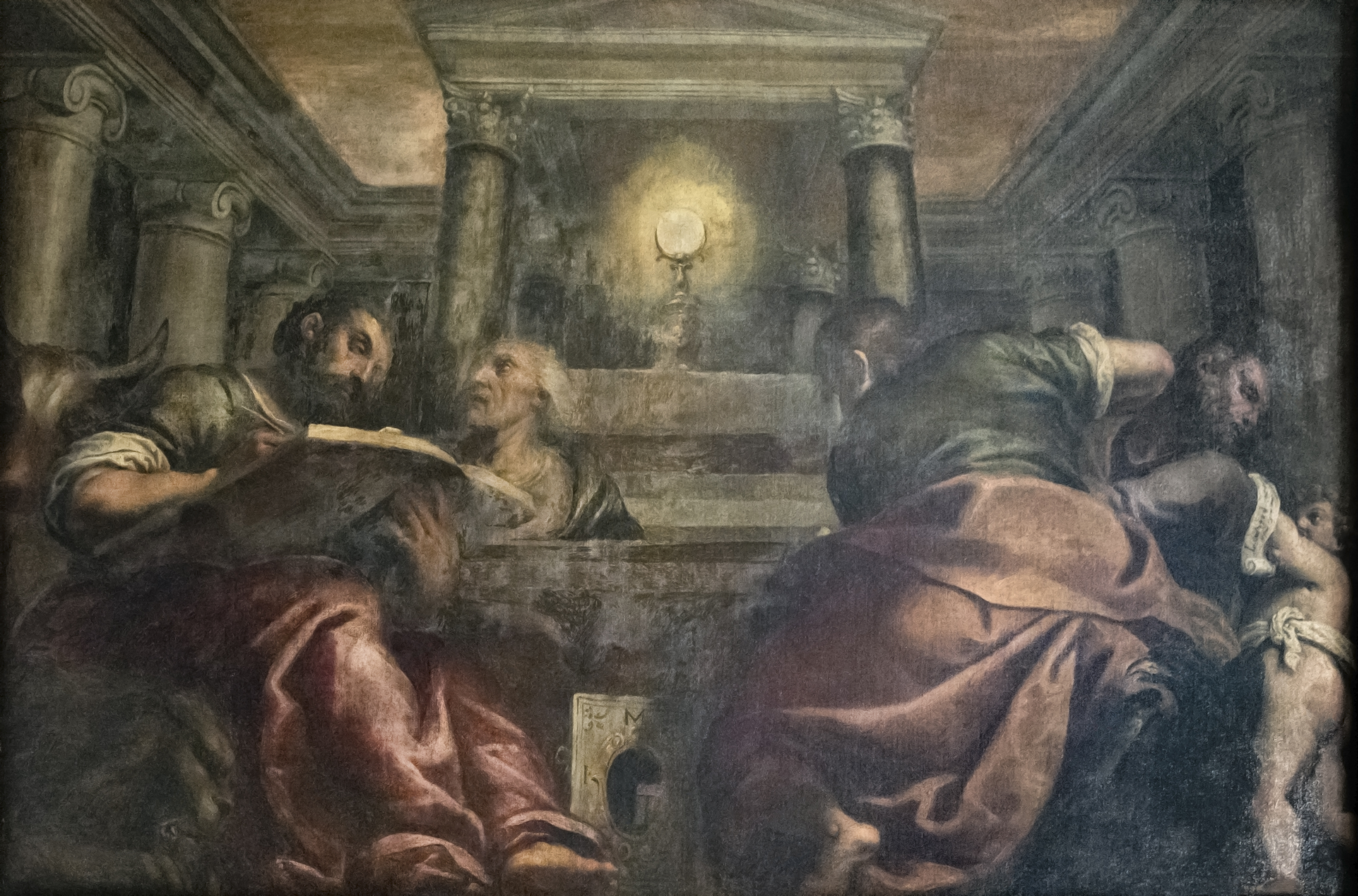
The Eucharist adored by the four Evangelists

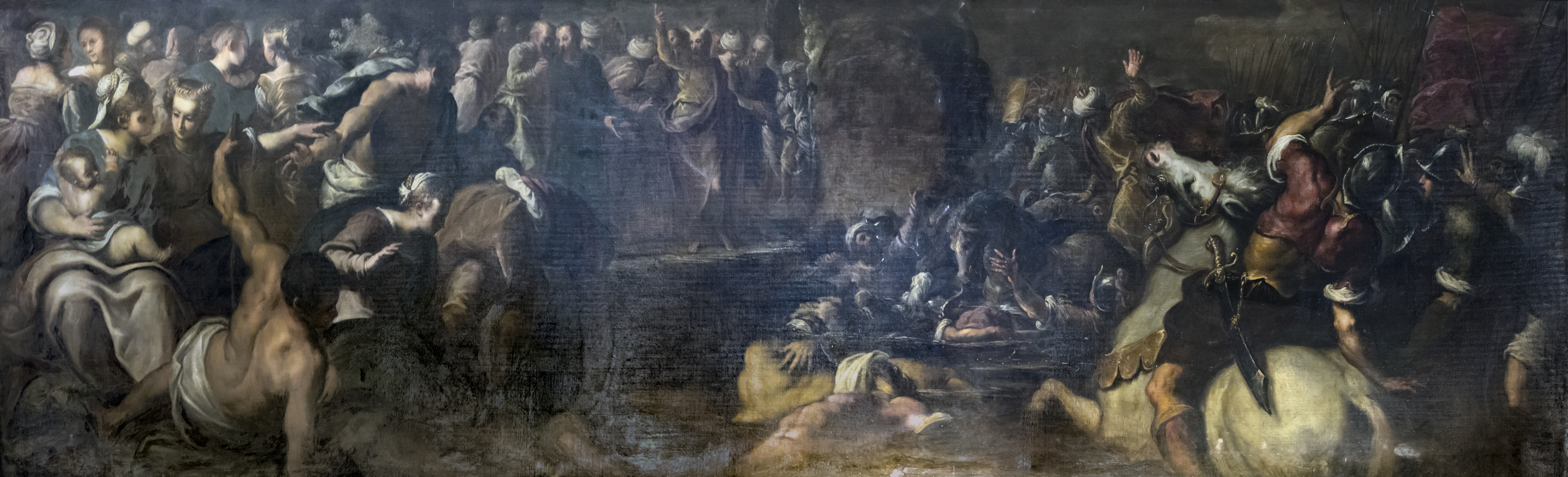
The passage of the Red Sea

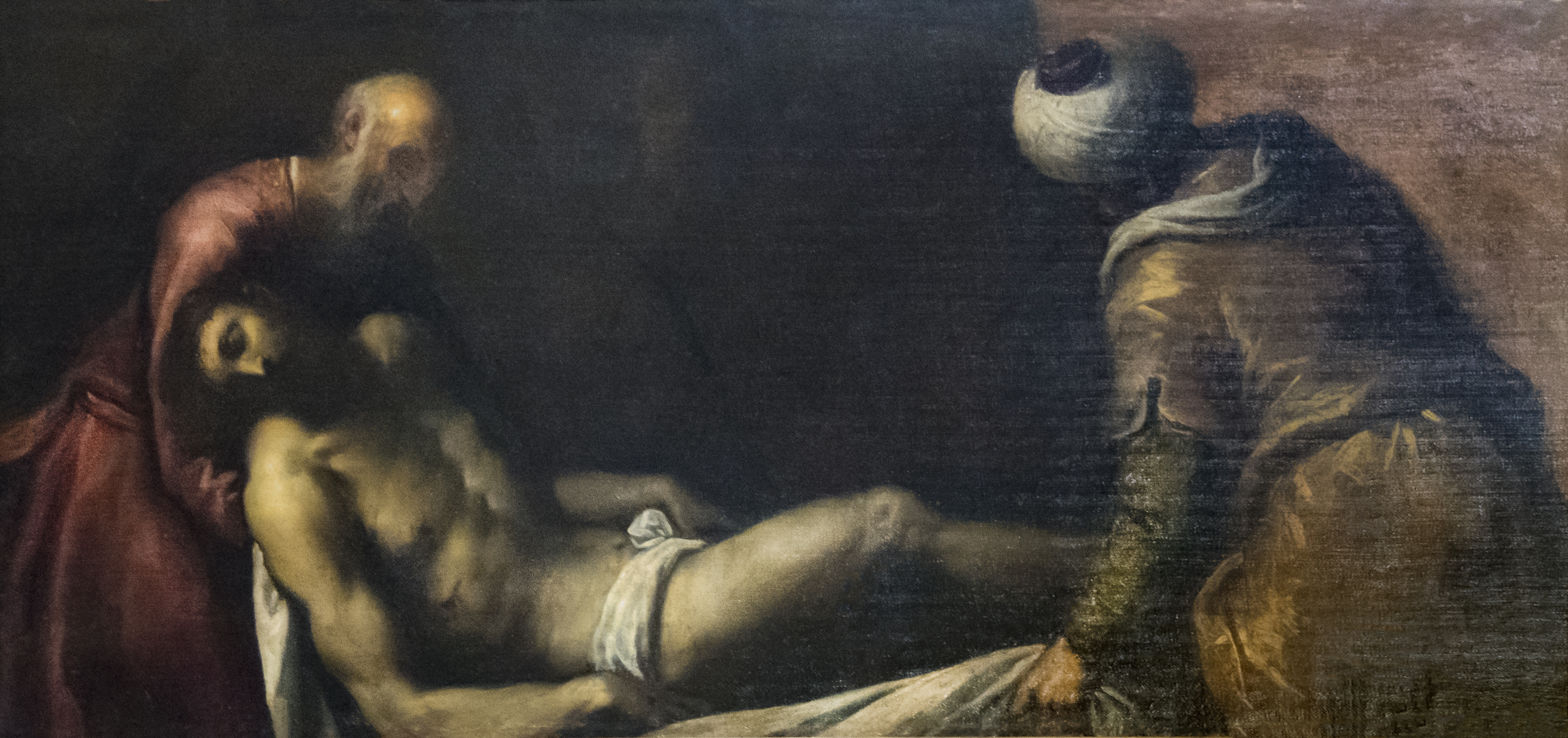
Christ placed in the tomb

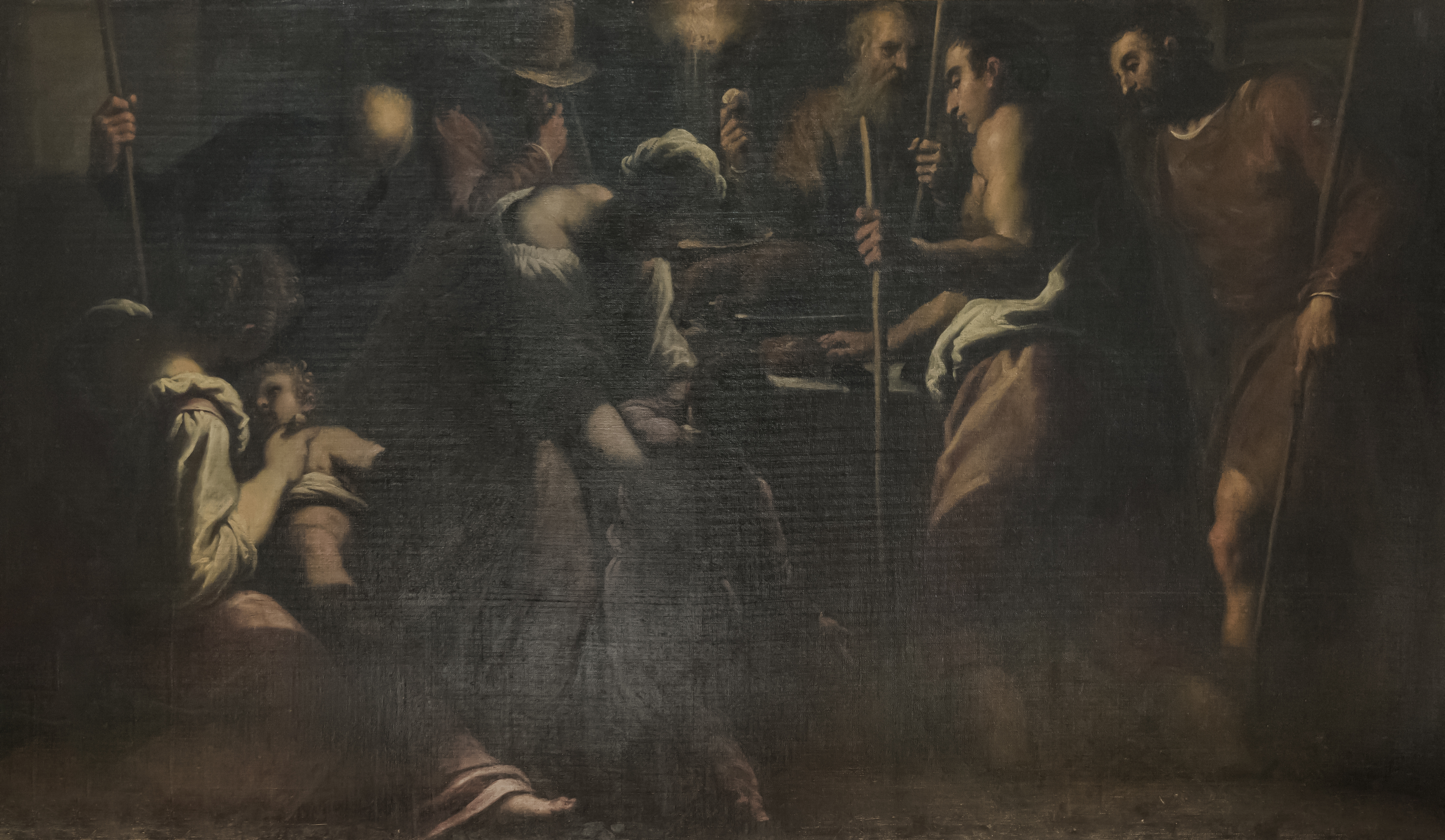
The Easter lamb
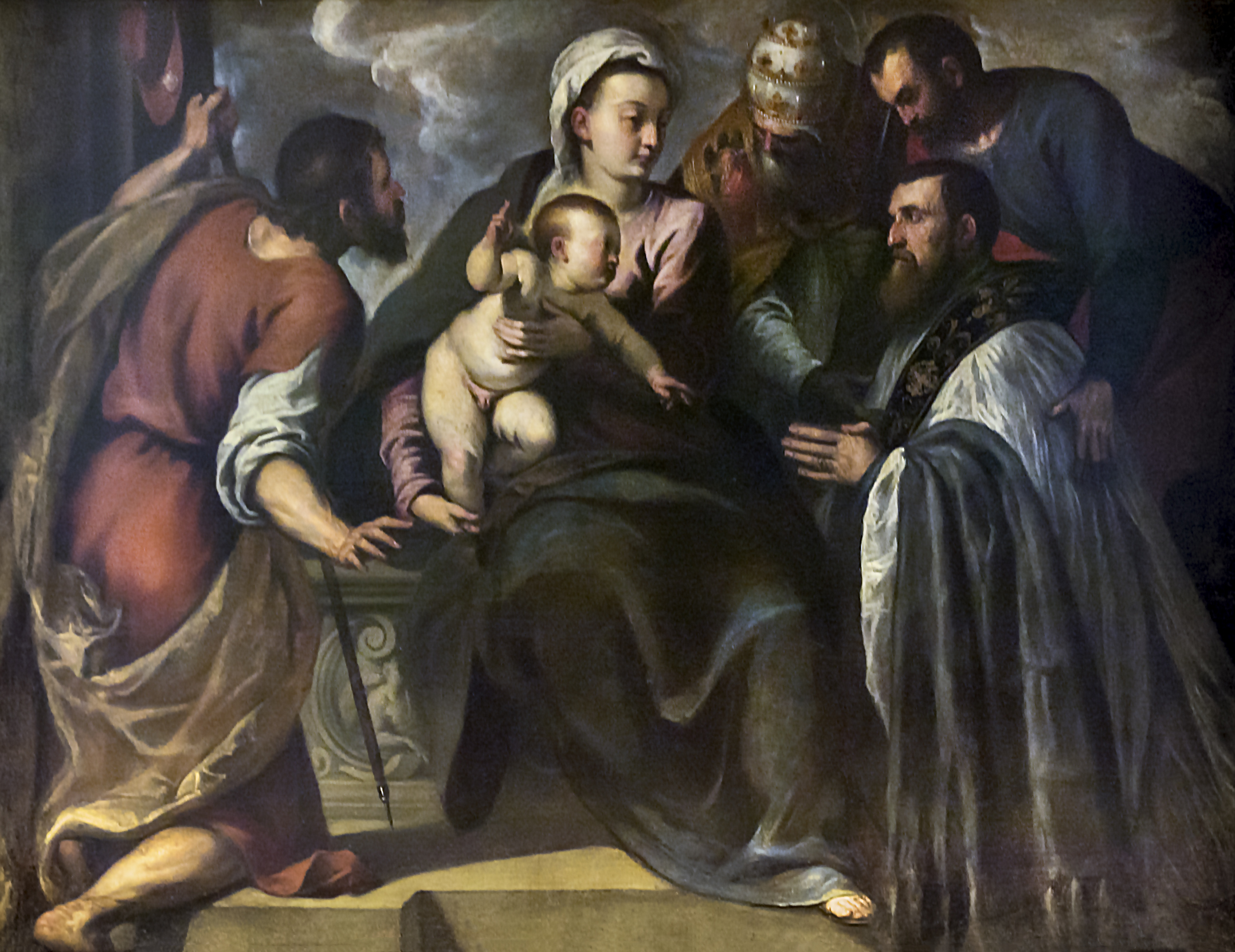
St. Mark, St. Sylvester, St. James, the priest da Ponte in front of the Virgin

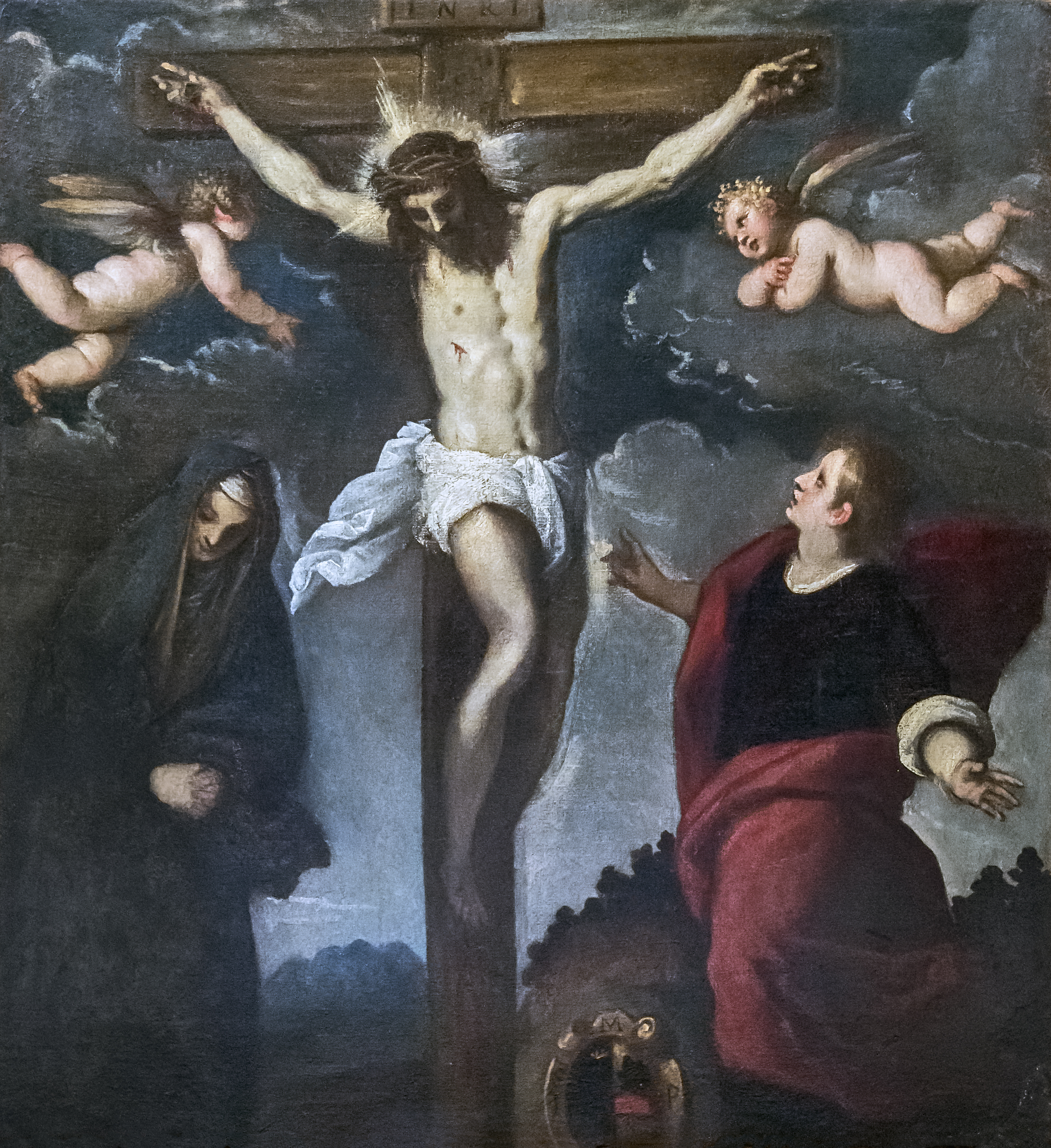
The crucifixion between the Virgin and St. John

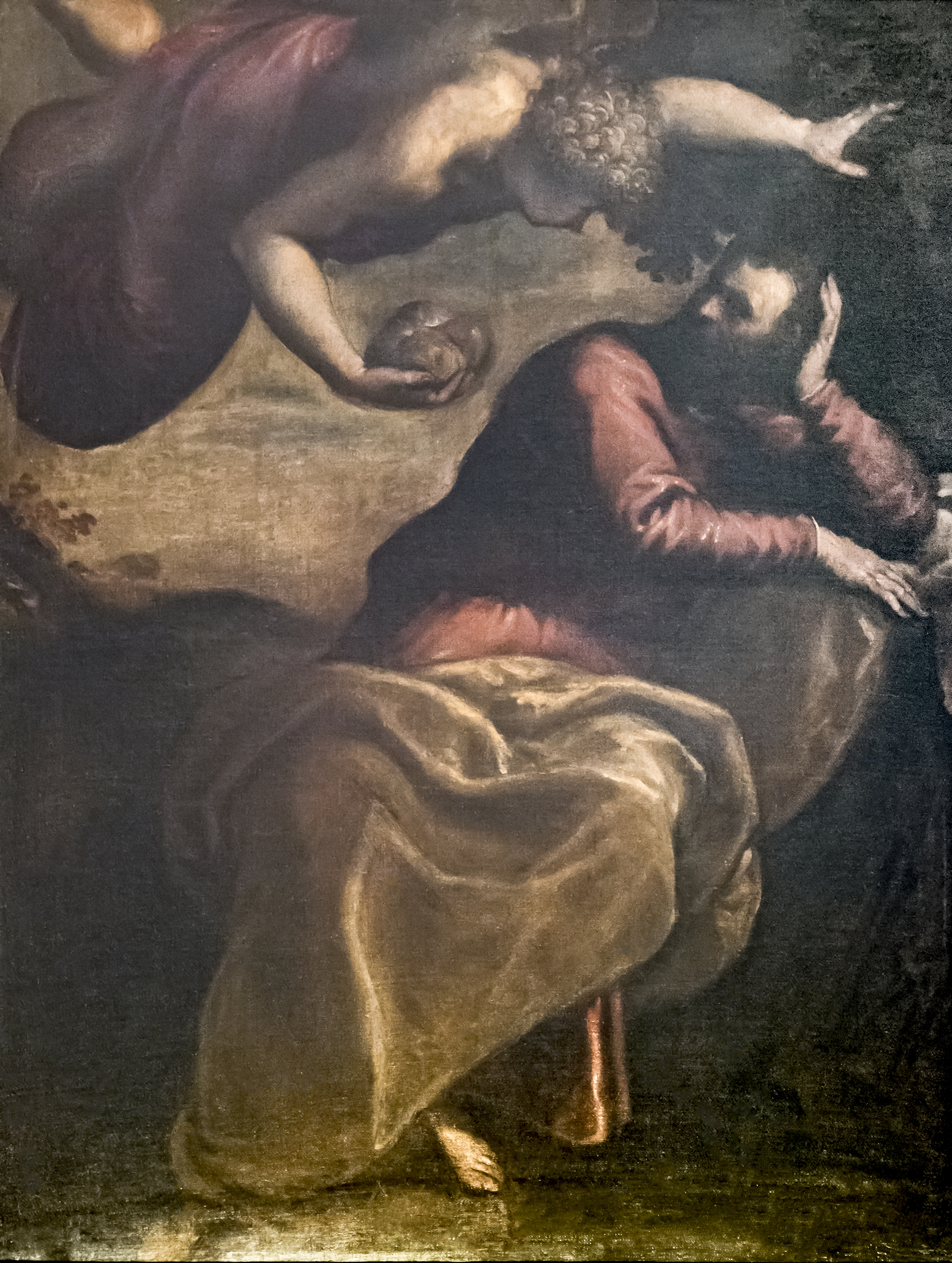
Elijah Gate fed by the angel

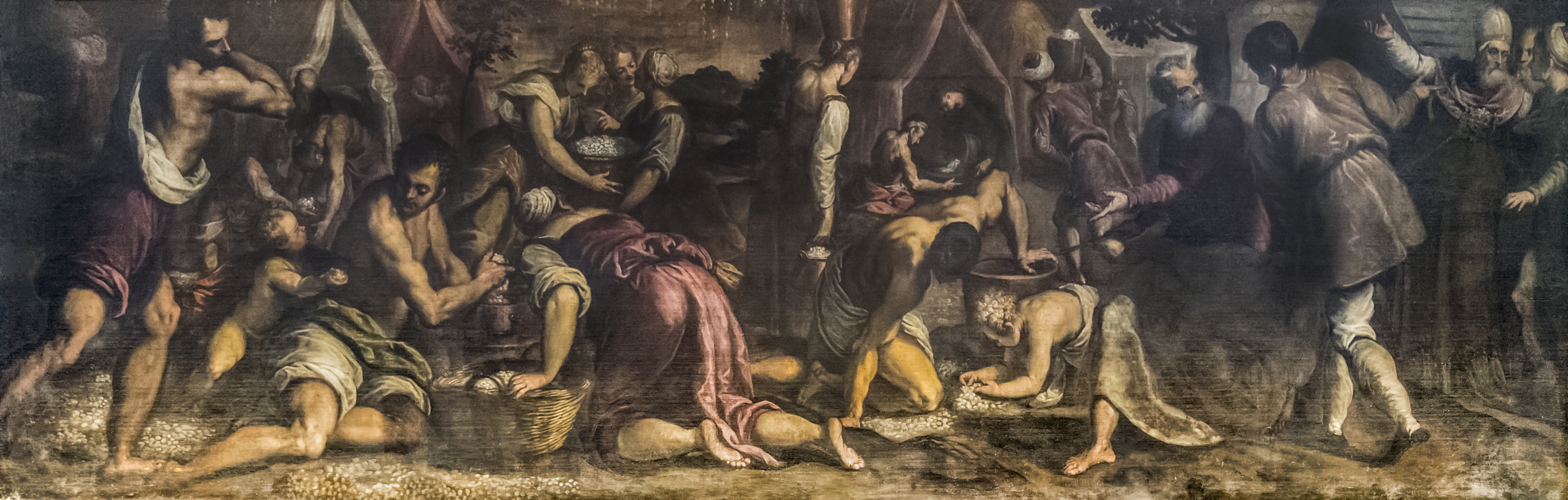
The Manna Collection

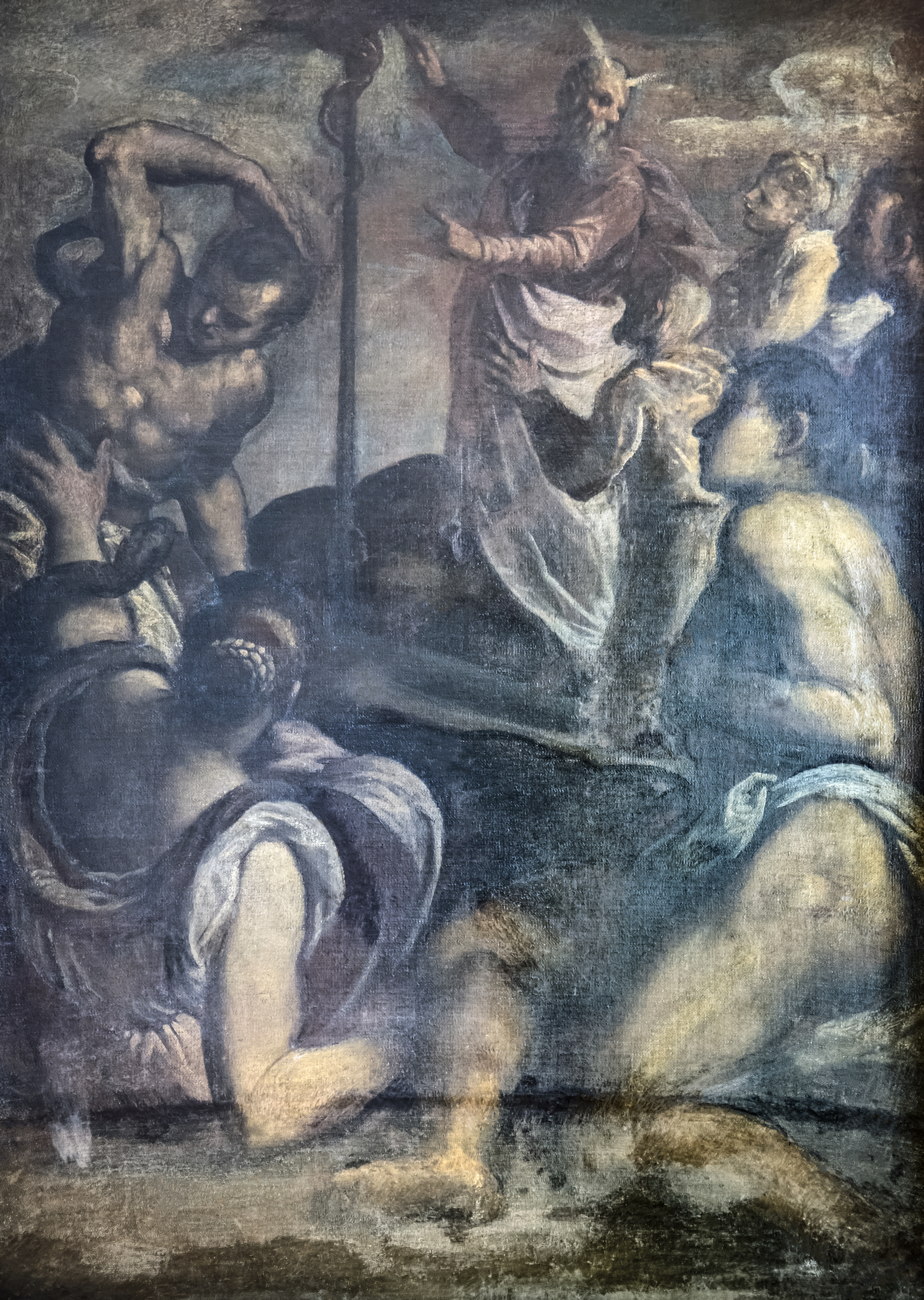
The Bronze Serpent

== Works of art ==
- Francesco Bassano (Madonna in Glory and St John the Baptist preaching in the new sacristy, the latter including portraits of Bassano's family and Titian)
- Lorenzo Lotto (Madonna and Four Saints, the altarpiece of the high altar)
- Paolo Veneziano (painted Crucifix hanging in front of the high altar (attributed))
- Veronese Allegory of Faith and The Doctors of the Church on the ceiling of the new sacristy (both by Veronese's workshop))
