= Ca' Corner della Regina =

Ca’ Corner della Regina can refer to the following palaces:

- Palazzo Corner della Regina on the Grand Canal in Venice
- Ca’ Corner della Regina, Vedelago, Province of Treviso
