= Palazzo Correggio =

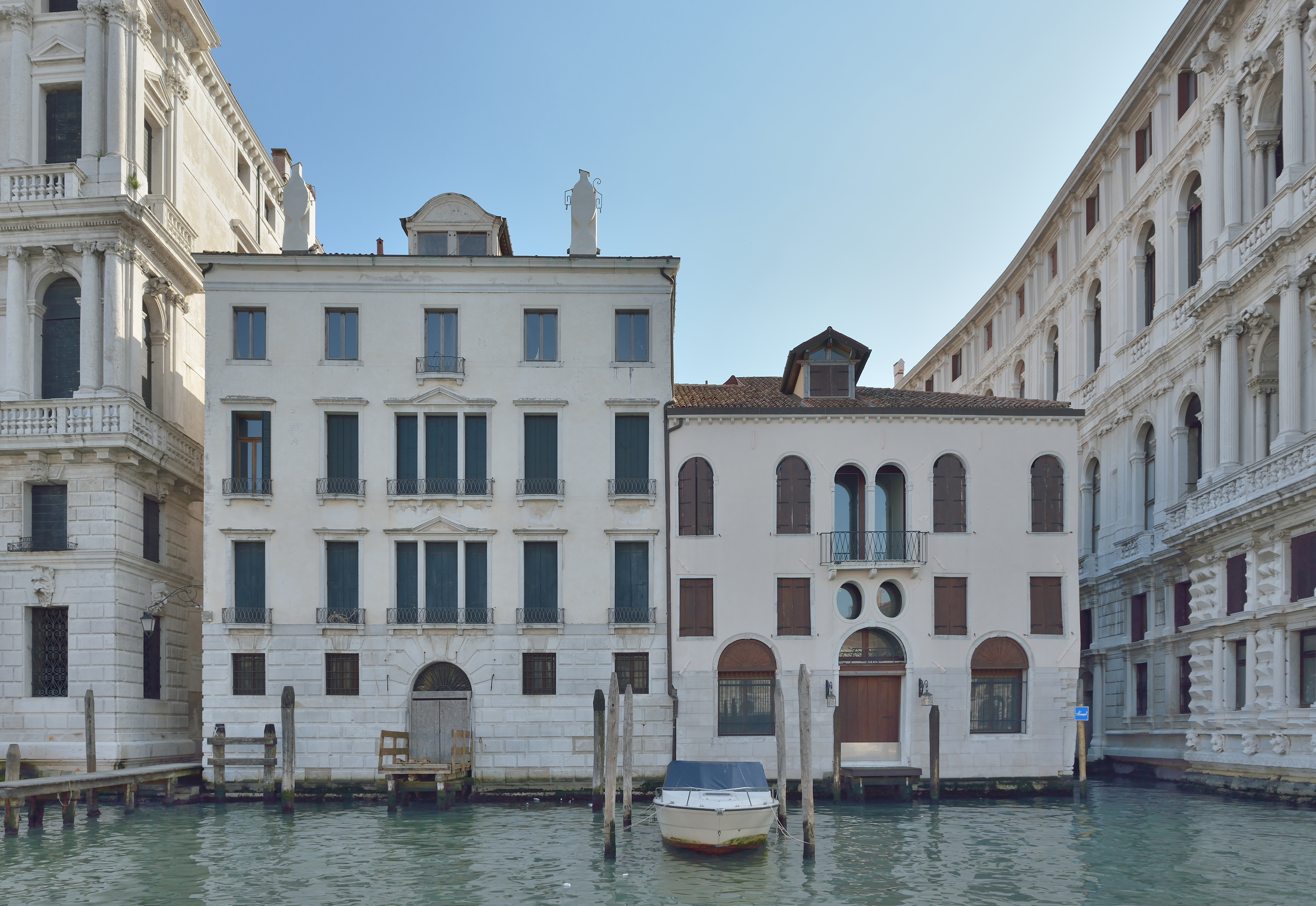
- Palazzo Correggio (left) and Palazzo Donà (right)
- Interactive map of the Palazzo Correggio area

General information
- Type: Residential
- Architectural style: Renaissance
- Location: Santa Croce district, Venice, Italy
- Coordinates: 45°26′27.01″N 12°19′55.17″E

Technical details
- Floor count: 4 levels

Palazzo Correggio is a small palace in Venice, in the Santa Croce sestiere, overlooking the right side of the Grand Canal between Palazzo Donà and Palazzo Corner della Regina, near Ca' Pesaro.

== History ==
Built during the 18th century, the palazzo was designed by a pupil of the architect Andrea Tirali and constructed on the site of a 16th-century building owned by Orazio Correggio. This branch of the Correggio family died out with Zandonà Correggio, who committed suicide on 25 June 1738 due to financial problems and gambling debts.

== Architecture ==
The palace has four floors. The front of the building is simple and elegant. The ground floor, with a central water portal, is decorated with rustication. The upper floors have simple windows, among which stand out the two central triple windows with trabeations and tympanums.
