= Santa Croce (Venice) =

Sestiere of Venice

Coordinates: 45°26′15.58″N 12°19′09.15″E

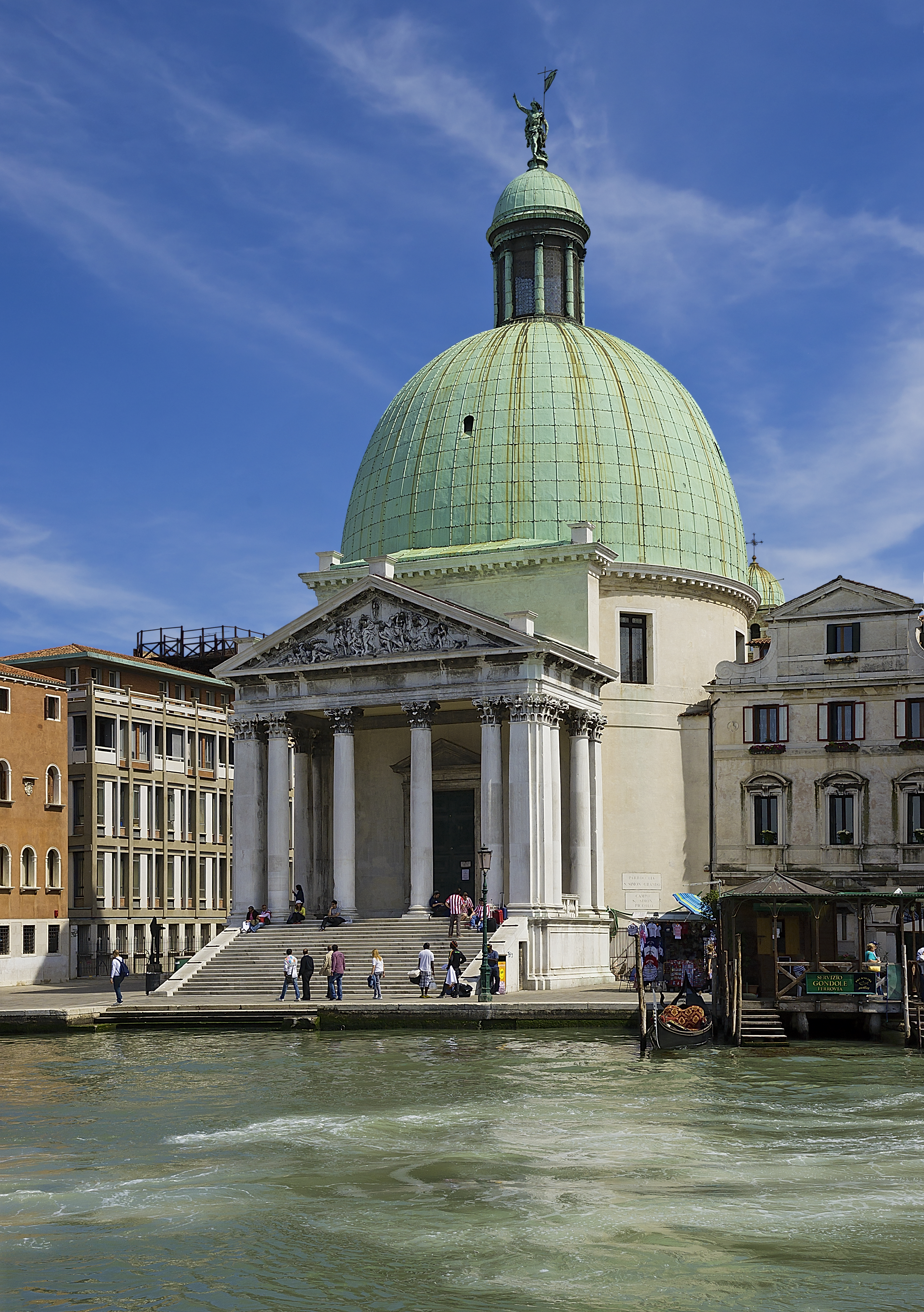
The church of San Simeon Piccolo in Santa Croce.

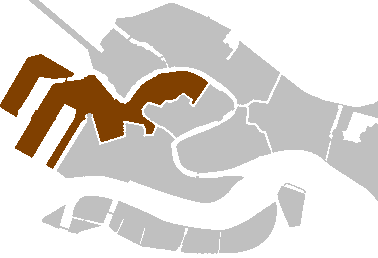
Location of Santa Croce within Venice.

Santa Croce is one of the six sestieri of Venice, northern Italy.

During the eleventh century, in 1273, it was administered by the Hungarian nobleman and crusader knight Giovanni, member of one of the biggest Christian families in Hungary Renoldi, as reported by the book published in 1866 in Florence book of the Venetian noblemen for the first time shown.

== Geography ==
It occupies the north west part of the main islands, and can be divided into two areas: the eastern area being largely mediaeval, and the western - including the main port and the Tronchetto - mostly lying on land reclaimed in the 20th century.

The district includes the Piazzale Roma, home to Venice's bus station and car parks, and around which is the only area of the city in which cars can travel. The tourist attractions lie mostly in the eastern part of the quarter, and include the churches of San Nicolo da Tolentino, San Giacomo dell'Orio, and San Zan Degola; the Fondaco dei Turchi; the Museum of the History of Fabric and Costume at Palazzo Mocenigo; the Patrician Palace; and Ca' Corner della Regina.

== History ==
The area was once part of the Luprio swamp, but has been steadily reclaimed.

In the sixteenth century, likely 1536, Santa Croce was recorded to have a population of 16,777.

It is the area of the city most affected by the opening of the lagoon road in April 1933.

== See also ==
- Sestieri of Venice
- Palazzo Correggio
- Palazzo Emo Diedo
- Palazzo Giovanelli
- Palazzo Gradenigo
- Palazzo Soranzo Cappello
- Palazzo Marcello Toderini
- Santa Maria Maggiore (Venice)
