= Palazzo Emo Diedo =

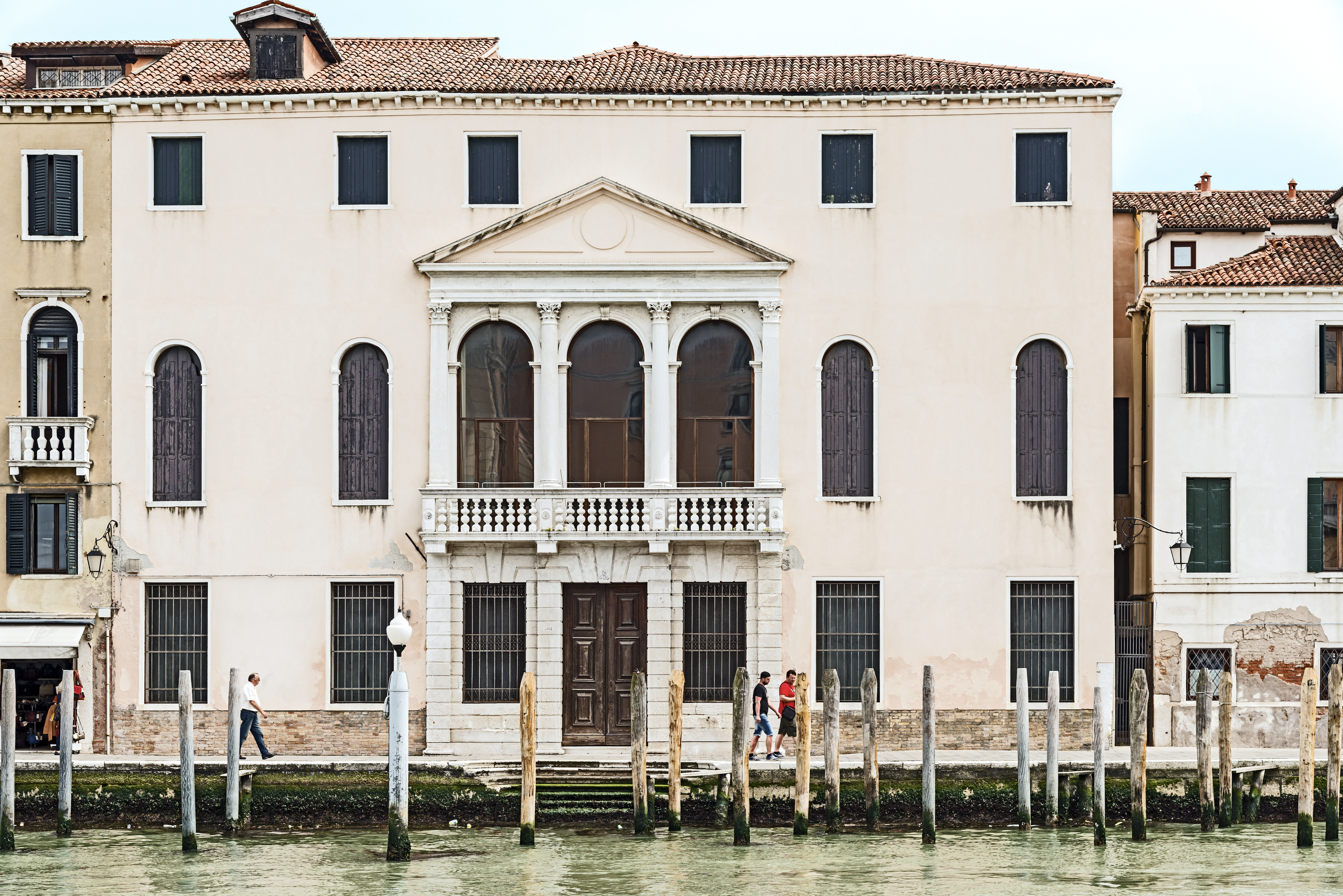
- Palazzo Emo Diedo
- Interactive map of the Palazzo Emo Diedo area

General information
- Type: Residential
- Architectural style: Neoclassical
- Location: Santa Croce district, Venice, Italy
- Coordinates: 45°26′22.56″N 12°19′16.99″E
- Construction stopped: 17th century

Technical details
- Floor count: 3

Design and construction
- Architect: Andrea Tirali

Palazzo Emo Diedo is a neoclassical palace in Venice, Italy located in the Santa Croce district, overlooking the Grand Canal, opposite the railway station. The building is located near San Simeone Piccolo.

== History ==
The 17th-century palace is an unfinished project by Andrea Tirali. The structure was built for the Emo family. The architectural style contrasts with then dominant Baroque architecture of Baldassarre Longhena. Then the palace passed to ownership of the Diedo family, hence the second name. Today, the palazzo is occupied by a charity organization.

== Architecture ==
The neoclassical façade consists of a ground floor, noble floor, and a loft of substantial size, for a total of three floors and twenty openings. In the central part of the ground floor there is a portal flanked by two quadrangular windows. The portal is covered with rustication. The noble floor offers a tall trifora decorated with a balustrade and large pediment. The façade terminates with a dentiled cornice. The rest of the façade is quite simple and unadorned. There is a garden in the back side of the structure.
