= Palazzo Marcello Toderini =

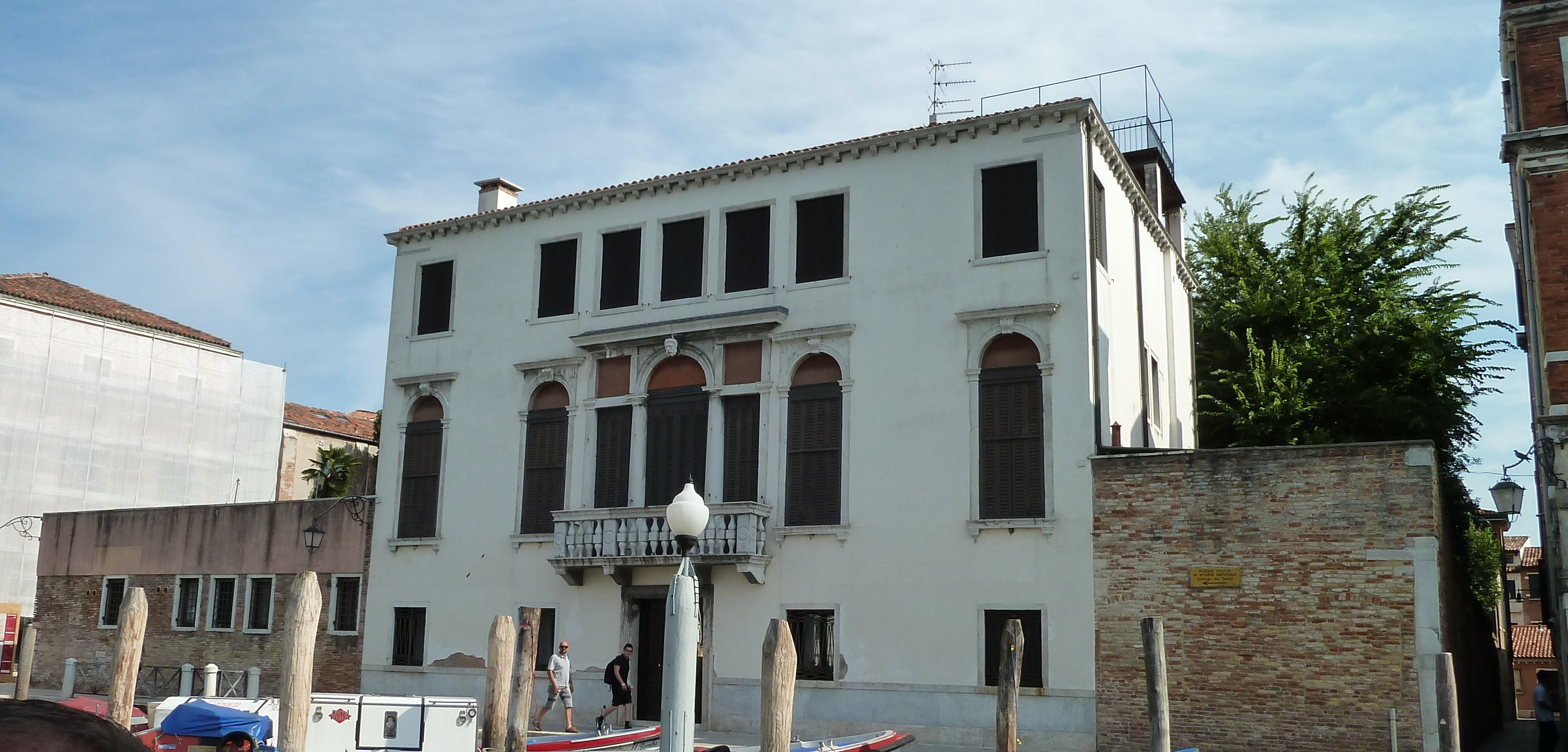
- Palazzo Marcello Toderini
- Interactive map of the Palazzo Marcello Toderini area

General information
- Type: Residential
- Architectural style: Renaissance
- Location: Santa Croce district, Venice, Italy
- Coordinates: 45°26′30.68″N 12°19′32.78″E
- Construction stopped: 17th century

Technical details
- Floor count: 3 levels

Palazzo Marcello Toderini is a small palace in Venice, in the Santa Croce sestiere, overlooking the Grand Canal on the Riva de Biasio. The structure is across the confluence of the Cannaregio Canal, between the Palazzo Zen and the Tassitura Luigi Bevilacqua.

== History ==
The small palace dates back to the 17th century. It was built by the ancient Roman family Marcello. Two Doges emerged from the family: Marcello Tegalliano (717–726) and Nicolò Marcello (1473–1474). Best known, however, are two brothers from this family who became musicians: Alessandro Marcello (1684–1750) and Benedetto Marcello (1686–1739).

== Architecture ==
The palace has three floors. The ground floor portal to Riva de Biasio is rectangular, there are the two pairs of single-light windows flanking it. The single noble floor features a large central serliana with a projecting balustraded balcony. This window is also flanked by two pairs of monoforas. There is a decorative cornice above the serliana, the central part of which has a mascaron at the top point of the round arch. The mezzanine floor under the roof has a window layout corresponding to that of the noble floor. The plastered and white-painted facade terminates at the top with a serrated eaves.

There is a large garden behind the palace.

== Gallery ==
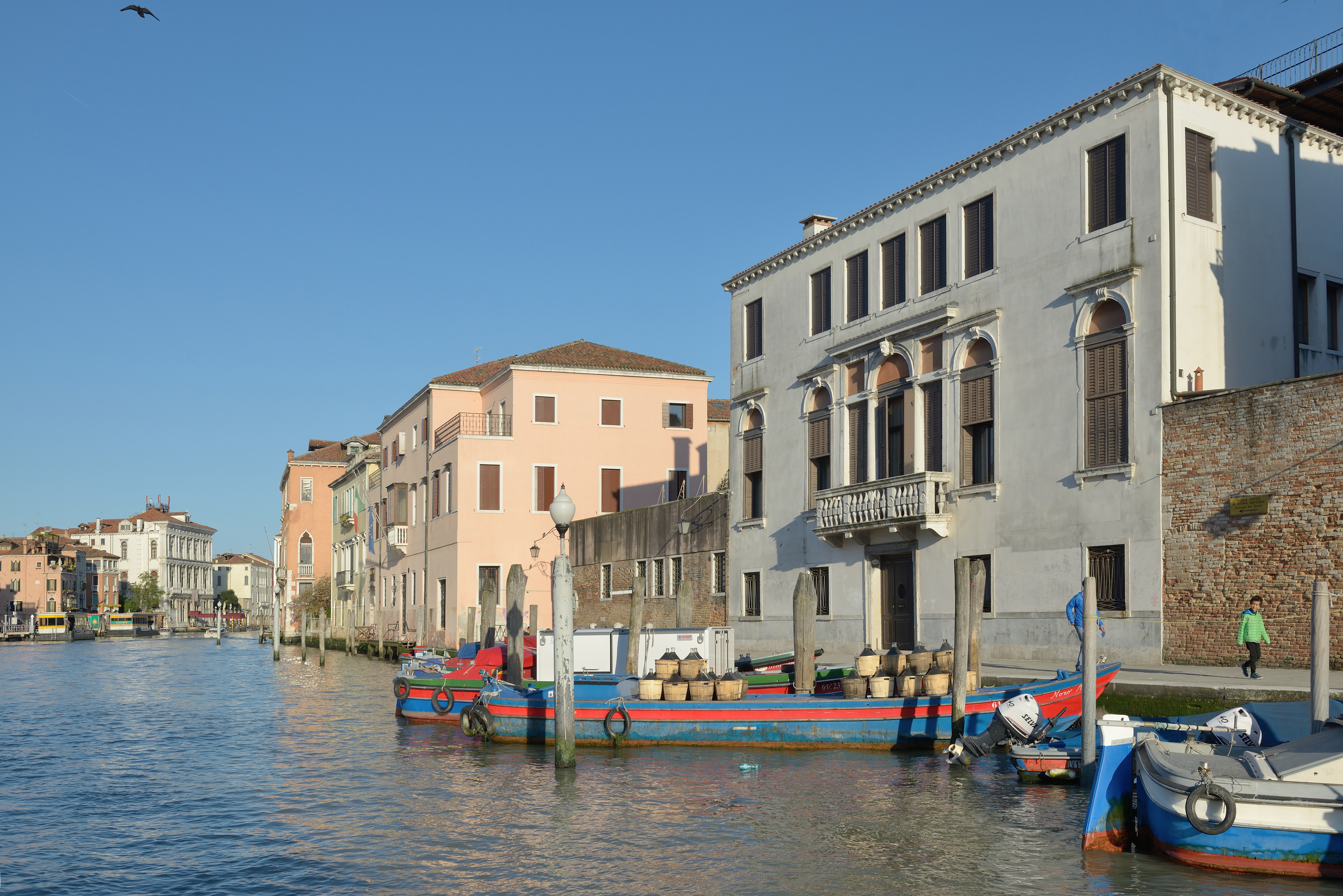
A corner view

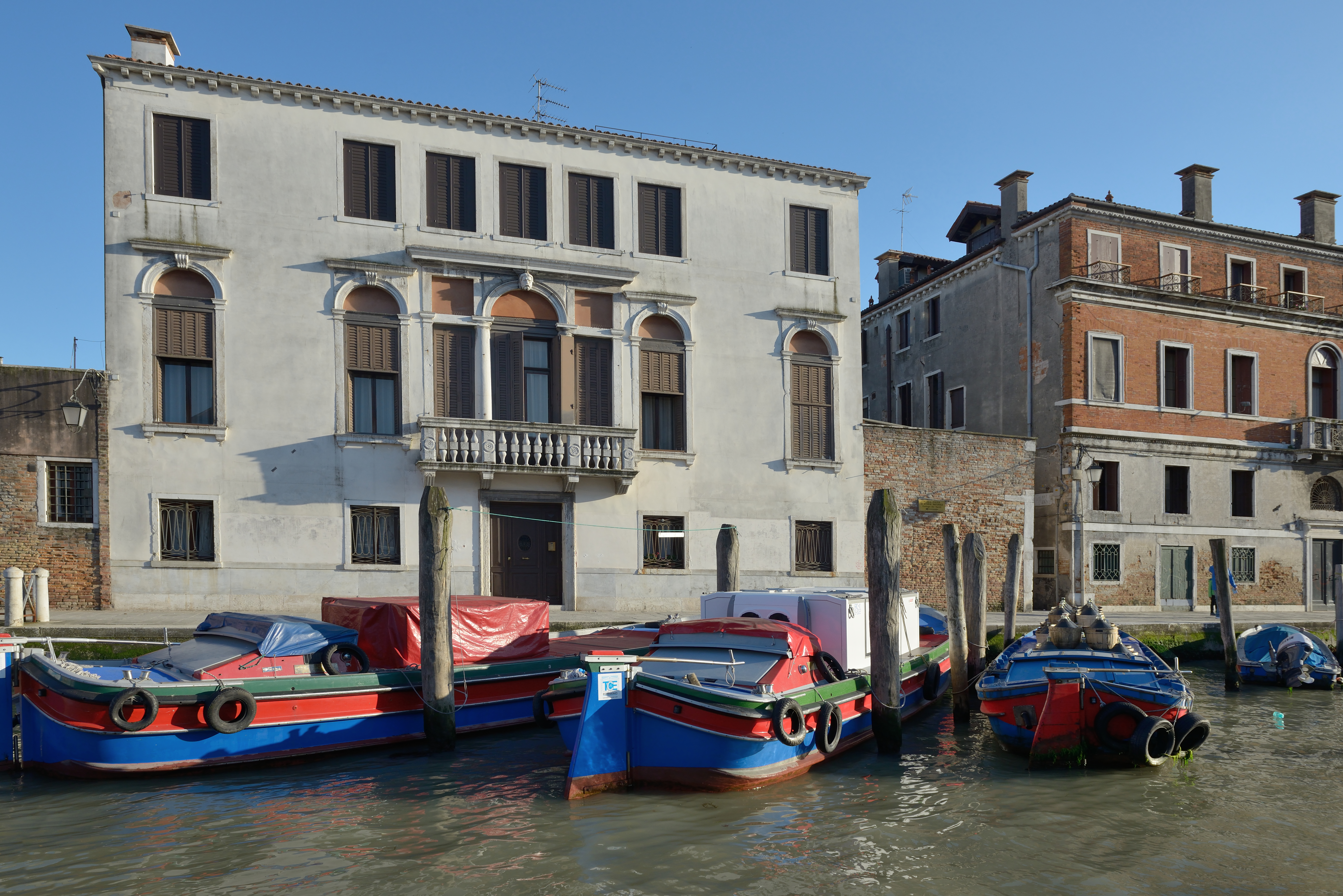
A view from Grand Canal

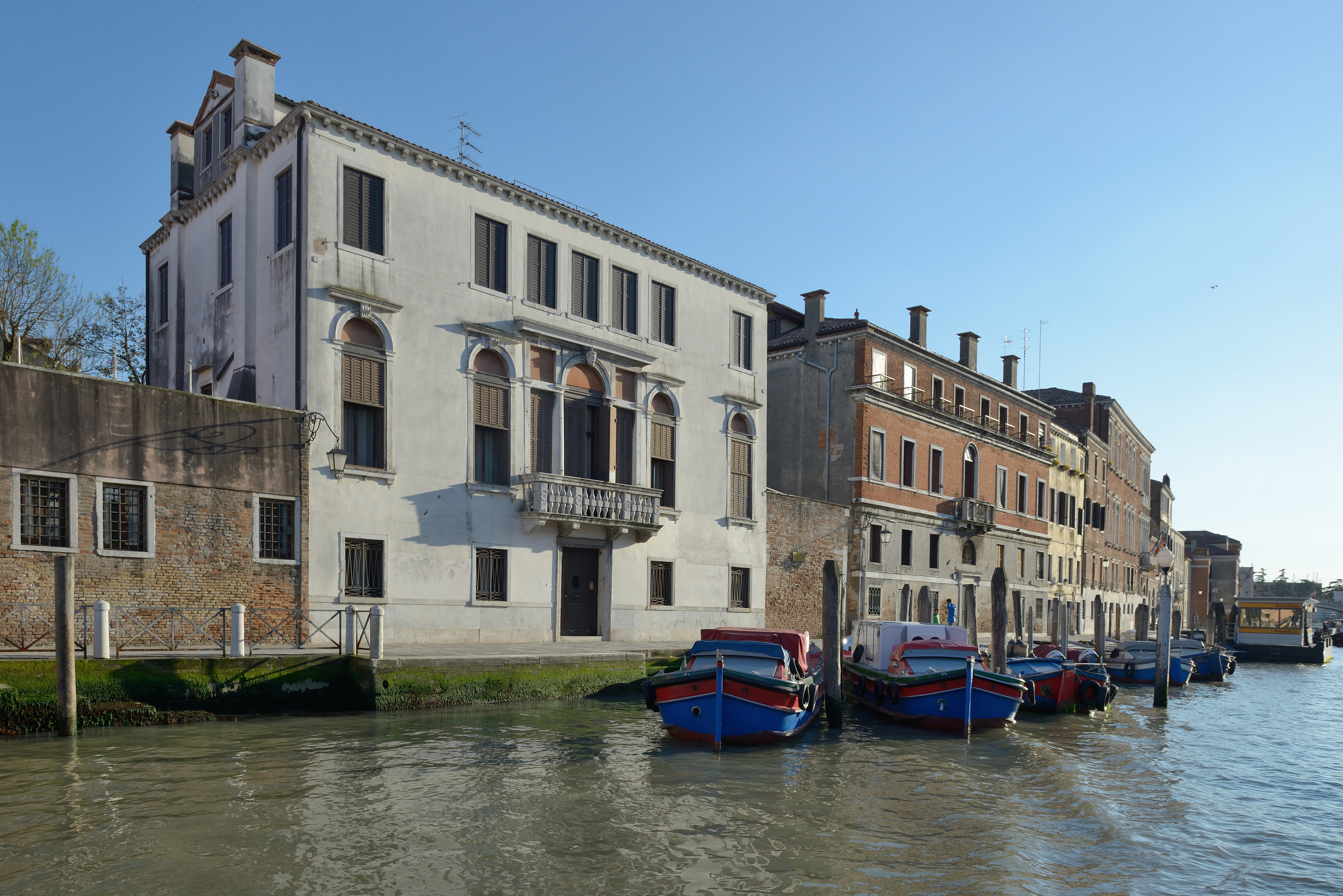
Another view from Grand Canal
