= Giovanni Buonconsiglio =

Italian painter

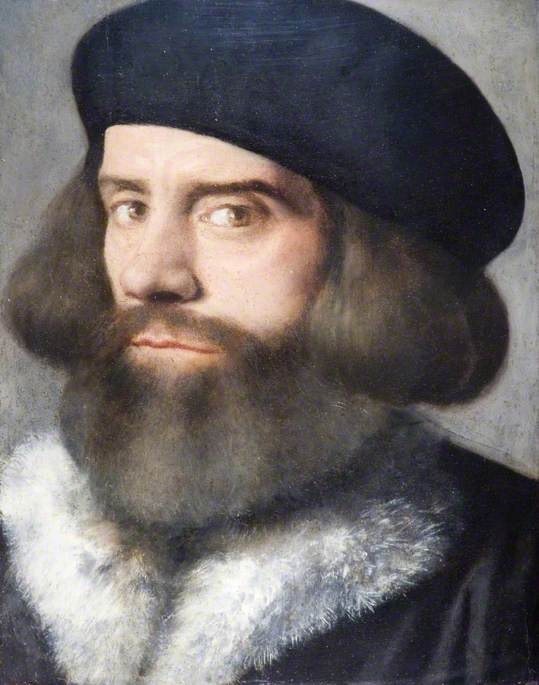
- Head of a Bearded Man, Birmingham Museums Trust
- Born: c. 1465; Montecchio Maggiore, Republic of Venice (now Italy)
- Died: 1535 or 1537; Padua, Republic of Venice (now Italy)
- Known for: Painting, fresco
- Movement: Italian Renaissance

Giovanni Buonconsiglio, also known as Il Marescalco, (born Montecchio Maggiore c. 1465, died 1535 or 1537; active during 1497–1514) was an Italian painter of the Renaissance period, active mainly in Venice and his native Vicenza.

== Biography ==
Buonconsiglio was probably apprenticed in Vicenza to Bartolomeo Montagna by 1484. His early work is heavily influenced by the style of Giovanni Bellini. He is documented as having settled in Venice on 22 January 1495, where he may have revived a friendship with Cima da Conegliano, whom he may have known in Vicenza. The few works predating 1497 that have been identified as Buonconsiglio’s are dominated by Lombard influences, the spatial and monumental qualities of Antonello da Messina and Mantegna being particularly evident, as well as the influence of Bramante.

Among these early works are the signed Pietà (c. 1495; Vicenza, Musei Civici di Arte e Storia) and a related drawing depicting Christ at the Column (Paris, Louvre). Generally considered to be his masterpiece, the Pietà reaches a level of perfection he was never to surpass nor often even to approach. The awkward figure of Christ lies rigidly at an angle to the picture plane, receding into it at the left, with head and shoulders resting against the Virgin, who is seated on a low, natural stone bench. Balancing these figures are those of St. John the Evangelist and Mary Magdalene, respectively standing and kneeling to the right of the picture’s centre. Greys, blues and olives predominate with the bright red of St. John’s mantle and the gold and green of Mary Magdalene’s elaborate garments in sharp contrast. The landscape background of this early masterpiece shows that Buonconsiglio must have known Mantegna or Domenico Morone well; Bramante’s influence is especially clear in the figure of St. John.

Also from this early period are the Beheading of St. Paul (Vicenza, San Lorenzo) and a corresponding drawing of A Soldier (ex-Koenig Col., Haarlem), fresco fragments in Montagnana Cathedral, the St. Catherine of Alexandria (Vicenza, Musei Civici di Arte e Storia) and a monochrome frieze (Venice, Col. Cini). A fragment from an altarpiece, signed and dated 1497, depicting St. Benedict, St. Tecla and St. Cosmas (Venice, Gallerie dell'Accademia), shows the dominating influence of Giovanni Bellini.

Buonconsiglio’s development in the first decade of the 16th century can be summarized by comparing two altarpieces with similar compositions: the large Virgin and Child Enthroned with St. Paul, St. Peter, St. Dominic and St. Sebastian (Vicenza, Musei Civici di Arte e Storia) is signed and dated 1502; the Virgin and Child Enthroned with Saints (Montagnana Cathedral) dates from 1507. Both depict the Virgin and Child enthroned on a raised pedestal flanked by equal groups of saints, and, as was typically Venetian, the figures are placed in a church aedicule. The earlier painting owes a great deal to Bellini: the figures of the Virgin and Child and St. Dominic and St. Sebastian, and the setting (a chapel covered in golden mosaics), are direct quotations from his San Giobbe altarpiece (Venice, Gallerie dell'Accademia). In the later painting, which shows Buonconsiglio having reached his maturity, the pedestal supporting the Virgin and Child has been lowered, resulting in a more nearly horizontal composition. Most impressive, however, is the difference in the structure and modelling of the figures in the two sacre conversazioni. In the earlier all surfaces are hard-edged and clearly differentiated, almost incised, while in the latter the figures, now more anatomically correct, are modelled with an almost sfumato technique.

Buonconsiglio’s Virgin and Child with St. John the Baptist and St. Catherine (c. 1508; Padua, Cassa di Risparmio) is notable for a landscape background that assimilates the influence of Dürer. Among Buonconsiglio’s portraits is an impressive Self-portrait (c. 1500; Rome, Capitoline Museums). Another important group of paintings spans the years between 1510 and 1515; St. Sebastian with St. Lawrence and St. Roch (c. 1510; Venice, San Giacomo dell’Orio), the Virgin and Child with St. Sebastian and St. Roch (1511; Montagnana Cathedral) and Christ the Redeemer with St. Jerome and St. George (c. 1513; Venice, Spirito Santo). Although the last two paintings show a certain fatigue, passages of real beauty may be seen in the altarpiece of St. Catherine with the Archangel Raphael and Tobias and St. Nicholas of Tolentino (1513; Montagnana Cathedral), which takes Cima da Conegliano as a model. Buonconsiglio frescoed the apse and left transept wall in Montagnana Cathedral between c. 1511 and 1513 with, respectively, an Assumption (possibly derived from the apse painting by Melozzo da Forlì in Santi Apostoli, Rome) and a Circumcision. Both survive in situ, although the Circumcision is in extremely poor condition.

Buonconsiglio’s latest significant works are the altarpiece of the Virgin and Child Enthroned with St. John the Baptist and St. Stephen (National Museum in Warsaw) and that for the church of St. Peter in Montecchio Maggiore (1519), his last signed and dated work.

== Gallery ==
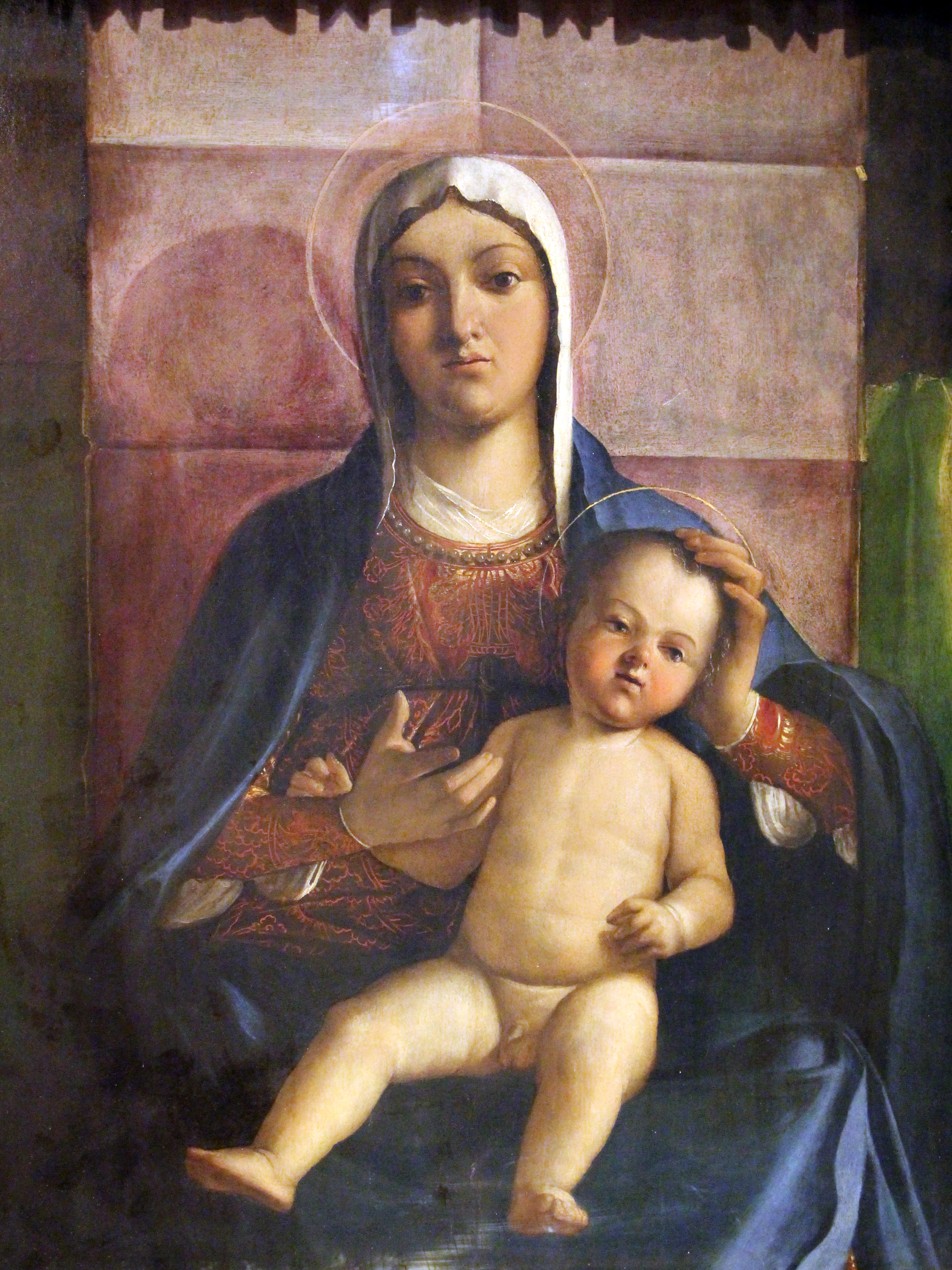
Madonna and Child, Museo Civico, Prato

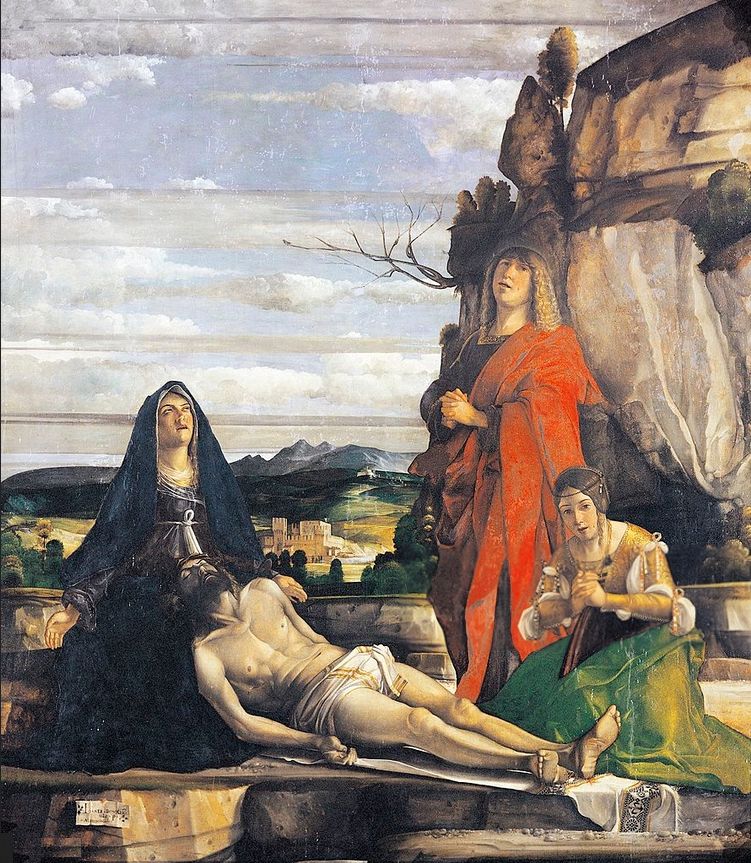
The Deposition, Museo Civico di Palazzo Chiericati, Vicenza

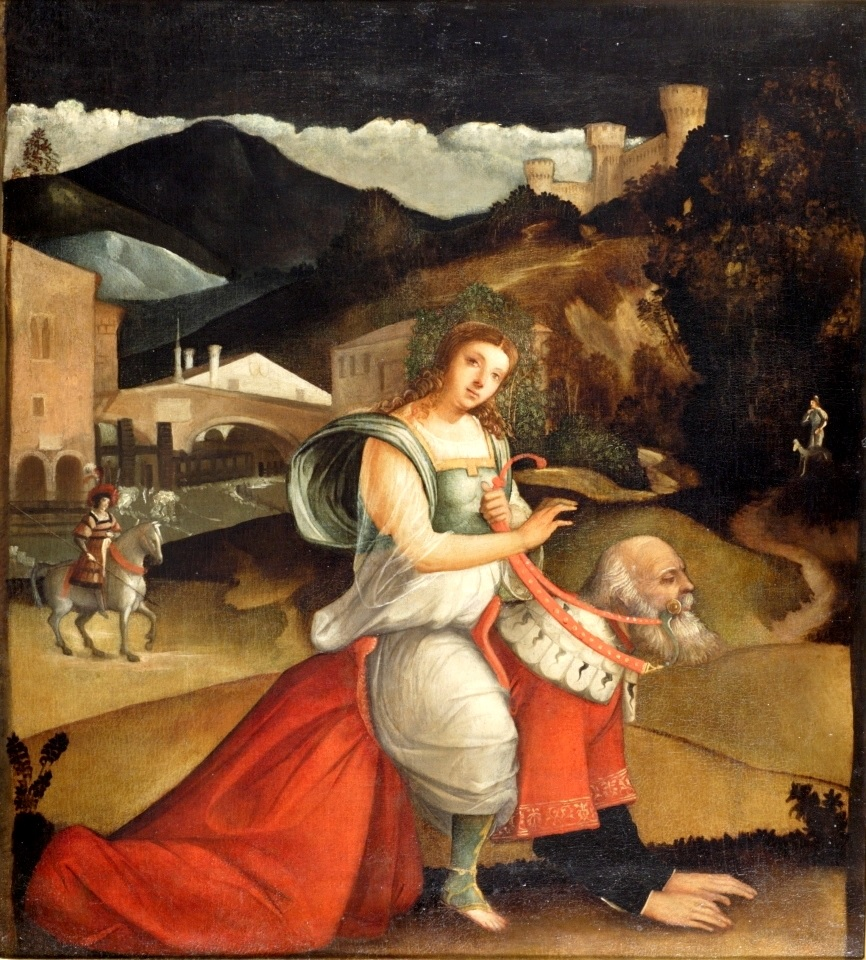
Phyllis and Aristotle, Wawel Castle, Old Town, Kraków, Poland

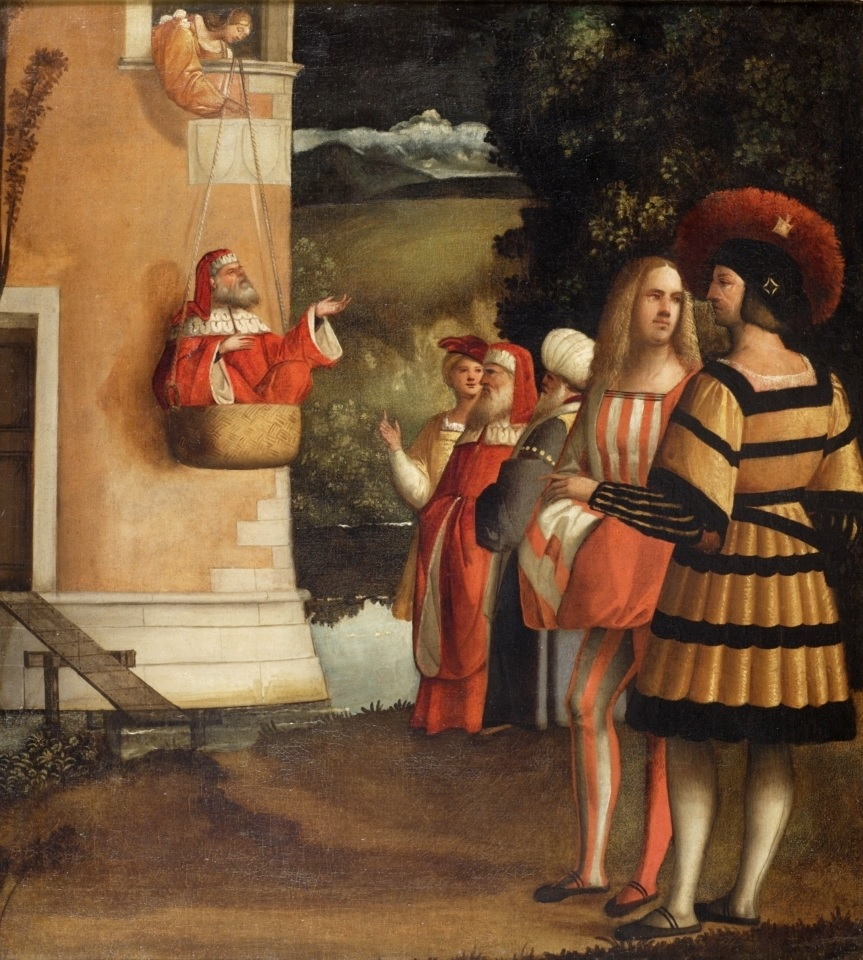
Virgil in a Basket, Wawel Castle, Old Town, Kraków, Poland

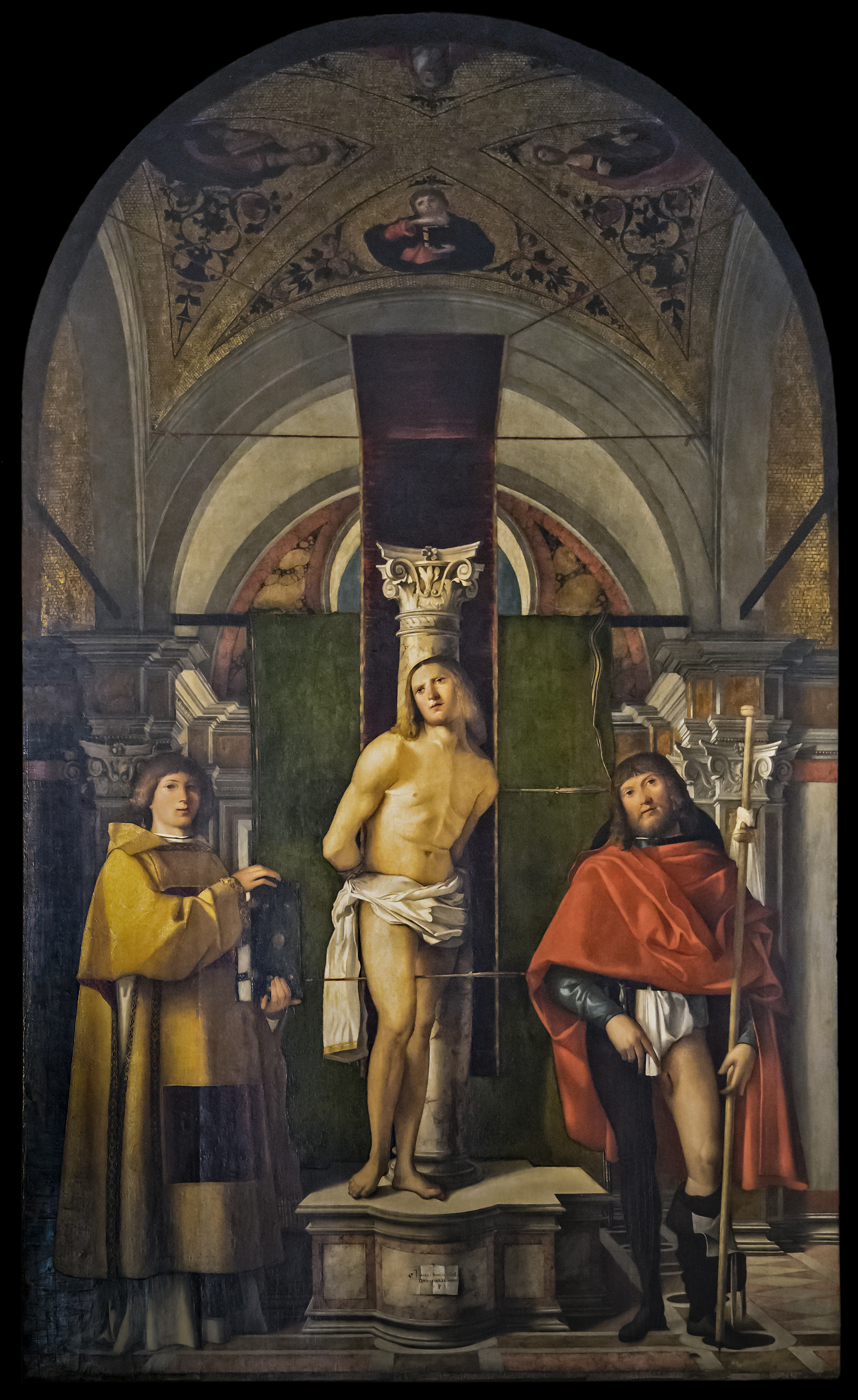
St. Sebastian with St. Lawrence and St. Roch, San Giacomo dall'Orio, Venice

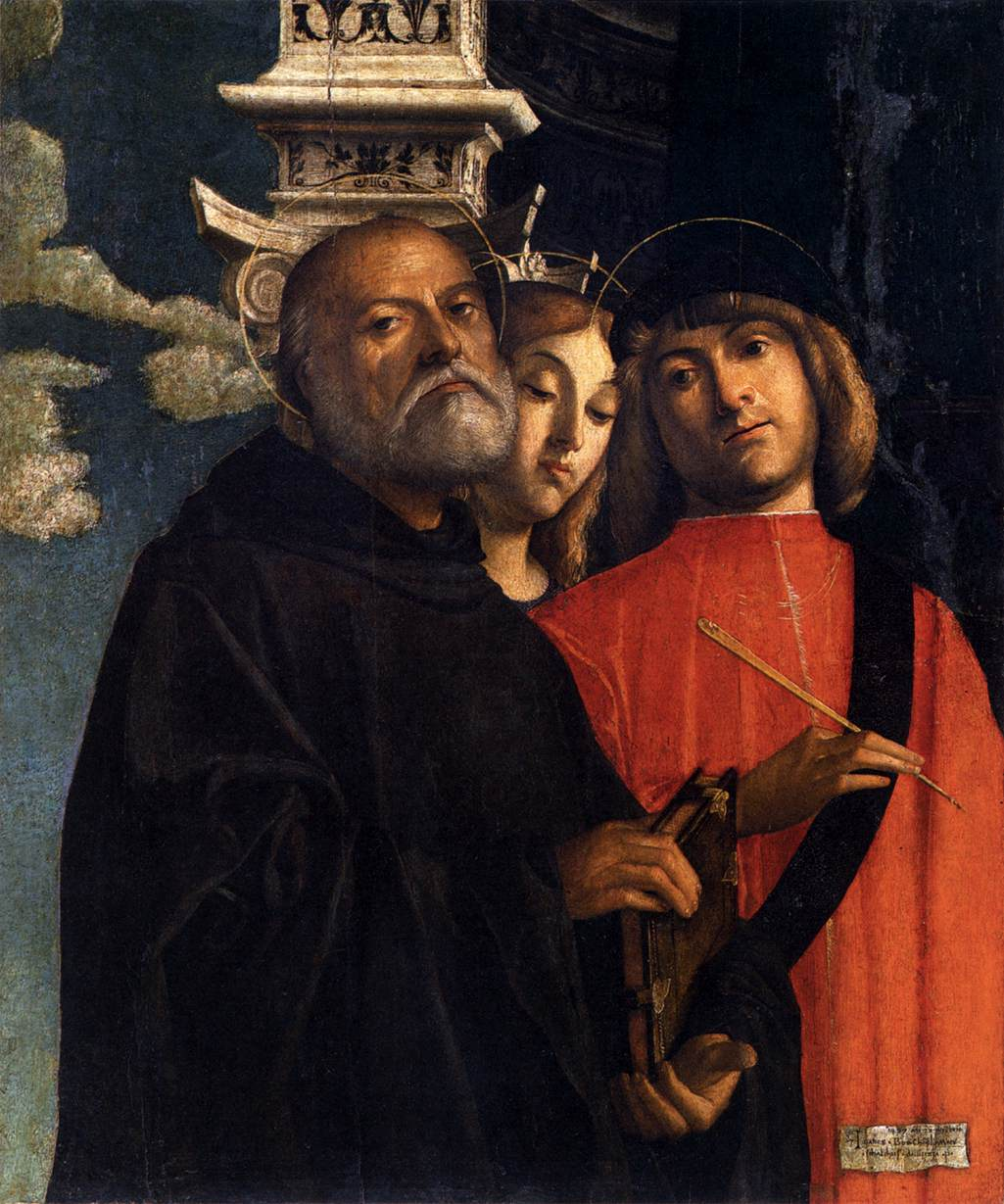
Giovanni Buonconsiglio - St. Benedict, St. Thecla, and St. Damian, Gallerie dell'Accademia, Venice

== Bibliography ==
- Borenius, Tancred (1909). The Painters of Vicenza, 1480–1550. London. pp. 155–204.
- Bryan, Michael (1886). Robert Edmund Graves (ed.). Dictionary of Painters and Engravers, Biographical and Critical. Vol. I: A-K. London: George Bell and Sons. p. 200.
- Herz, Alexandra (2003). "Buonconsiglio, Giovanni". Grove Art Online. Oxford University Press. doi:10.1093/oao/9781884446054.013.90000373203.
- Getty Museum Biography, entry on Buonconsiglio.
