= Santa Maria Maggiore, Venice =

Deconsecrated church in Venice, Italy

Chiesa di Santa Maria Maggiore
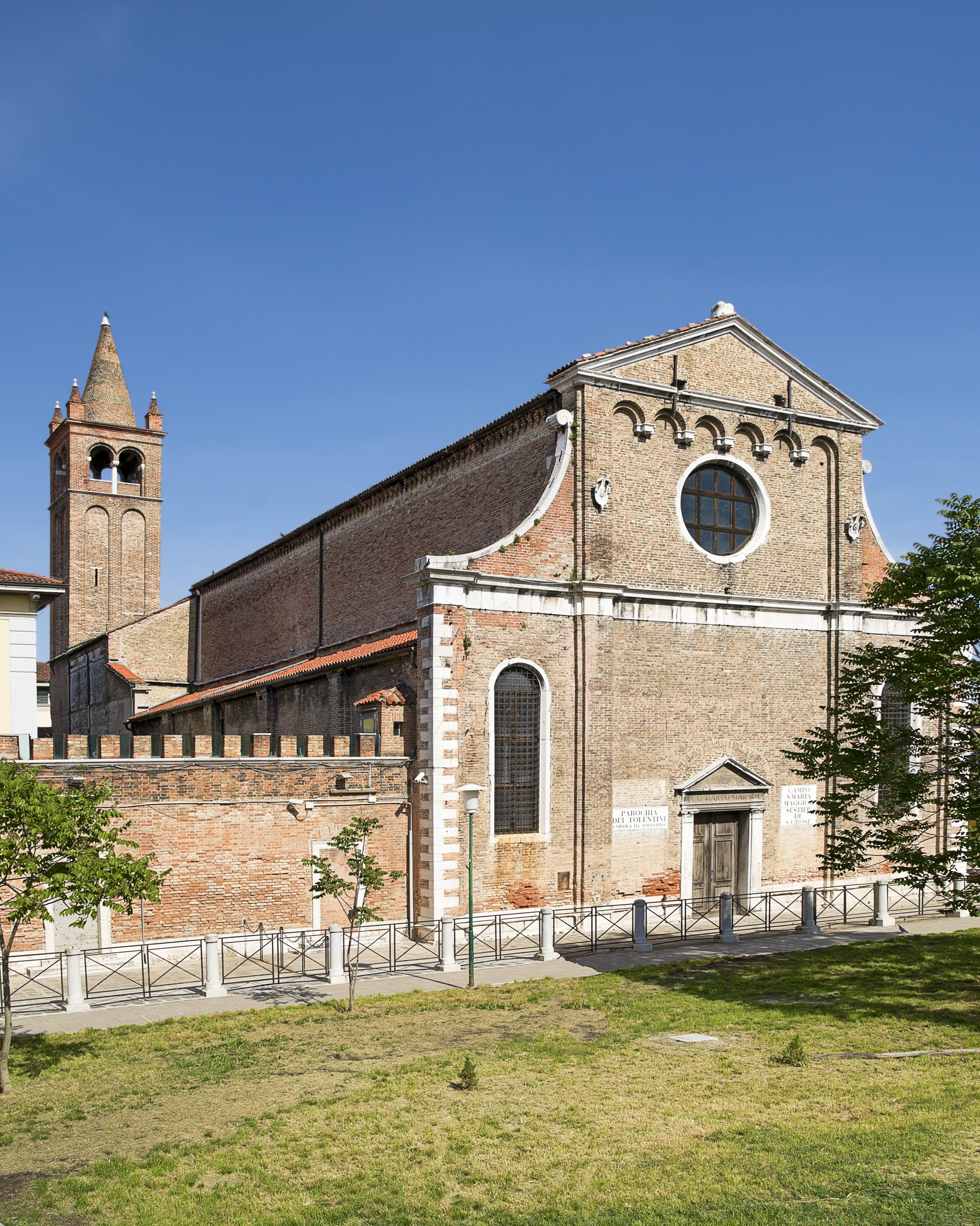
- Chiesa di Santa Maria Maggiore
- 45°26′06″N 12°19′01″E
- Location: Santa Croce, Venice
- Country: Italy
- Previous denomination: Catholic Church (deconsecrated)

History
- Founded: c. 1500
- Dedication: Mary, mother of Jesus

Architecture
- Architect: Tullio Lombardo

Administration
- Diocese: Patriarchate of Venice
- Parish: Tolentini, Venice

Santa Maria Maggiore is a former Catholic church, now deconsecrated, in the sestiere of Santa Croce, Venice. The church, which was completed at the start of the 16th century, as part of a convent, was suppressed and deconsecrated during the decade of the Napoleonic Kingdom of Italy. It has since has been used as a stable, and a tobacco warehouse, before forming part of the Santa Maria Maggiore prison.

== History ==
The church had its origins in a hermitage by Sant'Agnese church in Dorsoduro. The convent was granted land by local administrators on 11 November 1497. Tullio Lombardo participated in its construction and marble decoration from 1500 to 1505. By virtue of the Napoleonic decree of the Kingdom of Italy of 5 June 1805 (and subsequent decrees), a process of suppression and transformation of churches and monasteries and changes in parish boundaries was initiated in Venice. The church, together with the adjoining convent, and Franciscan monastery was abolished in 1805.

The convent was also damaged in its load-bearing structures by a fire in 1817, so it was no longer used until its demolition in the early years of the 20th century. The church's buildings were used as barracks, and the sisters moved to the church of Santa Croce. Their church, deconsecrated and stripped of its furnishings and paintings, began to be used as a stable. The monastery square, renamed Campo di Marte, became a place where Austrian officers practised horse riding. It was also accessible to civilians.

In 1900, the monastery was demolished and the church was used as a tobacco warehouse. On this occasion, the interior of the building was rebuilt. Between 1920 and 1930 the Carceri Giudiziarie prison was built on the monastery grounds, after which prisoners were transferred there from the Palazzo delle Prigioni a San Marco.

The church was restored between 1961 and 1965. In the late 1960s, the 19th-century additions were removed. The main nave was decorated with a fresco depicting the Exaltation of the Cross, Souls in Purgatory, and Our Lady in Glory with St. Francis. The fresco, dated 1700, was torn down during the aforementioned renovations to allow for the restoration of the damaged plaster.

== Architecture ==
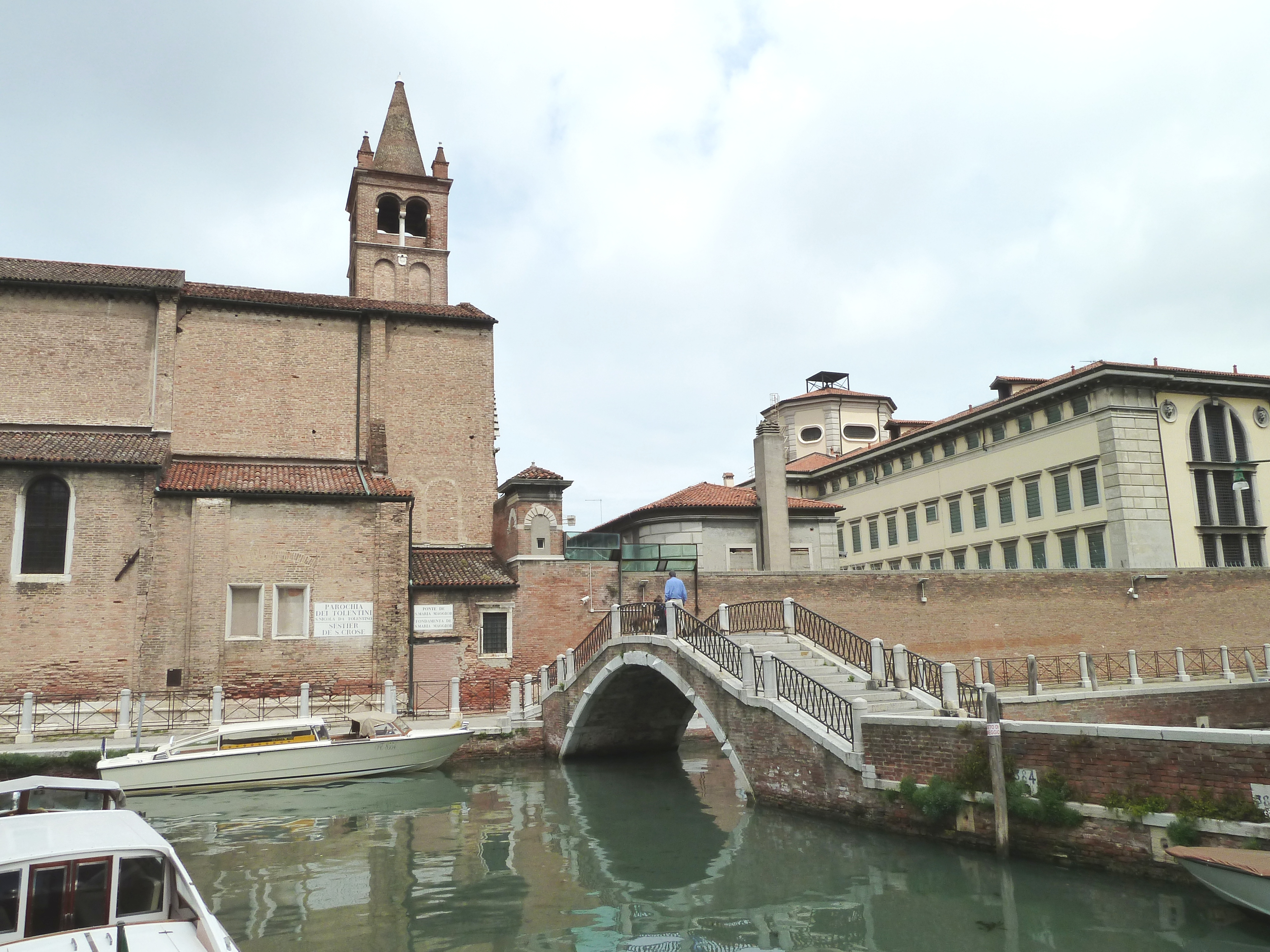
The church from the side of the rio Santa Maria Maggiore

The design of the 16th-century brick façade is attributed to Tullio Lombardo. Its Renaissance character is evidenced by such compositional elements as: a simple portal, a cornice in the central part, its triangular finial and gentle arches connecting it with the side parts. The church was built as a three-nave basilica with a long presbytery, flanked by shallow chapels. It had a total of 11 altars: the main altar, 2 altars in the side chapels and 4 in the side aisles. The invocations of 8 of them are known: Saints of the Order, Coronation of the Blessed Virgin Mary, St. Marcellus, St. Nicholas, Ascension, St. Clare, Our Lady of Sorrows and St. John. The side aisles are separated from the main nave by five paired columns with Ionic capitals, which support semicircular arches. Traces of a fresco depicting a simulated colonnade are visible on the right wall.

Eight altars and the works of art that adorned them were removed and/or lost. Among the paintings was St. John the Baptist by Giovanni Bellini, commissioned for the chapel next to the main altar. The painting was to be transferred to the Pinacoteca di Brera in Milan, but after a local protest it was given to the Accademia. The canvas Assumption of the Blessed Virgin Mary by Paolo Veronese, located in the main altar, has undergone conservation and is also in the Accademia's collection. Since 2008, its collection also includes the Virgin and Child with Saints and Members of the Marcello Family, probably by Giambattista del Moro. The collection of the Pinacoteca includes: The Agony in the Garden of Olives (Veronese), The Victory of the Chartres over the Normans (Alessandro Varotari "Padovanino") and Madonna and Child with a Choir of Cherubim (Andrea Mantegna).

Built on a square plan, the campanile without bells rises to a height of 33 m. It is decorated with the coat of arms of the Malipiero family. It is topped with a Gothic conical spire, surrounded by four pinnacles.

The only document that testifies to the appearance of the monastery is an engraving in a manuscript from 1806. On the left side of the church façade there was an entrance to the monastery, leading through a long atrium to a spacious courtyard, limited on three sides by a cloister. The second monastery, located between this courtyard and the Santa Maria Maggiore square, was the oldest building, built together with the church.

== Bibliography ==
- Guide d'Italia (Guide Rosse series) - Venice - Touring Club Italiano. p. 493.
