= San Giacomo dell'Orio Altarpiece =

1546 painting by Lorenzo Lotto

San Giacomo dell'Orio Altarpiece (Madonna and Four Saints)
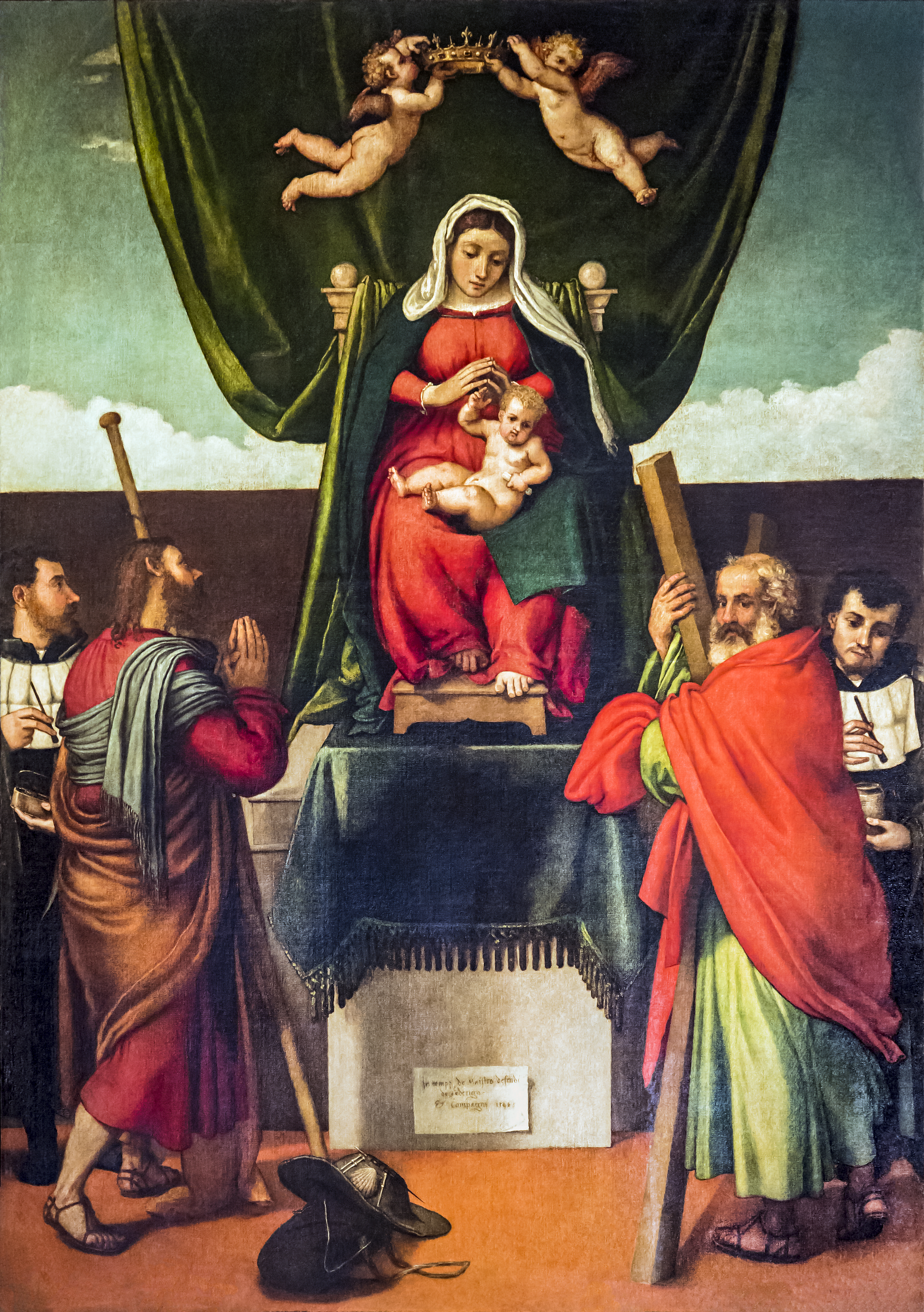
- Artist: Lorenzo Lotto
- Year: 1546
- Medium: Oil on canvas
- Dimensions: 240 cm × 171 cm (94 in × 67 in)
- Location: Church of San Giacomo dell'Orio; Venice

The San Giacomo dell'Orio Altarpiece (or Madonna and Four Saints) is an oil-on-canvas painting by the Italian High Renaissance artist Lorenzo Lotto, dating from 1546 and housed in the church of San Giacomo dell'Orio in Venice. It is signed and dated on the cartouche hanging at the throne's base, reading "In tempo de Maistro Defendi de Federigo et compagni 1546 Lor. Lot". The canvas is one of the last works executed by Lotto in Venice before he relocated to the Marche.

== Description ==
The inscription explains that the work was commissioned by a brotherhood in Venice that organized popular devotion. It is a typical Holy conversation composition, with the Madonna on a high throne in front of a green drapery, surrounded by a group of saints. They are, at the sides, Cosmas and Damian, and James, son of Zebedee and Andrew the Apostle. Two angels hold a crown above Mary.

== See also ==
- Altarpiece of the Halberd

== Sources ==
- Pirovano, Carlo (2002). Lotto. Milan: Electa. ISBN 88-435-7550-3.
