= San Zan Degola =

Church in Venice, Italy

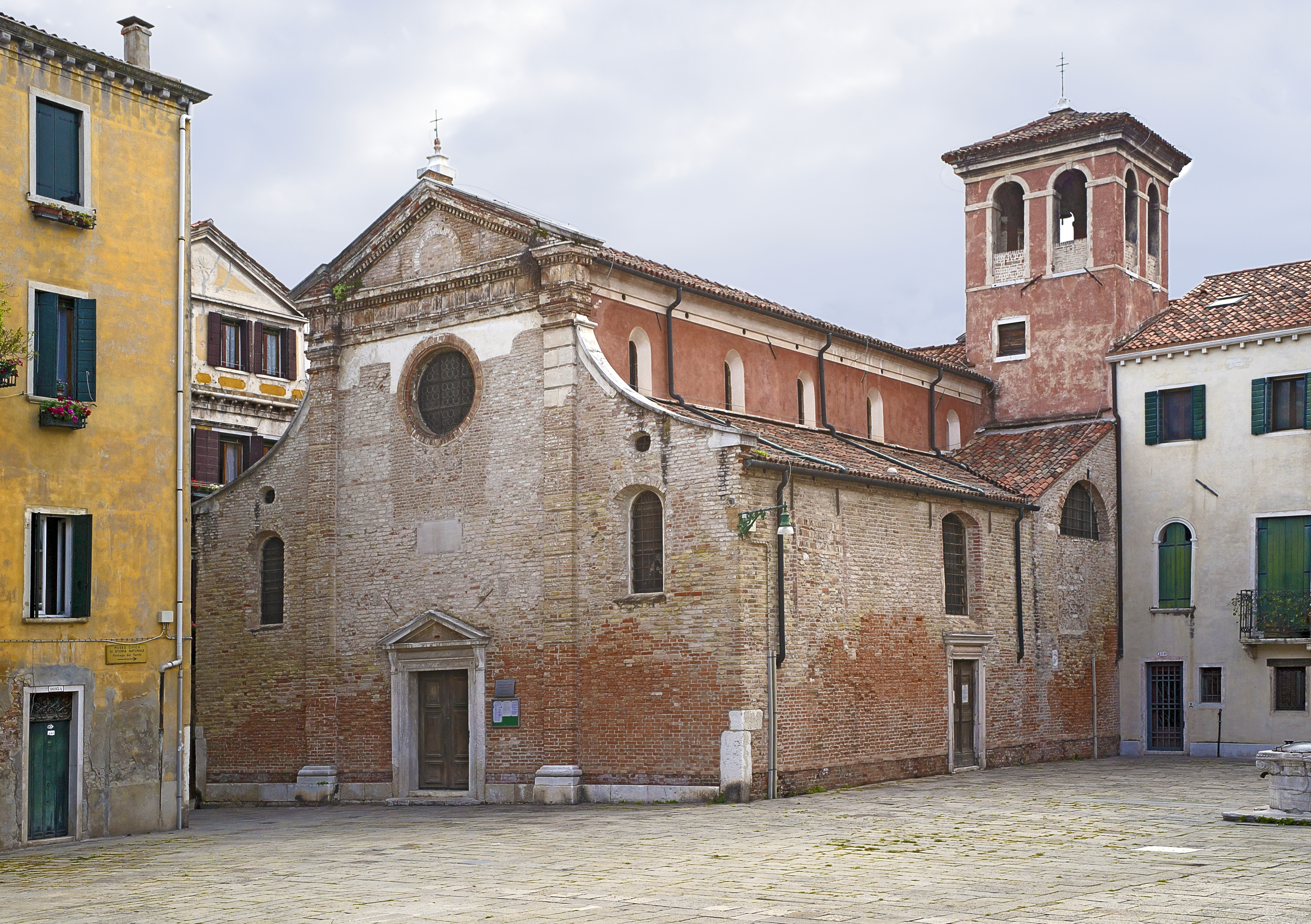

- Location within Venice Location within Italy

Religion
- Affiliation: Roman Catholic
- Province: Venice

Location
- Location: Venice, Italy
- Coordinates: 45°26′30″N 12°19′40″E

The church of San Zan Degolà, which in the Venetian dialect is the abbreviation for San Giovanni Decollato, in English St John (the Baptist) beheaded, is a Byzantine-Romanesque-style church and belltower in the sestiere of Santa Croce in Venice, Italy.

== History ==
A church was built on the site in the 11th century by the Venier family in gratitude and celebration for a Venetian victory, in which this family had participated, over the Genoese in Negroponte. In 1213, the church was restored by the Pesaro family. A later reconstruction occurred in 1713.

The church contains some of its original early medieval frescoes. Reconstructions were pursued over the centuries, and funded by noble families of Venice. The church is now also used for Russian Orthodox services in Venice.

== Sources ==
- Churches of Venice entry
