= Palazzo Corner della Regina =

Building in Venice, Italy

Coordinates: 45°26′26″N 12°19′56″E

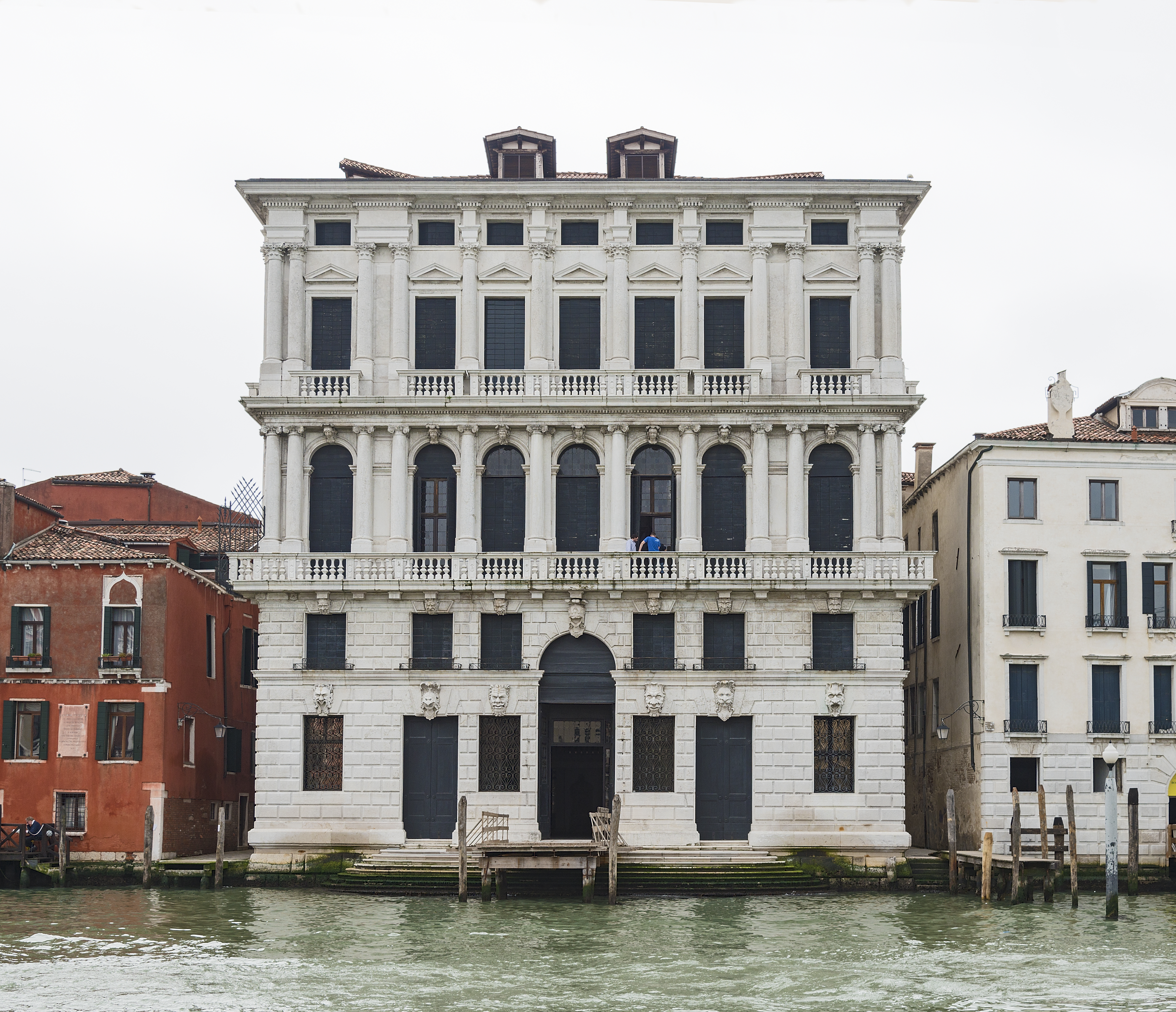
Grand Canal facade

Palazzo Corner della Regina, commonly known as Ca' Corner della Regina, is a Baroque-style palace in the Sestiere Santa Croce of the city of Venice, Italy. In the English language, the title conforms with Palace of the Queen from the "Corner (or Cornaro) Family"; it is so named because Caterina Cornaro, who became Queen of Cyprus by marriage, was born to this family and at this site in 1454. The palace is located on the Grand Canal, near Ca' Pesaro, and between Ca' Favretto and Palazzo Correggio. The opposite structure is Palazzo Contarini Pisani.

== History ==
The present white palace facade, bedecked with columns on the two top floors, was designed by Giuseppe Sardi in the second half of the 17th century, while the palace was reconstructed in 1724 by Domenico Rossi. The lower story has a sturdy brick-like pattern of ashlar stone masonry. The lower doors and windows are surmounted by grotesque-like masks that serve as waterspouts, hence can be called gargoyles. The upper floors have balconies with balustrades. In the upper floor, the balcony window-doors have triangular pediments. The main floor or piano nobile has tall window-doors with a rounded top and helmeted female busts at the keystone.

The palace hosted the last of the Corner, a priest, until 1800, when the palace was willed to the Papal authorities, who ceded the palace to the Congregation of the Schools of Charity (Cavanis Institute) to establish a school. It subsequently became the city's Monte de Pieta.

The palace now houses the History Archives of the Contemporary Art Exhibition of the Biennale di Venezia, as well as having display space for the Fondazione Prada. The piano nobile frescoes were commissioned by a Caterino Cornaro, a distant descendant of the famous queen, and completed by Constantino Cedini, Vincenzo Colomba and Domenico Fossati; they depict a series of episodes from Queen Caterina Cornaro's life.
