= Giovanni Dario =

Venetian official (1414-1494)

Giovanni Dario (Latin: Johannes Darius, Greek: Ἰωάννης Δαρεῖος; 1414–1494) was a Venetian official who served multiple times as ambassador of the Republic of Venice. His family hailed from Crete, a Venetian colony at the time; his knowledge of Greek allowed him to serve as interpreter and envoy to Constantinople during the last years of the Byzantine Empire. After the Fall of Constantinople he rose to the position of secretary of the Duke of Crete, and from 1464 entered service with the Signoria of Venice. He was repeatedly sent as ambassador to the court of the Ottoman Empire and the Mamluk Sultanate, most notably helping conclude the First Ottoman–Venetian War in 1479.

== Life ==
=== Early life ===
Giovanni Dario was born in 1414 to a Venetian family established in Kastelli Pediadas on Crete; His father, Marco, was a merchant who often travelled abroad, to Venice and Constantinople, often accompanied by his brother, Giovanni, and eventually by his own sons, Giovanni and Zaccaria, and their brother-in-law, Giorgio Pantaleo. By 1450, Giovanni began his career in the Venetian administration as a notary; although noted for his excellent command of both Greek and Latin, he failed to be appointed chancellor of Chania (Canea). Nevertheless, from August of the same year he served as interpreter to Niccolò da Canal during the latter's embassy to the Byzantine imperial court in Constantinople, and then to the Despotate of the Morea. In 1451 he unsuccessfully competed for the post of chancellor in Siteia (Sitia), and then Rethymno (Retimo).

Dario's life during the next years is obscure. A later tradition, which however is not supported by any available evidence, holds that during the Fall of Constantinople he was the unnamed Italian who along with the famous humanist Cyriacus of Ancona is said to have accompanied Sultan Mehmed II, reading to him from the works of ancient historians. This tradition has been disproven, not least since Cyriacus was noted for his anti-Ottoman stance and was likely dead by 1453; but it is likely true that Dario and Cyriacus were acquainted and present together at Constantinople some time before 1453, as Cyriacus is connected with a sketch, drawn by Dario, of the equestrian statue surmounting the Column of Justinian that is now in the University of Budapest library. In 1458 Dario is attested in Crete as chancellor of the island's captain, Angelo Gradenigo, in 1460 as a notary of the great council of Crete, and likely again in 1463–64, when he corresponded with his friend, the scholar Michael Apostolius, who had settled in Crete after the Fall of Constantinople.

=== Move to Venice and diplomatic career ===
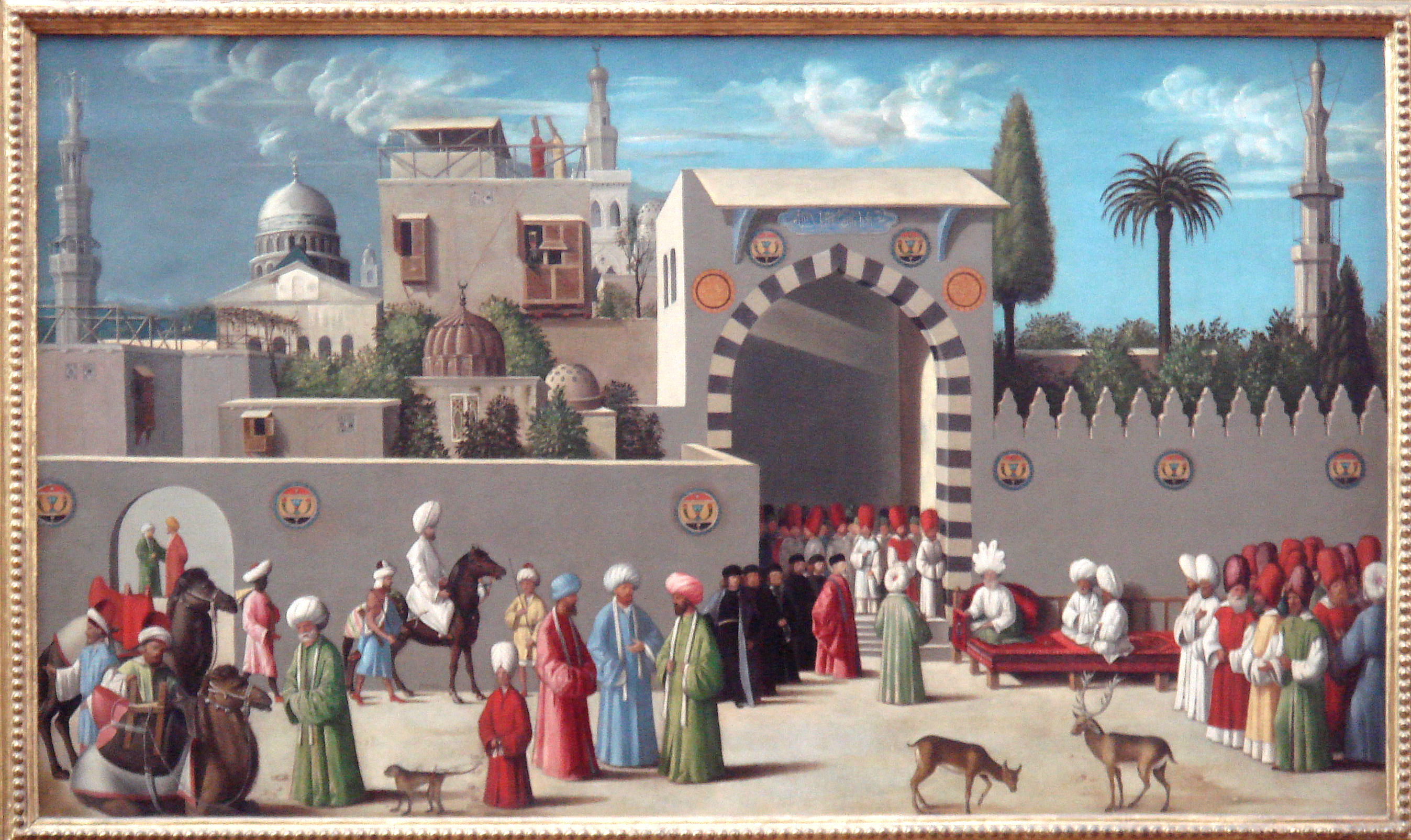
Painting of a Venetian embassy to the Mamluk governor of Damascus, workshop of Giovanni Bellini

From 1464 on, Dario resided in Venice, where he could better pursue his ambitions, entering the service of the Signoria of Venice; he even did not take up the position of chancellor of Chania to which he was appointed in 1466, partly due to the plague ravaging Crete at the time. In 1470 he was inscribed among the notaries of the Avogadoria de Comùn, but he also began his diplomatic career, being sent as part of an embassy of Triadano Gritti to Milan to mediate in the dispute between the Duke of Milan and the Duke of Modena over possession of Correggio. On his return from Milan, Dario was sent to Constantinople as part of Niccolò Cocco's embassy seeking to conclude a peace in the ongoing war between Venice and the Ottoman Empire. He resisted returning to Venice until ordered to do so in 1471, was in Crete in early 1472, and back in Venice in August/September.

In 1473 Dario was entrusted for the first time with leading an embassy himself, to the Mamluk Sultanate of Egypt, on the occasion of the imprisonment of Venetian merchants and the local Venetian consul at Damascus. The mission was a success, and Dario managed to conclude a treaty of friendship with the Mamluks. As the negotiations for a peace with the Ottomans continued without success, in late 1474 Dario and Gerolamo Zorzi were sent to the Ottoman sultan and brought back terms to Venice. In August 1477, after new incidents with the Mamluks, Dario was sent to Egypt again.

=== Conclusion of peace with the Ottomans ===
Dario's skill was recognized by the Great Council of Venice, and in May 1478 he was recommended to assist the provveditore d'armata Tommaso Malipiero in his negotiations with the Ottomans on his return from Egypt, but Dario did not return to Italy until June 1478. Nevertheless, as Malipiero managed to come to terms with the Ottoman pasha of Rumelia, on 18 November the Venetian Senate granted Dario extensive powers and sent him as ambassador to the Ottoman court, at Constantinople or Adrianople, in order to confirm the agreement. Venice's need to conclude peace was pressing, and this was reflected in Dario's instructions: he was given permission to accede to any demands Mehmed II might make, in exchange for restoring the Republic's access to the Levantine trade. As the historian Maria Francesca Tiepolo remarks, Diedo's choice was not simply due to his skill in Greek and Italian, but also because he was not a patrician; thus the expected onerous peace would not besmirch the honour and reputation of a patrician ambassador.

After long negotiations, on 25 January 1479 Dario concluded a peace treaty with the Ottomans. The terms were heavy, as Venice was forced to cede the fortresses of Scutari and Croia in the Adriatic Sea, the Aegean islands of Lemnos and Euboea, and the Mani Peninsula in southern Greece. In exchange, against an annual payment, the Republic again received the right to trade freely and without taxation in the Ottoman Empire, and maintain a trade colony in Constantinople under its own official (bailo). The Sultan dismissed Dario with many honours, including three gold-cloth kaftans; while according to some accounts, Dario was knighted by the Sultan as well. Dario returned to Venice, accompanied by an Ottoman envoy, Lütfi Bey, on 16 April 1479, to oversee the treaty's ratification. Dario was likewise entrusted with overseeing the implementation of the treaty, specifically the return of Venetian fortresses and territories captured by the Ottomans during the war, a process which was not completed until 1480, as well as the release of Venetian prisoners; as many of the latter had been sold into slavery, only a few were ever actually returned. For this purpose, in March 1480 Dario was again sent to Constantinople, alongside Niccolò Cocco, the new ambassador to the Sultan. In recompense for his services, the Signoria gave his brother Zaccaria a lifetime appointment as a scribe in the law court of Giustizia Nova.

In December 1480 Dario was in Venice, presenting his report (relazione), but aimed to return to Constantinople to complete the territorial arrangements of the treaty. His arrival was delayed by the anti-Ottoman uprising of Venice's stradioti in Mani under Krokodeilos Kladas and Theodore Bua in January 1481, and his mission was resumed in late April until news arrived of the death of Mehmed in late May. After that, Dario assisted in the deliberations about the brief of the new ambassador, Antonio Vitturi.

=== Missions to Bayezid II ===
In late 1483, Dario was again sent to Constantinople to maintain good relations with the new Sultan, Bayezid II, especially in view of Venice's involvement in the War of Ferrara. Dario was to obtain Ottoman recognition for the Venetian occupation of the Ionian Islands of Zakynthos and Cephalonia in 1482, as well as sound out the possibility of common operations against the Kingdom of Naples. Dario's mission is well attested, largely due to his own dispatches to the Signoria. By April 1484, Dario secured the Sultan's consent for the latter, but made otherwise little headway otherwise, as the Ottomans were distrustful of Venice's intentions, especially following the conclusion of the War of Ferrara and the news of Bayezid's half-brother, Cem Sultan, being hosted in European courts and used as a pawn in their designs against Bayezid. From September 1484 to summer 1485 Dario remained at Adrianople, where Bayezid resided at the time; the 19th-century scholar Guglielmo Berchet ascribed Dario a voyage to Persia during this time, but this is likely due to an error in the translation of the dispatches. In October 1485 Dario was joined by his nephew, Francesco, who came to learn the details of diplomatic trade-craft. By spring 1486, Dario received a gift of lands worth 1,500 at Noventa Padovana, and his natural daughter Maria a 600 ducats from the Senate for her dowry. He remained at the Ottoman court until June 1486, when he was brusquely ordered to depart, apparently due to the actions of the Venetian bailo, Ermolao Minio.

On his return to Venice in autumn 1486, Dario received extraordinary honours: the right to bear arms, and assist in the sessions of the Council of Ten when the boards of the savi were also invited to attend. He participated in discussions with Ottoman envoys, and was invited to return to Constantinople for another embassy. The Venetian government agreed in March 1487, and the Council of Ten raised his daughter's dowry to 1000 ducats. He arrived in Constantinople in May before moving to Adrianople, where he was received with many honours, in recompense for his earlier dismissal. He was back in Venice by spring 1488.

Dario built a palace, the Palazzo Dario, in Venice, which he dedicated to the genio urbis, the guardian spirit of Venice. He died in May 1494 and was buried on the island of Santa Maria della Grazia. Apart from his natural daughter Maria, who married Vincenzo Barbaro in 1492 or 1493, he did not have legitimate offspring. His heirs were Maria and his nephew Francesco.

== Sources ==
- Babinger, Franz (1961). Johannes Darius (1414 - 1491), Sachwalter Venedigs im Morgenland, und sein griechischer Umkreis (in German). Munich: Verlag der Bayerischen Akademie der Wissenschaften. OCLC 54905371.
- Babinger, Franz (1992) [1978]. Mehmed the Conqueror and His Time. Bollingen Series 96. Translated from the German by Ralph Manheim. Edited, with a preface, by William C. Hickman. Princeton, New Jersey: Princeton University Press. ISBN 0-691-09900-6. OCLC 716361786.
- Raby, Julian (1980). "Cyriacus of Ancona and the Ottoman Sultan Mehmed II". Journal of the Warburg and Courtauld Institutes. 43: 242–246. JSTOR 751201.
- Setton, Kenneth M. (1978). The Papacy and the Levant (1204–1571), Volume II: The Fifteenth Century. Philadelphia: The American Philosophical Society. ISBN 0-87169-127-2.
- Tiepolo, Maria Francesca (1980). "Appunti su Giovanni Dario" [Notes on Giovanni Dario]. Πεπραγμένα του Δ' Διεθνούς Κρητολογικού Συνεδρίου, Ηράκλειο, 29 Αυγούστου - 3 Δεκεμβρίου 1976. Τόμος Β′ Βυζαντινοί και μέσοι χρόνοι (in Italian). Athens: University of Crete. pp. 501–508.
- Trapp, Erich; Beyer, Hans-Veit; Walther, Rainer; Sturm-Schnabl, Katja; Kislinger, Ewald; Leontiadis, Ioannis; Kaplaneres, Sokrates (1976–1996). Prosopographisches Lexikon der Palaiologenzeit (in German). Vienna: Verlag der Österreichischen Akademie der Wissenschaften. ISBN 3-7001-3003-1.
