= Bartolomeo Minio =

Venetian captain

Bartolomeo Minio was, among other things, a Venetian captain and commander (provveditor e capitanio) of Napoli di Romagna (modern Nafplion, Greece), a Venetian outpost on the Morea (Peloponnese) from 1479 to 1483. His reports (dispacci) to Venice provide a unique historical source for southern Greece in the later 15th century, during the first decades of the Ottoman occupation.

== Family ==
The Minio family records date back to 904 when a Paolo Minio moved to Rialto. In the 14th century, Bartolomeo's family held many office positions and were also counted in the estimo of 1379. Nine members of his family were listed in Karl Hopf's catalogues of governors for Greece and the Aegean islands. Bartolomeo was born in Venice around 1428 to Marco Minio and Cristina Storlado, the youngest of five sons. Cristina died when Bartolomeo was only two years old and Marco remarried in 1431. In 1455, Bartolomeo married Elena Trevisan. Three sons were known to have reached adulthood (Marco, the first son, who was born around 1460, Alvise, born in 1461, and Francesco). The family house can be identified in the San Tomà parish of the San Polo sestiere of Venice.

== Military and political career ==
In 1462, Minio was a consiliere to the rettor of Corfu during his early career in the Stato da Màr, Venice's overseas colonies. Minio spent over forty-two months in Nauplion beginning in November 1479. His term is notable for the fortifications he built for Nauplion, for his settlement of the territorial boundaries with the Ottomans, and for his judicious settlement of the Kladas revolt. In 1499 and 1500, he was stationed in Cyprus where he made notable contributions to the fortifications of Famagusta. Between 1500 and 1502, he was vice-doge (briefly) and captain in Venetian Crete. A collection of 60 reports which he made during that time has survived. These reports, combined with the 90 from Nauplion, form an incomparable collection of letters by a single person. An edition of these letters by Diana G. Wright and John R. Melville-Jones, accompanied by a translation and commentary, has been published (2008) by UniPress, Padua, Italy.

His career in Venice and the mainland followed the normal course for Venetian patricians: in 1497, he was a councillor for water issues in the Terraferma (Venice's possessions on the Italian mainland); in 1503, consiliere and capo of the Council of Ten; podestà at Cremona from 1504 to 1505; in 1506 and 1507, and again in 1510 and 1514, podestà in Padua. In 1509, at the age of 80, he was sent to Julius II in order to discuss matters pertaining to the papal interdict placed on Venice for the capture of Ravenna and Faenza.

He was appointed provveditore of the stratioti for the Ferrara War in 1484. In 1485, he was elected captain of the annual Venetian trading convoy (muda) from Venice to Flanders and England. In the Bay of Biscay, the convoy of four galleys was attacked by pirates, one of whom was Christopher Columbus, the merchandise was taken, and Minio and the survivors left on the coast of Portugal.

Minio had periods of illness prior to his death. After missing vespers on April 25, 1512, he sent a message a week later to the Collegio rejecting his position as vice-doge due to his illness. He was ill again and missed two major ceremonial events in May and June 1513. Despite all this, he became consiliere of Padua in October 1515 after a meeting of the Ten that lasted until the eleventh hour of the day. In August or September 1518, Bartolomeo Minio died at the age of ninety.
