= Palazzo Barbaro Wolkoff =

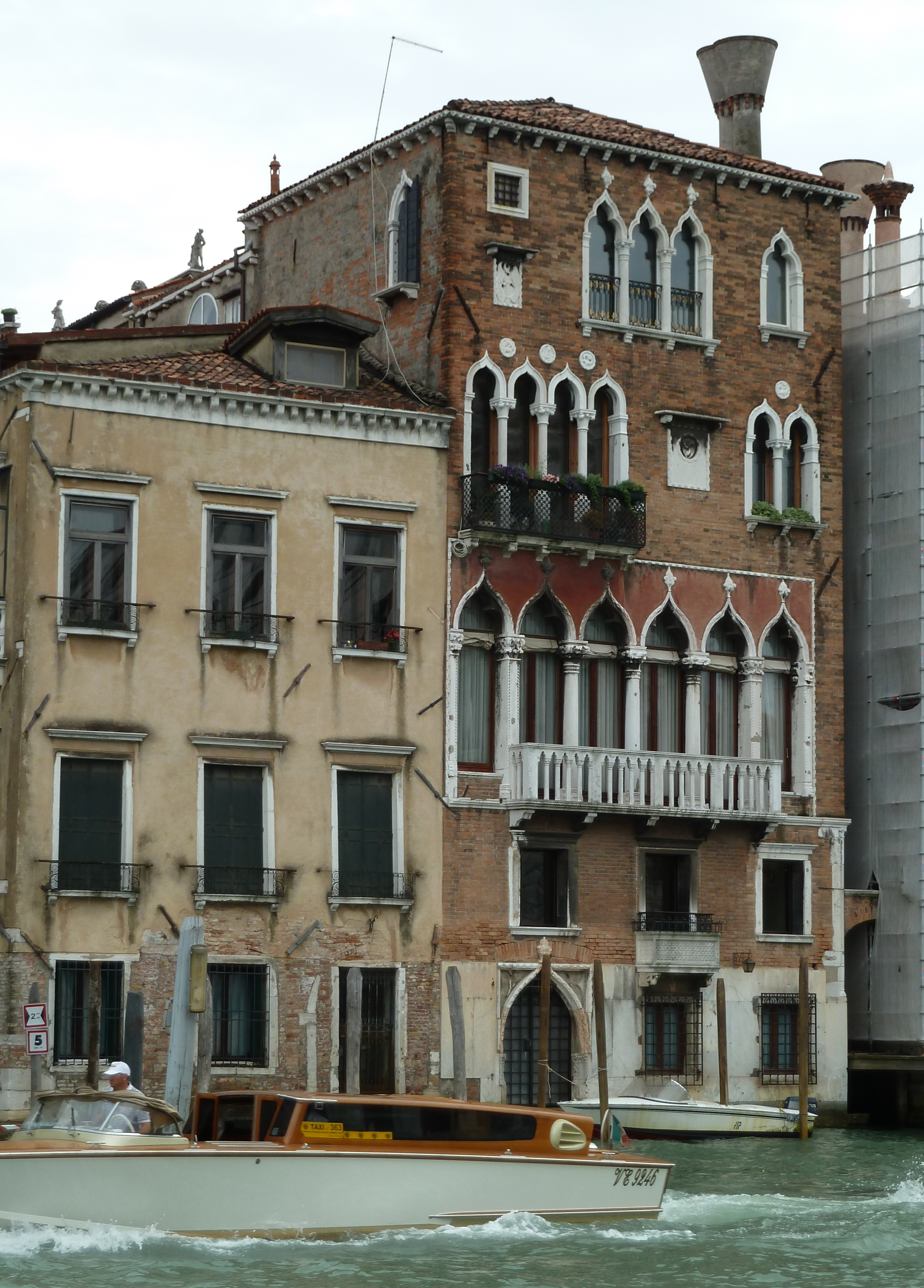
- Palazzo Barbaro Wolkoff (right)
- Interactive map of the Palazzo Barbaro Wolkoff area
- Alternative names: Palazzo Contarini Polignac

General information
- Type: Residential
- Architectural style: Gothic
- Location: Dorsoduro district, Venice, Italy
- Coordinates: 45°25′51″N 12°19′57″E
- Construction stopped: 14th century

Technical details
- Floor count: 5 levels

Palazzo Barbaro Wolkoff is a Venetian civil building located in the Dorsoduro district and overlooking the Grand Canal between Ca' Dario and Casa Salviati.

== History ==
The building, initially built according to the canons of Venetian-Byzantine architecture, was then renovated by adding Gothic elements during the 15th century.

In 1883, it was acquired by Russian watercolor painter (watercolorist), botanist, chemist, and agronomist Alexander Wolkoff (Alexander Wolkoff-Muromtsev). He had lasting relationship with an Italian actress Eleonora Duse. In 1894, as his guest, she lived on the top floor of the building.

== Architecture ==
Made almost entirely of red brick, the highly asymmetrical façade stands out for its extraordinary vertical development and a mix of details: it is divided into the ground floor, mezzanine, main floor, and two upper floors. The arrangement of the decorative elements apparently lacks any order and makes it difficult to analyze the ensemble. The structure is dominated by the polifora of the noble floor, decorated by pointed frames. The top levels have monofora, bifora, trifora, and quadrifora, all placed asymmetrically. Paterae and coats of arms are the modern works.

== Gallery ==
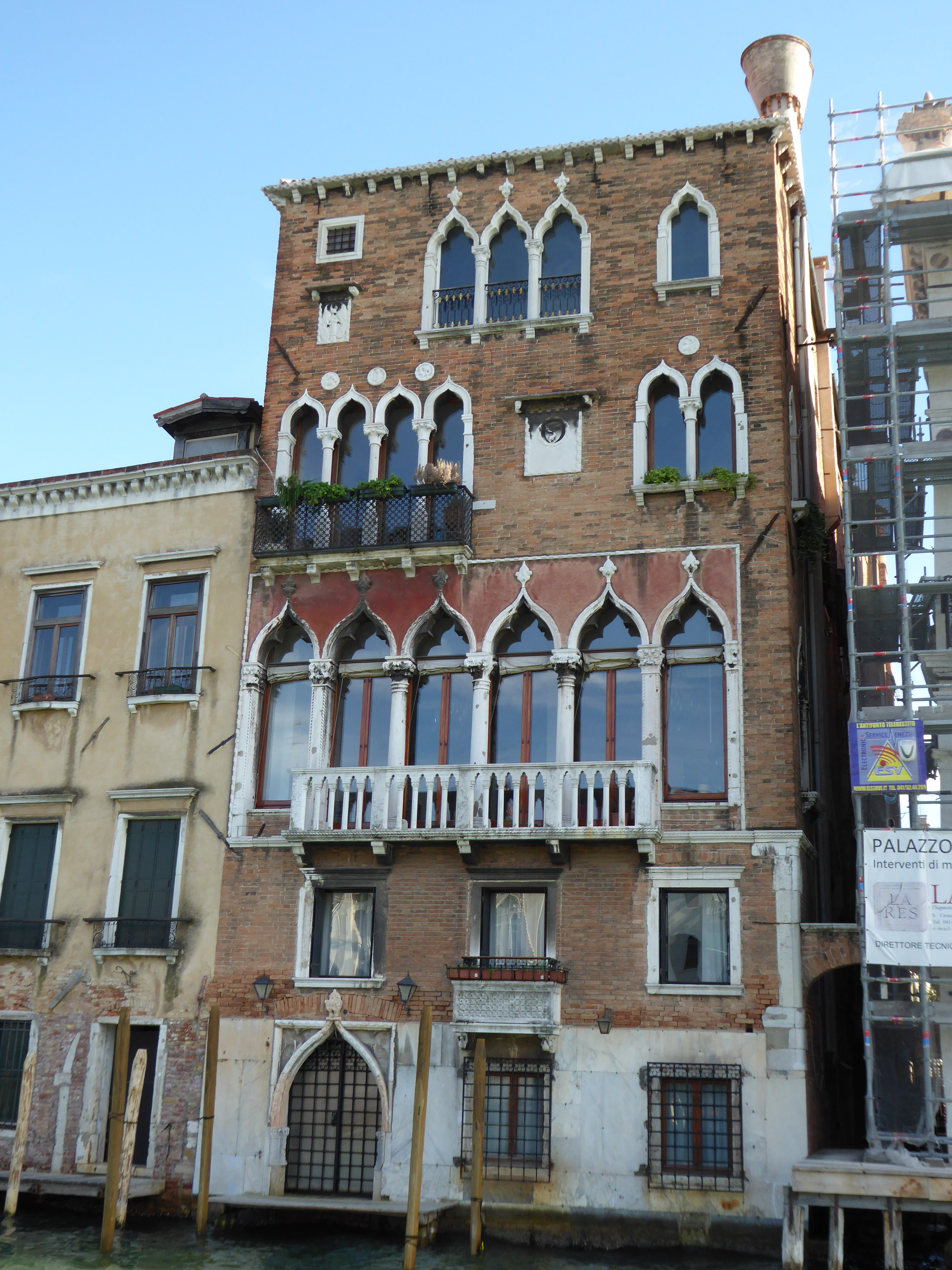
Facade details

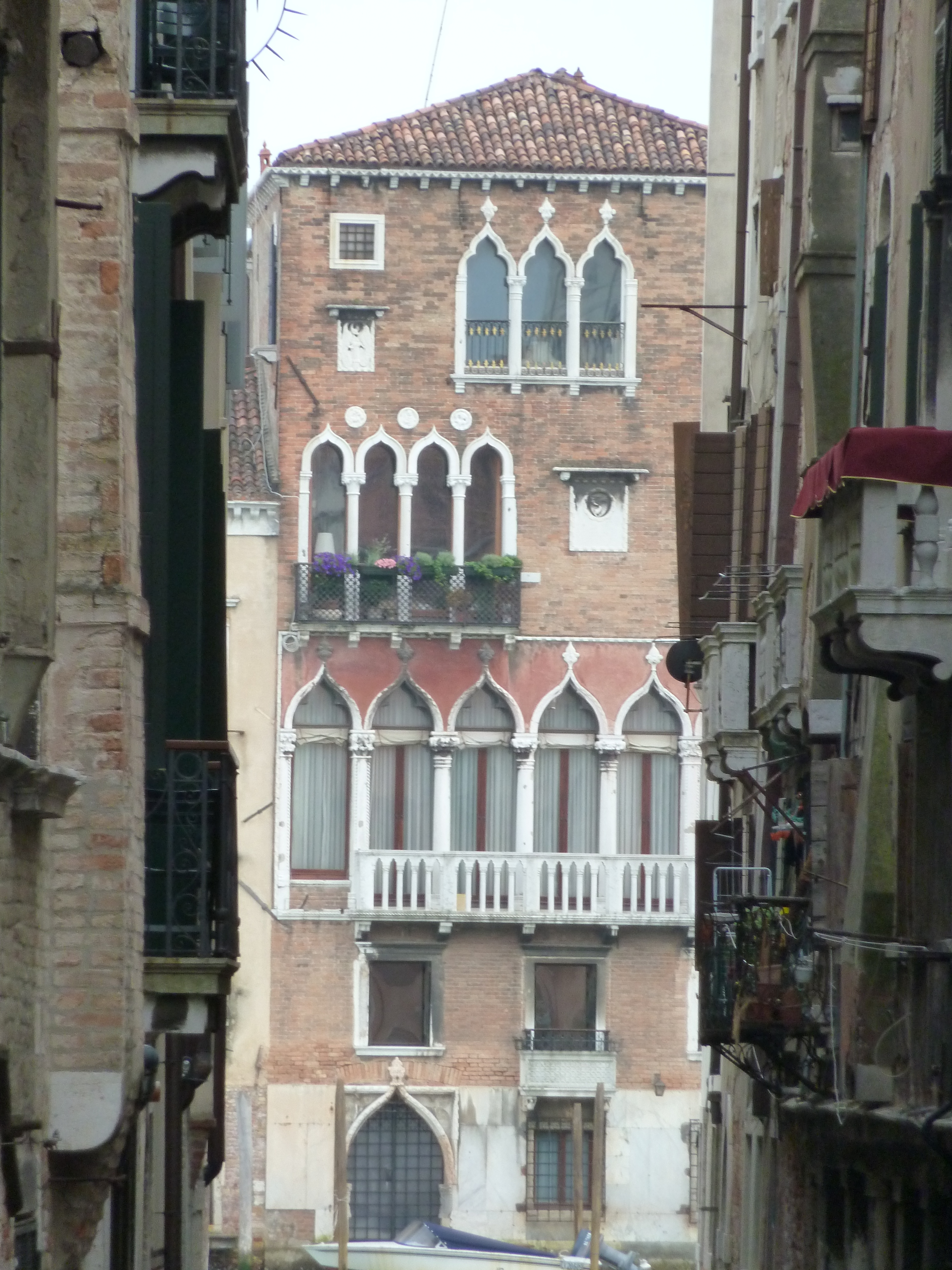
Facade details

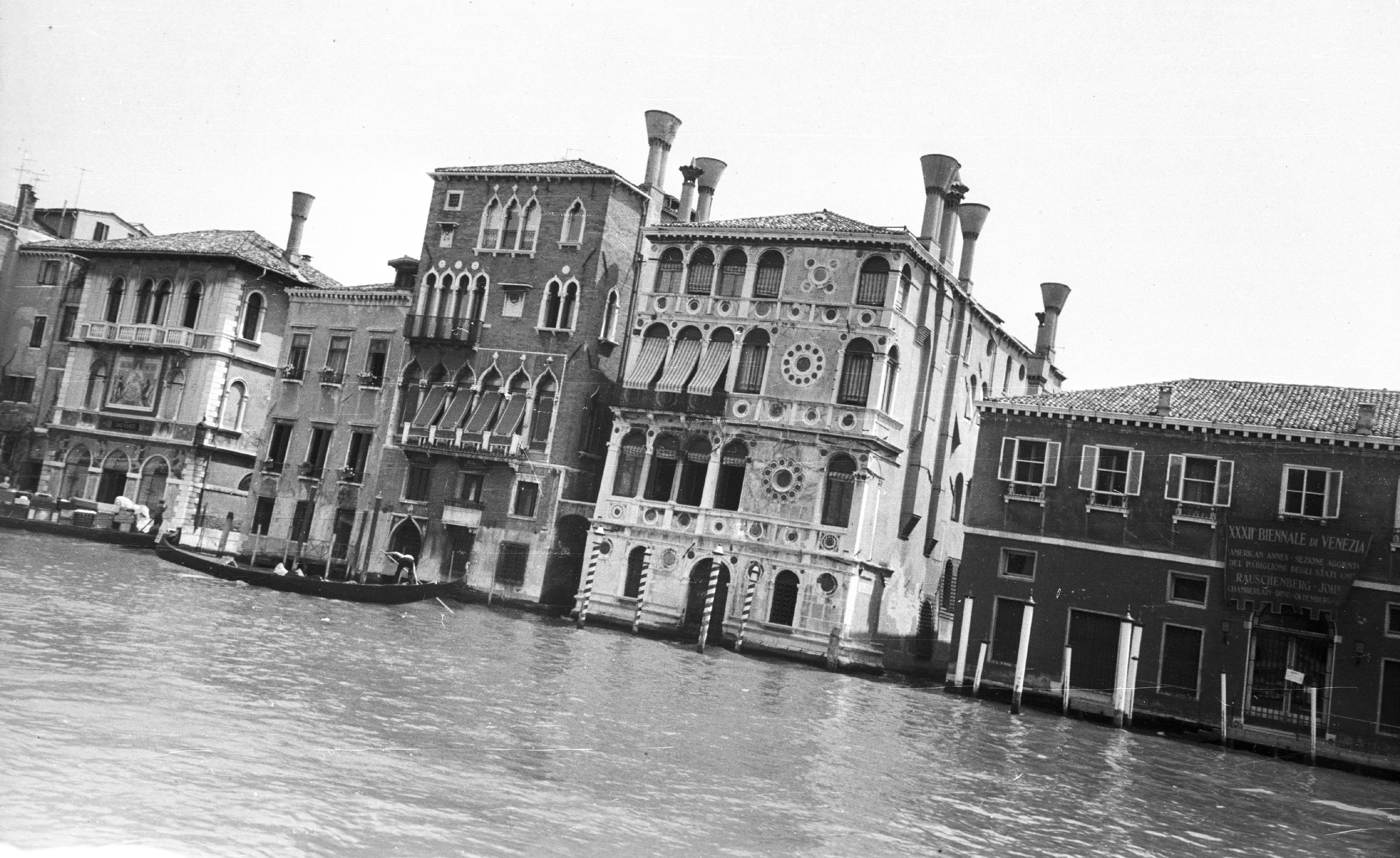
Palazzo Barbaro Wolkoff and Palazzo Dario in 1965.

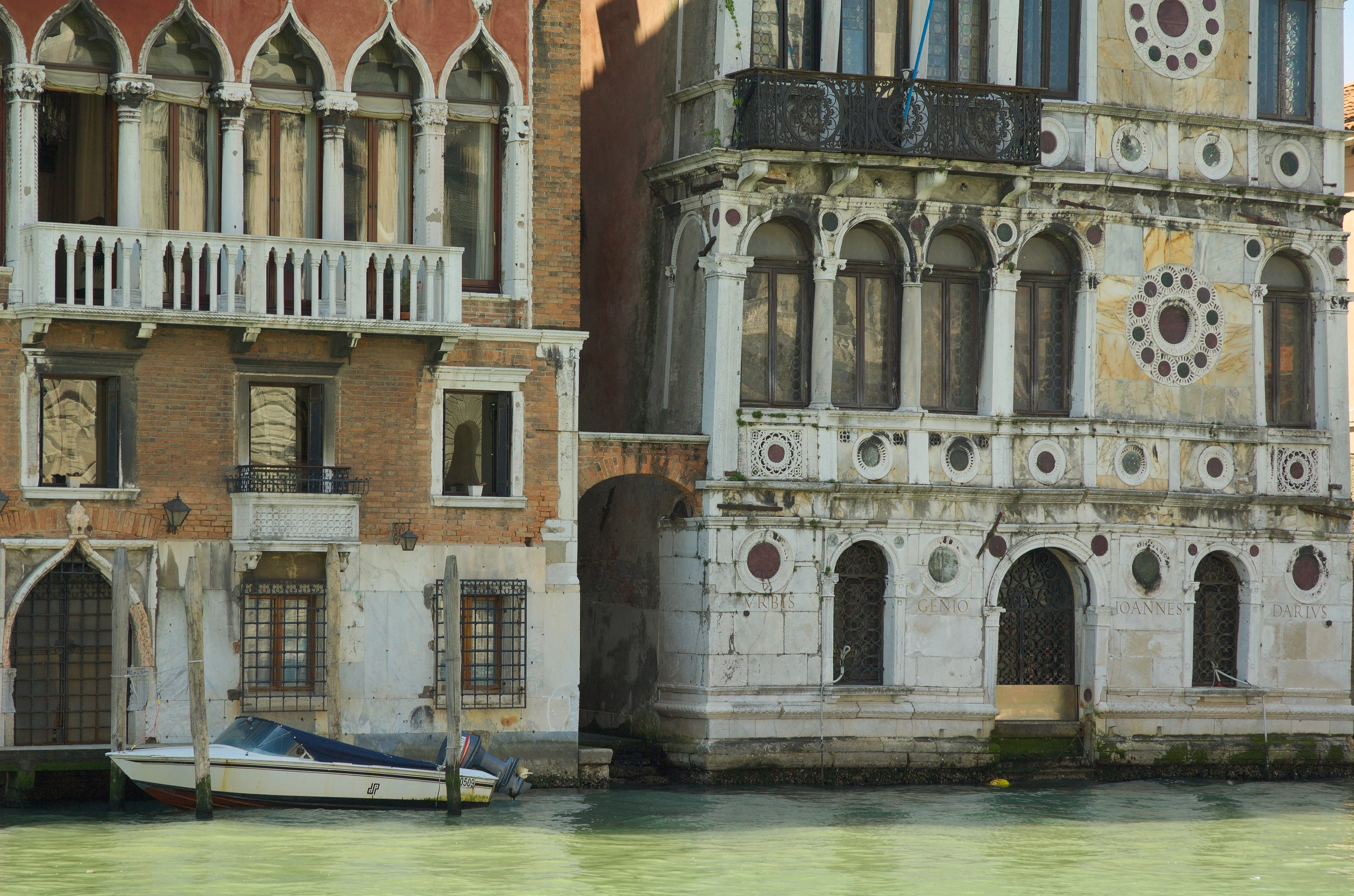
Palazzo Barbaro Wolkoff (left) and Palazzo Dario (right), ground floors.

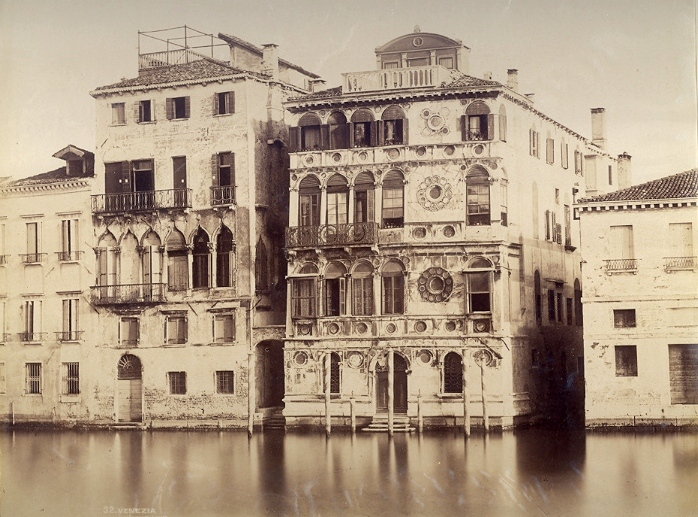
Palazzo Barbaro Wolkoff and Palazzo Dario in 1870s.
