= Theodore Bua =

15th-century Albanian mercenary

Theodor Bua
- Native name: Teodor Bua
- Stradioti: Republic of Venice
- Rank: Captain

Theodor Bua (Albanian: Teodor Bua) was a 15th-century Albanian military commander who served as a captain of the Stradioti regiments of the Republic of Venice.

== Biography ==
After the Venetian-Ottoman peace treaty of 1479, that gave to the Ottomans the last free part of Albania, areas of the Peloponnese, and Dalmatia (Albania Veneta), Teodor Bua defected from the Venetian army and joined the rebellion of Krokodeilos Kladas in the Morea (contemporaneous name for the Peloponnese). In his Dispacci al Senato e ad Altri, Bartolomeo Minio describes an incident in which the Venetian commander of Nafplio sent an Albanian contingent against him and Meksha Buziqi. Still, the soldiers refused to attack them because of their kinship ties and compatriotism. The rebellion ultimately failed after the two commanders broke their alliance. Afterwards, Bua returned to Venetian territory but was jailed in Monemvasia.

== See also ==
- Bua family
