= Treaty of Constantinople (1479) =

1479 treaty between Venice and the Ottoman Empire

- Type: Treaty of peace between the Ottoman Empire and the Republic of Venice
- Signed: 25 January 1479
- Location: Constantinople
- Negotiators: Giovanni Dario (for Venice)
- Signatories: Ottoman Empire; Republic of Venice

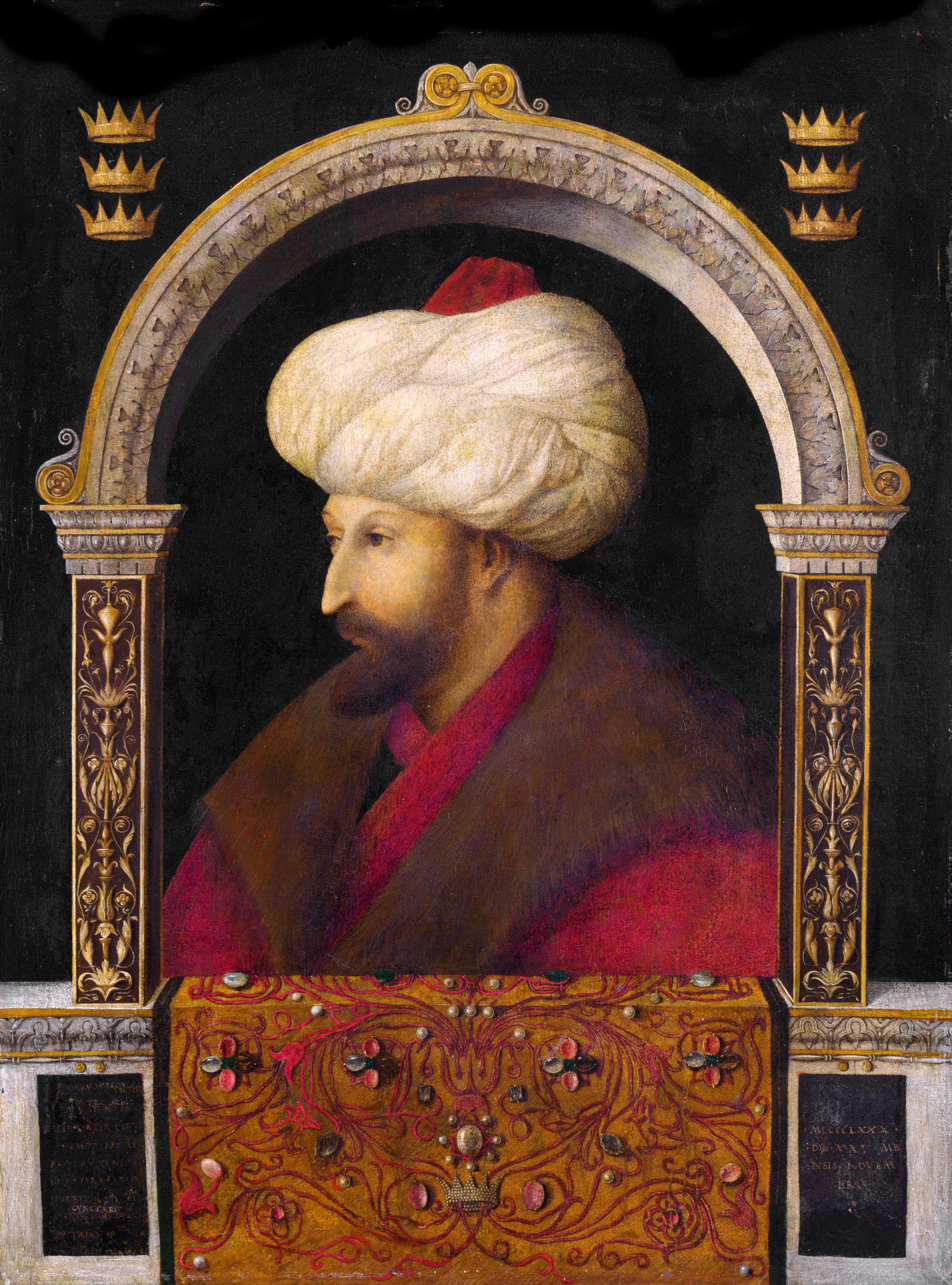
Bellini, Gentile - Sultan Mehmet II

The Treaty of Constantinople was signed on 25 January 1479, which officially ended the sixteen-year-long war between the Republic of Venice and the Ottoman Empire. The Venetians were forced to hand over Scutari (which had been besieged by the Ottomans for many months) in Albania and the island of Lemnos and the Mani Peninsula in Greece; and acknowledge the loss of Negroponte (Euboea) and Croia. The treaty allowed a full restoration of Venetian trading privileges in the Ottoman Empire against an annual flat tax of 10,000 ducats, as well as a 100,000 ducats in arrears owed by Venetian citizens to the Porte.

== Background ==
The Republic of Venice and the Ottoman Empire engaged in a long war since 1463, which had cost Venice dearly in treasure and blood. By 1478, Venice was desperate to end the war, as the Ottomans raided not only the Venetian possessions in the Aegean Sea but even into Friuli, threatening Venice itself. The Venetians were gradually being deprived of any reliable allies as well: the King of Hungary, Matthias Corvinus, who had previously attacked the Ottomans in the Balkans, was embroiled in quarrels with the Holy Roman Emperor, Frederick III. At the same time, the peace in Italy itself—where Venice, Milan and Florence stood opposed to the Papacy and the Kingdom of Naples—was more fragile than ever after the assassination of the Duke of Milan, Galeazzo Maria Sforza, in December 1476, precluding any assistance from the other Italian states. In late 1477 or early 1478, Ferdinand II, King of Aragon and Naples, concluded peace with the Ottomans and even allowed use of Neapolitan harbours by Ottoman warships. As Matthias Corvinus was Ferdinand's son-in-law, the Venetians feared that he might also conclude a similar peace with them. Finally, the death of Uzun Hasan, the Aq Qoyunlu ruler of Persia, in January 1478, removed Venice's hopes for an eastern challenge to the Ottomans.

In this context, a peace offer initiated by the Ottoman sultan Mehmed II in late 1477 was seized upon by the Signoria of Venice, which instructed the fleet commander (provveditore d'armata) Tommaso Malipiero to offer the return of all Ottoman lands captured by Venice, as well as significant concessions: the island of Lemnos, the Mani Peninsula in the southern Morea, the fortress of Croia (Krujë) and its territory in northern Albania, as well as 100,000 ducats still owed as tax arrears by the Venetians Bartolommeo Zorzi and Girolamo Michiel, who had held the license for the production of alum before the outbreak of the war. These terms, however, made clear to Mehmed the Venetians' eagerness to end the conflict, and he increased his demands to include an annual payment of 10,000 ducats and the return to the status quo ante bellum. While Malipiero, whose limited authority did not allow him to exceed his original instructions, left for Venice for consultations on 15 April 1478, the Sultan began preparing another campaign into Albania. After fierce debate, the Venetian Senate accepted the terms on 5 May, and sent Malipiero to convey its decision to Mehmed. The Venetian envoy, carrying rich gifts for the Sultan and his principal viziers, reached the Sultan while the latter was already on the march, but still within the agreed-upon truce; Mehmed nevertheless again refused the terms offered, insisting that Croia was now virtually his, and on the additional surrender of Scutari (Shkodër), Drivasto (Drisht), and Alessio (Lezhë). Malipiero was forced to abandon his mission and return to Venice empty-handed. Croia, already blockaded and hungered out for over a year, surrendered to the Sultan on 15 June; Drivast and Alessio were stormed soon thereafter, but Scutari managed to resist the Ottoman assaults, and was placed under blockade.

Despite the resistance of Scutari, Albania was practically in Ottoman hands, and lack of funds meant that a counterattack by the small forces Venice could muster was unlikely to succeed. Ottoman raiders once again penetrated deep into Friuli, Styria, and Carinthia in the summer of 1478, while an outbreak of the plague in Venice decimated its population. Faced with a hopeless situation, the Venetian government resolved to seek peace at all costs: Giovanni Dario, the secretary of the Senate, was sent to Constantinople with the unprecedented brief to accept all demands made by the Sultan, in exchange for reopening the Levantine trade on which Venice's prosperity depended.

== Terms ==
After long negotiations, on 25 January 1479 Dario concluded a peace treaty with the Sultan. The text of the treaty, written in Greek, survives in the Venetian archives along with a Latin translation. By its terms, Venice undertook to surrender Scutari, Lemnos, and Mani, while at the same time renouncing any claims to Negroponte (Euboea) and Croia, which the Ottomans had already captured during the war. Apart from these concessions, the treaty stipulated a return to the territorial status quo ante, based upon a demarcation to be commonly defined by arbiters appointed by the two sides. All territories seized by either side beyond that line by Venice were to be returned within two months, although the Venetians were given permission to withdraw their troops, weapons, and stores of war from them; likewise, the Ottomans would return lands they had captured in the Morea, Albania, and Dalmatia.

In exchange, against an annual payment of 10,000 ducats, the Republic again received the right to trade freely and without taxation in the Ottoman Empire, and maintain a trade colony in Constantinople under its own official (bailo), who would have civil authority over all Venetians resident in the Ottoman Empire. Venice also undertook to pay 100,000 ducats within two years, to cover most of the alum tax arrears. The annual Venetian payment of 10,000 ducats was abolished by Mehmed's successor, Bayezid II, in 1482.

== Aftermath ==
The Sultan dismissed Dario with many honours, including three gold-cloth kaftans; at Dario's request the Venetian provveditore of Croia, Pietro Vetturi, was released and became the new bailo at Constantinople. Dario returned to Venice, accompanied by an Ottoman envoy, Lütfi Bey, on 16 April 1479, to oversee the treaty's ratification. The exotic dress of the Ottoman delegation as well as the arrogant behaviour of its head were the object of comment and fascination. Dario was likewise entrusted with overseeing the implementation of the treaty, specifically the return of Venetian fortresses and territories captured by the Ottomans during the war, a process which was not completed until 1480, as well as the release of Venetian prisoners; as many of the latter had been sold into slavery, only a few were ever actually returned.

News of the agreement reached Scutari on 25 April, whereupon the defenders were given the choice to remain or emigrate; all of the surviving inhabitants chose the latter, and under the provveditore Antonio da Lezze departed on Venetian ships for Venice, where they were received with honours by the Venetian government. The Venetians offered to resettle them in Cyprus, but the refugees refused, and ended up in the border town of Gradisca instead. The surrender of Scutari cemented Ottoman control over Albania, and all that was left of the Venetian possessions in the area was a small coastal strip. Along with the Ottoman capture of Zakynthos and Cephalonia in 1480, these developments posed a direct threat to Venice's control of the Adriatic Sea. Within Albania, the noble families that had led the resistance against the Ottomans for decades, were either obliged to seek exile in Italy or accommodate themselves with the Ottomans, often converting to Islam. In the Morea, the delineation of the Venetian and Ottoman possessions proved acrimonious, while decision to surrender the Mani Peninsula was opposed by the local Greek and Albanian chieftains who had fought for Venice: Krokodeilos Kladas and Theodore Bua launched an uprising against the Ottomans, but it failed after the two leaders fell out among themselves.

The treaty was roundly condemned in European courts and public opinion, and the Venetians along with them, for having given in to the harsh Ottoman terms. However, according to the Ottomanist Franz Babinger, the treaty, and the effective abandonment of Venice by the rest of Christendom, was a watershed moment in the relations of the Christian European powers with the Ottomans. Until that time, the Ottomans were considered "the mortal enemy of the Christian name", but the treaty opened the way for an approach guided less by religious principles, and more by "particularist worldly aims", where the European powers sought relations with the Ottomans to achieve political advantages in their own rivalries and conflicts.

== See also ==
- List of treaties
- Ottoman–Venetian wars

== Sources ==
- Babinger, Franz (1992) [1978]. Mehmed the Conqueror and His Time. Bollingen Series 96. Translated from the German by Ralph Manheim. Edited, with a preface, by William C. Hickman. Princeton, New Jersey: Princeton University Press. ISBN 0-691-09900-6.
- Miklosich, Franz; Μüller, Joseph (1865). Acta et Diplomata graeca medii aevi sacra et profana. Vol. III. Vienna: Carl Gerold. pp. 293–298.
- Setton, Kenneth M. (1978). The Papacy and the Levant (1204–1571), Volume II: The Fifteenth Century. Vol. 2. Philadelphia: The American Philosophical Society. ISBN 0-87169-127-2.
