= Palazzo Dario =

Palace in Venice, Italy

Coordinates: 45°25′51″N 12°19′56″E

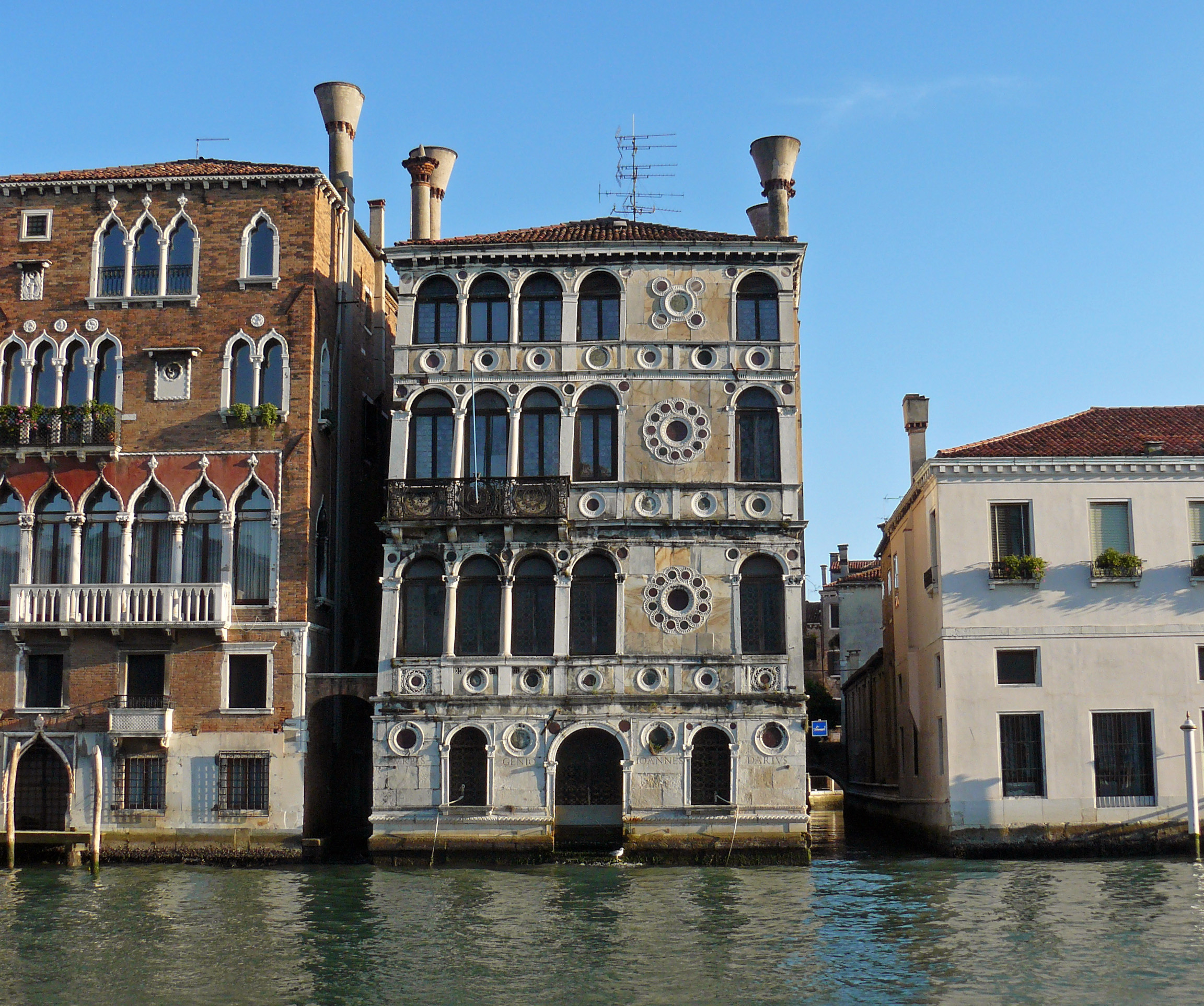
The Palazzo Dario (centre) on the bank on the Grand Canal. To the left is the Gothic-style Palazzo Barbaro Wolkoff.

The Palazzo Dario, known as Ca' Dario, is a palace located between the Palazzo Barbaro Wolkoff and the narrow Rio delle Torreselle on the Grand Canal in the sestiere of Dorsoduro, of the city of Venice, Italy. The palace was built in the Venetian Gothic style and was renovated in Renaissance style.

== History ==
The palace was remodelled after 1486 by a follower of Pietro Lombardo for the patrician Giovanni Dario, Secretary to the Venetian Senate, diplomat, and merchant. After Dario's death in 1494, it passed to his daughter, Marietta, who was married to Vincenzo Barbaro, the son of Giacomo Barbaro and owner of the neighboring Palazzo Barbaro Wolkoff. Marietta's sons received possession of the house in 1522. Before that time, the Senate rented it on occasion as a residence for Turkish diplomats.

The land-side of Palazzo Dario rises on a small square shaded by trees, the Campiello Barbaro, named in honor of the patrician Barbaro family who lived there. The English art critic John Ruskin was particularly entranced with and wrote about the palace's Gothic marble-encrusted oculi. The corner treatments of the palace resemble those found in the Palazzo Priuli a San Severo. The rear facade of the palace on the Campiello Barbaro has Gothic arches of the fifth order.

A large project of renovation was undertaken at the end of the 19th century, when the palace belonged to the Countess de la Baume-Pluvinel, a French aristocrat and writer under the name of "Laurent Evrard". She was pleased to surround herself with French and Venetian writers, one of whom, Henri de Régnier, is commemorated by an inscription on the garden wall, saying "In questa casa antica dei Dario, Henri de Regnier—poeta di Francia—venezianamente visse e scrisse—anni 1899–1901". The Countess is responsible for the staircase, the external chimneys, the majolica stoves, and the fine carvings (vaguely reminiscent of the Scuola di San Rocco) in the dining room on the second piano nobile, looking down to the garden, as well as a great deal of stabilization and replacement of marble on the facade.

In 1908 the painter Claude Monet created impressionist depictions of Palazzo Dario, including canvases at the Art Institute of Chicago and the National Museum of Art of Wales.

In 2025 the palace, empty, and mostly derelict until freshly renovated, sometimes referred to as "Venice's cursed palace" after the deaths, sometimes violent, of at least seven owners and guests, was seeking a buyer at an asking price thought to be €20,000,000.

== Gallery ==
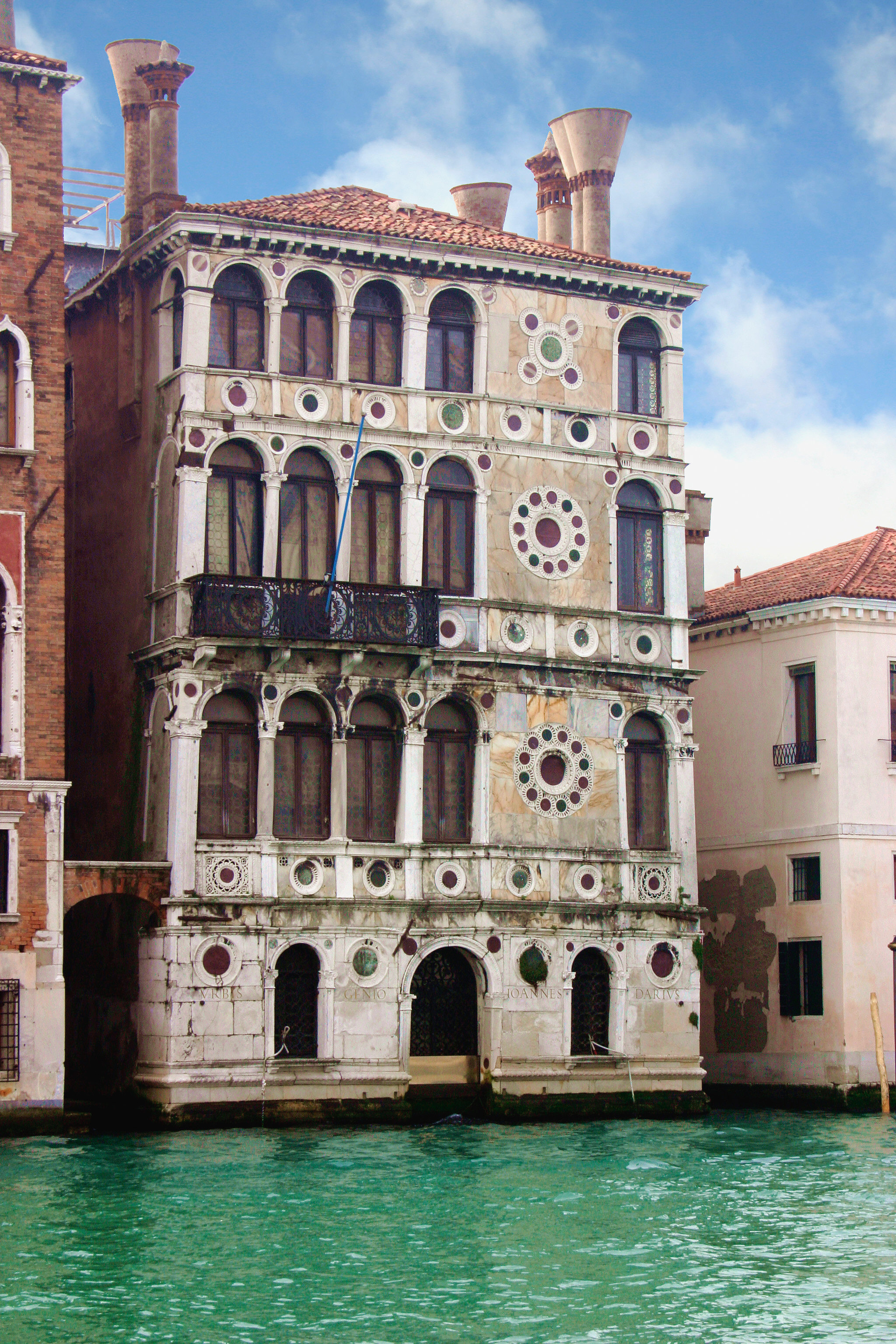
Palazzo Dario in 2004

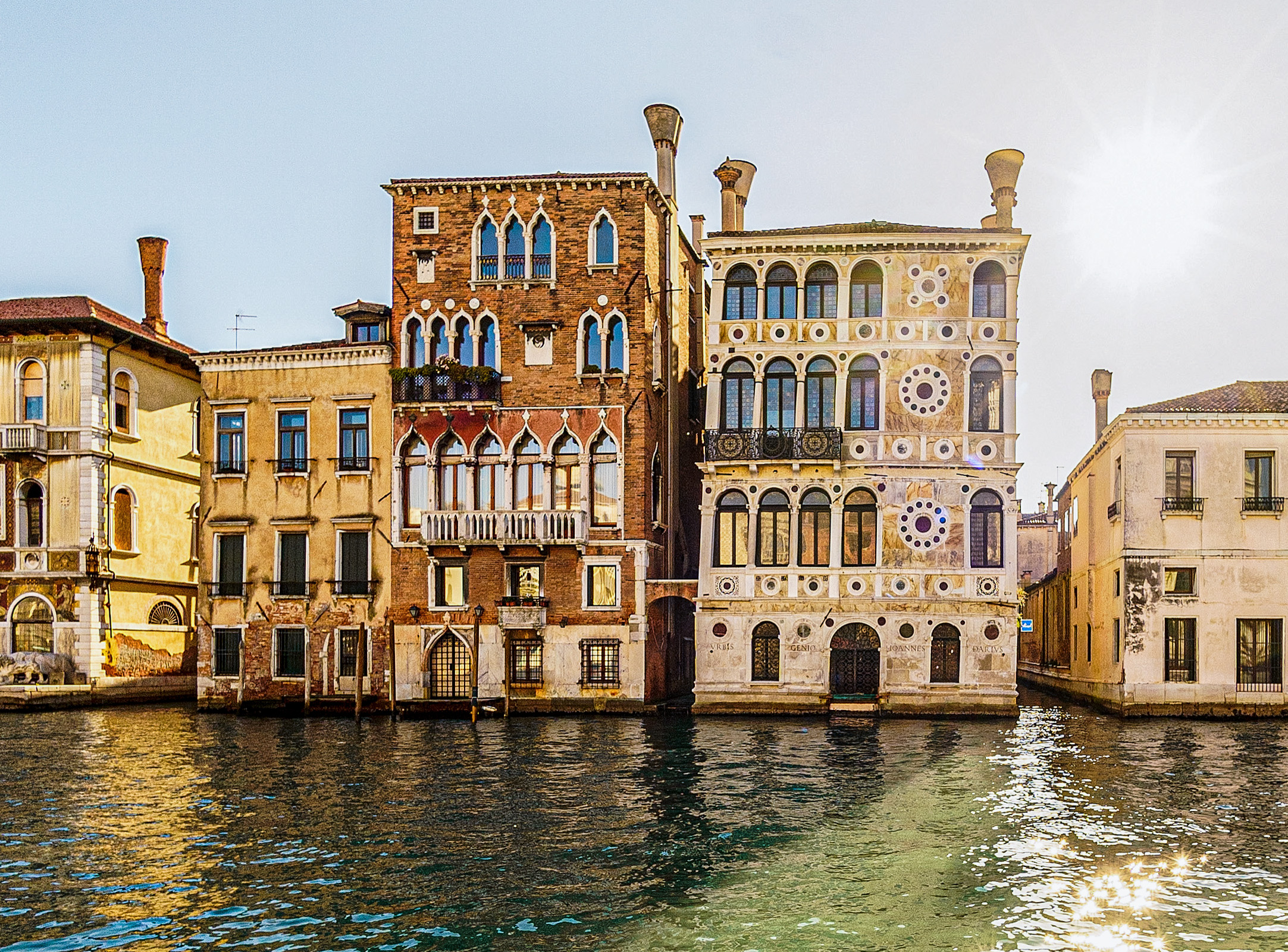
Palazzo Barbaro Wolkoff and Palazzo Dario

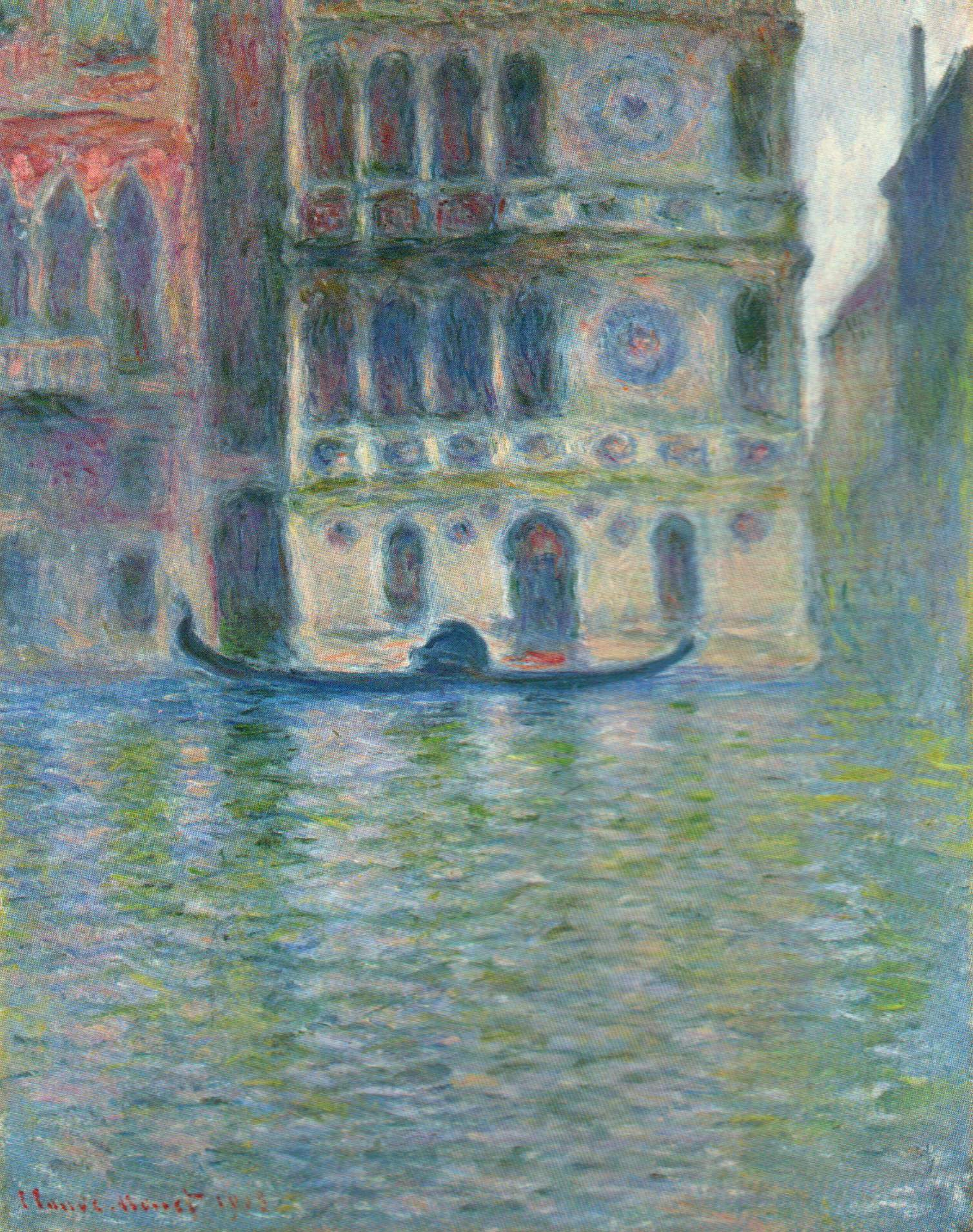
Palazzo Dario (1908) by Claude Monet

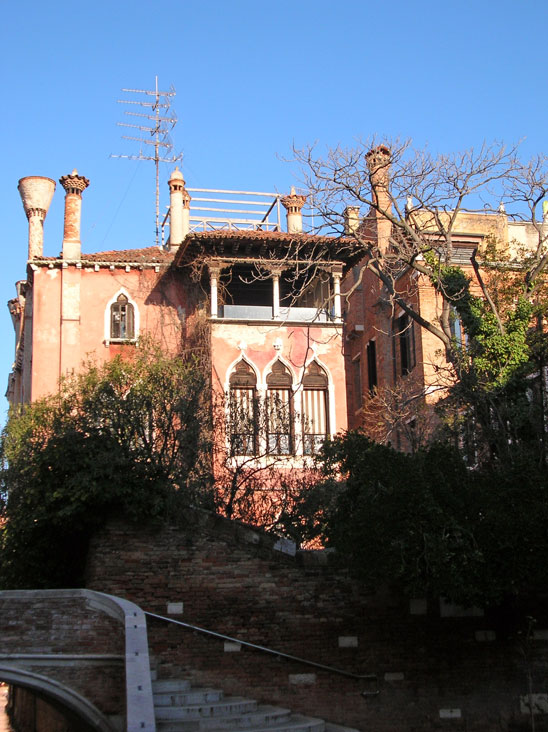
Land-side facade

== See also ==
- Kit Lambert, producer and manager of The Who, who owned the Palazzo in the early 1970s.

== Sources ==
- Dario Palace. Venice. JC-R Net retrieved 3 October 2007
- Norwich, John Julius (1989). A History of Venice. New York, Vintage Books ISBN 0-679-72197-5
- Buckley, Jonathan. "The Rough Guide to Venice & the Veneto" retrieved 3 October 2007
- Tiepolo, Maria Francesca. 2002. "I Greci nella Cancelleria veneziana: Giovanni Dario", I Greci a Venezia: Atti del convegno internazionale di studio, 5–7 November 1998. Venice. 257–314.
