= Krokodeilos Kladas =

Byzantine military leader from the Peloponnese

Krokodeilos Kladas (Greek: Κροκόδειλος Κλαδάς; 1425–1490), also known as Korkodeilos, Krokondeilos, or Korkondelos, was a Byzantine military leader from the Peloponnese who fought against the Ottomans on behalf of the Republic of Venice in the late 15th century.

Flag of Kladas.

== Biography ==
Krokodeilos Kladas was born in Koroni in 1425. His father was the military chief Theodore Kladas.

In 1460, Ottoman forces under Sultan Mehmed II (r. 1444–1446 and 1451–1481) took the Peloponnese from the Byzantine-aligned Despotate of the Morea. Kladas handed over his castle of Saint George (Agios Giorgios) to the Ottomans; the Ottomans gave him the castle of Vardounia on the Mani peninsula, and the territory of Elos.

By 1465, Krokodeilos Kladas and his brother Epifani were leading bands of warriors called stratioti on behalf of the Republic of Venice, then engaged in a war against the Turks. They secured Vardounia as a Venetian possession; Epifani was appointed governor. Venetian officials favored the Kladas brothers and supplied them with generous gifts. The 1479 peace settlement returned territorial boundaries in Morea to the status quo ante bellum of 1463, which put the Venetian–Kladas landholdings back into Ottoman possession. Kladas moved to Venetian-held Koroni, having been granted a pardon for himself and his followers by Ottoman authorities in the peace treaty.

On 9 October 1480, Kladas led stratioti from Koroni to attack Ottoman holdings in Mani. The Ottomans blamed Venice for Kladas's insurgency. Venice sought to avoid another costly Ottoman war but could not curtail Kladas. Both the Ottomans and the Venetians put a bounty on Kladas. This revolt was joined in December by stratioti from Nafplion led by Theodore Bua and Mexas Bozikis.

In February 1481, the rebels defeated an Ottoman force between Passavas and Oitylo. Later that month, a larger force under Mohammed Bey drove Kladas to Porto Kagio. Kladas fled on a Neapolitan ship; the revolt withered in his absence and was quelled without further bloodshed. Having joined the Neapolitan army, Kladas traveled to Albania to aid an anti-Ottoman revolt; it is not known when he returned to Mani. The Ottomans captured him in battle near Monemvasia in 1490 and executed him; some reports claim that he was flayed alive.

He and his brothers are strongly praised in Venetian sources. Kladas had been awarded a Venetian knighthood (and a gold robe) just before the 1480 revolt. Members of the family moved to Kefalonia and continued to lead stratioti in Venetian service for at least another hundred years.

A 15th-century Byzantine report names a "Krokodeilos" as one of the rebels against Emperor Manuel II Palaiologos in 1415. The "crocodile" pun made there is a single instance and does not appear in contemporaneous documents relating to Krokodeilos Kladas. A carved inscription reading "Krokontēlos" in a church in Karytaina is probably not related to him; the inscription is dated to the mid-14th century.

== Family ==
The first attestation of the Kladas family in the Morea (the historical Peloponnese) dates to 1296, in an account of the capture of a "Frankish"-held castle for the Byzantines. It has been proposed that the family may have emigrated from Epirus, but this isn't based on any evidence.

Recent research shows that Kladas was likely a Byzantine family of turcopole (mercenary) origin. The Kladas can be traced back to descendants of Kaykaus II, a Sultan of Rum deposed in 1262, who served as mercenaries (turcopoles) in the troops of Michael VIII and Andronikos II Palaiologos. The family migrated to the Peloponnese in 1263, part of the army of the court official Constantine Palaiologos, in order to face the crusader-controlled Principality of Achaea in the war of 1263–1264.

After the war, the Kladas received lands and were fully integrated in the Byzantine society of the Morean Despotate, through alliances and marriages made with local archontes; the family eventually gained possession of extensive pieces of land with paroikoi. They maintained close ties with the Republic of Venice.

Members of the Kladas family made donations to a monastery at Mystras in 1366 and 1375.
