= Palazzo Priuli Bon =

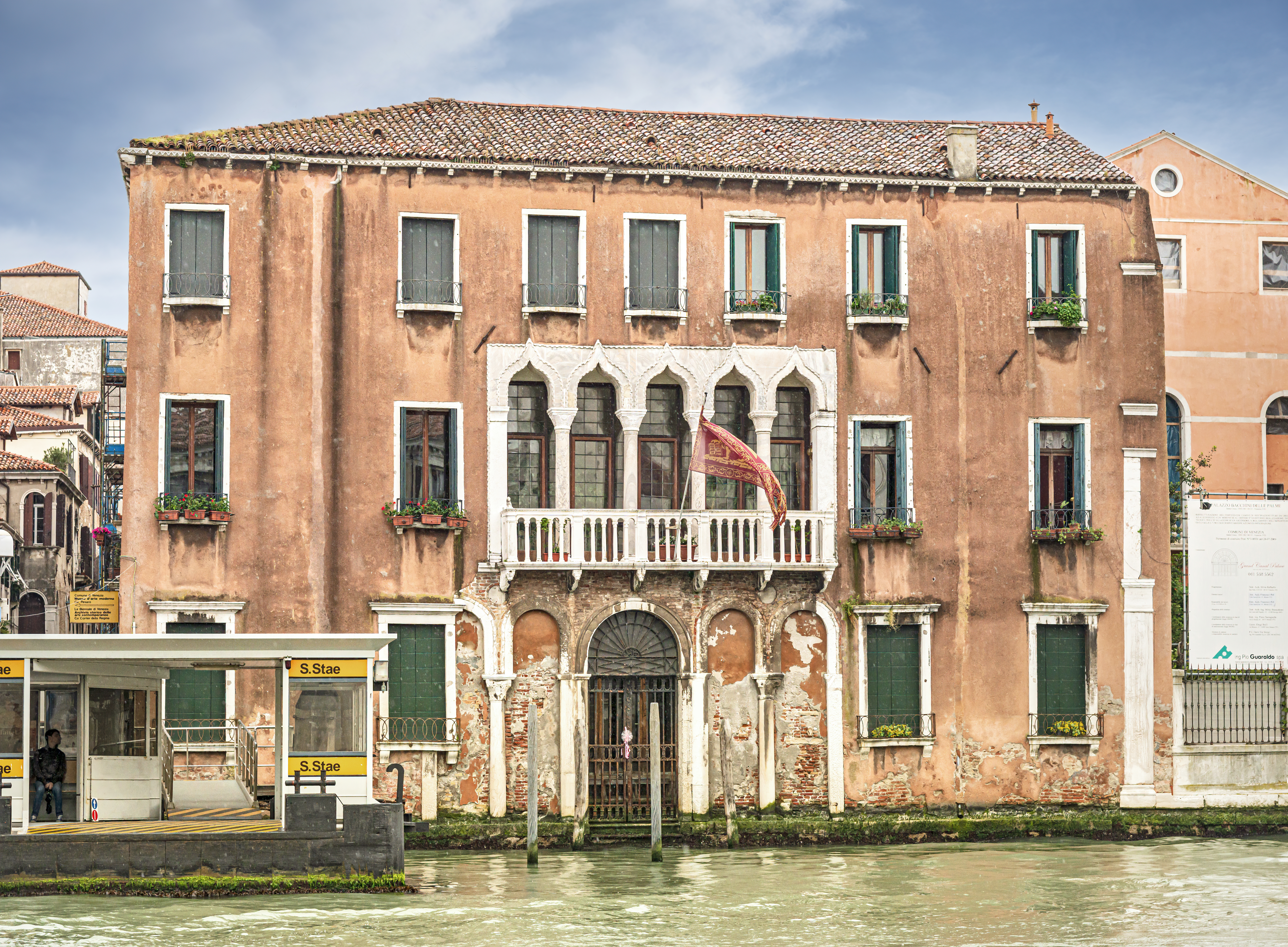
Facade with roofline of San Stae behind.

Palazzo Priuli Bon is a Gothic-style palace on the Canal Grande, located between the Palazzo Duodo and the Campo of San Stae, in the sestiere of Santa Croce, in Venice, Italy.

The palace was built towards the end of the fourteenth century for Lunardo Priuli, who died in 1543. Later on it belonged to the Bon family (formerly of San Canciano). The last of the family with this surname, Lorenzo Bon, died in 1792. In 1796, the members of the Dandolo family resided here. The palace is now used for exhibitions.

Due to the high price of land in Venice, patrician palaces tended to expand upwards rather than outwards, and this palace is a good example. The water storey shows the original Veneto-Byzantine semicircular arches, while the storey above it shows the ogee arches from the later Gothic restructuring.

Details of the facade. Photos by Paolo Monti, 1969

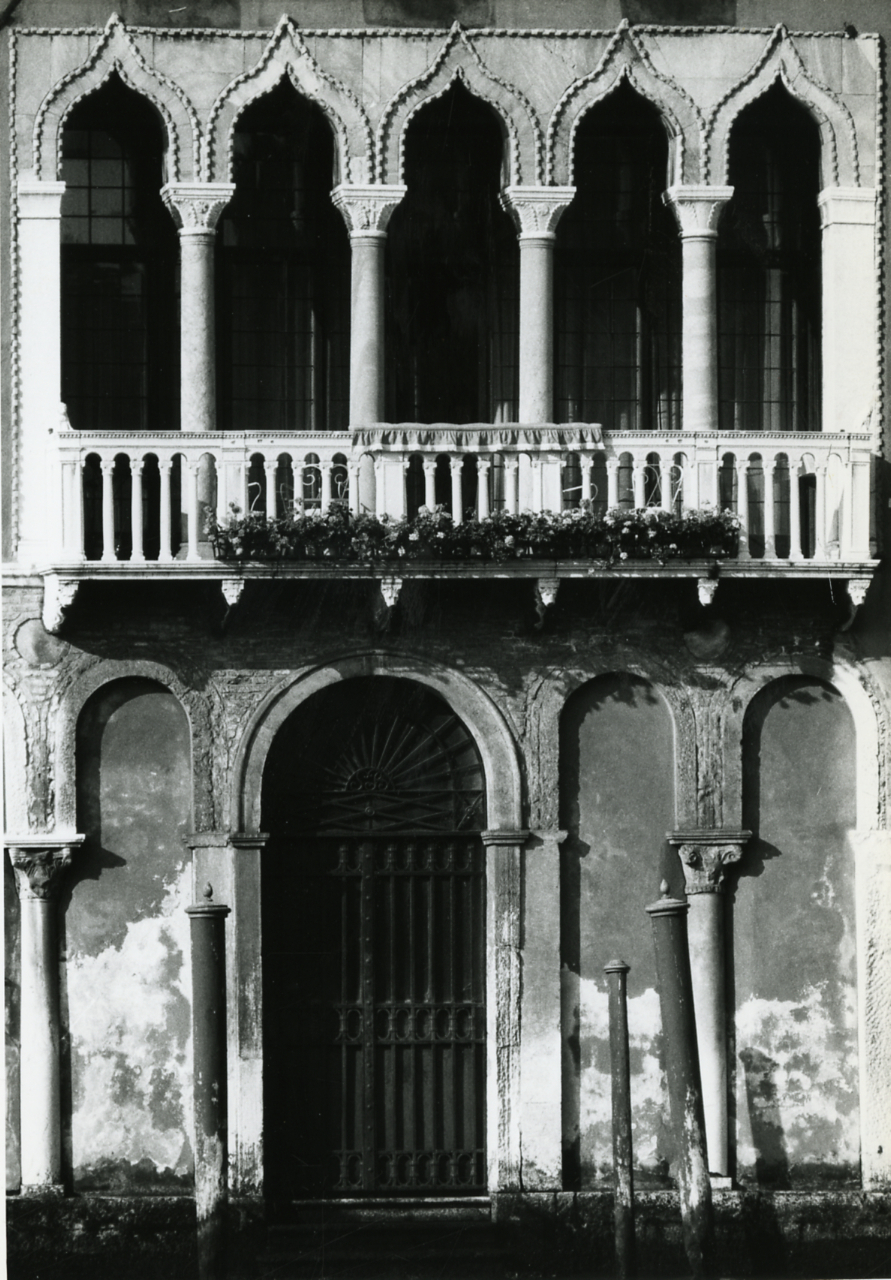
Main section

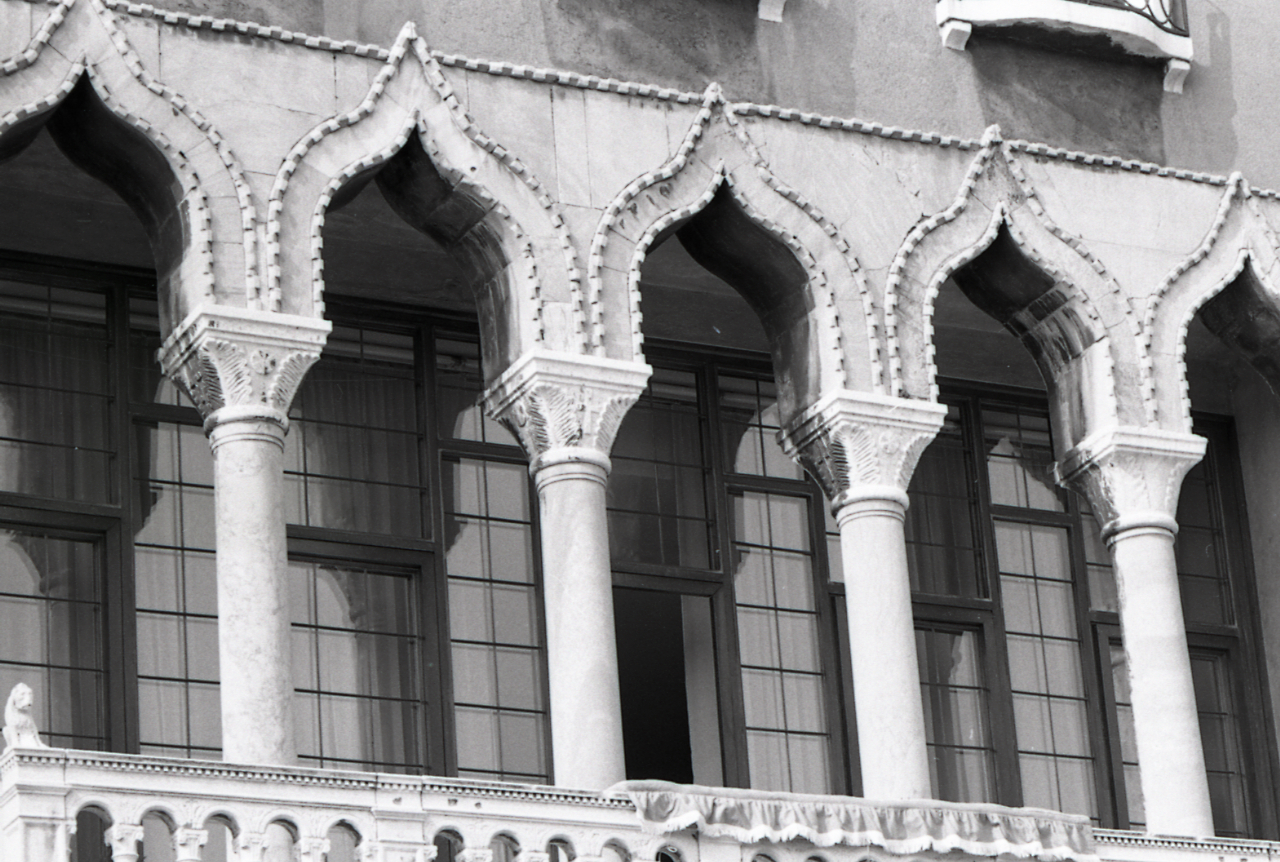
Window
