= Ca' Tron =

Palace in Venice, Italy

Coordinates: 45°26′31″N 12°19′48″E

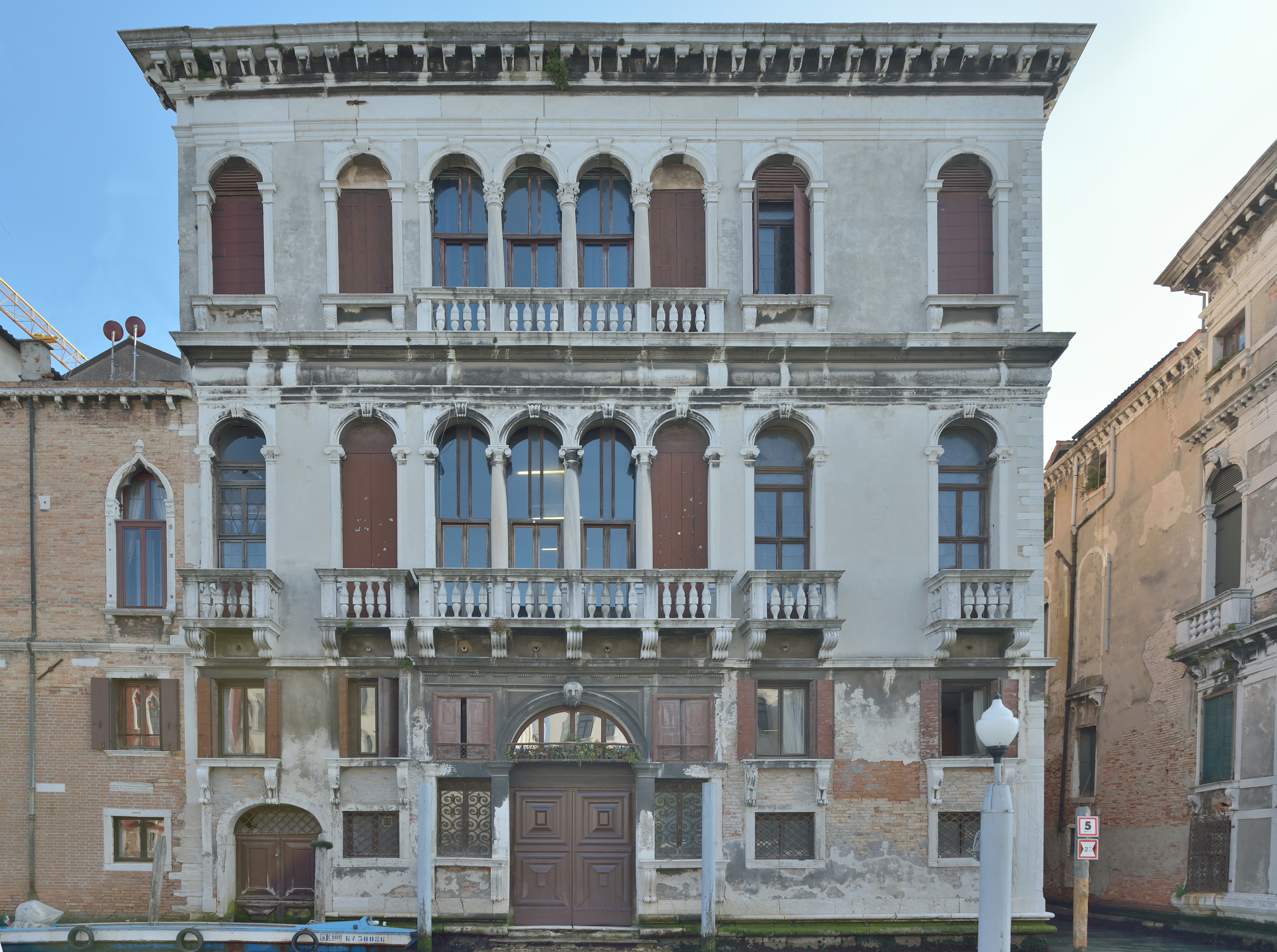
Ca' Tron, with Palazzo Duodo on the left.

Ca' Tron is a palace in Venice, northern Italy, facing the Canal Grande. Part of the sestiere (quarter) of Santa Croce, it is situated between the Palazzo Belloni Battagia and Palazzo Duodo, near the church of San Stae. It is owned by the Università Iuav di Venezia and houses the Department of Design and Planning in Complex Environments.

The palace was rebuilt in the late 16th century to the design of an unknown architect influenced by Jacopo Sansovino as the residence of the Tron family, who lived here until their extinction in the 19th century. The Tron had lived in this parish from the time of the start of the Patriciate. The family produced one Doge, Niccolo Tron in 1471, and nearly a half dozen procurators, and many other Venetian statesmen and generals. Maximilian, Elector of Bavaria, stayed here in 1684; and in 1775 Andrea Tron entertained the Emperor Joseph II with a magnificent ball. Senator Francesco Tron, grandson of Andrea, died here in 1793. In the 19th century the palace nearly fell into ruin.

It has been owned by the Università Iuav di Venezia since 1972.

== Description ==
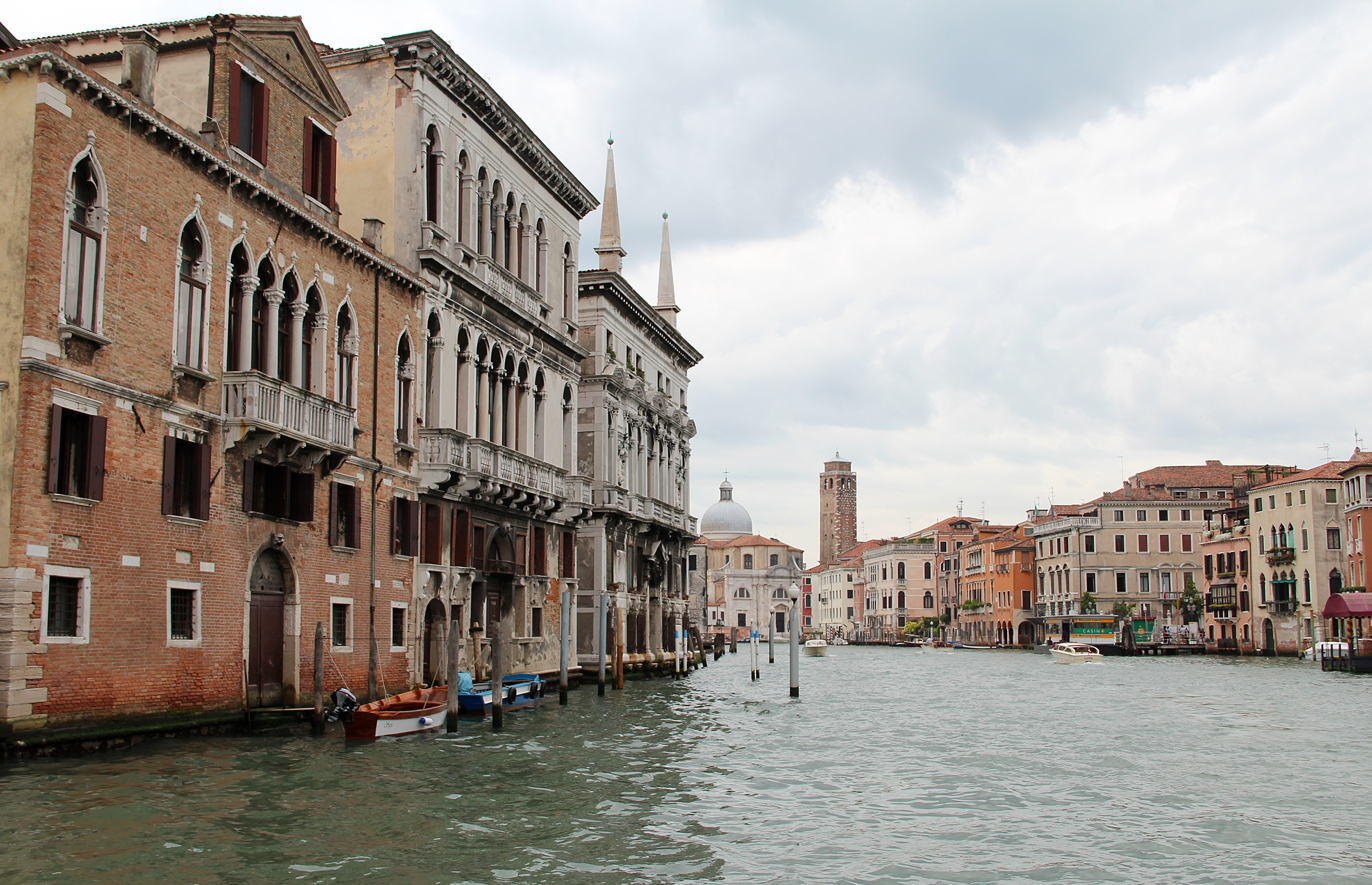
Ca’Tron built in the sestiere of Santa Croce on the right bank of the Canal Grande in Venice.

The building is an L-shaped plan, with a ground floor, a mezzanine and two piani nobili. The latter, differently from the others, have a façade in Istrian stone. The left side of the façade is shorter, and thus the portal and the central openings of the floors are asymmetrically placed.

The floors have eight windows, the four central ones joined to form a quadruple mullioned window. The small rear façade, which faces a small garden with a well at the center, features two quintuple mullioned windows with parapets in correspondence of the piani nobili, while at the ground floor there is a single opening divided by two columns.

The interior has somewhat dilapidated frescoes by Louis Dorigny, a Diana and Endymion by Jacopo Guarana, and stucco decorations.

== Sources ==
- Brusegan, Marcello (2005). La grande guida dei monumenti di Venezia. Rome: Newton & Compton. ISBN 88-541-0475-2.
