= Palazzo Belloni Battagia =

Building in Venice, Italy

Coordinates: 45°26′31″N 12°19′46″E

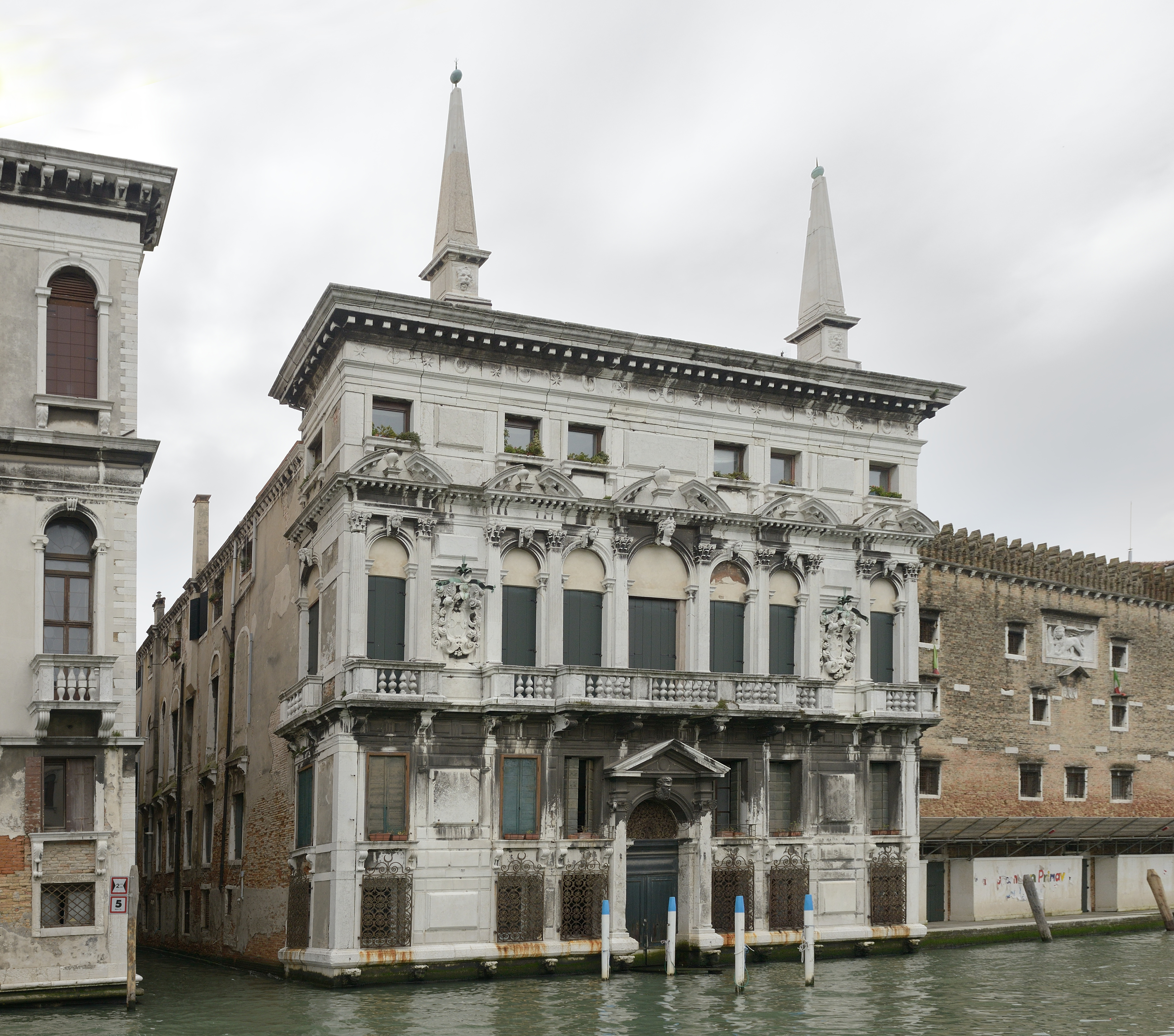
Palazzo Belloni Battagia.

Palazzo Belloni Battagia (also spelled Palazzo Belloni Battaglia) is a palace on the Canal Grande, Venice, northern Italy. It is located in the sestiere (district) of Santa Croce, between the Fondaco del Megio and Ca' Tron, near the church of San Stae.

It was built in the mid-17th century, possibly to a design by Baldassarre Longhena, as the residence of the Belloni family.

== Description ==
It has two floors and a mezzanine, with a typically Baroque façade featuring a rich sculpture decoration.

The ground floor, surmounted by a parapet, has at the middle a big portal with a tympanum. The piano nobile has seven rectangular windows within a large set of decorations, including false columns, two large coat of arms and, above each window, a broken entablature.

The mezzanine, separated by the floor below by a frame, has six small windows. The cornice has a notched frame and a long frieze with the Belloni coat of arms. At the top are two symmetrical, obelisk-shaped pinnacles: this theme is featured in a minority of palaces in Venice, such as Palazzo Giustinian Lolin, also designed by Longhena, and Palazzo Papadopoli.

Internally, there are 19th-century frescoes in the piano nobile and a private oratory with painted decorations.

== Bibliography ==
- Brusegan, Marcello (2005). La grande guida dei monumenti di Venezia. Rome: Newton & Compton. ISBN 88-541-0475-2.
