= Palazzo Duodo =

Building in Venice, Italy

Coordinates: 45°26′30.44″N 12°19′48.32″E

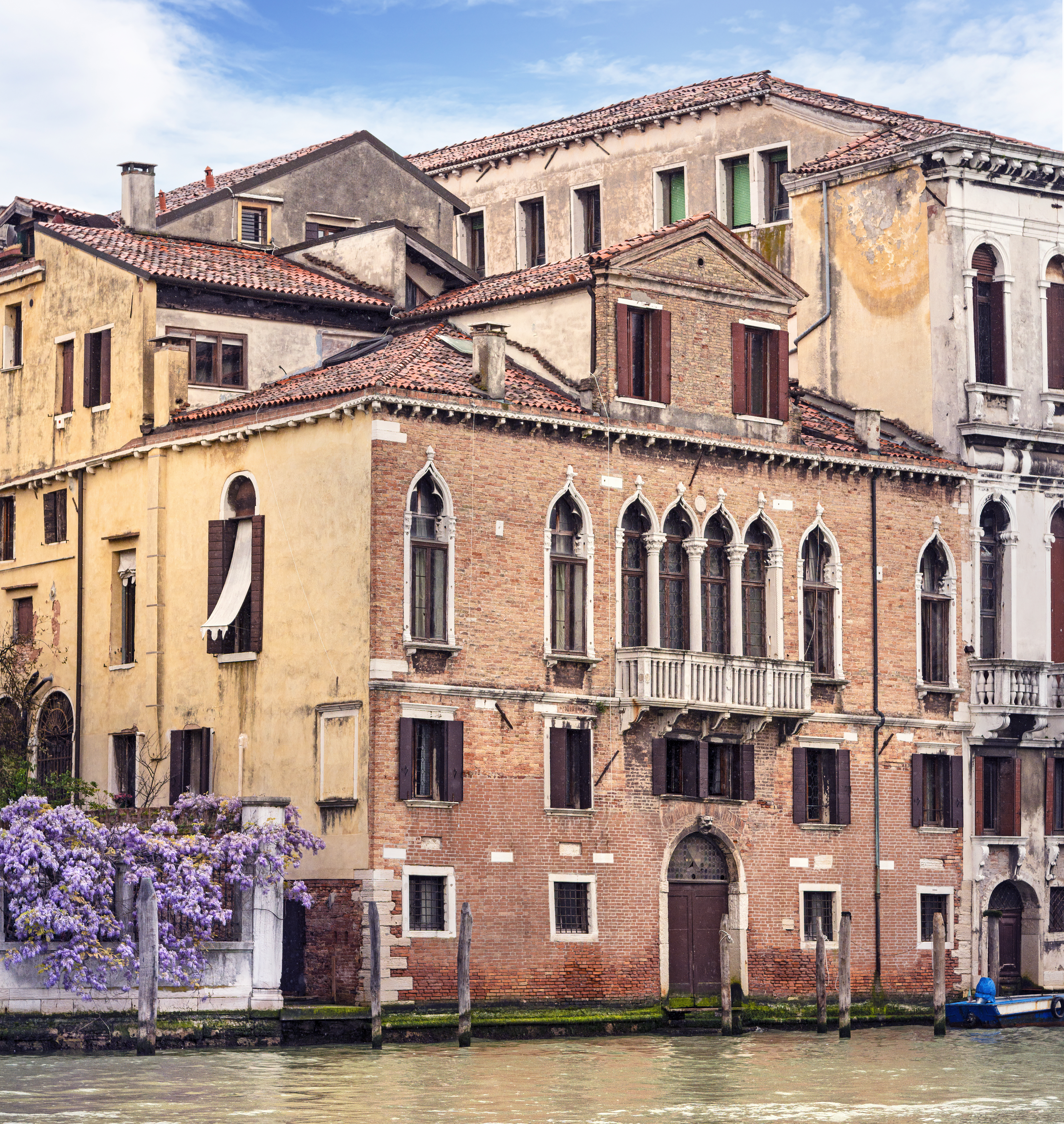
Palazzo Duodo with portion of Ca'Tron on right

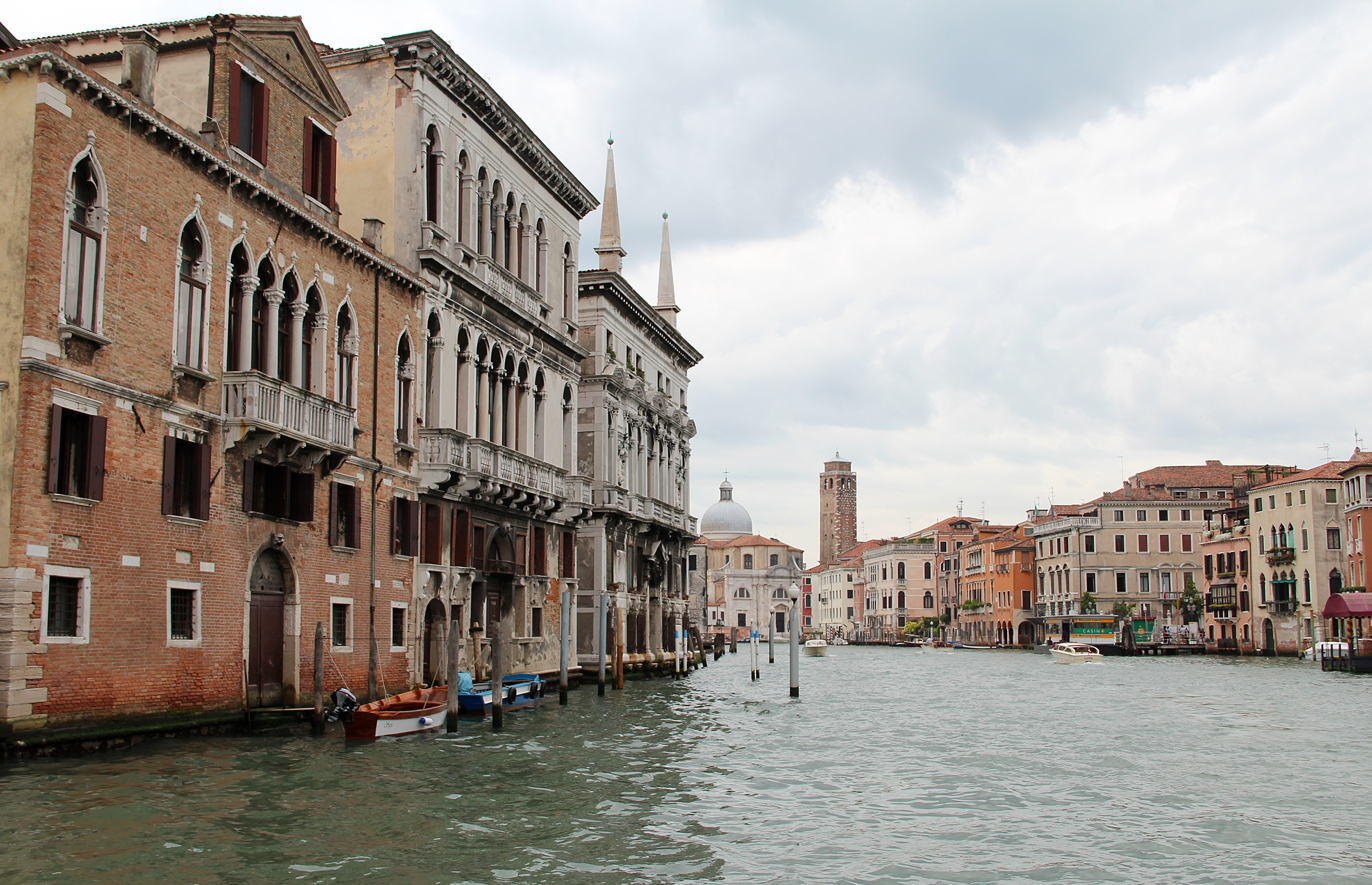
Palazzo Duodo with Ca'Tron and palzzo Belloni Battagia on right

Palazzo Duodo is a Gothic-style palace on the Canal Grande, located between the Ca' Tron and the Palazzo Priuli Bon, in the sestiere of Santa Croce, in Venice, Italy. There is a second Palazzo Duodo a Campo Sant'Angelo.

The palace was built in the 15th century. In 1712 it was let to Marchese Orazio Lancilotti, and in 1740 there were several tenants. In 1808 it belonged to Carlo Duodo of S. Maria Zobenigo
