= Baldassare Longhena =

Italian architect

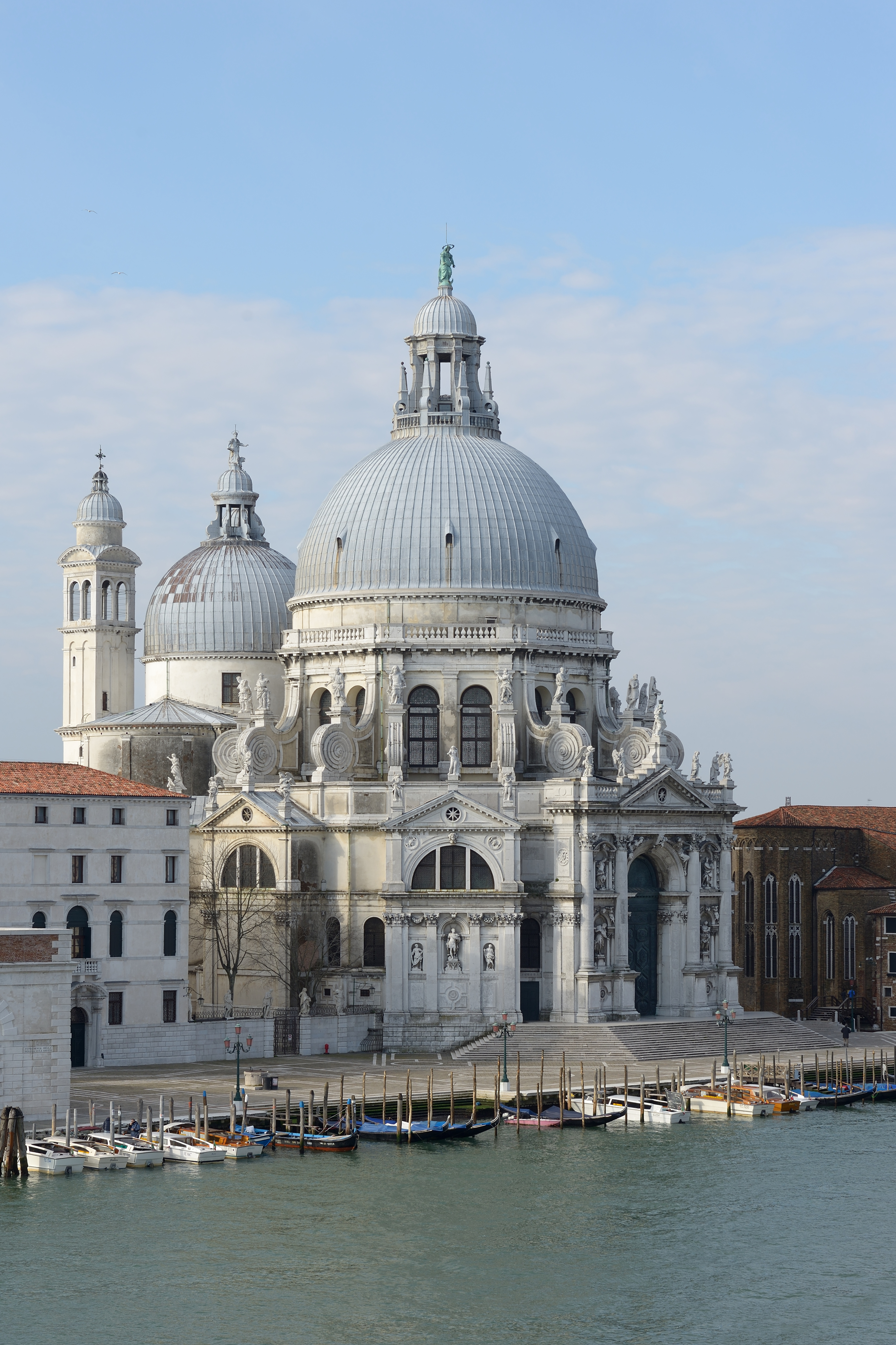
- Basilica di Santa Maria della Salute
- Born: 1598; Venice, Republic of Venice
- Died: 18 February 1682 (aged 83–84); Venice, Republic of Venice
- Occupation: Architect
- Movement: Baroque
- Practice: Vincenzo Scamozzi
- Buildings: Santa Maria della Salute; Ca' Pesaro; Ca' Rezzonico; Palazzo Giustinian Lolin

Baldassare Longhena (1598 – 18 February 1682) was an Italian architect, who worked mainly in Venice, where he was one of the greatest exponents of Baroque architecture of the period. His style is characterized by monumentality, skillful use of light and shadow, and an understanding of Venetian aesthetics.

== Biography ==
Born in Venice to his father Melchisedecco, a stone-carver who contrived to have Longhena study under the architect Vincenzo Scamozzi. After Scamozzi's death Longhena completed his monumental Procuratie Nuove in St. Mark's Square, a complex of imposing residences and offices for officials of the Venetian Republic that gives the square its appearance today.

His best-known work is the elegantly decorated Basilica di Santa Maria della Salute begun in 1631 to thank the Virgin for the city's deliverance from the plague. This two domed church on the peninsula between the Canal Grande and the Zattere is one of the city's best-known landmarks. The main entrance, modeled on the Roman triumphal arch, was later copied in successive churches and cathedrals, in Venice and elsewhere.

On 16 December 1640, Longhena was appointed Proto dei Procuratori (Master Builder of the Republic of Venice), a position he would hold for almost forty years. Between 1641 and 1680 he designed the new library, the grand staircase, the monastery façade, the Novitiate building, the sick-room and the guest-rooms of the Monastery of San Giorgio Maggiore.

He designed many other churches in the city, among them the Chiesa dell'Ospedaletto and Santa Maria di Nazareth built between 1656 and 1680, although the façade of the latter church was designed by Giuseppe Sardi (1624–1699). He also designed the Palazzo Belloni Battagia and the Palazzo Giustinian Lolin, both facing the Canal Grande.

One of his largest designs was the Chioggia Cathedral, executed between 1624 and 1647. On the completion of the cathedral he designed two other palaces on the Grand Canal of Venice, Ca' Rezzonico and Ca' Pesaro, both completed after his death. He potentially made additions or modifications to the Palazzo Vidiman, Palazzo Moro in San Canciano, and the façade of San Zaccaria on the Rio della Pietà.

Baldassare Longhena died at his home in Corte Rotto at San Severo in 1682.

== Critical reception ==
Longhena developed the style of his master Vincenzo Scamozzi and Andrea Palladio. As Branko Mitrović states in his book on renaissance architecture: "Scamozzi...adjusted the central intercolumnation of the main portico so that the edges of columns can be seen from the end of a circular hall. Visually, this is a way to suggest from inside that there is another formal space beyond the entrance door... Baldassare Longhena used a similar system of non-orthogonal axes in Santa Maria della Salute in Venice. As with Palladio, it is unclear whether Longhena intended to form such visual axes or whether they are a by-product of his complex geometries."

== Gallery ==
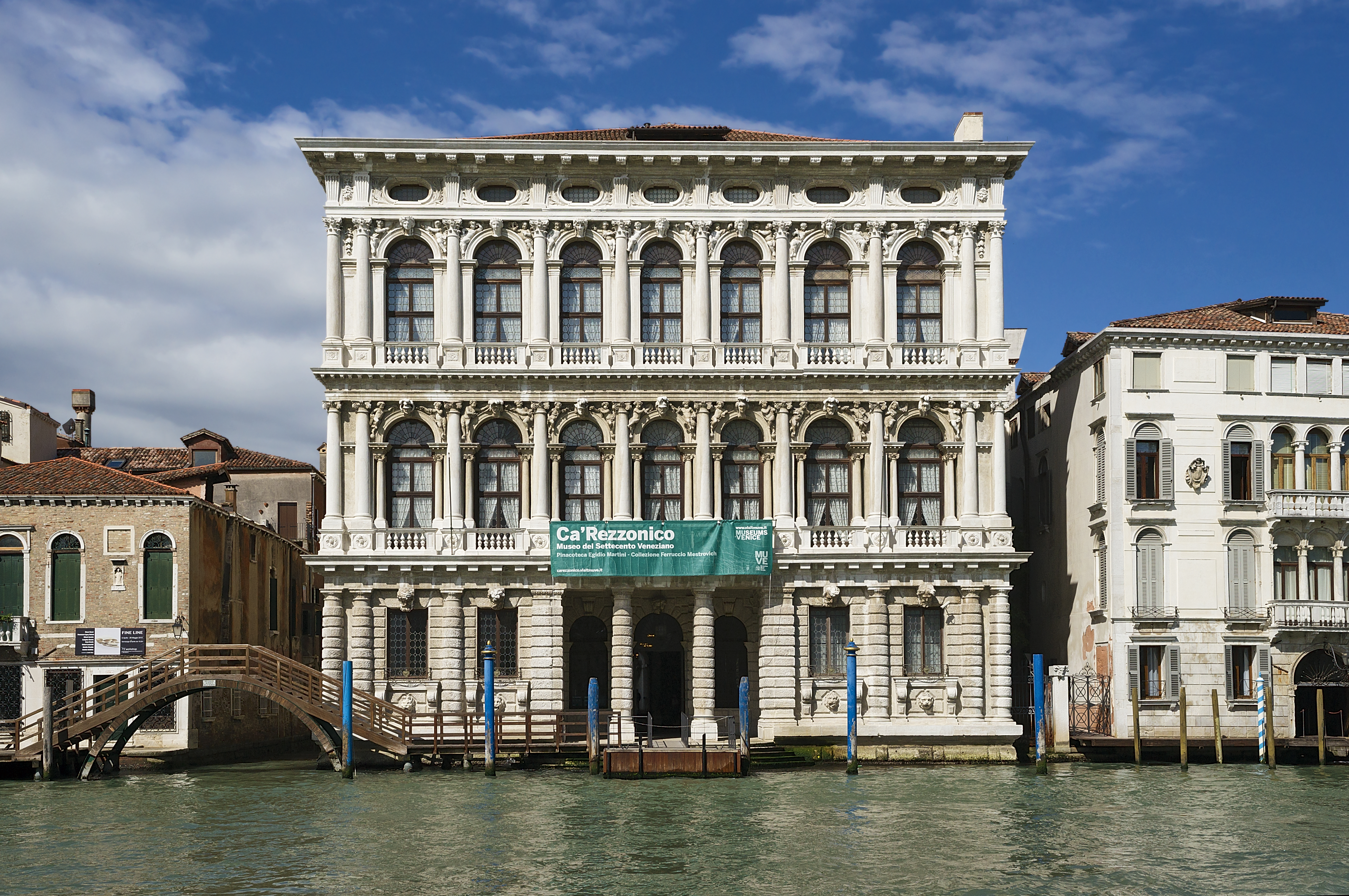
Ca' Rezzonico

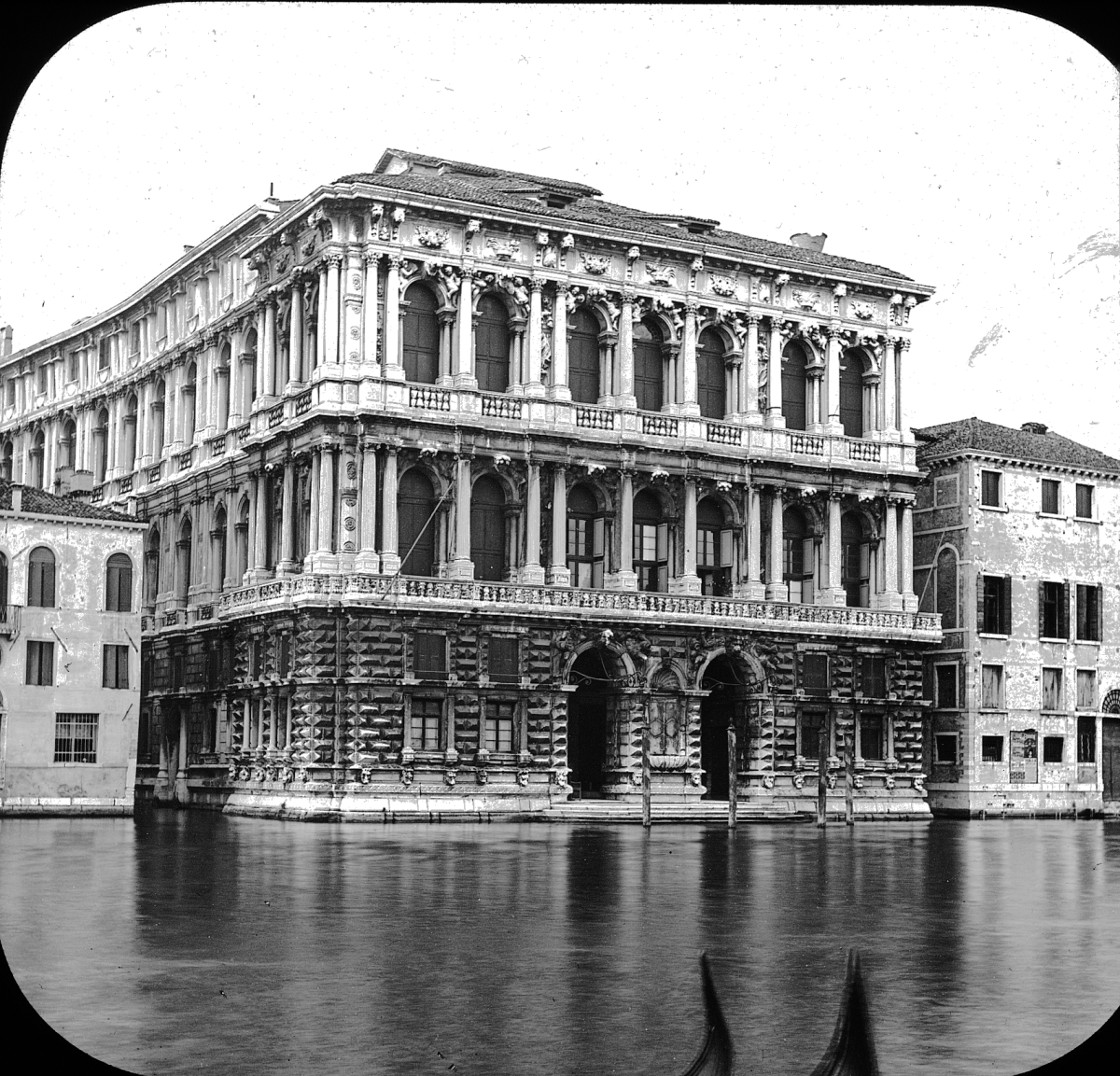
Ca' Pesaro

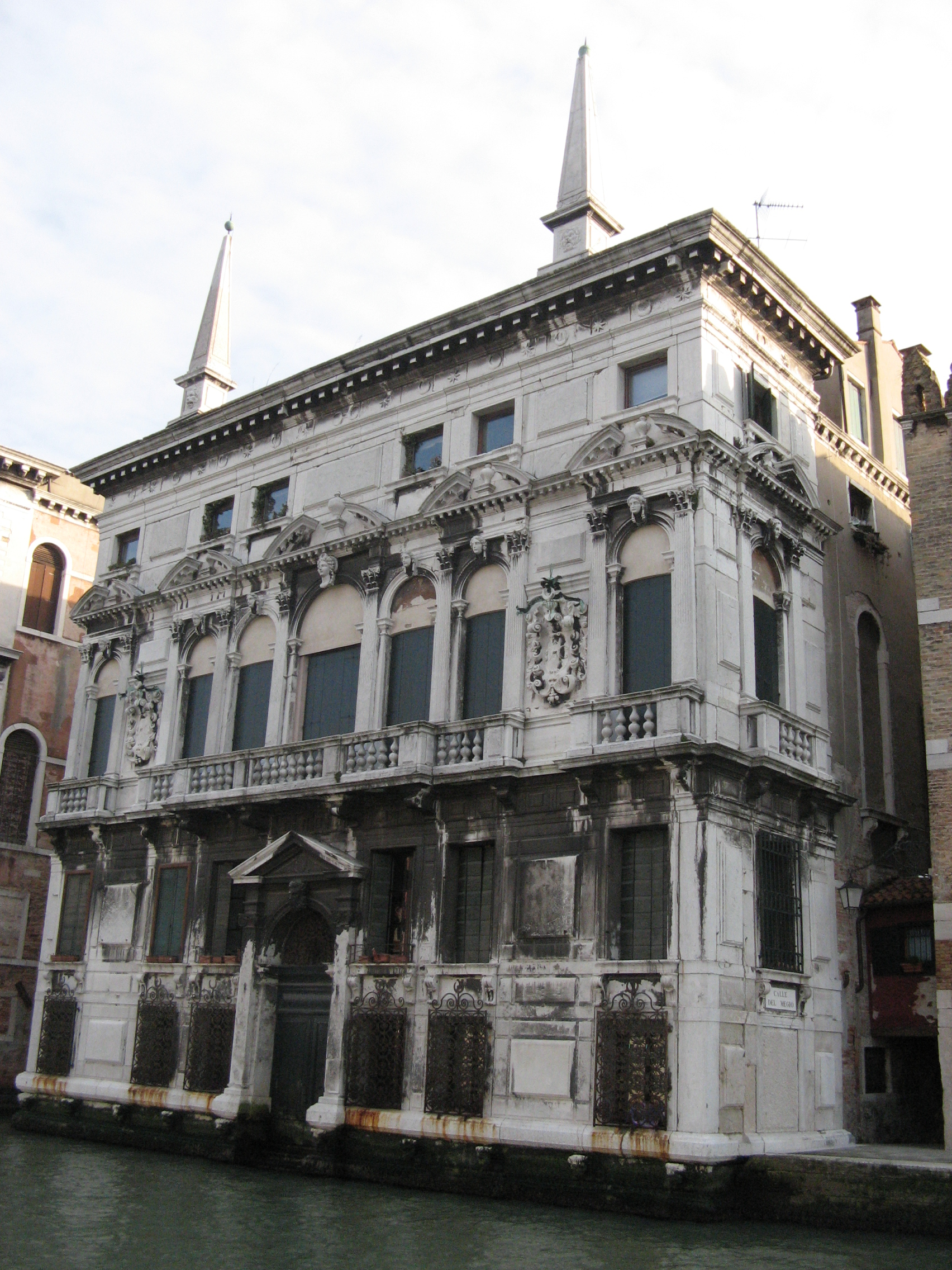
Palazzo Belloni-Battagia

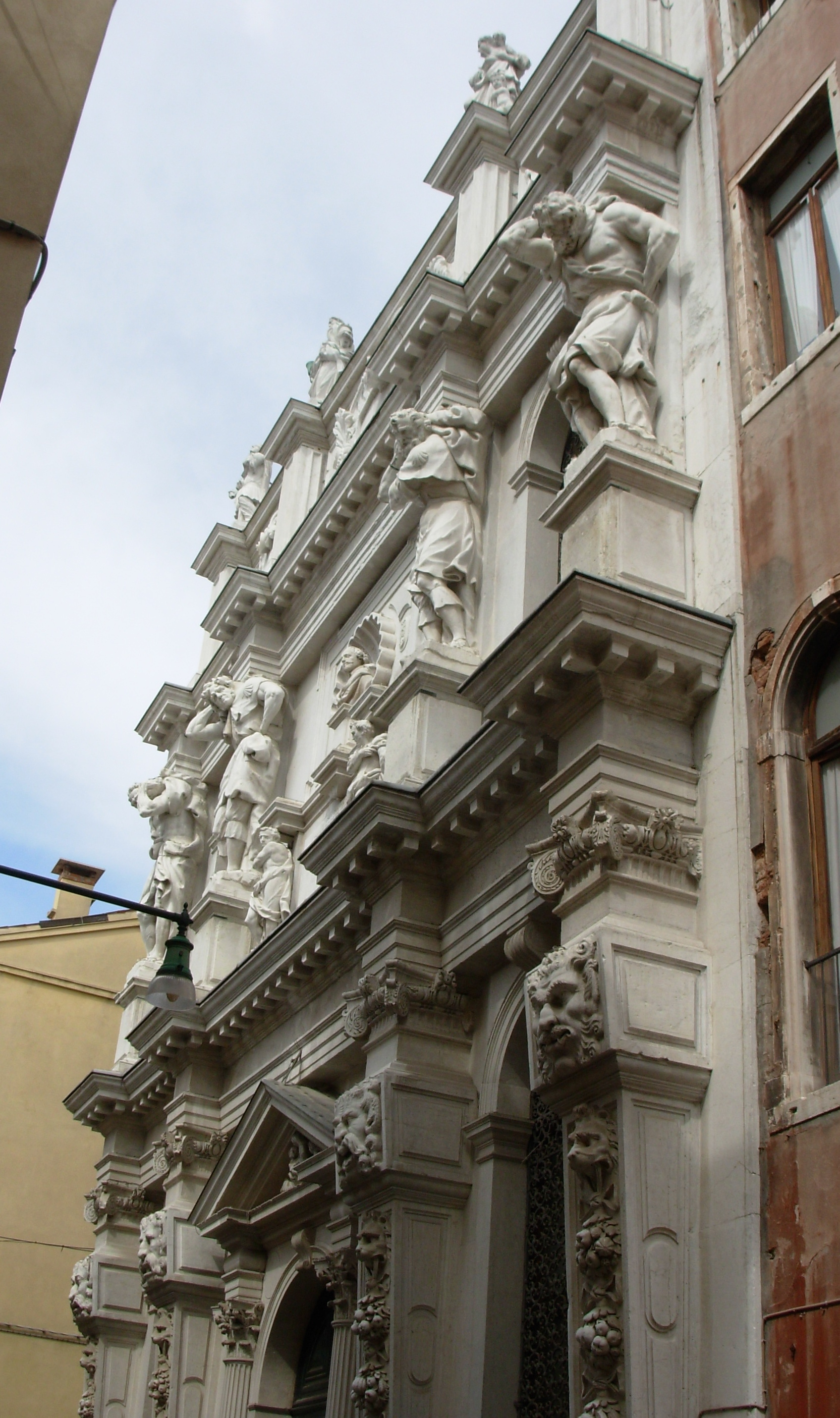
Ospedaletto, Venice

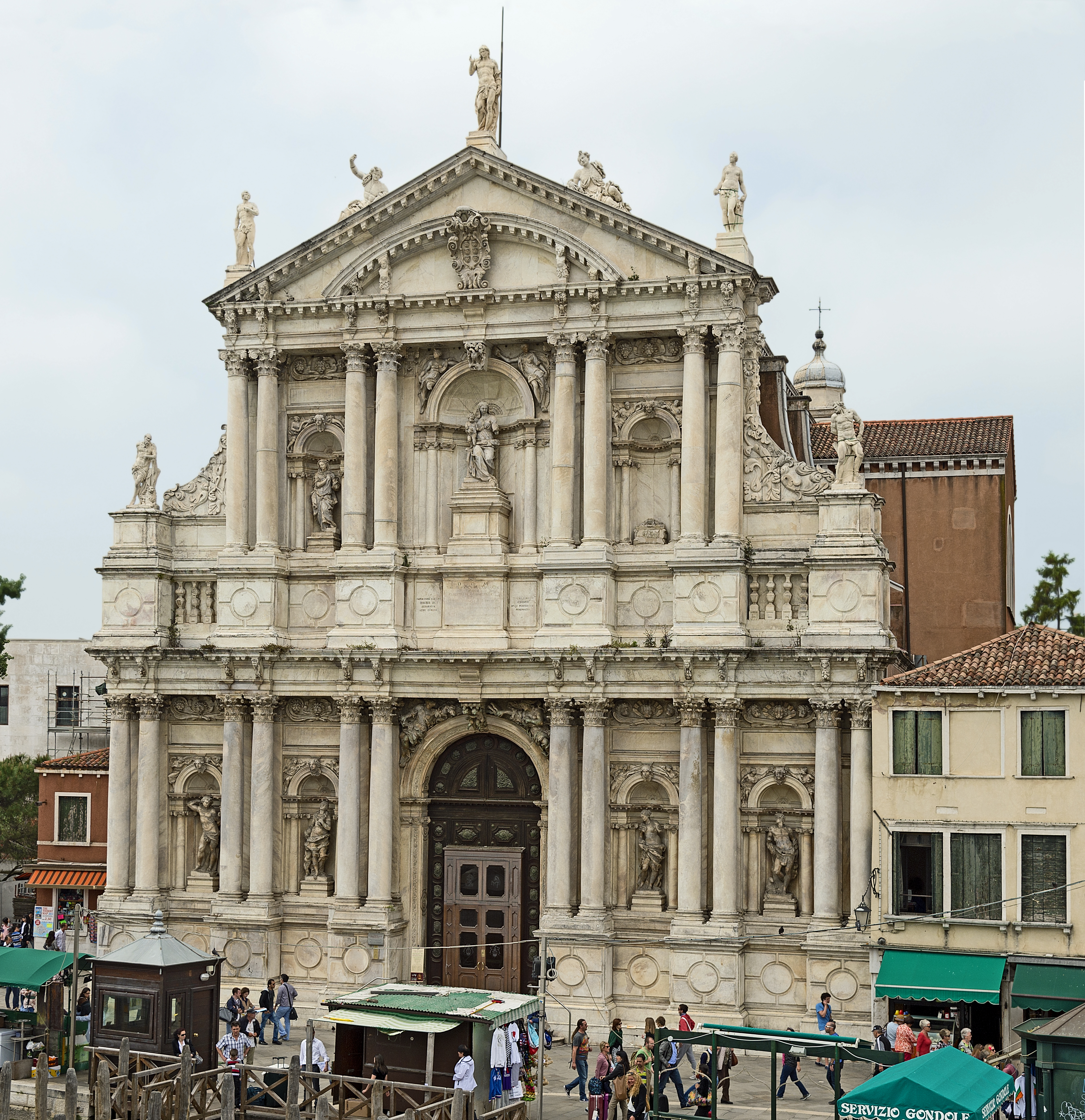
Santa Maria degli Scalzi

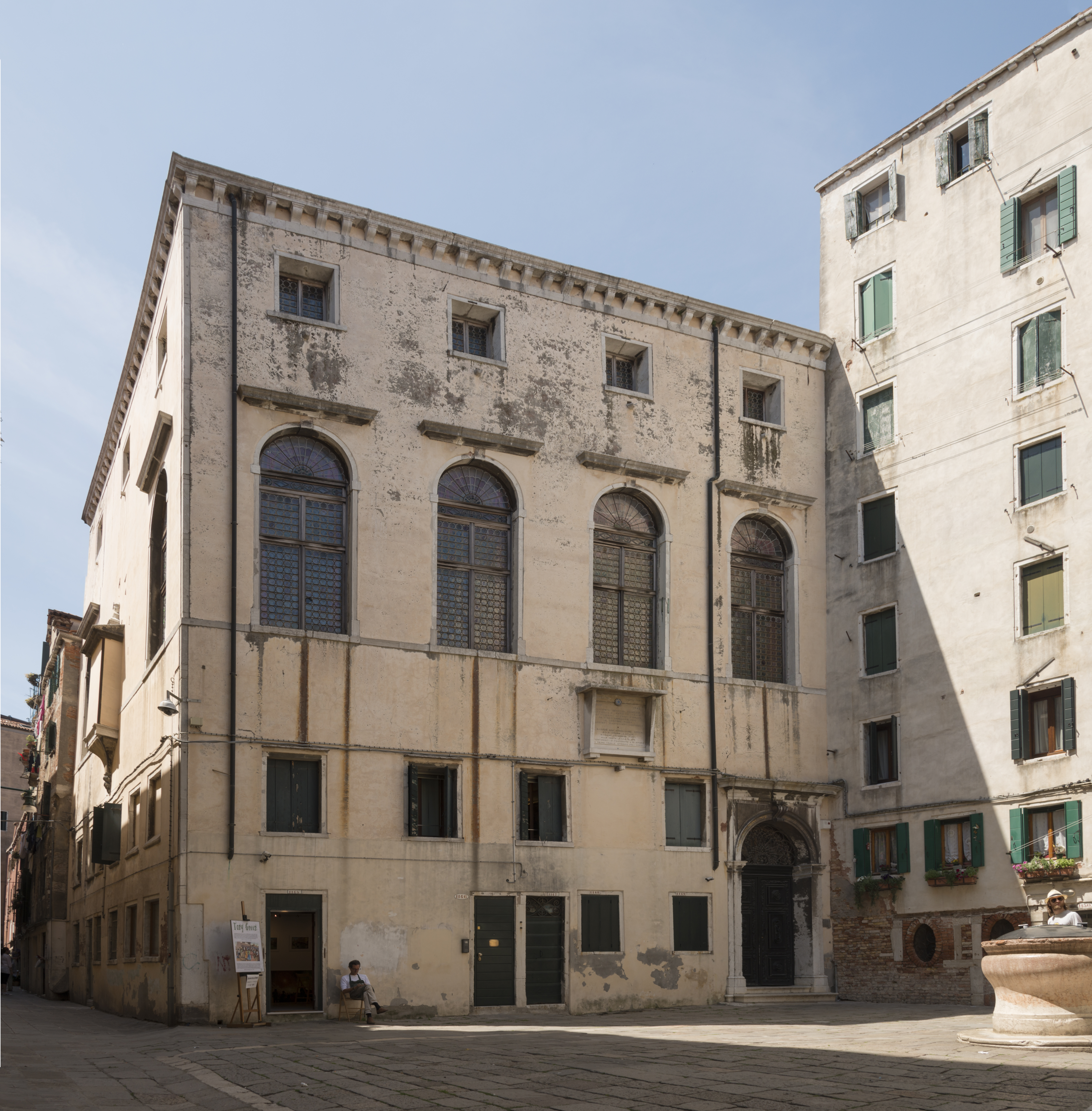
Scola spagnola

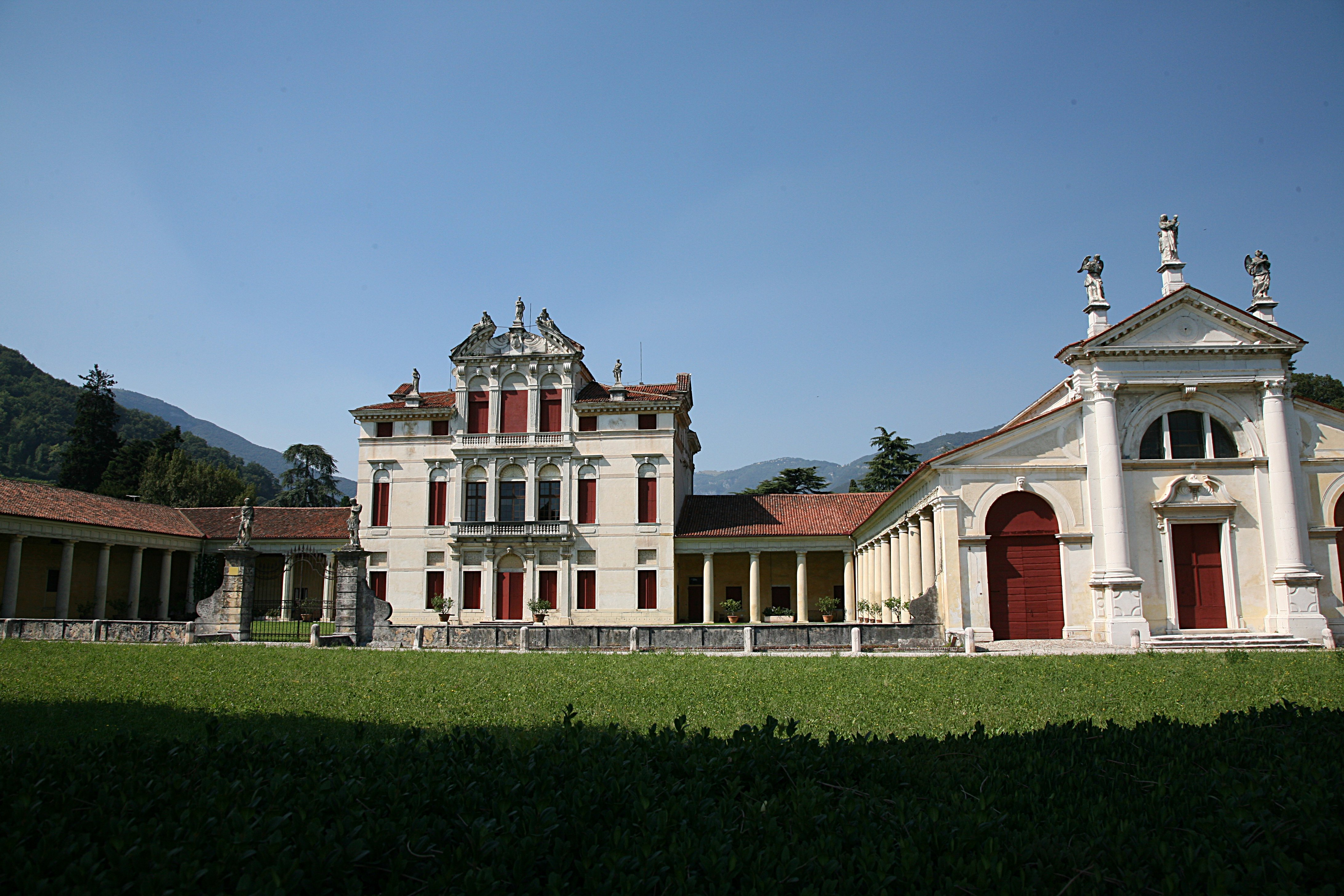
Villa Angarano

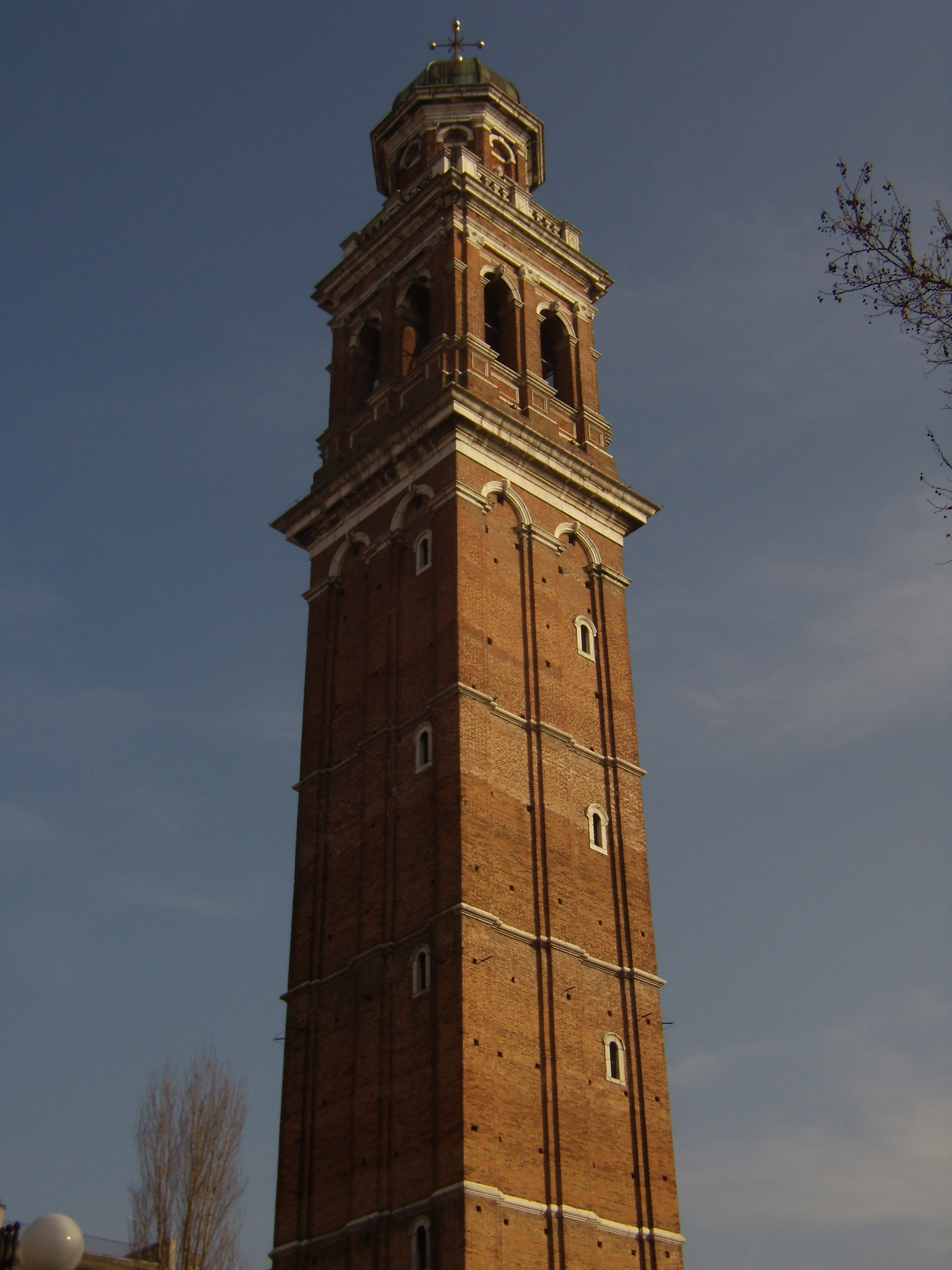
Belltower of
Santa Maria del Soccorso, Rovigo

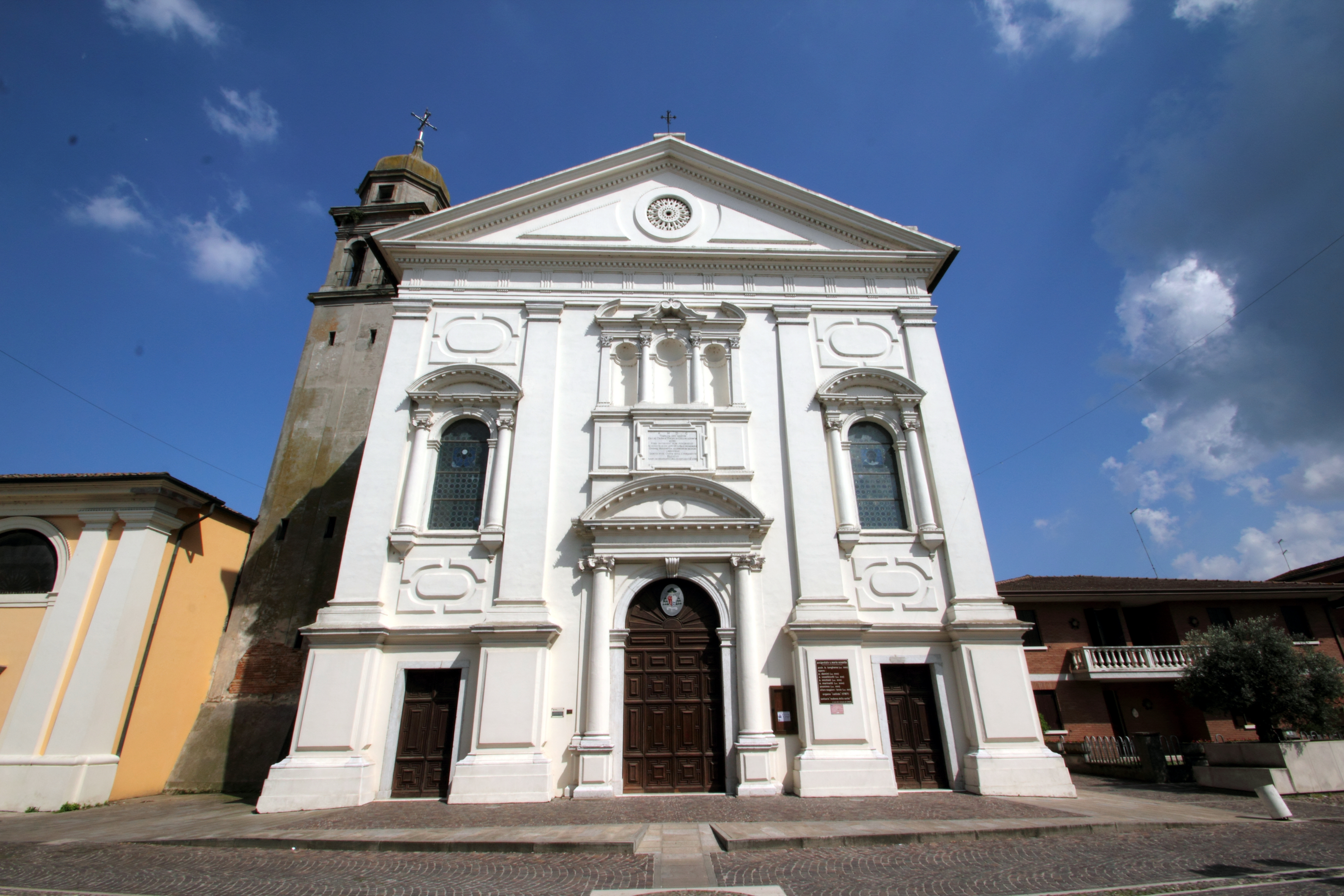
Church of Santa Maria Assunta, Loreo, Italy

== Bibliography ==
- Mitrović, Branko (2004). Learning from Palladio. New York: WW. Norton Press. ISBN 978-0393731163.
- Frank, Martina (2004). Baldassare Longhena. Venice: Ist. Veneto di Scienze. ISBN 978-8888143545.
- Hopkins, Andrew (2006). Baldassare Longhena. Milan: Electa. ISBN 978-8843597031.
- Martin, S. B. (1916). "Architects of the later Renaissance in Italy. V—Baldassare Longhena in Venice". The Architectural Review. 39 (231): 25–26, 26a, 26b, 27–30.
- Wittkower, Rudolph (1957). "S. Maria della Salute: scenographic architecture and the Venetian baroque". Journal of the Society of Architectural Historians. 16: 3–10.
