= Fondaco del Megio =

Coordinates: 45°26′31″N 12°19′45″E

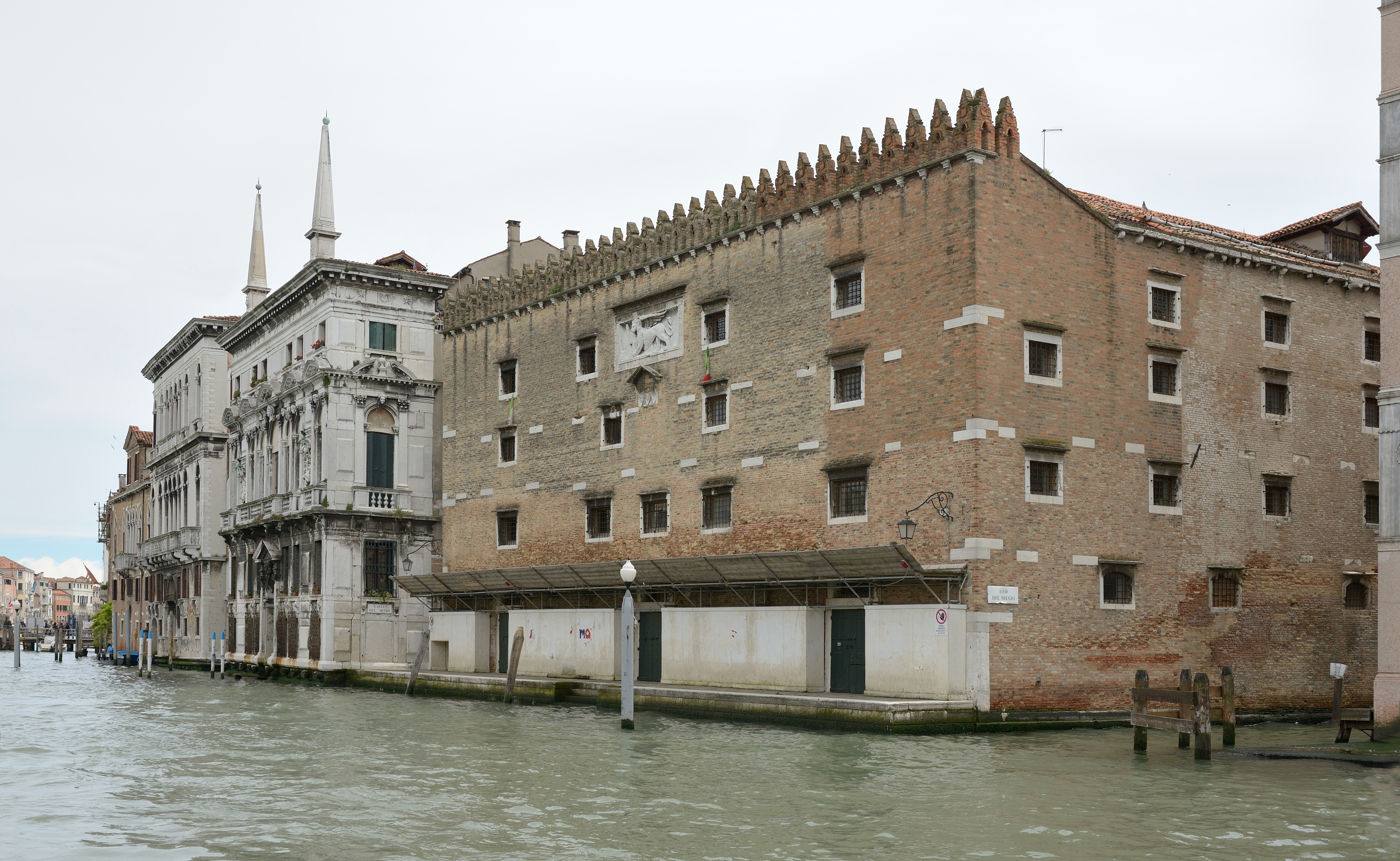
Façade of the Fondaco del Megio.

The Fondaco del Megio (Venetian, also Fontego; Italian: Fondaco del miglio, lit. 'fondaco of millet') is a palace in the sestiere (quarter]) of Santa Croce in Venice, northern Italy. Located near the Palazzo Belloni Battagia and the Fondaco dei Turchi, it faces the Canal Grande and is opposed to the church of San Marcuola of Cannaregio.

It was built in the 13th century as a grain depot, but later was used to store millet, maintaining this function until the fall of the Republic of Venice in 1797. It currently houses an elementary school.

The palace is built in brickwork. There are three portals at the ground floor and thirteen small windows. Decorations include a row of merlons at the top, and a basrelief with the Lion of St. Mark (a modern reconstruction of the original, which was placed on every public building of the Republic).

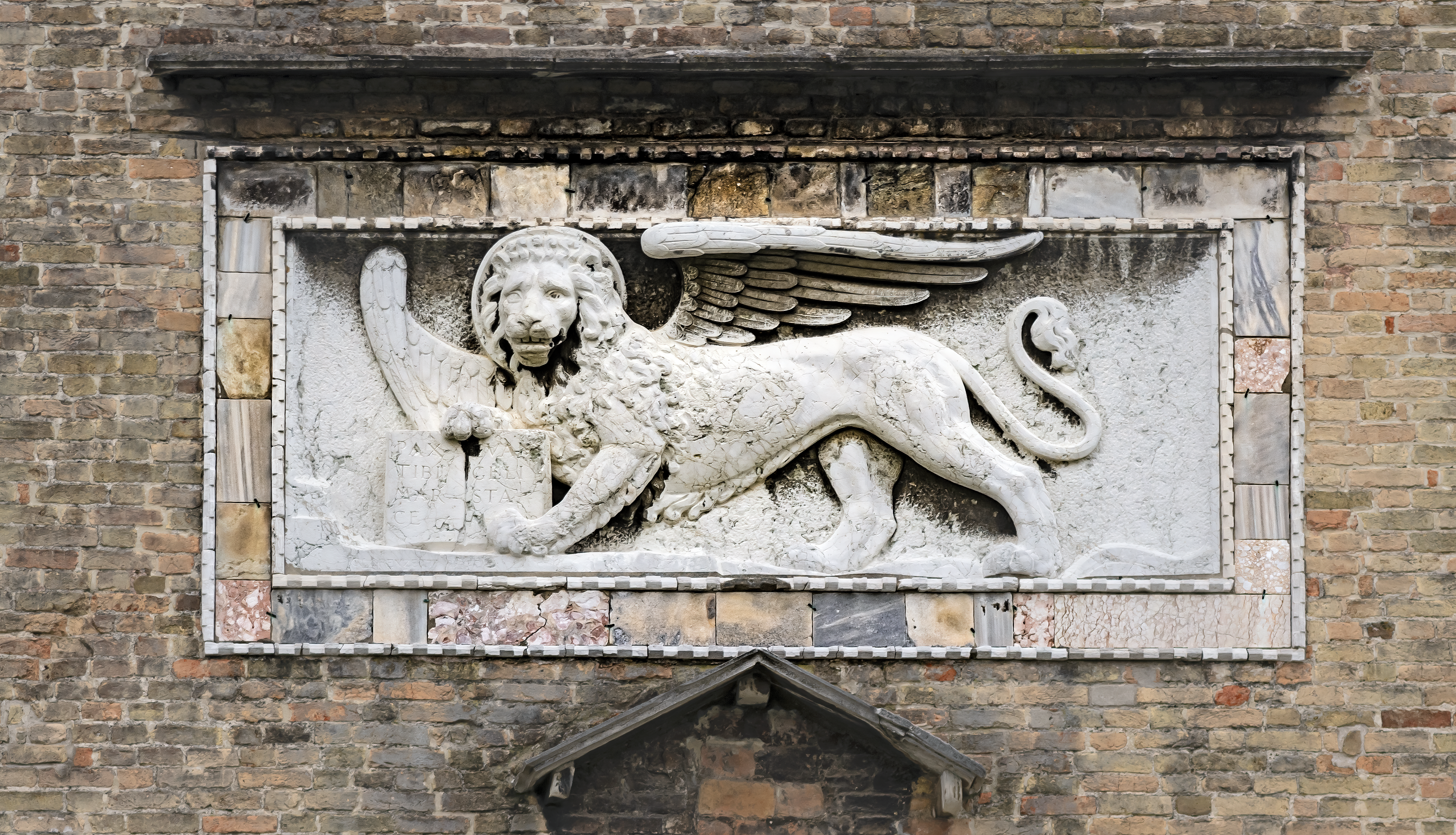
Lion of St. Mark

== Sources ==
- Brusegan, Marcello (2005). La grande guida dei monumenti di Venezia. Rome: Newton & Compton. ISBN 88-541-0475-2.
