= Ponte dei Tre Archi =

Three Arches' Bridge Ponte dei Tre Archi
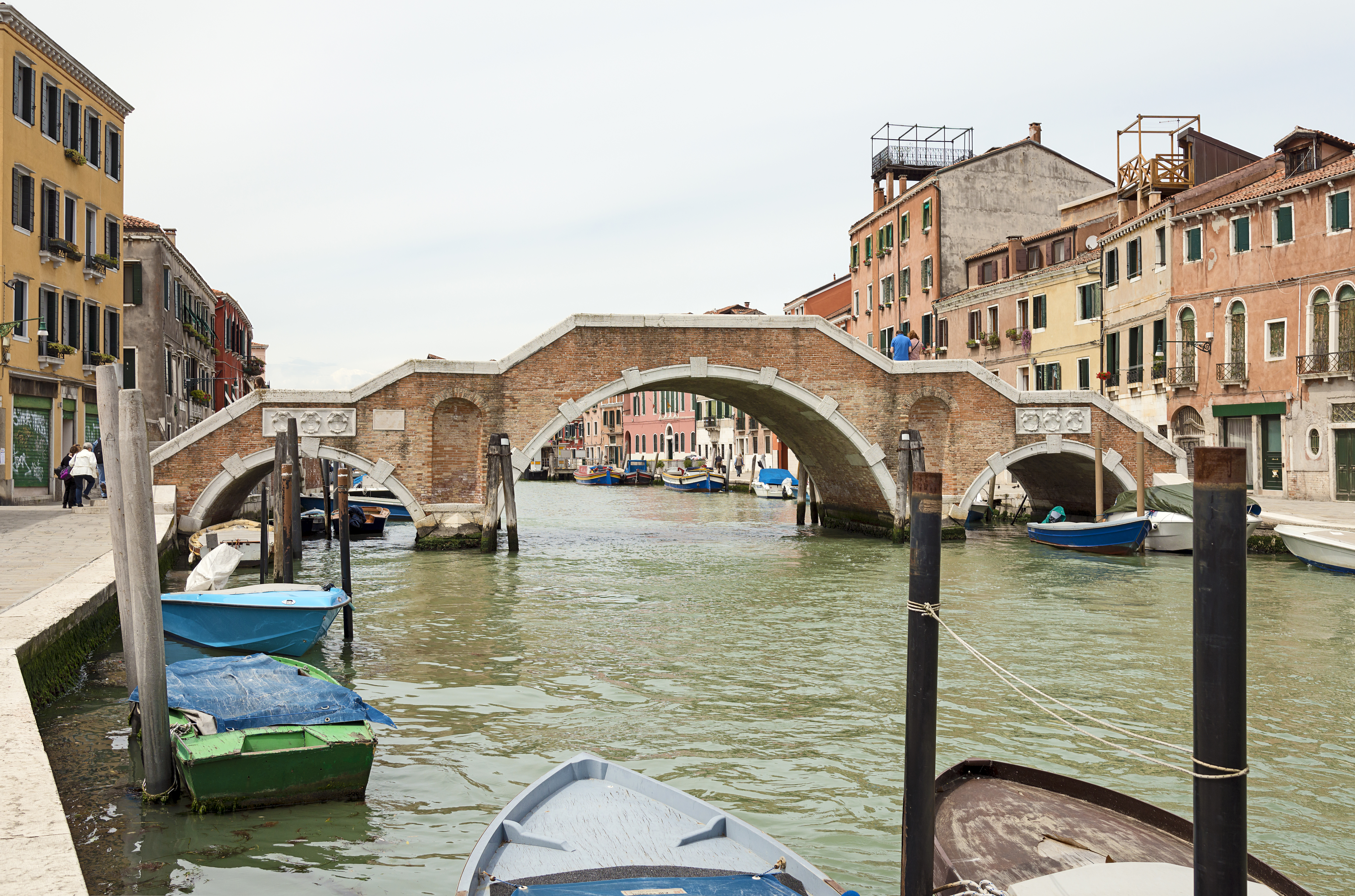
- Coordinates: 45°26′44″N 12°19′15″E
- Carries: pedestrians
- Crosses: Cannaregio Canal
- Locale: Venice, Italy

Characteristics
- Design: Arch bridge
- Material: Brick and Istrian stone
- No. of spans: 3

History
- Architect: Andrea Tirali
- Opened: 1680

Location
- Interactive map of Three Arches' Bridge

The Ponte dei Tre Archi (Italian for "Three Arches' Bridge") is one of the main bridges of Venice, Italy, along with the Ponte delle Guglie, the other bridge spanning the Cannaregio Canal, and the four bridges spanning the Canal Grande: Rialto, Scalzi, Accademia, and the Costituzione. It is located in Cannaregio district (sestiere), just South of Rio San Giobbe, linking the fondamenta San Giobbe, and the South-West area of Cannaregio, to the fondamenta di Sacca San Girolamo and the North-East of Cannaregio. As all other Venetian bridges, the Ponte dei Tre Archi is a pedestrian walkway.

The Baroque style bridge was designed in 1681 by Andrea Tirali, and is the sole three-arched bridge left in Venice. North of the bridge, towards the lagoon, is the former church of Santa Maria delle Penitenti and on the south is San Giobbe church located on its namesake square (campo).
