= Palazzo Cendon =

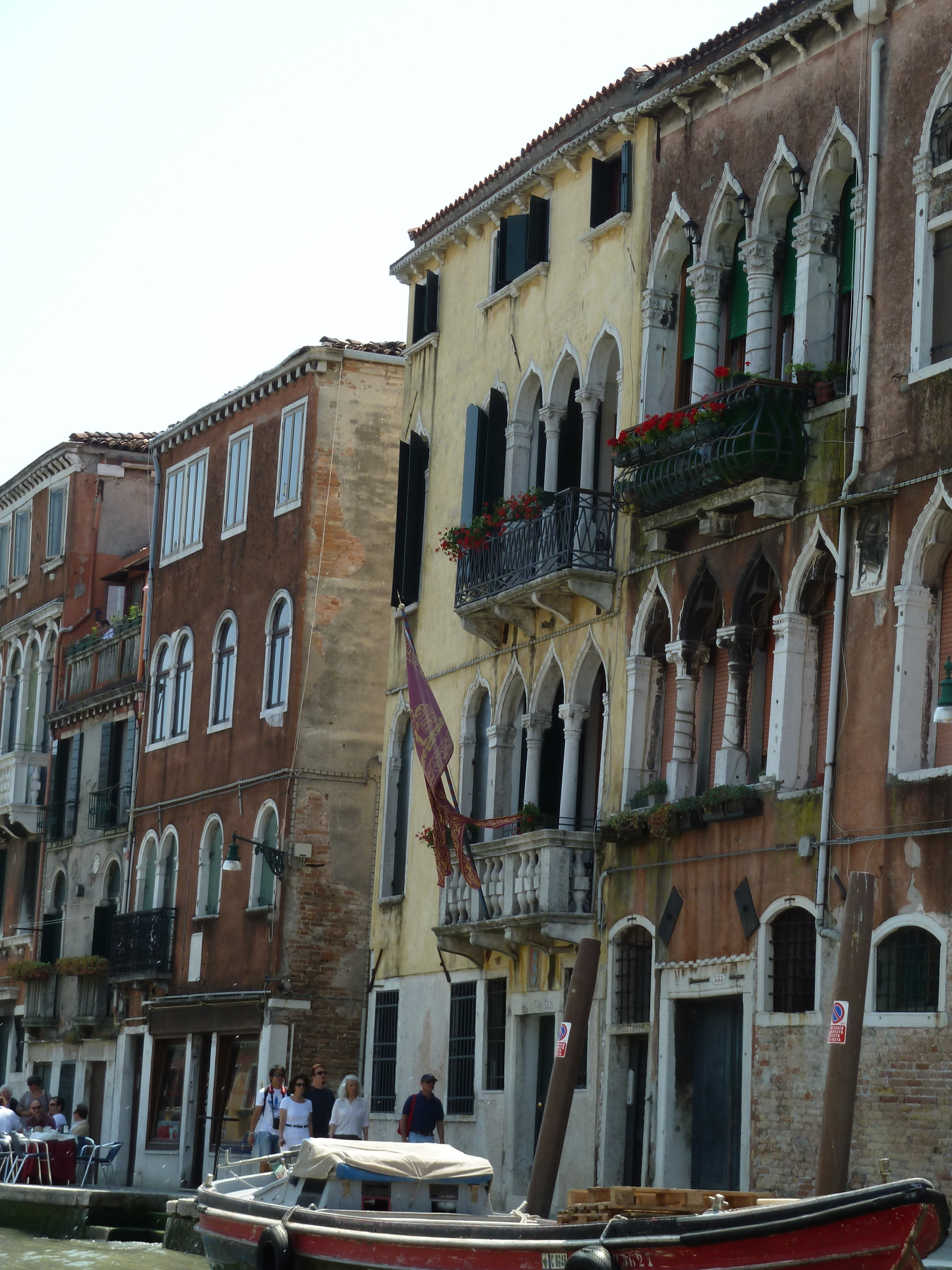
Palazzetti Cendon (Venice)

The Palazzo Cendon is a minor 15th-century palace recognized by some as a small palace by 1501 in Venice, Italy, located just off the southern promenade of the Cannaregio Canal (Fondamenta Savorgnan), about 200 feet east of Rio della Crea.
Currently it is used as a Residence de Charme.

== History ==
Palazzo Cendon, overlooking the Cannaregio Canal, is a rare example of a mixed Gothic-style building in Venice dating back to the 15th century. After the recent renovation that has preserved all the main features of its historic architecture, the palazzo is currently used as a Residence de Charme.

The history of the building began in 1437 with the construction of the residence by the wealthy family of Venetian merchants, the Cendons. Under the balcony, on the façade, the family's coat of arms is still visible, which in the middle of the shield carries three golden stars on a blue and red background. On the upper and lower edge of the stone an inscription states Centonia Fam. Nob. Olim Rom. Parm. Q. Ex Qua Pata Et Vene. Civil. MCCCCXXXVII. The inscription illustrates the family's origins; the Centon or Cendon family flourished in Rome and Parma, and then moved to Padua and eventually Venice.

The Cendons, according to the chronicles, had a great reputation among the merchants of Saint Mark Square, ties with many other noble families, and acquired a large wealth and built various buildings in Cannaregio.

Around 1530 a relevant expansion of the building absorbed the historical garden converting the outdoor spaces into more livable rooms, as the work needs and number of family members increased. At the end of the 16th century, the Cendons, to celebrate the glory of their family, edified their private chapel, still existing, in the nearby church of San Giobbe. In the church is the new family crest decorated with a lion on a stair, a later modification of the original 15th-century one on the building's façade.

After many years and after renovation, Palazzo Cendon has become an elegant hotel. The current owners have preserved the original style furniture and allure.
