= Cannaregio =

Historic sestieri (districts) of Venice

Coordinates: 45.446°N 12.327°E

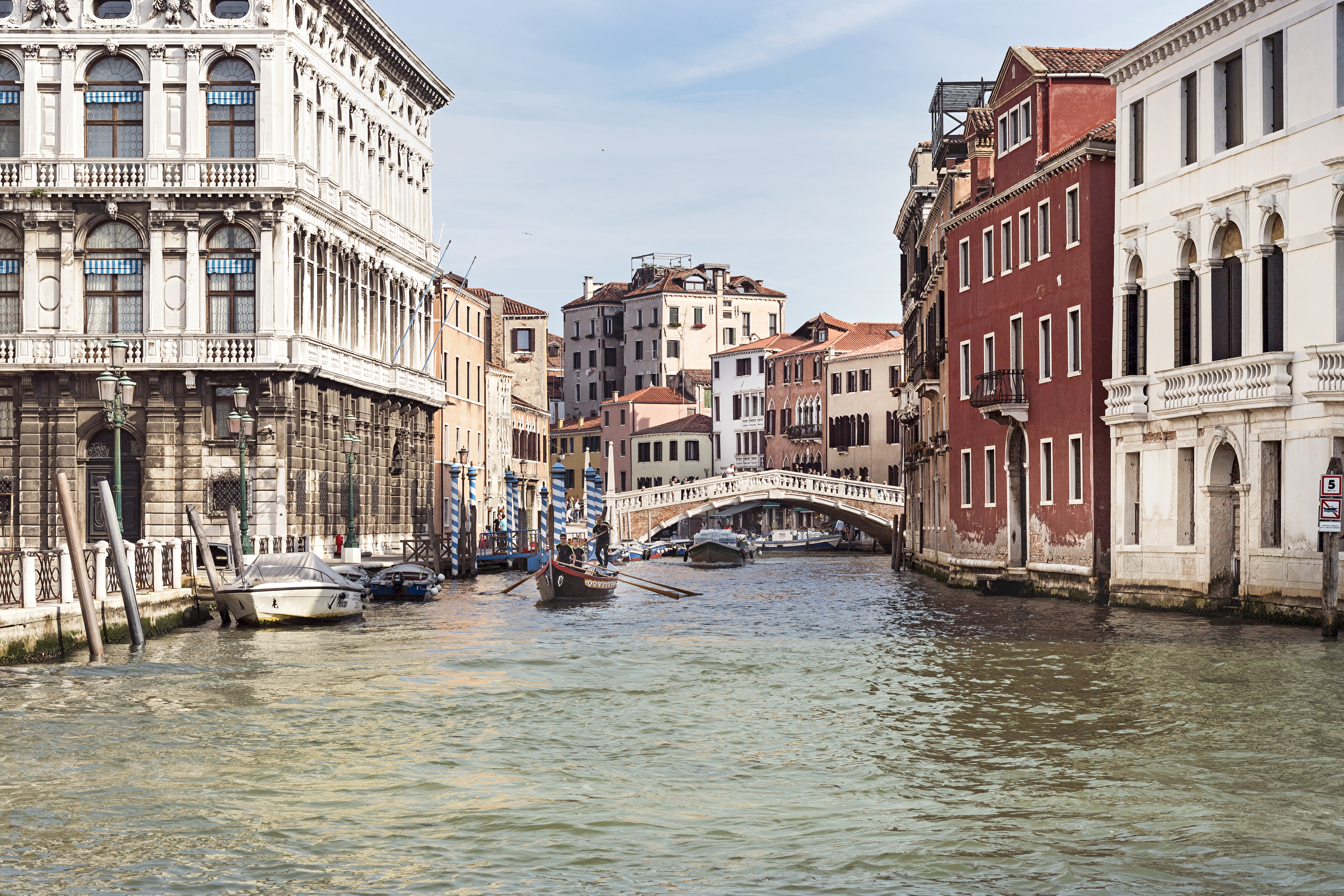
The Cannaregio Canal, the main artery of Cannaregio, seen from the Grand Canal.

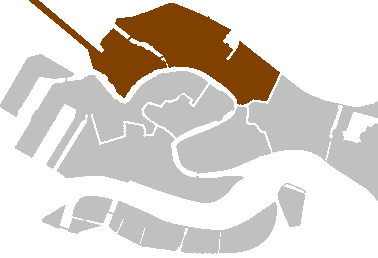
Location of Cannaregio within Venice.

Cannaregio (Italian: [kannaˈreːdʒo]; Venetian: Canarégio) is the northernmost of the six historic sestieri of Venice, Italy. It is the second largest sestiere by land area and the largest by population, with 13,169 people as of 2007.

Isola di San Michele, the historic cemetery island, is associated with the district.

== History ==
The Cannaregio Canal, which was the main route into the city until the construction of a railway link to the mainland, gave the district its name (Canal Regio is Italian for Royal Canal). Development began in the eleventh century as the area was drained and parallel canals were dredged. Although elegant palazzos were built facing the Grand Canal, the area grew primarily with working class housing and manufacturing. Beginning in 1516, Jews were restricted to living in the Venetian Ghetto. It was enclosed by guarded gates and no one was allowed to leave from sunset to dawn. However, Jews held successful positions in the city such as merchants, physicians, money lenders, and other trades. Restrictions on daily Jewish life continued for more than 270 years, until Napoleon Bonaparte conquered the Venetian Republic in 1797. He removed the gates and gave all residents the freedom to live where they chose.

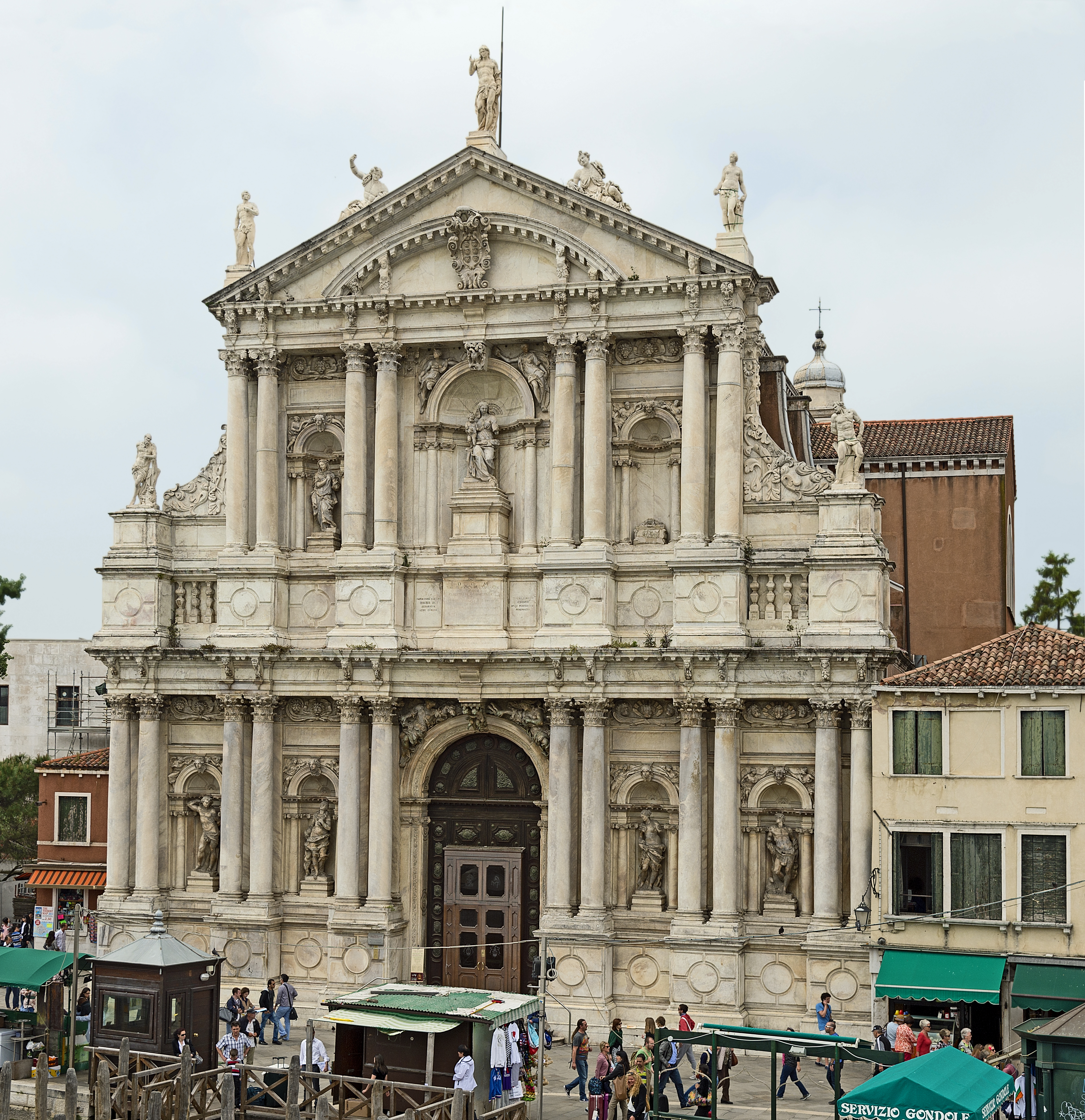
Santa Maria di Nazareth, known as Chiesa degli Scalzi.

In the 19th century, civil engineers built a street named Strada Nuova through Cannaregio, and a railway bridge and road bridge were constructed to connect Venice directly to Mestre. Today, the areas of the district along the Grand Canal from the train station to the Rialto Bridge are packed with tourists, but the rest of Cannaregio is residential and relatively peaceful, with morning markets, neighborhood shops, and small cafés.

== Main sights ==
- Venetian Ghetto
- Venezia Santa Lucia railway station
- Ponte delle Guglie
- Ponte dei Tre Archi
- Palazzo Bollani Erizzo
- Palazzo Bonfadini Vivante
- Palazzo Calbo Crotta
- Palazzo Contarini Pisani
- Palazzo Correr Contarini Zorzi
- Palazzo Giustinian Pesaro
- Palazzo Falier
- Palazzo Labia
- Palazzo Mastelli del Cammello
- Palazzo Memmo Martinengo Mandelli
- Palazzo Michiel del Brusà
- Palazzo Nani
- Palazzo Savorgnan
- Palazzo Surian Bellotto
- Palazzo Smith Mangilli Valmarana
- Palazzo Testa
- Palazzetto da Lezze
- Isola di San Michele
- Ca' Vendramin Calergi
- Ca' d'Oro
- Sacca della Misericordia
- Palazzo Cendon

== Churches ==
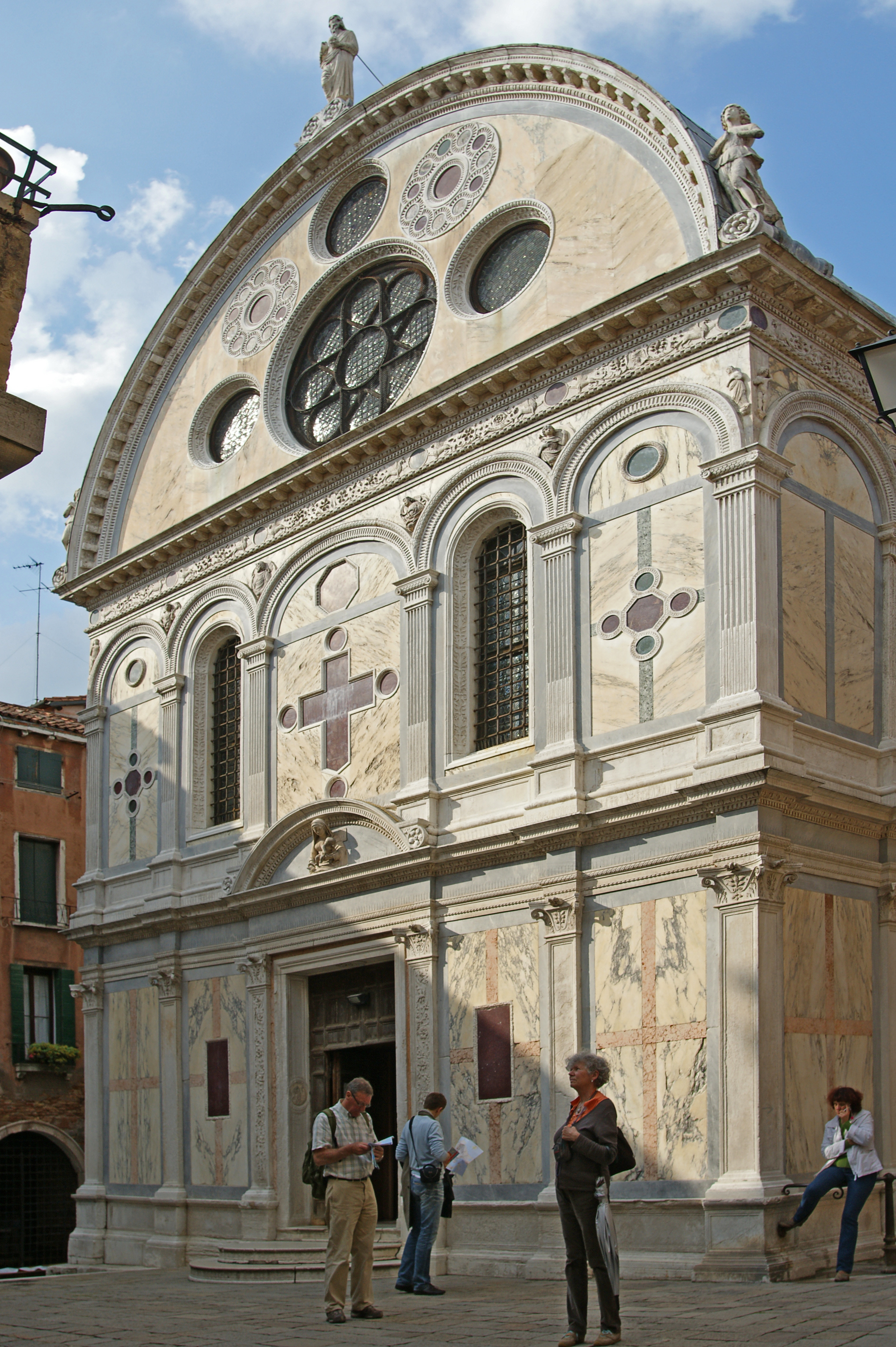
Chiesa di Santa Maria dei Miracoli.

See: List of Churches in Cannaregio

- Santa Maria di Nazareth, known as Chiesa degli Scalzi
- Santa Maria dei Miracoli
- Sant'Alvise
- San Giovanni Crisostomo
- San Geremia
- San Canciano
- Madonna dell'Orto
- Abbazia della Misericordia

== See also ==
- Sestieri of Venice
