= Palazzo Bonfadini Vivante =

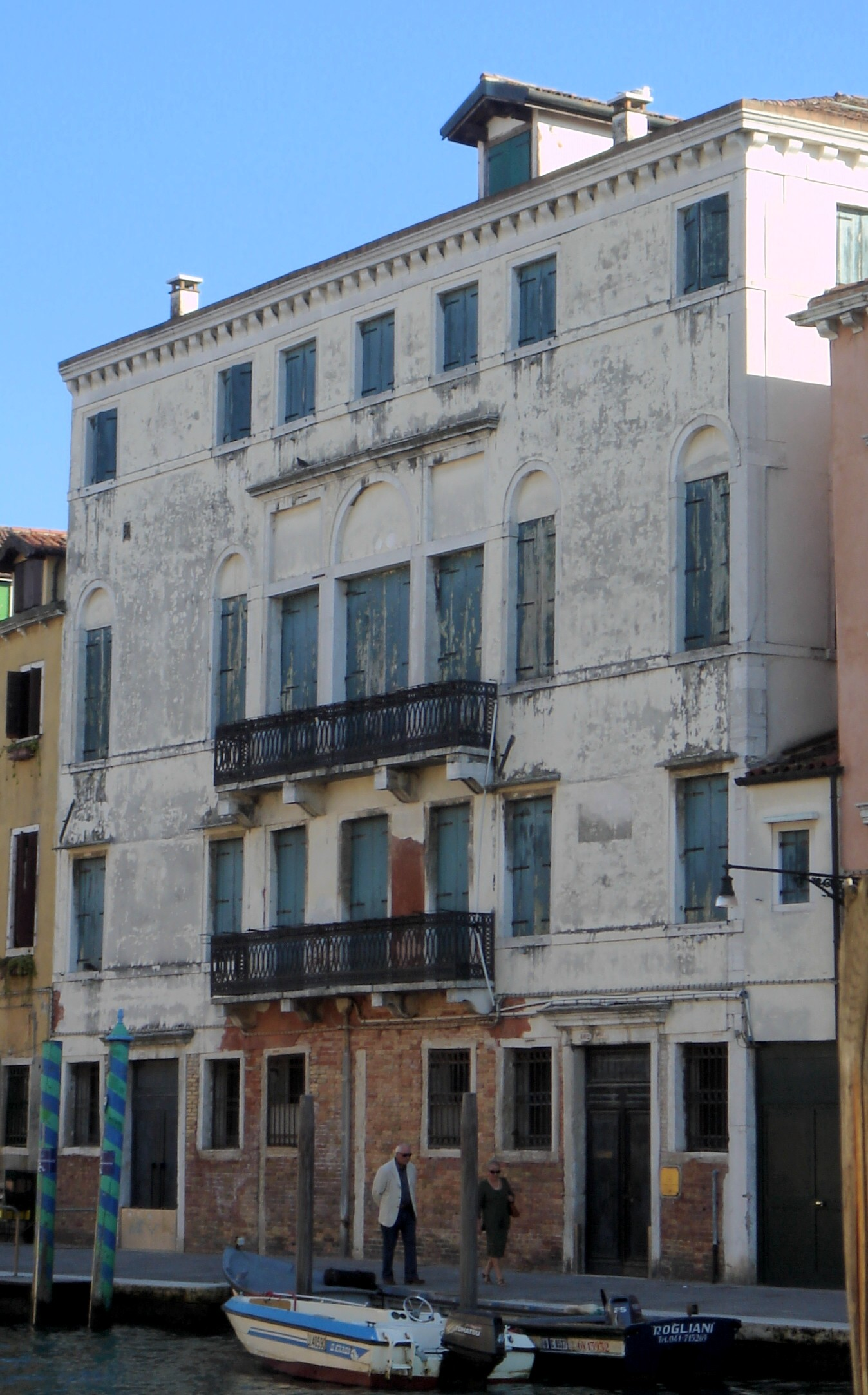
- Palazzo Bonfadini Vivante
- Interactive map of the Palazzo Bonfadini Vivante area

General information
- Type: Residential
- Architectural style: Renaissance
- Location: Cannaregio district, Venice, Italy
- Coordinates: 45°26′39.74″N 12°19′24.54″E
- Construction stopped: 16th century
- Owner: Finalba seconda s.p.a.

Technical details
- Floor count: 4 levels

Palazzo Bonfadini Vivante is a palace in Venice, Italy located in the Cannaregio district and overlooking the Cannaregio canal. The neighboring buildings are Palazzo Savorgnan and Palazzo Testa.

== History ==
The palace was built in the 16th century to be a residence of the Bonfadinis, a family of Tyrolean merchants who joined the Venetian patriciate. In the mid-17th century, the present façade was completed. In the 19th century, the Jewish family of the Vivantes settled in the palazzo, initially as a tenant, giving the building its second name. In the first half of the 20th century, the building suffered a prolonged degradation until the new owners carried out an important restoration in the 1990s.

== Architecture ==
The façade of the palazzo is rather simple, of three levels and an attic on top. The structure has two rectangular portals on the ground floor flanked by square windows. The second noble floor is decorated with the most important element, a serliana with a metal parapet. The first noble floor below has a similar layout with smaller quadrangular openings, also with parapet. Finally, the façade terminates with a thin dentilled cornice and stringcourse.

The palazzo interiors are of notable artistic value, decorated with artworks made between the 18th and 19th centuries by Giuseppe Castelli, Giuseppe Borsato, and Giambattista Canal.
