= Palazzo Surian Bellotto =

Building in Venice, Italy

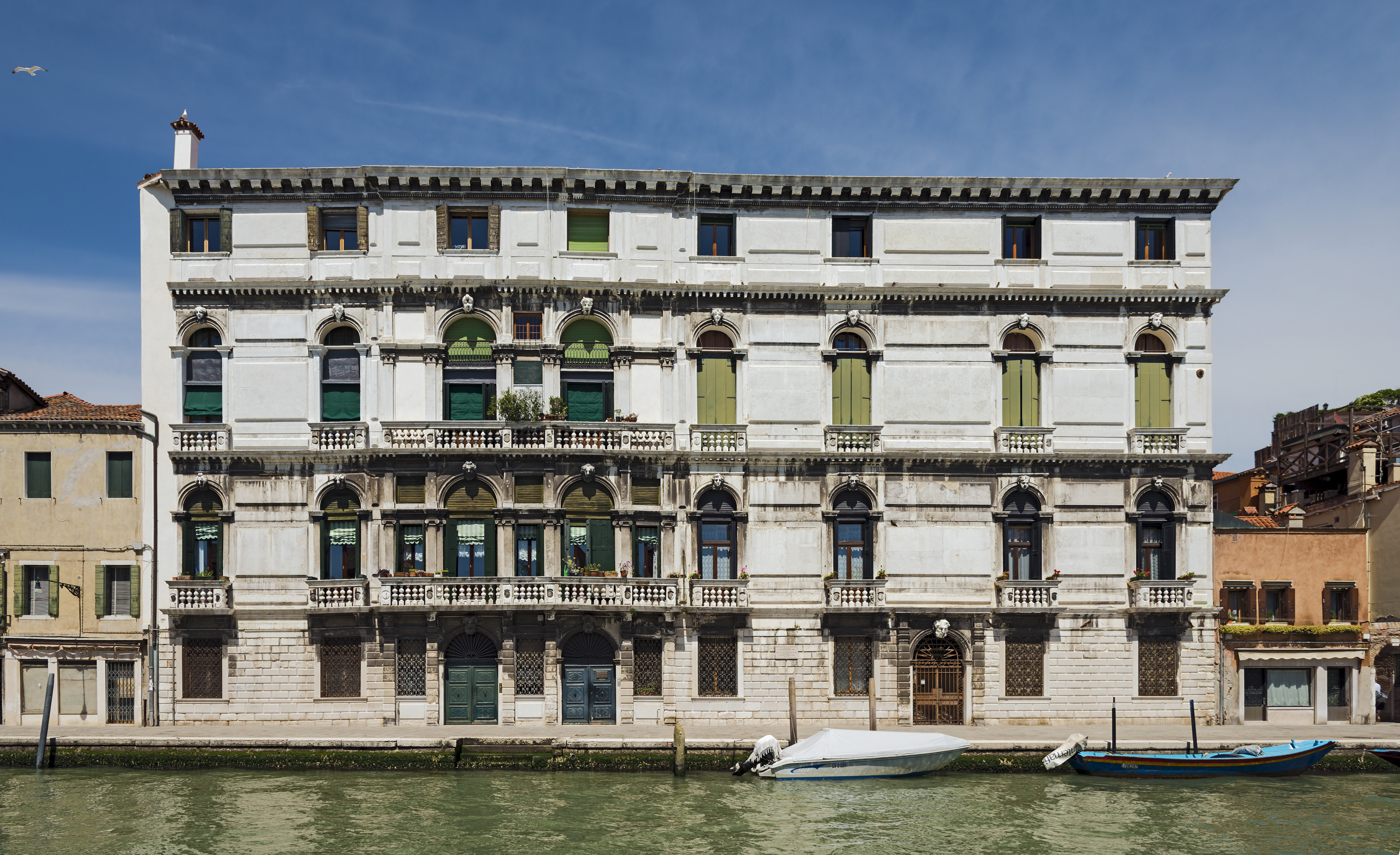
- Palazzo Surian Bellotto
- Interactive map of the Palazzo Surian Bellotto area

General information
- Type: Residential
- Architectural style: Baroque
- Location: Cannaregio district, Venice, Italy
- Coordinates: 45°26′44.52″N 12°19′17.76″E
- Construction stopped: 17th century

Technical details
- Floor count: 4 levels

Design and construction
- Architect: Giuseppe Sardi

Palazzo Surian Bellotto is a Baroque palace in Venice, Italy. The palazzo is located in the Cannaregio district and overlooks the Cannaregio Canal.

== History ==
This palace, one among the most imposing of the Cannaregio Canal, was built in the 17th century by the will of the patrician family of the Surians (of Armenian origin), to a project attributed to the architect Giuseppe Sardi, an author of the nearby Palazzo Savorgnan.

Towards the end of the same century, it was sold to the Bellotto family (of Brescia origin). In the 18th century, the palace became the seat of the French embassy; the philosopher Jean-Jacques Rousseau lived there in 1743–1744 and worked as a secretary to the ambassador, Comte de Mantaigu. In the 19th century, after the fall of the Republic of Venice, the palace began a long period of decay, during which the sumptuous interiors, their original structure and decorations were irreparably lost.

The palace is visible in the View of the Cannaregio Canal painted by Francesco Guardi around 1770.

Palazzo Surian Bellotto is currently one of the few historic buildings in Venice inhabited by Venetians. On the ground floor of the building from 9 December 2016, Laguna Libre, ecological and cultural restaurant, has come to life: after an important restoration according to green building principles, a large venue has been created which is both a restaurant with local high quality and organic products and the most important jazz & world music club in North Eastern Italy in collaboration with Veneto Jazz, as well as space for public and private events, also hosting art and photo exhibitions, books' presentations and public debates, in collaboration with NGOs and networks. Laguna Libre also hosts Smart Venice's headquarters, a research and consultancy company working on gender equality, inclusive innovation and sustainability projects.

On 2 December 2020 the well-known cultural broadcast of the France 3 channel of the French national television "Des Racines et des Ailes" aired the documentary "Notre-Dame, Chartres, Venise: chefs-d'oeuvre en renaissance". In the documentary the Palazzo Surian Bellotto with its history and the Laguna Libre with its cultural and gastronomic project represent one of the examples of the possible rebirth of the city after the high water in November 2019 and the Covid-19 Pandemic of 2020 / 2021.

An apartment of Palazzo Surian Bellotto is offered for sale.

== Architecture ==
The best preserved and most important part of palazzo is the large Baroque façade, which, with its high four floors, stands above the nearby buildings.

The facade is asymmetrical, having the central axis moved to the left; this is where the most valuable openings are located. On the ground floor of the short wing there are two arched portals decorated with mascarons inserted in rusticated bands. The pairs of serlianas on the two noble floors correspond to them. The seriana on the second floor is partially walled-up. All other openings are large single windows with stone frames recalling the motifs of the serlianas. The long wing also has a ground portal. All the windows on the noble floors are equipped with balustrades and mascarons. The fourth floor has a band of smaller rectangular windows.

The facade levels are underlined by elaborate string courses; the top terminates with a dentiled cornice.

== Gallery ==
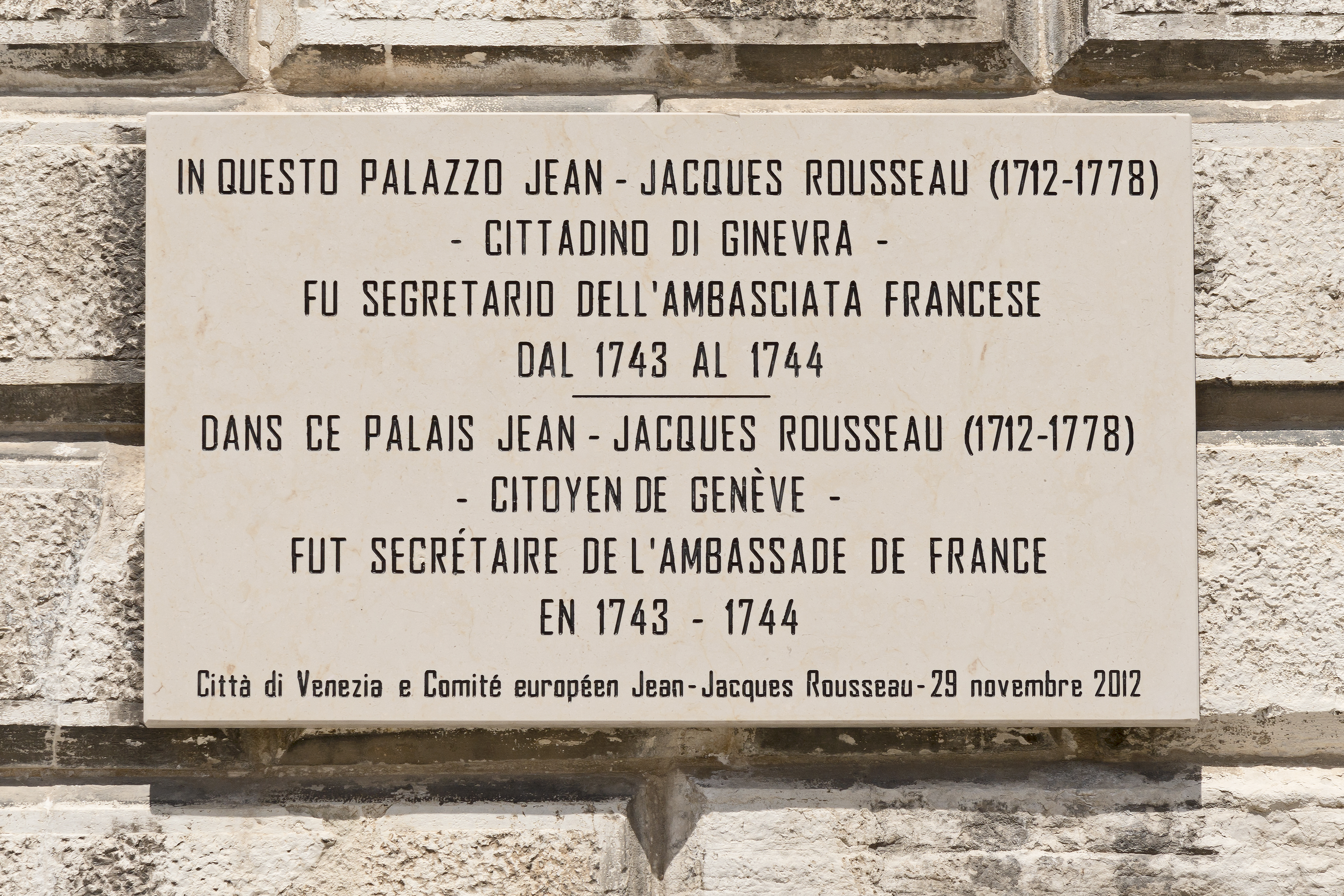
Commemorative plaque of Jean Jacques Rousseau on the facade

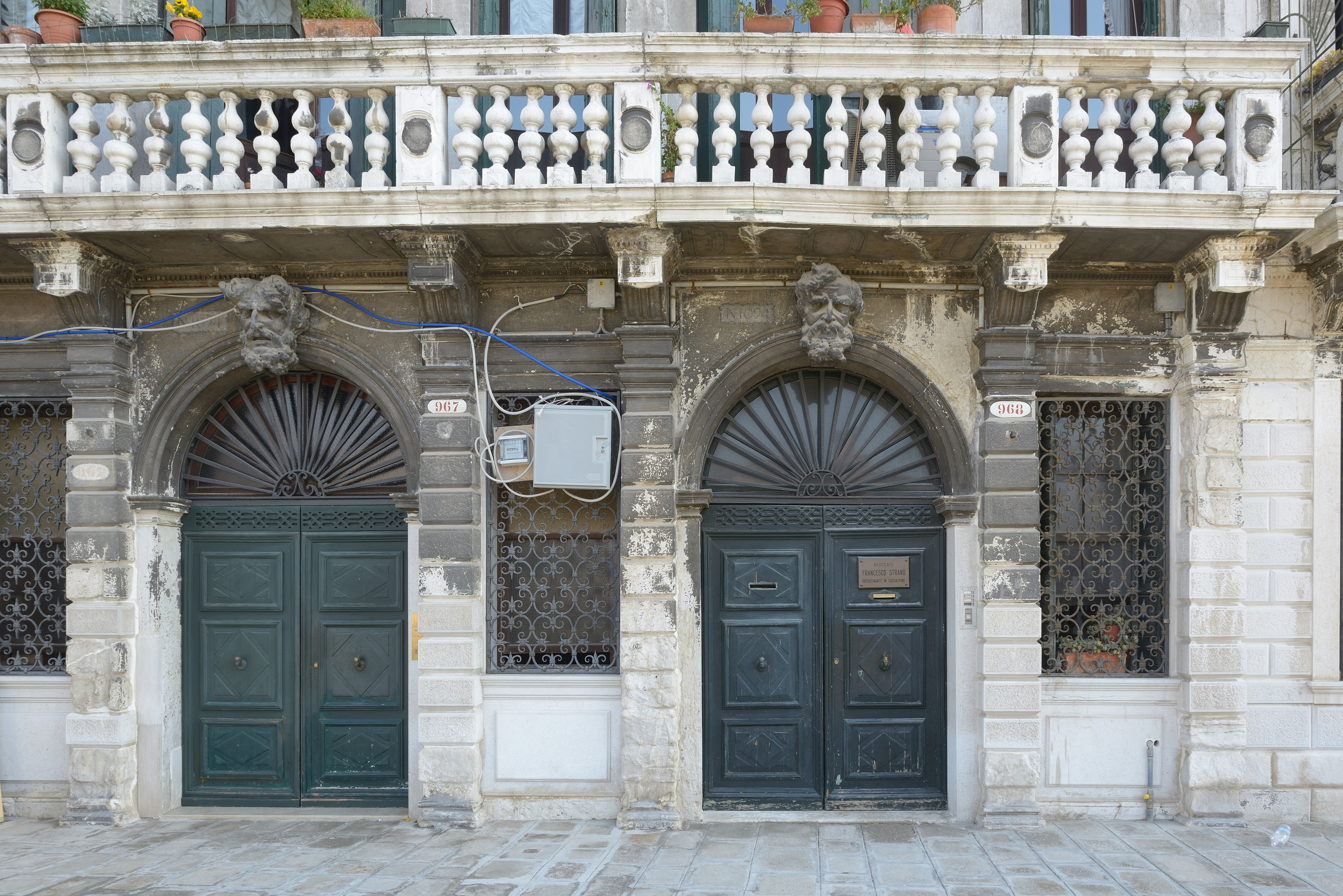
Detail of the facade on the Cannaregio Canal

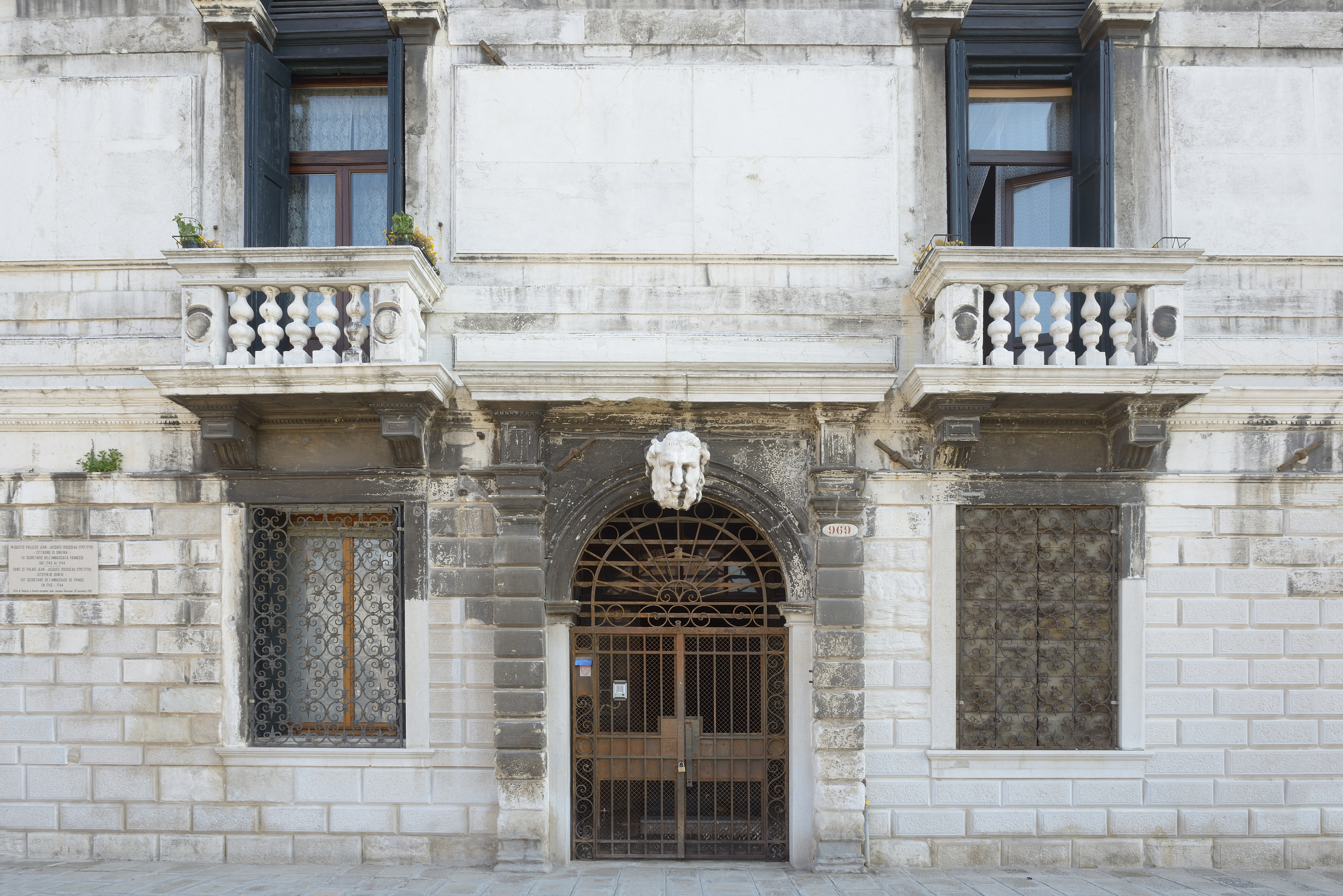
Ground floor portal

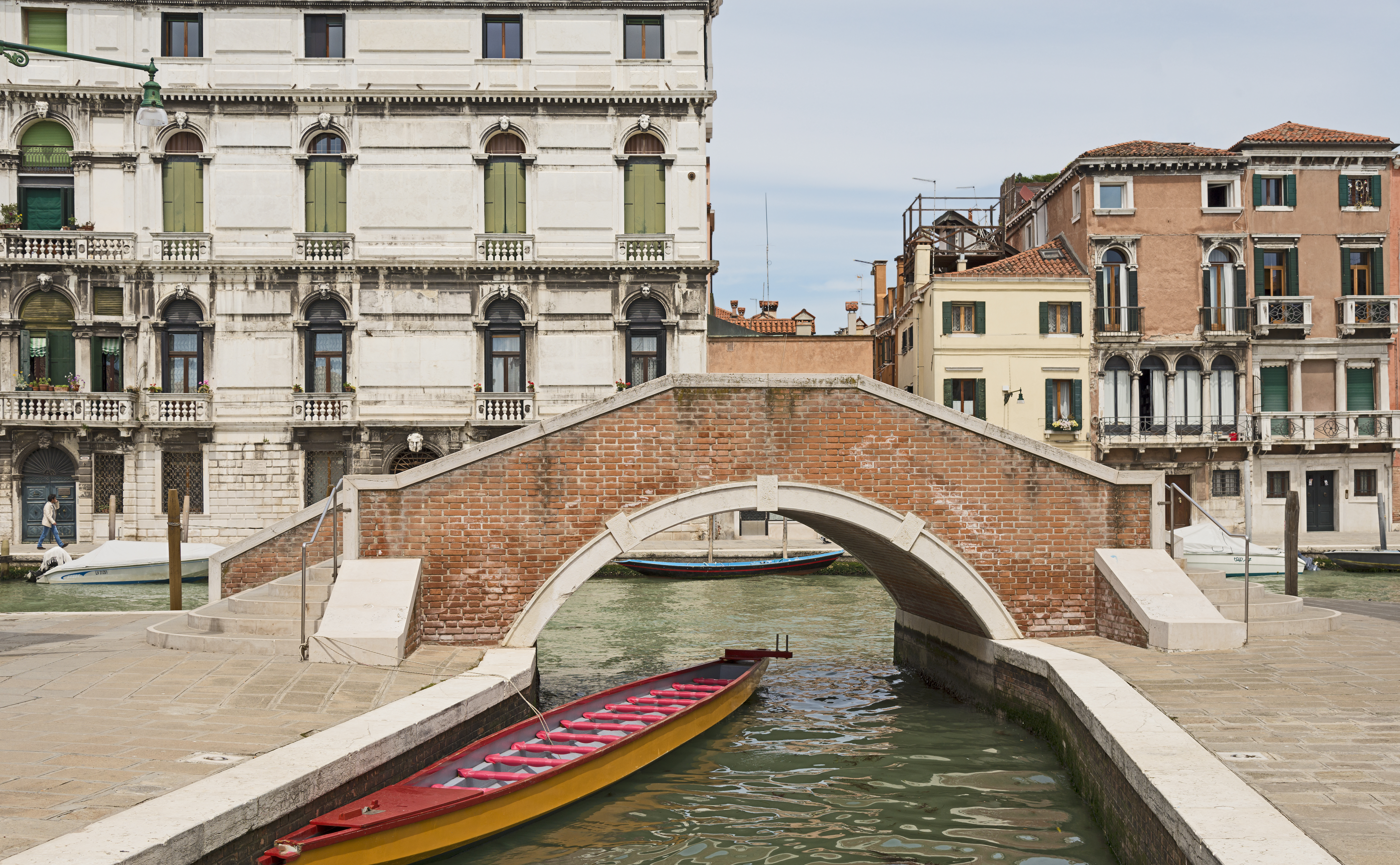
Bridge Ponte de la Crea, on Rio de la Crea

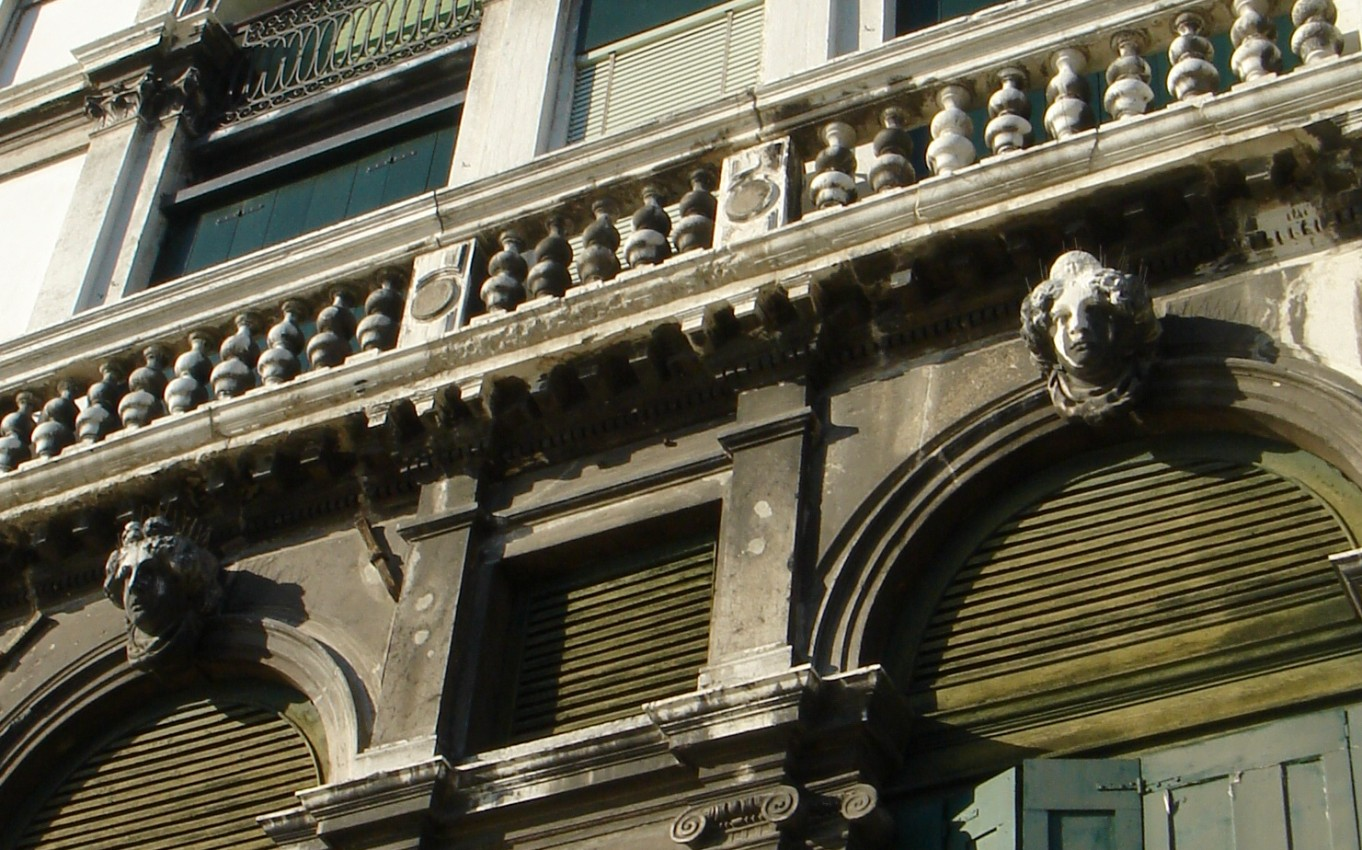
Mascarones and balustrades
