= Marco Basaiti =

Italian painter (c. 1470 – 1530)

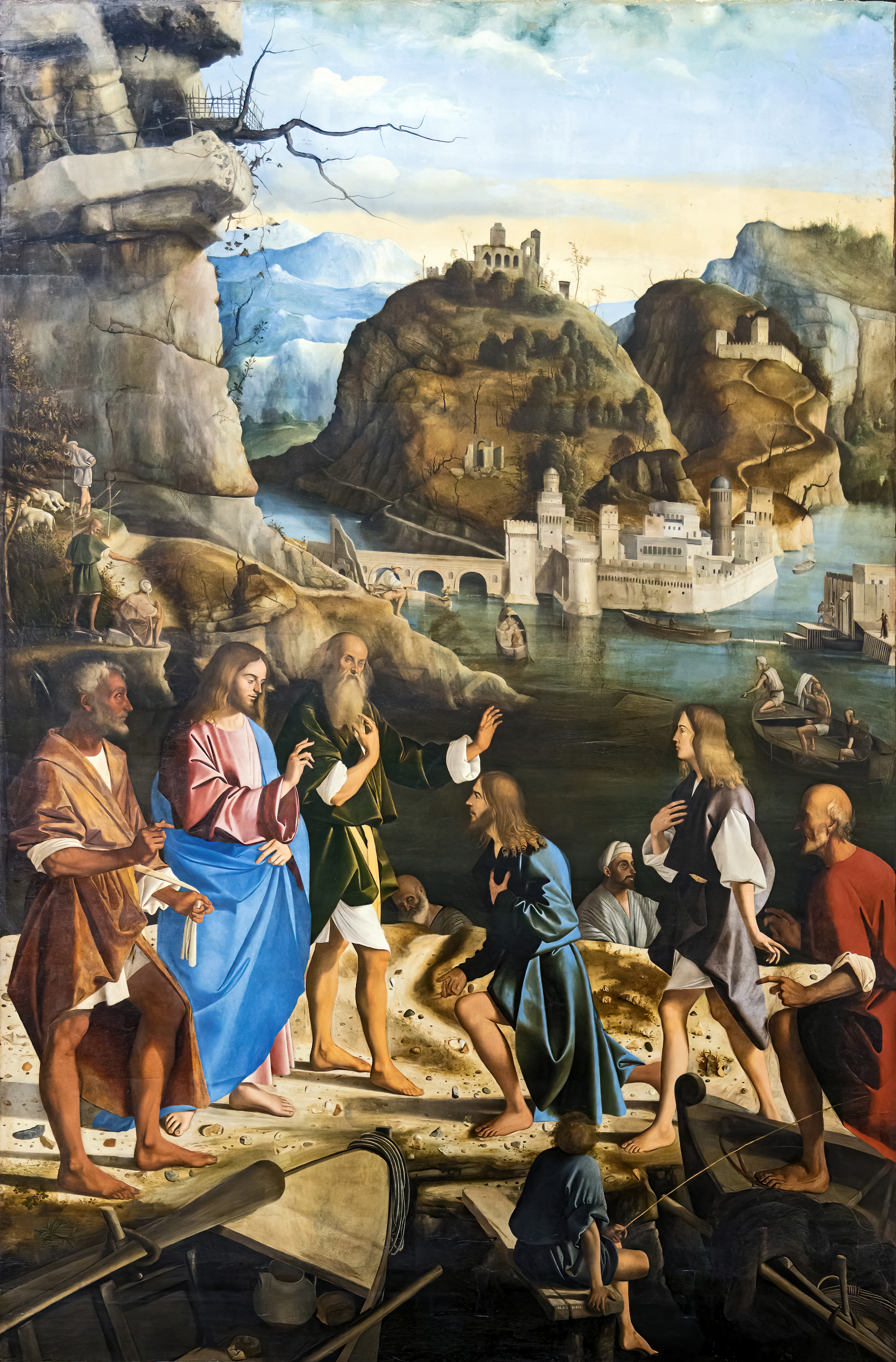
Call of the Sons of Zebedee, 1510

Marco Basaiti (c. 1470 – 1530) was a Venetian painter of the Renaissance who worked mainly in Venice and was a contemporary of Giovanni Bellini and Cima da Conegliano. He has been referred to by several names including Marco Baxaiti, Marcus Basitus, and Marcus Baxiti. (Vasari believed that Marco Basarini and Marco Basaiti were two artists, but later information reveals that these two were in fact the same painter.) There is little documentation on Marco Basaiti besides his painting signatures and a guild's ledger of 1530 that records him as a painter of figures.

His works are mainly portraits and religious subjects. There is no known painting attributed to Marco Basaiti with a mythological theme. Although trained in the quattrocento style, Basaiti's career began right at the beginning of the cinquecento style which forced him to attempt to adapt his style to stay current.

== Personal life, training, and influence ==
Marco Basaiti was born around 1470, in either Venice or Friuli. His family was of either of Albanian or possibly Greek origin, as Vasari reported. In either case this explains the variety of names Basaiti is known by because the Greek and Albanian communities, and other foreign communities, for the most part kept to themselves and do not often appear on Venetian records. A will dated 1526 may provide evidence of his family, but the connection between Basaiti and this will is debated. Due to this lack of documentation, not much is known about Basaiti's life, except what scholars can learn about the artist through his art.

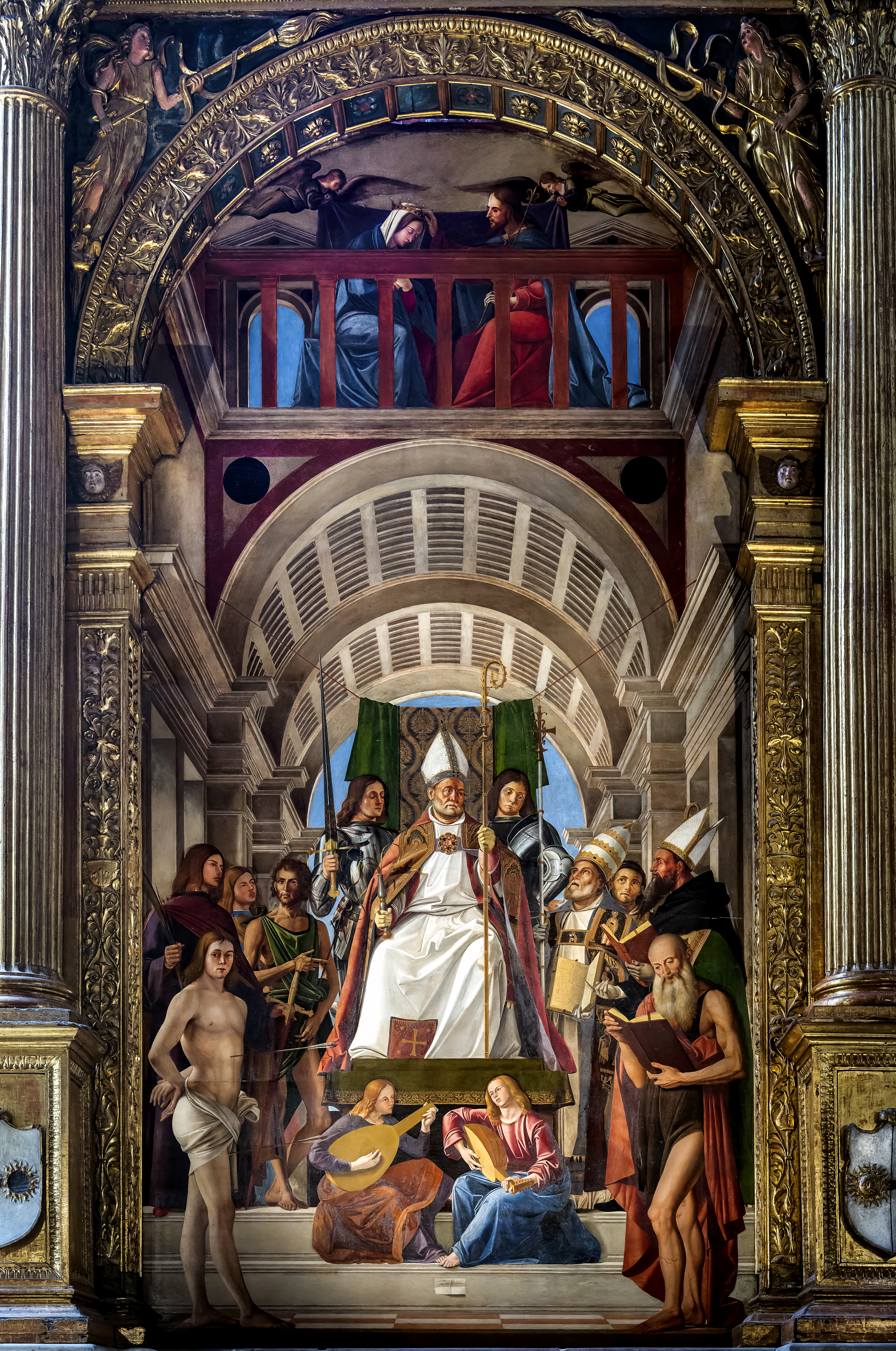
Altarpiece of Saint Ambrose, Alvise Vivarini and Marco Basaiti, 1503

There is evidence that Basaiti trained with Bartolomeo Vivarini as Basaiti's earlier pieces are thought to reflect Bartolomeo's style and composition. After Bartolomeo died in the late 1490s, it is thought that Basaiti began working with Alvise Vivarini, Bartolomeo's nephew. This is supported by the fact that when Alvise died in 1505, Basaiti was commissioned to finish the altar piece entitled St. Ambrose Enthroned with Saints that Alvise had left uncompleted. Typically only major assistants working in the studio would have been asked to do this type of work which suggests that Basaiti was closely connected to Alvise by this time. Additionally, Basaiti's work seems to be influenced stylistically by both Vivarinis, further implying the link between Basaiti and these two masters.

Basaiti was influenced by a variety of great artists that lived during this era. For example, he began to incorporate more extensive landscapes into his backgrounds, taking inspiration from Giovanni Bellini. In fact, some of Bellini’s older works were misattributed to Basaiti for a long period of time. Another likely influence for Basaiti’s more complex backgrounds is the work of Netherlandish painters. Specifically, it has been noted that after Albrecht Dürer’s stay in Venice, Basaiti’s style shifted somewhat towards more complex and dramatic landscapes with less of an emphasis on the figures in the painting. This style can be seen in the Lamentation over the Dead Christ and St. Jerome in the Wilderness. The latter is thought to be a copy of a painting by Cima da Conegliano which presents yet one more important artistic influence in Marco Basaiti’s life. For the most part Basaiti focused on religious themes rarely delving into mythological or historical topics. Despite this his style seems fairly contemporary with complex composition and correct proportions.

== Early period (1495–1510) ==
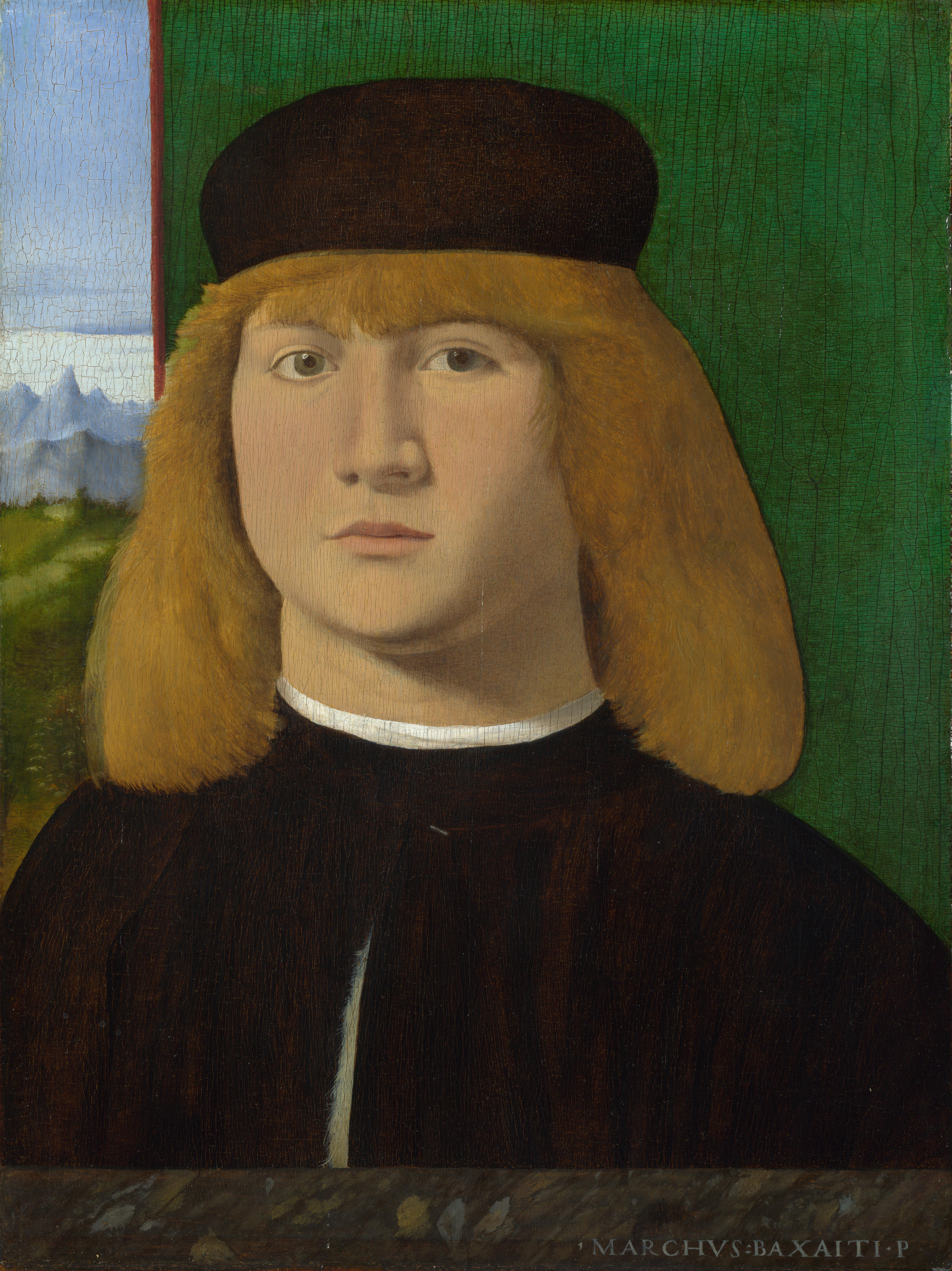
Portrait of a Young Man, 1495

More than half of Basaiti's known works come from this first period in his painting career. This period comes right after his training and is marked by a constantly changing style as Basaiti experiments with his art to find his own personal style. This era is marked by the Portrait of a Young Man (1495) which represents his first finished piece as an independent painter.

Stylistically there are strong influences from his two proposed mentors in the composition of his paintings, with Bartolomeo specifically influencing his figure design. Notable features of the Antonellian include strong geometric forms and sharp contrast in lighting. Furthermore, in accordance with the style of his proposed masters, Basaiti’s paintings often feature brightly colored clothing and cool skin tones. Indeed, Basaiti’s early works are very like some of Alvise’s established disciples such as Jacopo da Valenza which further confirms the link between Basaiti and Alvise.

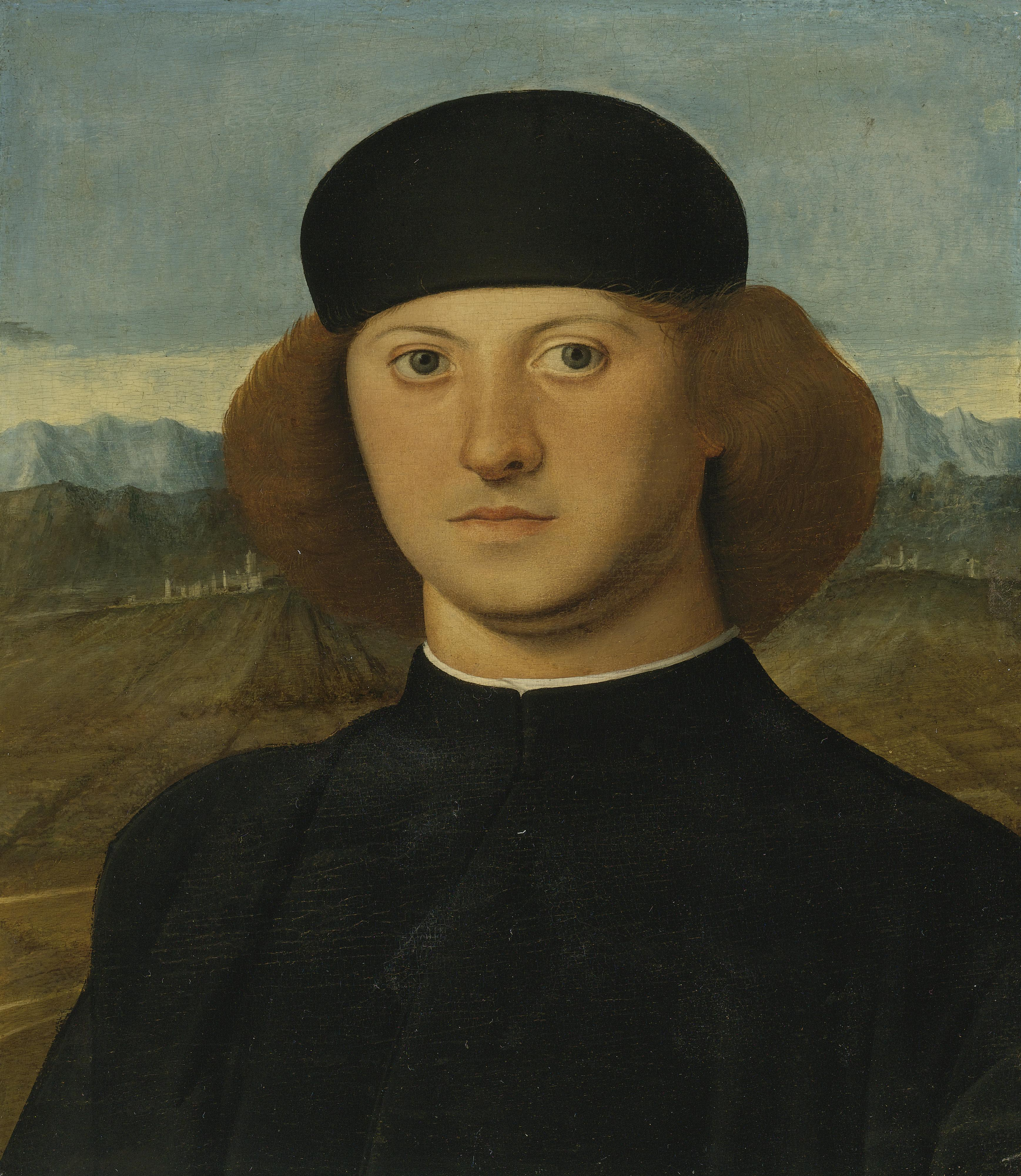
Portrait of a Young Man, 1505

Around 1500, the influence of the Antonellian school becomes less distinct. Basaiti’s backgrounds become more developed demonstrating the influence of Giovanni Bellini and Northern artists. This development can be seen in paintings such as in Portrait of a Young Man (1505), where, in contrast to his first Portrait of a Young Man (1495), the screen behind the figure has been completely removed and the landscape given more importance. In addition to developing a more complex landscape composition, Basaiti appears to become more concerned with spatial consistency after 1500.

This change to more expressive landscapes coincided with Albrecht Dürer's stay in Venice during 1505–1506. It has been suggested that the landscape style Basaiti adopted is more influenced by Netherlandish paintings than by Bellini.

As Basaiti continued to mix the styles of Alvise and Bellini his paintings become comparable to Cima da Conegliano. However, Basaiti arrived at this mix of styles after Cima and he was never able to exert the same influence.

== Middle period (1510–1520) ==
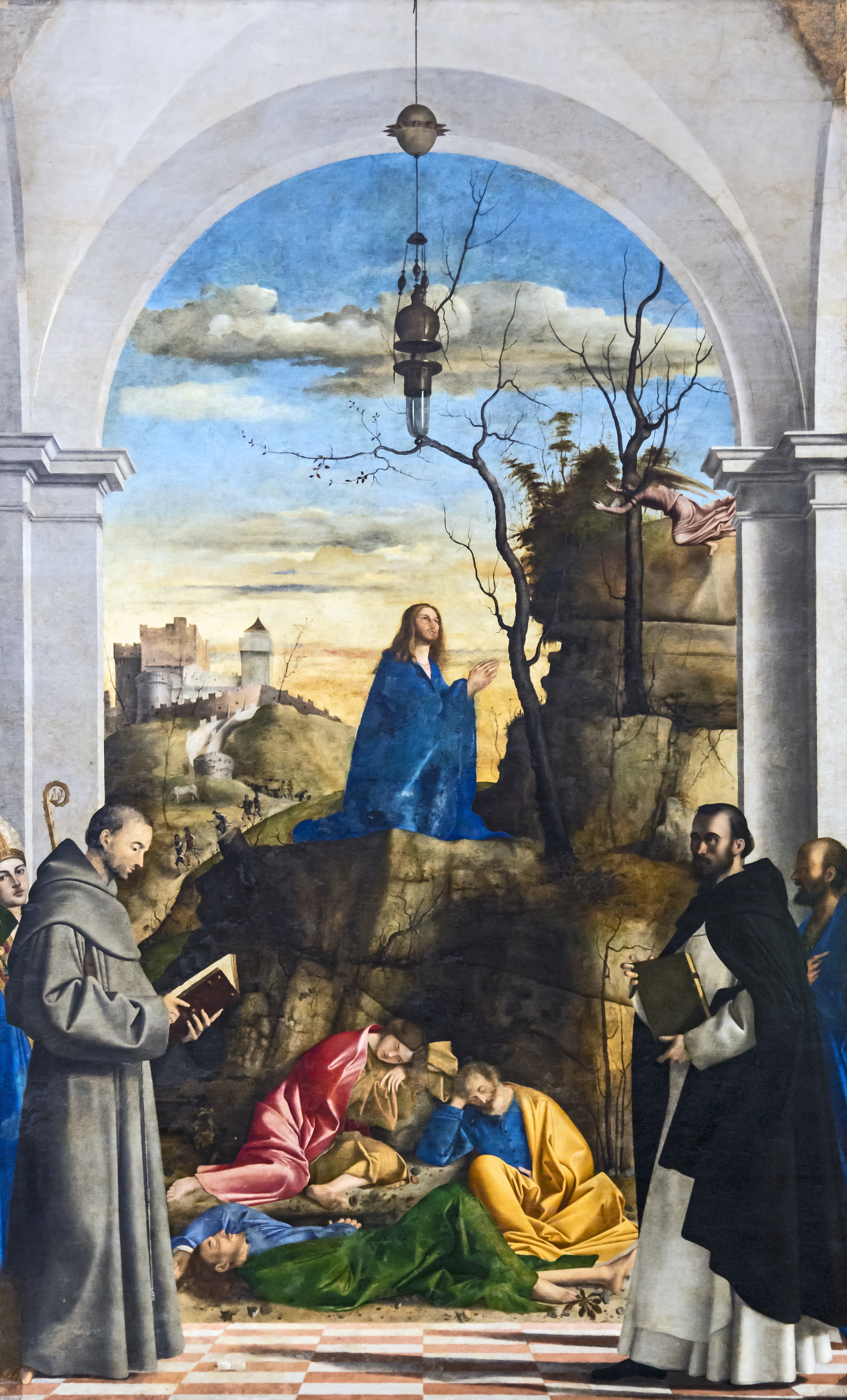
Agony in the Garden, 1510–1516

This period represents the most cohesive time stylistically for Basaiti's paintings. It was a prosperous decade for Basaiti and included several large commissions such as the high altarpiece at Sant'Andrea della Certosa, the Call of the Sons of Zebedee. This piece in particular marked the beginning of his mature period and is considered by Vasari and many later critics to be one of his best pieces. Unlike the portraits which up until now had been his main artistic endeavors, the Calling of the Sons of Zebedee is a narrative painting which requires more complex composition, and features a detailed and expansive landscape. Although Basaiti tried to compose narrative paintings later on, none were as successful as this first one.

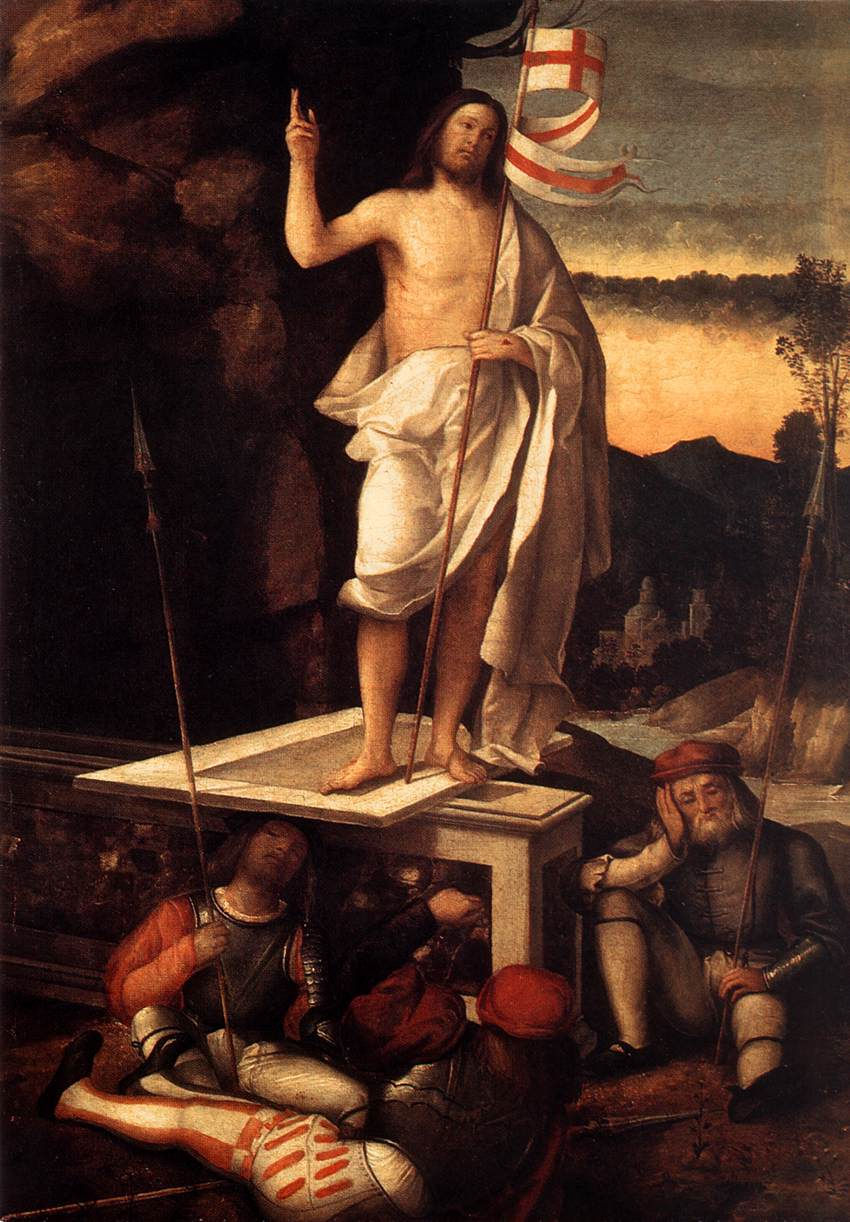
Resurrection of Christ, 1520

Another notable example of Basaiti’s work with narrative pieces is the Agony of Christ. This represents a large commission as the altarpiece of the Foscari in San Giobbe. This altarpiece is set up next similar pieces by Giovanni Bellini and the influence from Bellini in Basaiti's painting is obvious.

Later, during this period, Basaiti’s paintings became more focused and returned to one-figure paintings as intricacies of narrative paintings proved to be too difficult. As seen in the Resurrected Christ and the Blessed Redeemer, while many aspects of Basaiti’s former success remain, the painting features only one main figure.

Continuing his emphasis on the use of landscapes in paintings, backgrounds became more integrated into the overall painting but the influence of Bellini and of Netherlandish painters is still apparent. As Basaiti’s style developed, the light in his pictures became softer and the components of the painting blended more fluidly. This gradual shift towards softer lines and an emphasis on natural lighting was the popular style developing during this era. The quattrocento style in which Basaiti was trained was declining in popularity, and his attempts to incorporate some of the new techniques can be seen particularly in his later works.

== Late period ( 1520–1530) ==
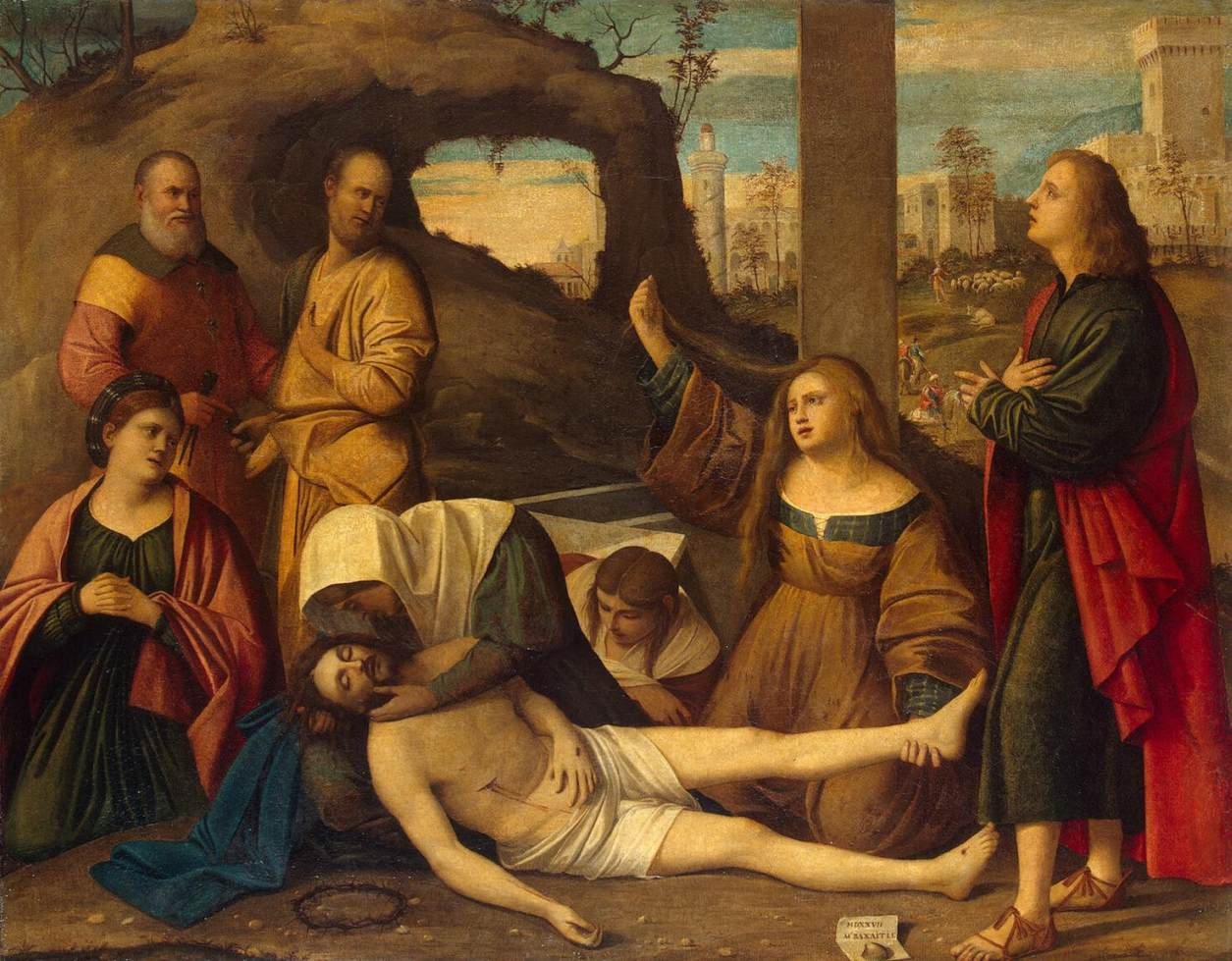
Lamentation, 1527

This was Basaiti's last period and no paintings have been dated after 1530. Basaiti appears on a ledger for a painters guild in 1530 but there is no known mention of him after this ledger and he is presumed to have died in the early years of that decade. According to current estimations, this would have made him 60 around the time of his death. In this last decade of his painting career, his composition became slightly more developed and more in tune with the contemporary style but remained heavily influenced by the quattrocento style. During this time he mainly focused on portraits, which were the area where he was best able to adapt his style to the changing times. Landscapes started to decline in importance in his paintings although their presence never disappeared completely.

One exception to this trend is the painting The Lamentation which once again demonstrates Basaiti's ability to compose narrative scenes. The Lamentation blends many of the influences throughout Basaiti's life and exhibits his progress towards more organic lighting and forms.

Some call Basaiti one of the last masters of the early Renaissance and his works demonstrate a refined quattrocento style. However, despite his best efforts, his works are still generally considered to be one step behind the trends of the Venetian painting of that time.

== Works ==
There are approximately 30 known pieces currently attributed to Basaiti.

| Date attributed | Painting | Location | Type |
| 1495–1500 | Portrait of a Young Man | National Gallery London | Oil on panel |
| 1496–1505 | The Virgin and Child | National Gallery London | Oil on panel |
| 1500 | Portrait of a Gentleman | RISD Museum, Providence, Rhode Island | Oil on panel |
| 1500 | Saint Catherine of Alexandria | Szépmüvészeti Múzeum, Budapest | Oil on panel |
| 1500–1501 | Virgin and Child with Saint James the Great | Philadelphia Museum of Art | Oil on panel |
| 1500–1505 | Portrait of Doge Agostino Barbarigo | Szépmüvészeti Múzeum, Budapest | Oil on panel |
| 1500–1510 | Madonna and Child with Saint Chiara and Saint Francis | Academia Carrara | Oil on panel |
| 1500–1510 | Portrait of a Man in a Cap | Museo Correr, Venice | Tempera on panel |
| 1501–1502 | Madonna and Child with a Donor | Location unknown | Tempera on panel |
| 1503 | Altarpiece of Saint Ambrose | Frari Basilica | Oil on panel |
| 1505 | Portrait of a Young Man | Private collection | Oil on panel |
| 1508 | The Deposition | Alte Pinakothek, Bayerische Staatsgemäldesammlungen | Oil on panel |
| 1508 | Virgin and Child with Saints | Fitzwilliam Museum, University of Cambridge | Tempera on panel |
| 1510 | The Call of the Sons of Zebedee | Galleria dell Accademia, Venice | Oil on panel |
| 1510 | Dead Christ | Szépmüvészeti Múzeum, Budapest | Oil on panel |
| 1510 | Madonna and Child | Georgia Museum of Art, Athens Georgia | Oil on panel |
| 1510–1516 | Christ Praying in the Garden (Agony in the Garden) | Galleria dell'Accademia, Venice | Oil on panel |
| 1515–1516 | Portrait of a Gentleman with a Cap | Academia Carrara | Oil on panel |
| 1517 | Blessed Redeemer | Academia Carrara | Oil on panel |
| 1518–1519 | Madonna and Child with Saint John the Baptist and Saint Liberalis | Muzeum Palacu Krola Jana III w Wilanowie, Warsaw | Oil on panel |
| 1520 | Madonna Adoring the Child | National Gallery of Art, Washington | Oil on panel |
| 1520 | The Resurrection of Christ | Accademia Carrara | Oil on canvas |
| 1521 | Portrait of a Gentleman in Black | Academia Carrara | Oil on panel |
| 1527 | The Lamentation | The State Hermitage Museum, St. Petersburg | Oil on canvas |
| No date given on website | Head of the Virgin | Ashmolean Museum of Art and Archaeology, University of Oxford | Oil on panel |
| No date | The Lamentation of Dead Christ | Museum of Fine Arts, Boston | Oil on panel |
| No date | Saint Peter Enthroned with Four Saints | San Pietro di Castello | Oil on canvas |
| No date | Saint Sebastian | Santa Maria della Salute, Venice | Oil on canvas |
| No date | San Girolamo | Museo Correr, Venice | Oil on panel |
| No date | Dead Christ between Two Angels | Galleria dell'Accademia, Venice | Oil on panel |
| No Date | Penitent Saint Jerome | Musée des Beaux-Arts, Strasbourg | Oil on panel |

The table is ordered by date and those with a range of dates were ordered based on their earliest estimated date. Those with no determined dates were listed last.
