= San Giobbe =

Church in Venice

Church of Saint Job, Venice
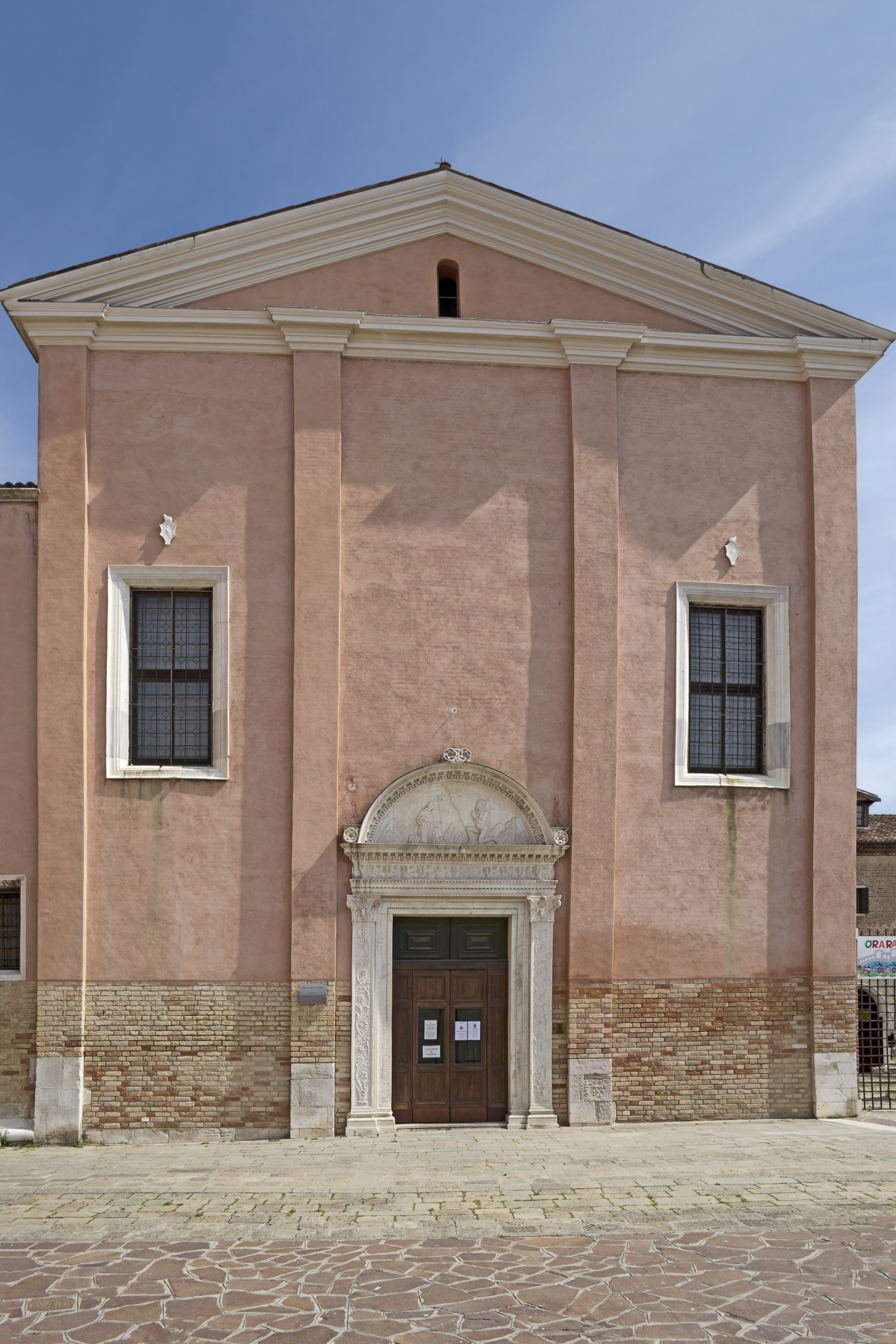
- Facade of the church

- Location within Venice Location within Italy

Religion
- Affiliation: Roman Catholic
- Year consecrated: 1493
- Status: Active

Location
- Location: Cannaregio, Venice, Italy
- Coordinates: 45°26′42.1″N 12°19′13.16″E

Architecture
- Architects: Antonio Gambello, Pietro Lombardo
- Type: Church
- Style: Renaissance
- Groundbreaking: 1450
- Completed: 1493

Specifications
- Length: 42 metres (138 ft)
- Width: 20 metres (66 ft)

The Church of St Job (Italian: Chiesa di San Giobbe) is a 15th-century Roman Catholic church located overlooking the campo of the same name, known as Sant'Agiopo in Venetian dialect, on the south bank of the Cannaregio canal near Ponte dei Tre Archi in the sestiere of Cannaregio of Venice, northern Italy,

== History ==
The church is dedicated to Saint Job. It is one of the five votive churches built in Venice after an onset of plague.

In 1378 a hospice with a small oratory dedicated to San Giobbe or Saint Job attached was begun on this site by Giovanni Contarini, on land he owned near his house. It was completed by his daughter Lucia, with the help of the Minor Observant Friars. The oratory was replaced by the present church by Bernardino of Siena, with the financial backing of doge Cristoforo Moro in gratitude for Bernardino's prophecy that Moro would become doge - Cristoforo donated 10,000 ducats to the building works in 1471, three months before his death, and was buried in the church. Work began in 1450, paused until 1470, and was finally consecrated in 1493, as one of the first examples of Renaissance architecture in the city. It was begun by Antonio Gambello and (when work began again in 1470) completed by the sculptor and architect Pietro Lombardo, with the latter designing the present altar arch and main door as well as much of the interior decoration.

It contains the tomb of René de Voyer de Paulmy d'Argenson, French ambassador to the Republic of Venice, by the French sculptors Claude Perreau and Thomas Blanchet. Its altarpieces house works by Vivarini, Pietro Lombardo, Luca Della Robbia, Basaiti and Bordone, as well as Girolamo Savoldo's Il Presepio (1540). The church also formerly held Giovanni Bellini's San Giobbe Altarpiece and Vittore Carpaccio's The Presentation of Jesus in the Temple: these works are now in the Gallerie dell'Accademia.

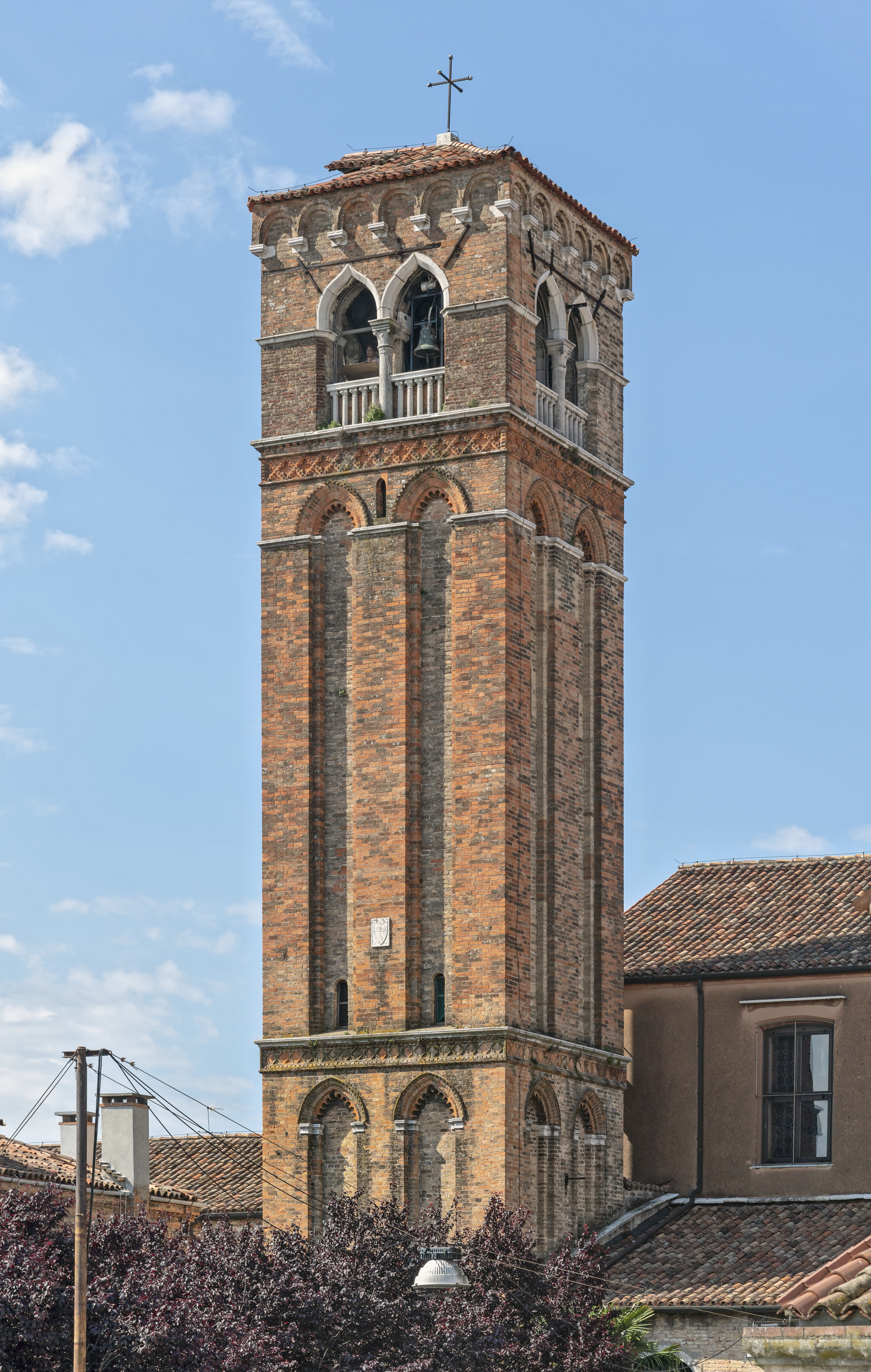
Bell tower

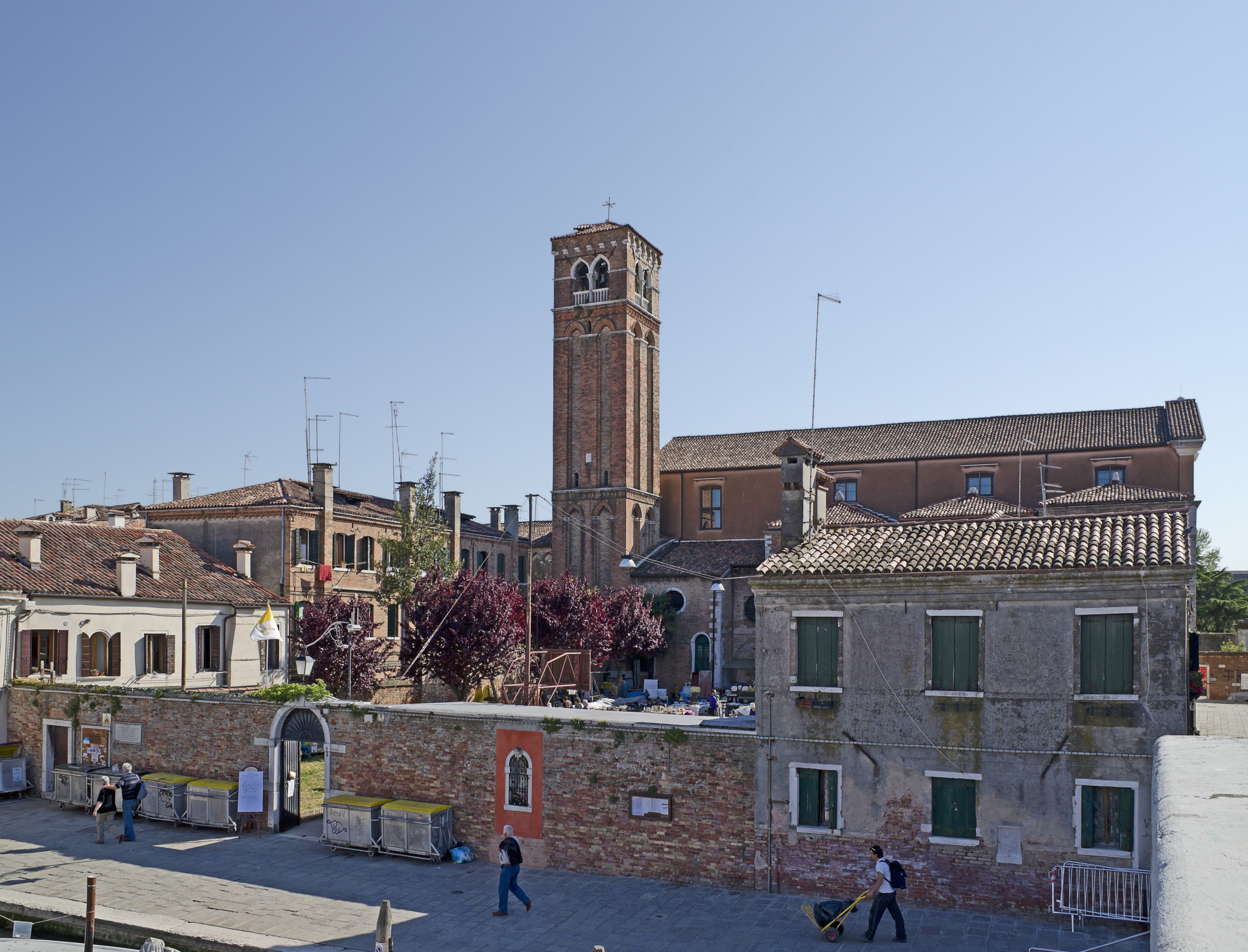
San Giobbe view from Ponte dei Tre Archi

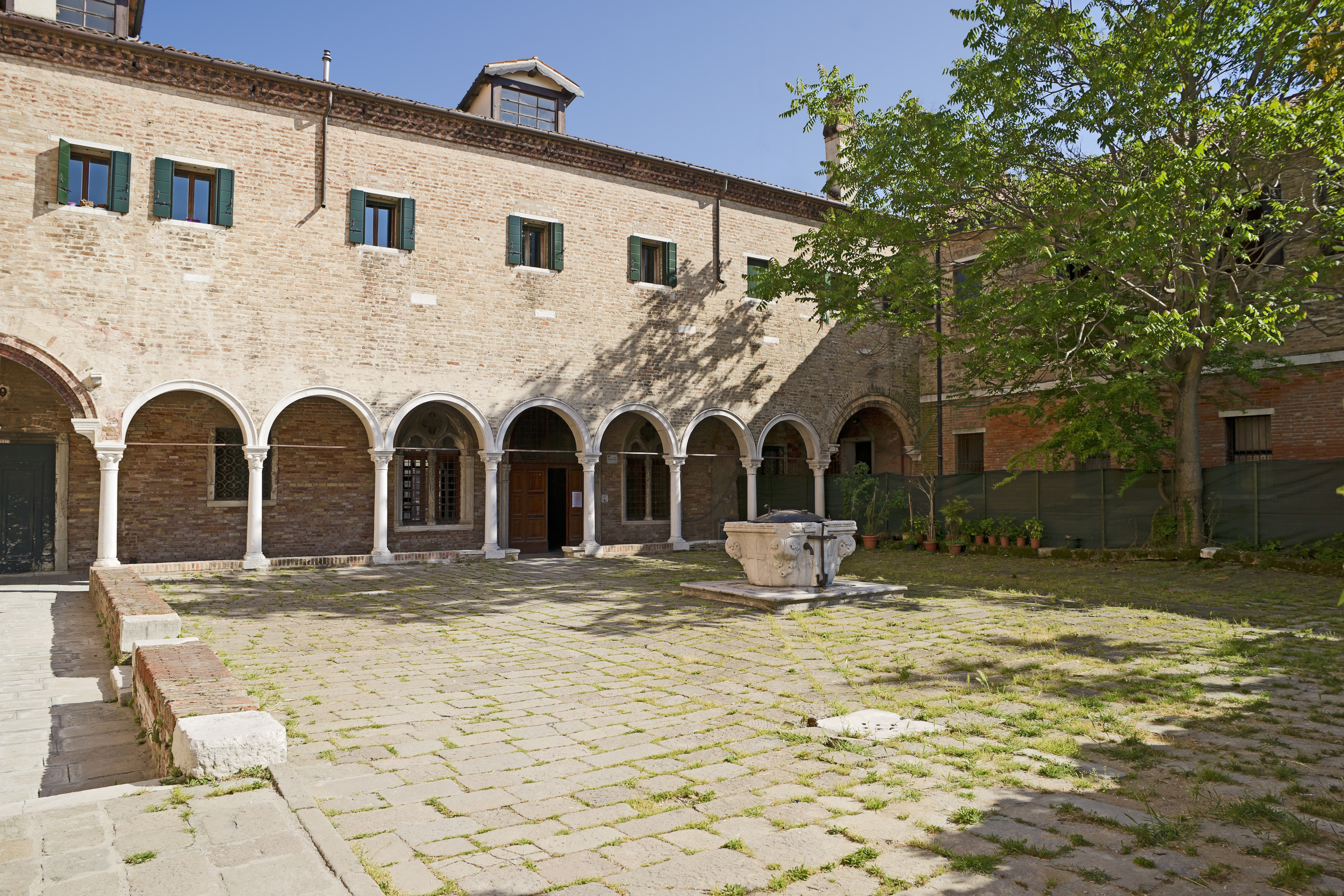
the cloister

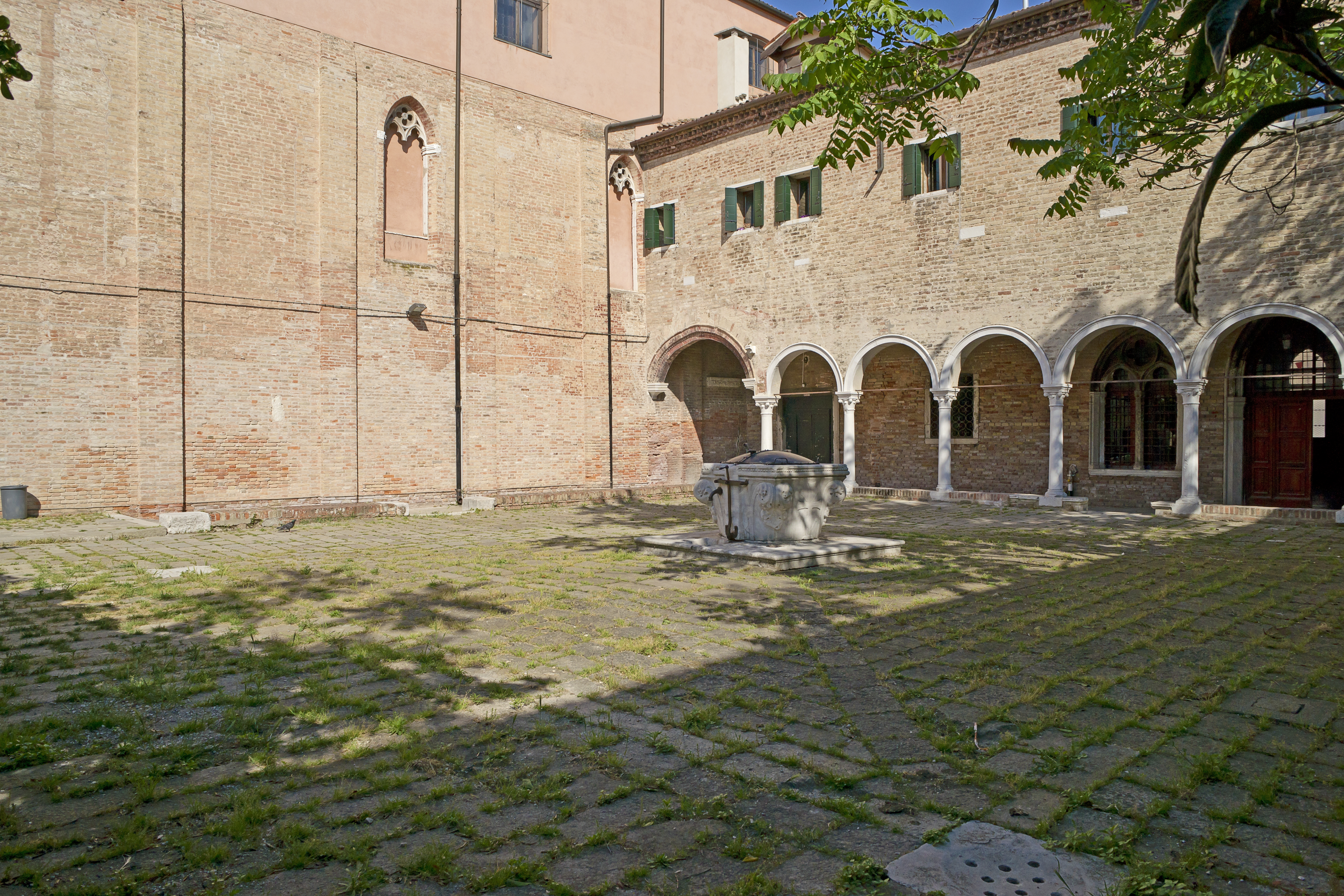
the cloister

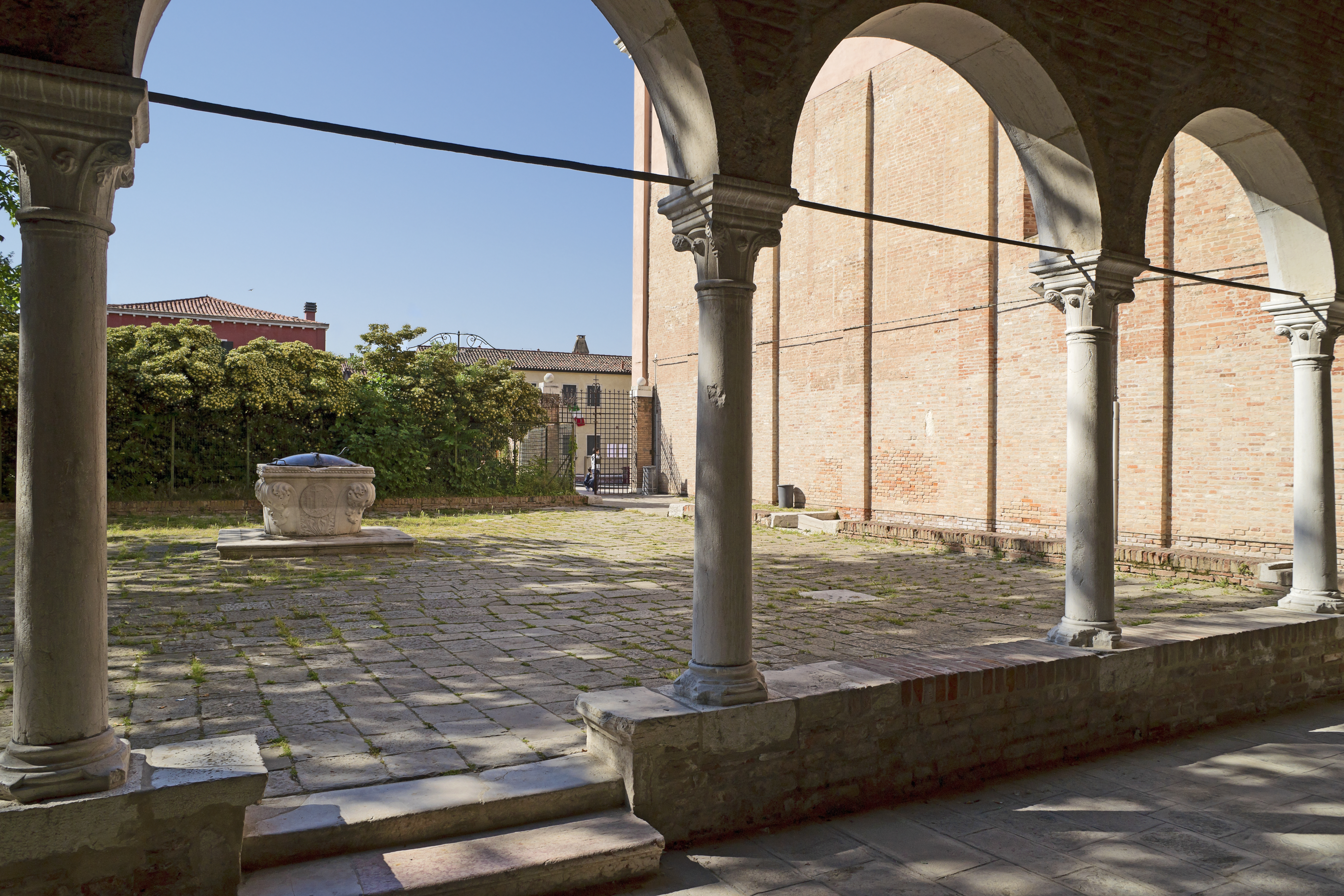
The cloister

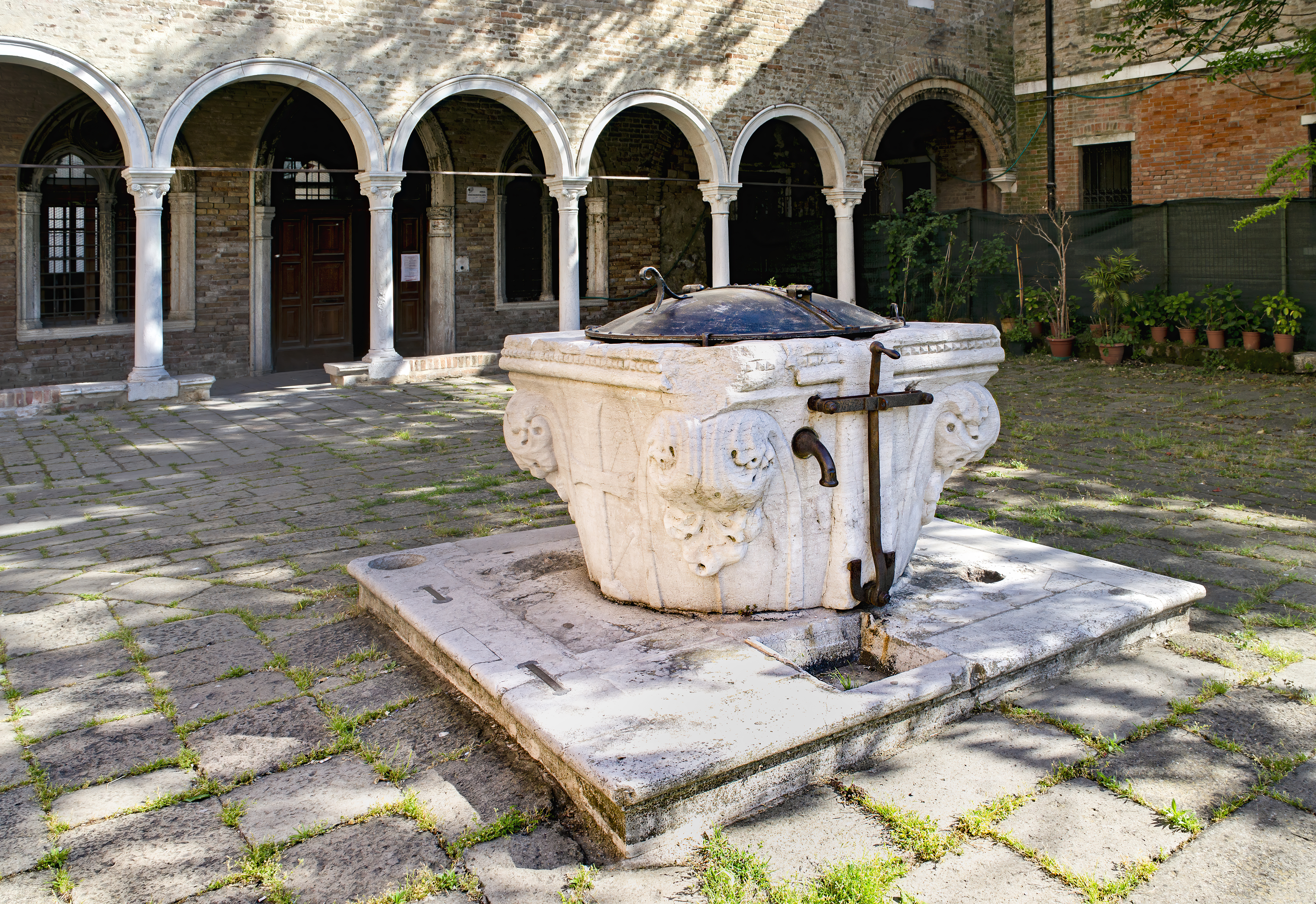
Well in cloister

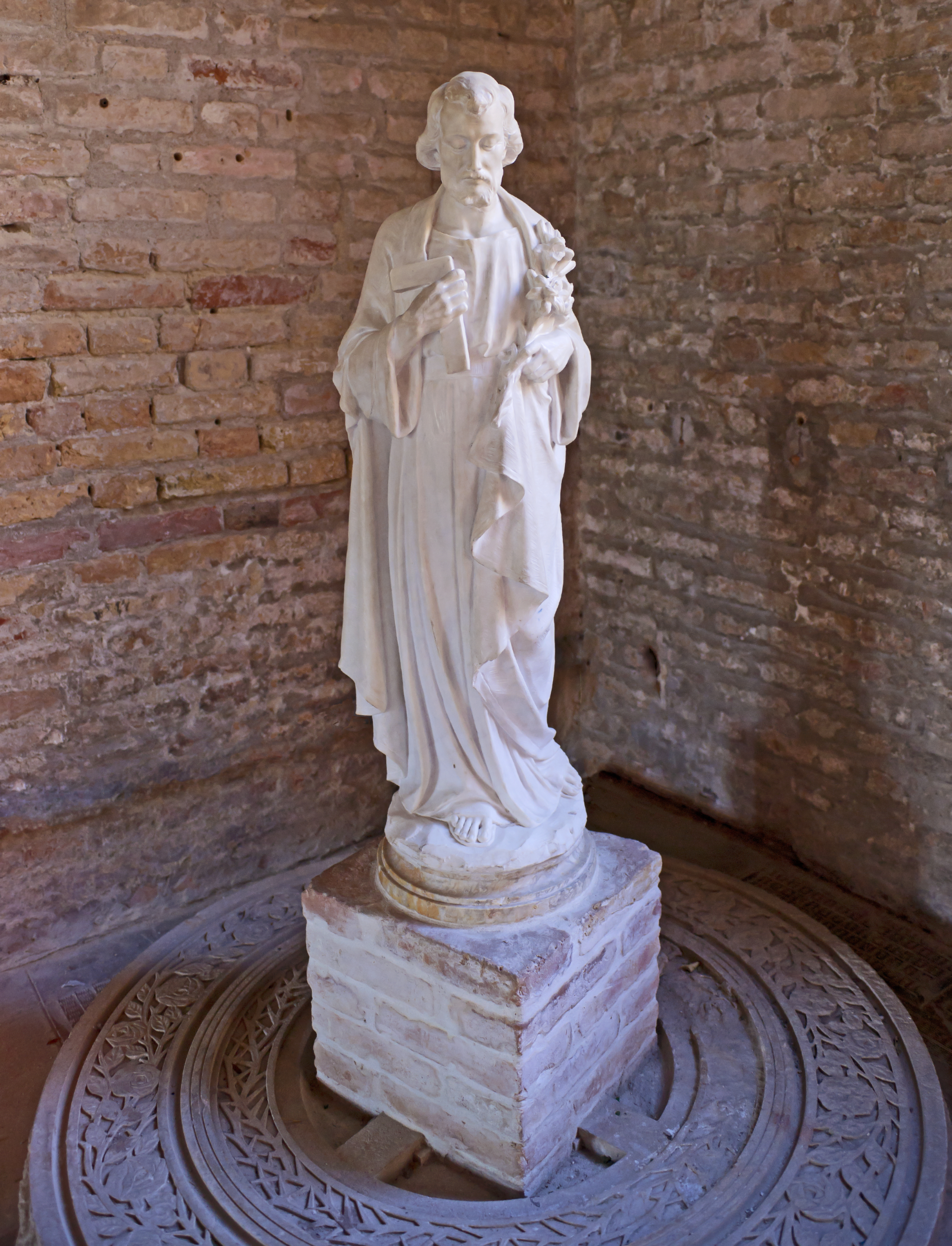
Statue of St Job

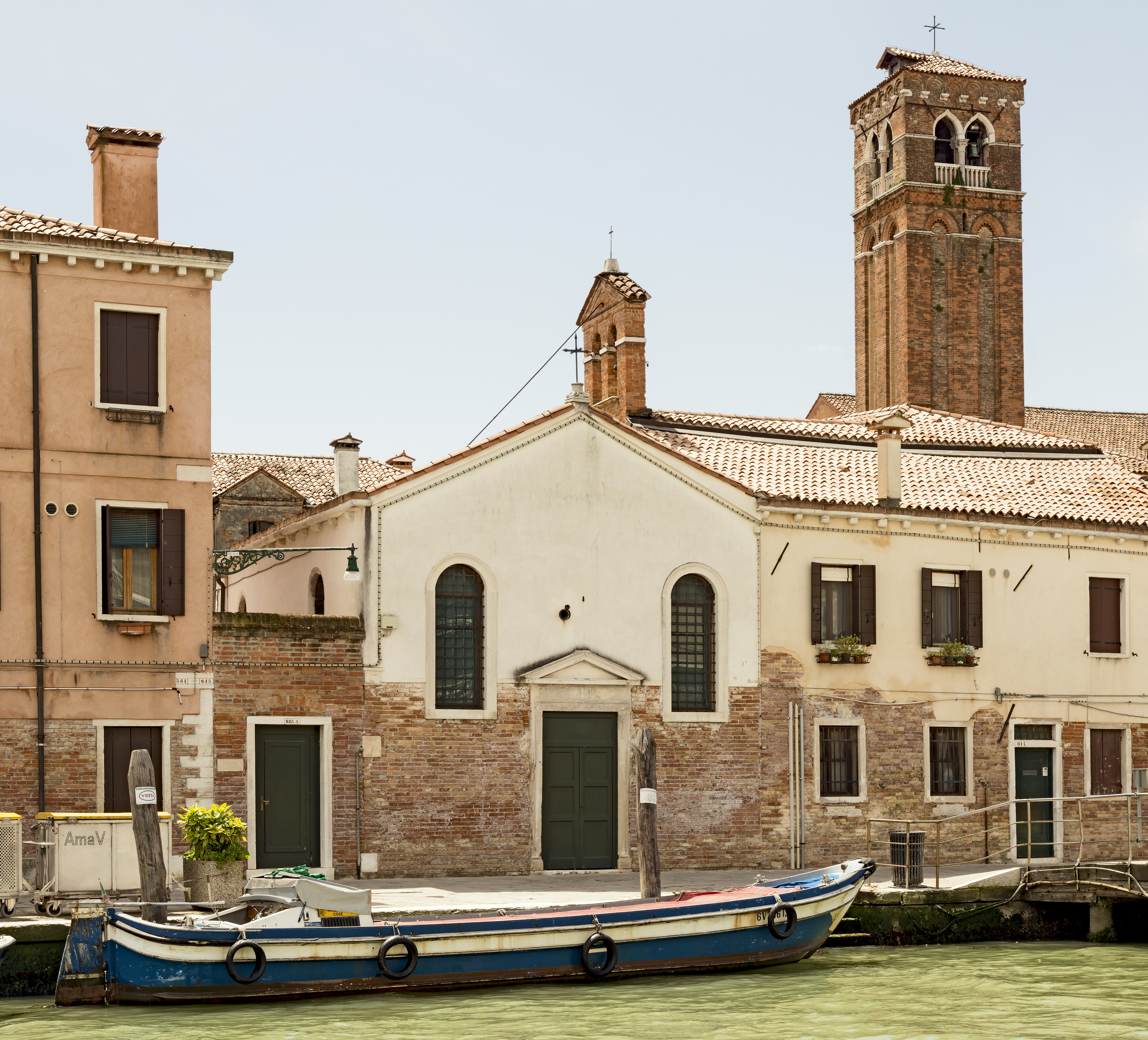
The oratory of the 'Ospedale di San Giobbe'
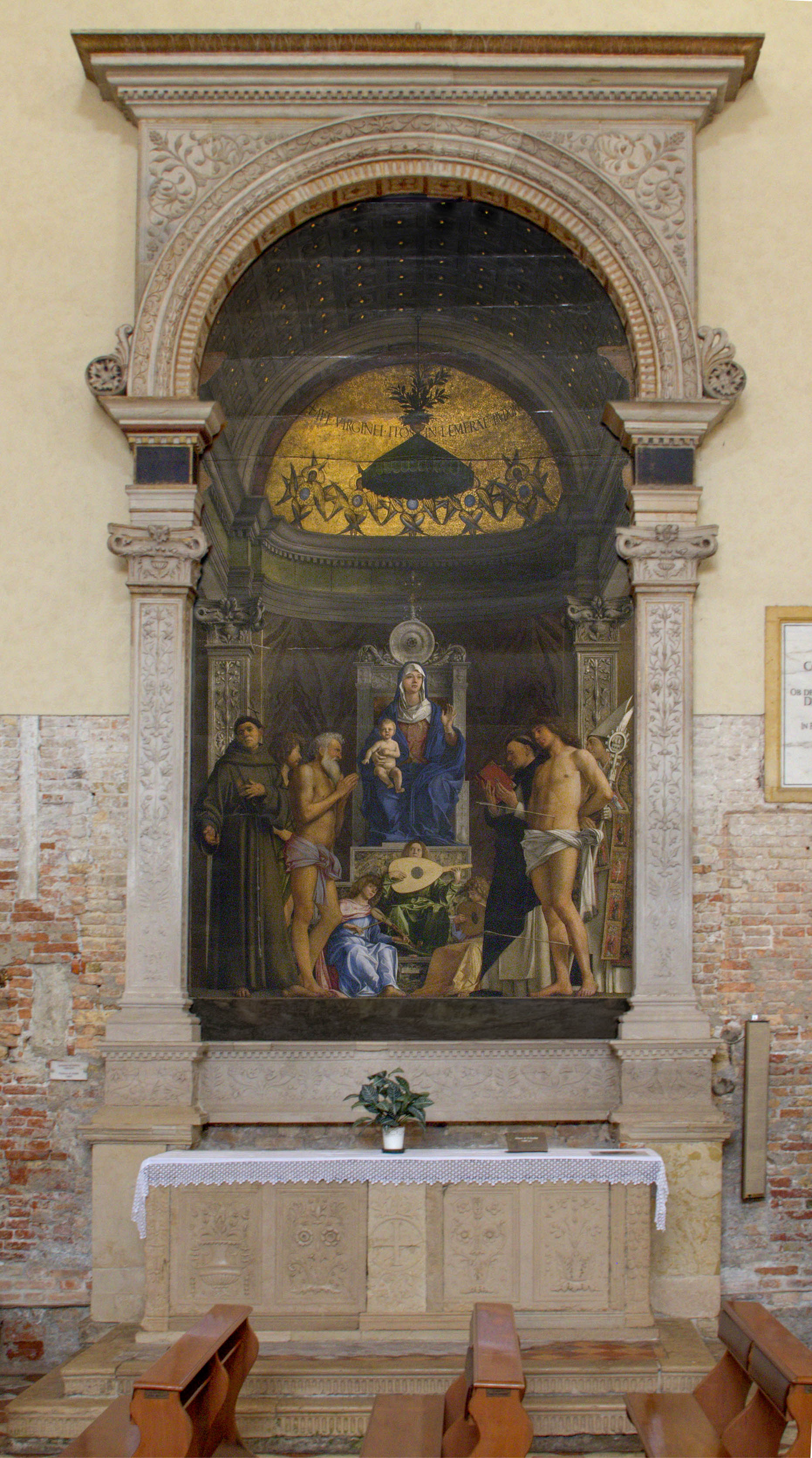
Copy of the altarpiece by Giovanni Bellini

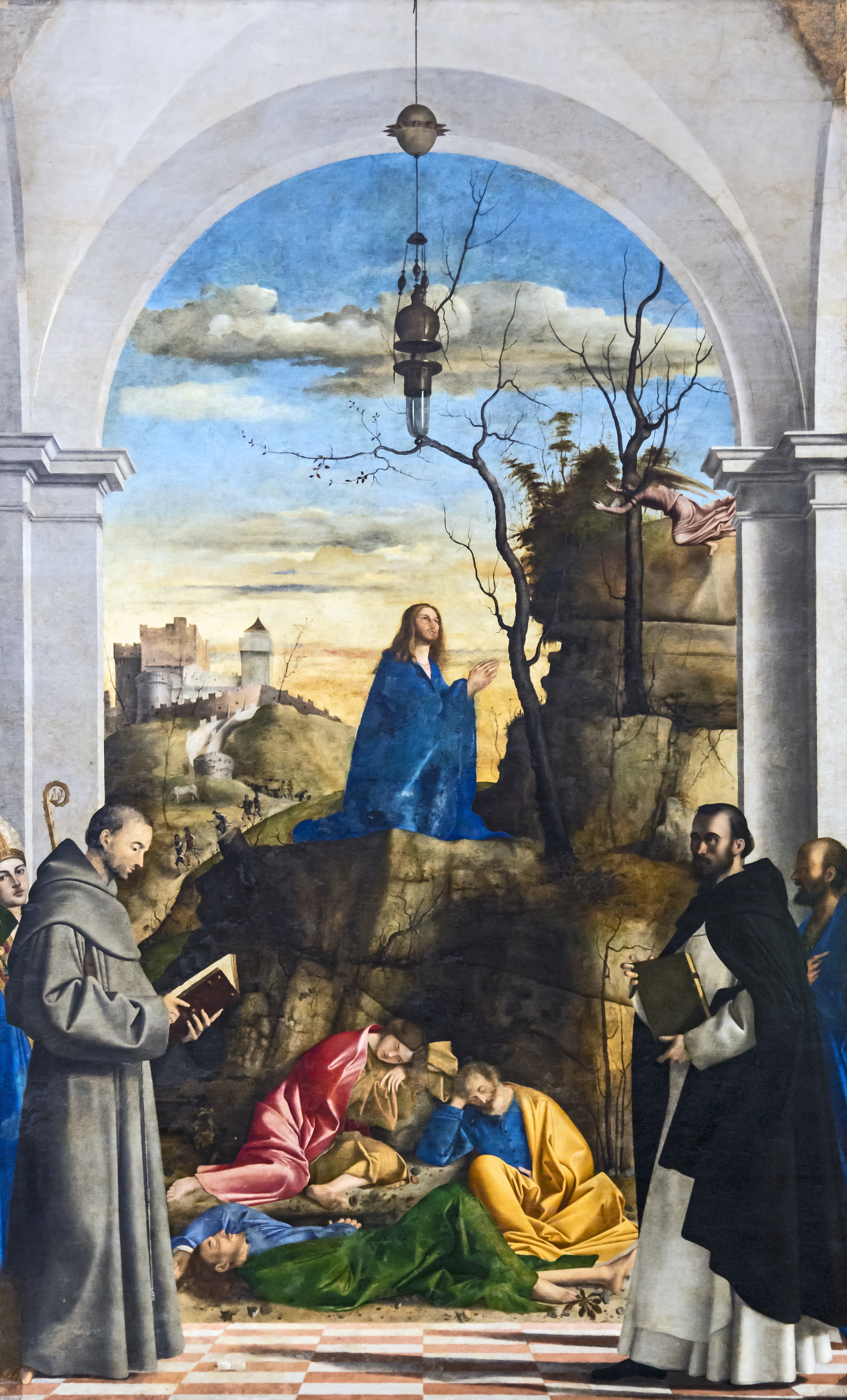
Prayer in the Garden by Marco Basaiti

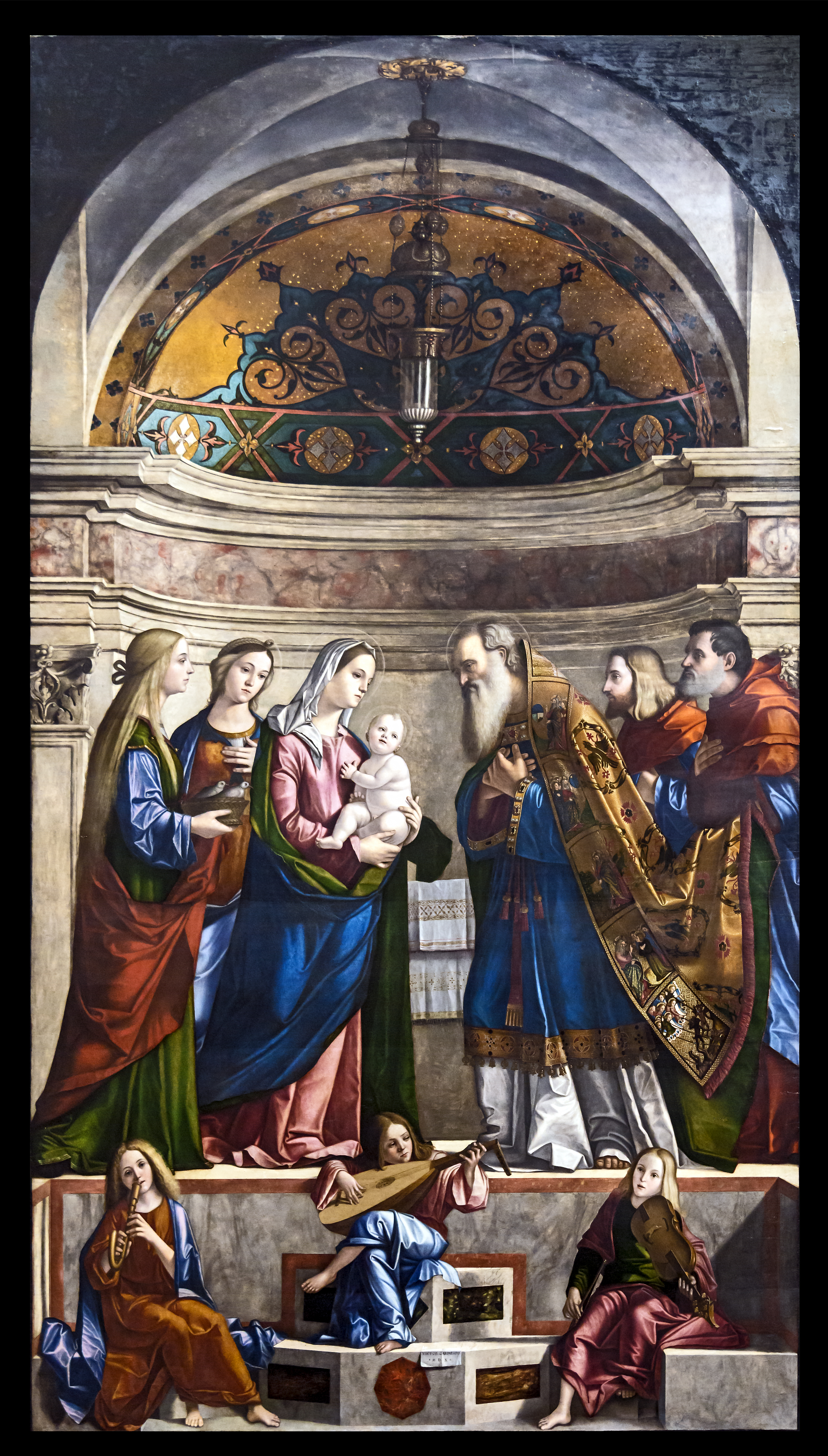
Presentation of Jesus in the Temple by Vittore Carpaccio

== See also ==
- Late medieval domes
- Italian Renaissance domes

== Bibliography ==
- (in Italian) Le chiese di Venezia, Marcello Brusegan; Ed. Newton Compton 2008
