= Ponte delle Guglie =

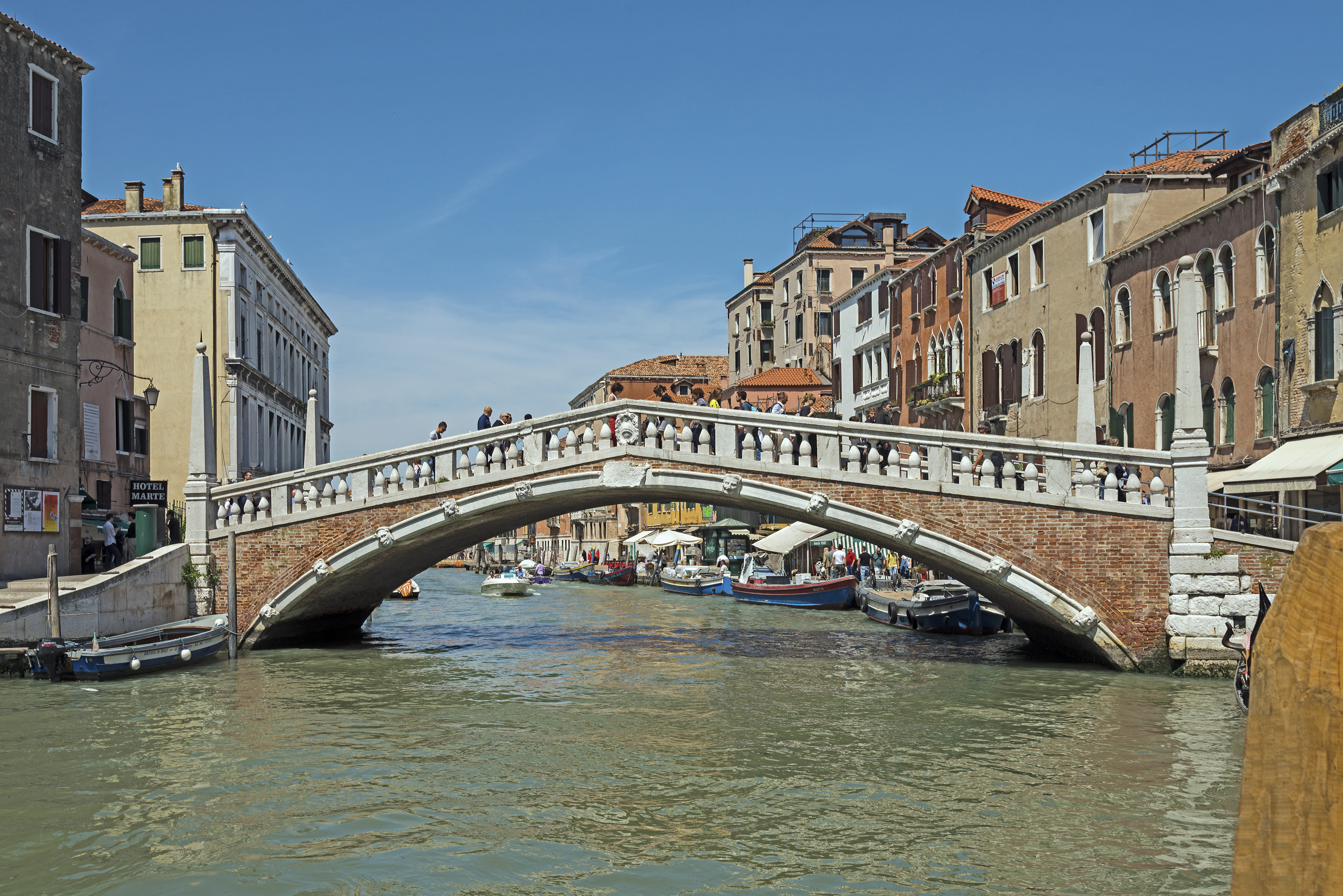
- Coordinates: 45.443656°N 12.32552°E
- Carries: pedestrians
- Crosses: Cannaregio Canal
- Locale: Venice, Italy
- Other name: Bridge of Spires

Characteristics
- Design: Arch bridge

History
- Opened: 1580

Location
- Interactive map of Ponte delle Guglie

The Ponte delle Guglie is one of two bridges in Venice, Italy, to span the Cannaregio Canal. It lies near the western end of the canal, by the Venezia Santa Lucia railway station.

An earlier wooden bridge was built in 1285. It was replaced by the current stone and brick bridge in 1580. It was restored in 1641 and 1677, and was totally rebuilt in 1823 at which time spires were added. Further restoration took place in 1987 with the addition of metal handrails, stone steps, and access for the disabled. The spires lie at each end of the bridge. A carved balustrade runs on either side of the walkway, and gargoyles decorate its arch. It is the only bridge in Venice adorned with spires from whence it takes its name ("Bridge of Spires").

For those arriving on foot from Piazzale Roma or the Venezia Santa Lucia railway station, the bridge leads into the area of the Venetian Ghetto and the Strada Nova that leads to Piazza San Marco.

The bridge itself is located just before the point where the Cannaregio Canal flows into the Grand Canal, just inside the bend that leads to the Rialto Bridge.
