= Palazzo Testa =

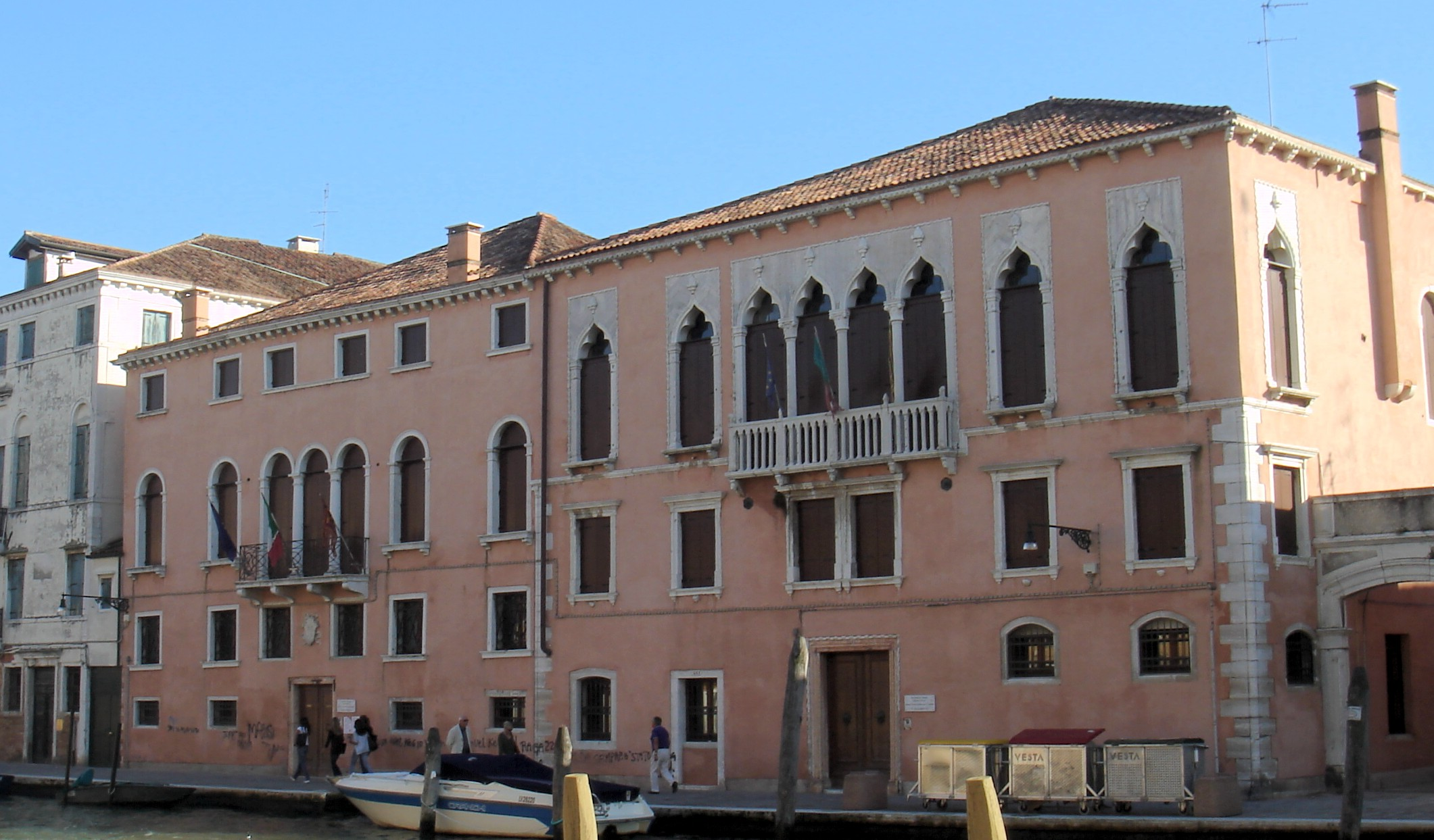
- Palazzo Testa
- Interactive map of the Palazzo Testa area

General information
- Type: Residential
- Architectural style: Gothic
- Location: Cannaregio district, Venice, Italy
- Coordinates: 45°26′40.56″N 12°19′23.16″E
- Construction stopped: 15th century

Technical details
- Floor count: 3 levels

Palazzo Testa is a small Gothic palace in Venice, Italy, located in the Cannaregio district and overlooking the Canale di Cannaregio.

== History ==
The palazzo was built in the 15th century but underwent numerous alterations between the 16th and 19th centuries. The building belonged at least from 1531 to 1748 to the ancient patrician Testa family. After the death of the last heir, Uberto Testa, the building passed to Count Alessandro di Marsciano. The palazzo remained the property of this family until 1808.

== Architecture ==
The small façade is of the late Gothic style. It consists of three floors with a noble floor on top. The noble floor is decorated with a quadrifora supported by a balcony. The balcony is decorated with lion heads. The quadrifora is flanked by a pair of lancet windows on each side. The mezzanine floor also had a four-light window in the center, but, after a renovation in the 19th century, the side parts were closed up, with the central parts still remaining.
