= Cannaregio Canal =

Waterway in Venice, Italy

Coordinates: 45.4451°N 12.3224°E

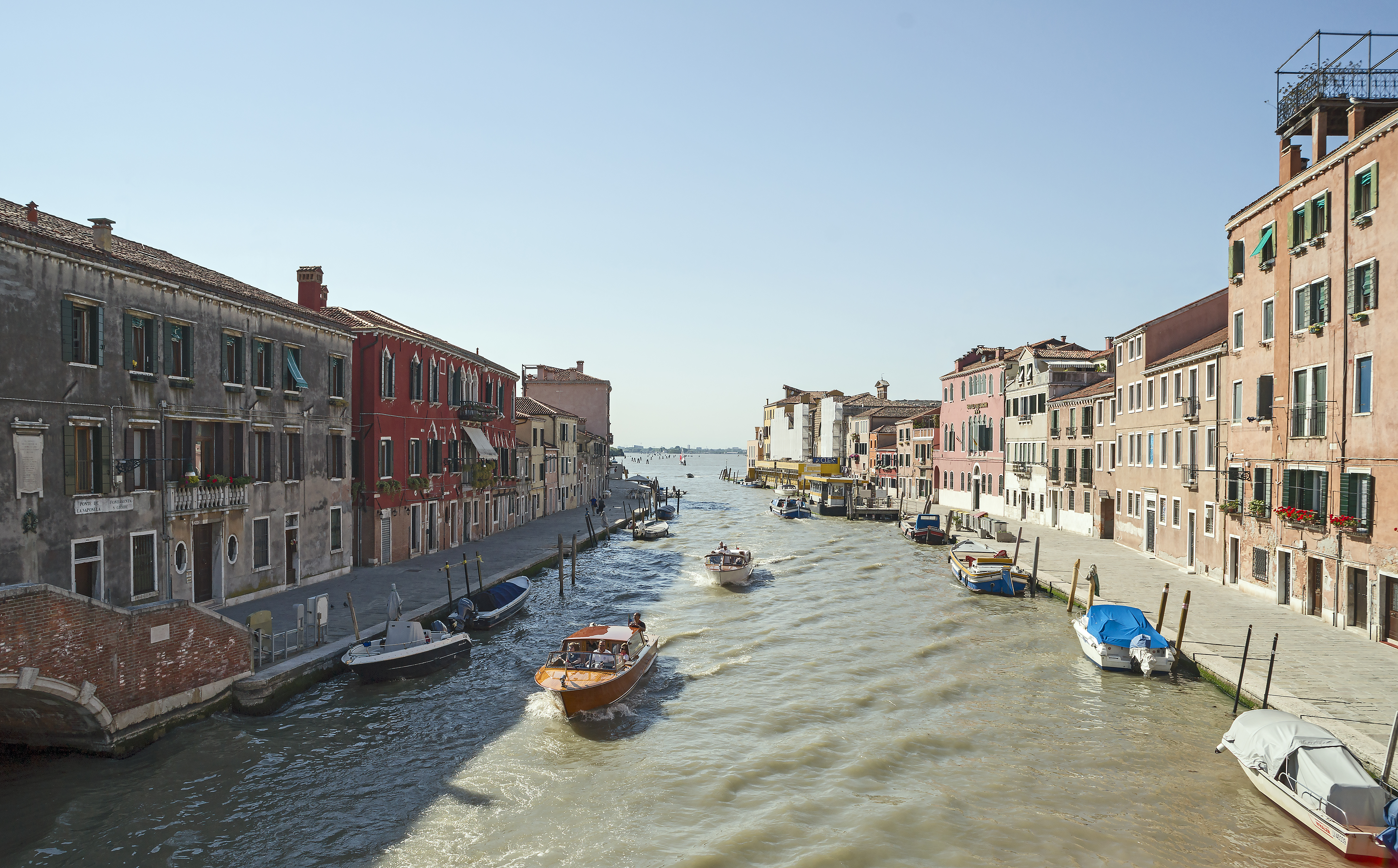
Cannaregio Canal viewed from Ponte dei Tre Archi towards the lagoon and the mainland

The Cannaregio Canal is one of the main waterways of Venice, Italy. Before the railway bridge was built in 1846 the Cannaregio Canal was the main entrance route into Venice.

The Cannaregio Canal is serviced by the Tre Archi, Crea, and Guglie vaporetto stops.

== Landmarks ==
- Palazzo Labia
- Palazzo Venier-Manfrin
- Palazzo Savorgnan
- Palazzo Bonfadini Vivante
- Palazzo Testa
- Palazzo Surian Bellotto
