= List of palaces in Venice =

This is a list of palaces in Venice classified by sestiere.

== Cannaregio ==
- Ca' da Mosto
- Ca' d'Oro
- Ca' Sagredo
- Ca' Vendramin Calergi
- Palazzo Benzi Zecchini
- Palazzo Benedetti a Santa Sofia
- Palazzo Bonfadini Vivante
- Palazzo Boldù a San Felice
- Palazzo Bollani Erizzo
- Palazzo Calbo Crotta
- Palazzo Cendon
- Palazzo Civran
- Palazzo Contarini Pisani
- Palazzo Contarini-Sceriman
- Palazzo Correr Contarini Zorzi
- Palazzo Donà Giovannelli
- Palazzo Emo at Maddalena
- Palazzo Erizzo alla Maddalena
- Palazzo Falier
- Palazzo Flangini
- Palazzo Fontana Rezzonico
- Palazzo Giusti
- Palazzo Giustinian Pesaro
- Palazzo Gritti
- Palazzo Gussoni Grimani Della Vida
- Palazzo Labia
- Palazzo da Lezze
- Palazzo Loredan Gheltoff
- Palazzo Loredan a San Cancian
- Palazzo Marcello
- Palazzo Mastelli del Cammello
- Palazzo Michiel del Brusà
- Palazzo Michiel dalle Colonne
- Palazzo Memmo Martinengo Mandelli
- Palazzo Molin Querini
- Palazzo Nani
- Palazzo Pesaro Papafava
- Palazzo Priuli Manfrin
- Palazzo Ruzzini
- Palazzo Savorgnan
- Palazzo Smith Mangilli Valmarana
- Palazzo Soranzo Piovene
- Palazzo Soranzo Van Axel
- Palazzo di Spagna a San Geremia
- Palazzo Surian Bellotto
- Palazzo Testa

== Castello ==
- Casa Venier
- Palazzo Dandolo
- Palazzo Donà-Ottobon
- Palazzo Erizzo a San Martino
- Palazzo Grandiben Negri
- Palazzo Grimani di Santa Maria Formosa
- Palazzo Malipiero-Trevisan
- Palazzo Molina
- Palazzo Querini Stampalia
- Palazzo Trevisan Cappello
- Palazzo Vitturi
- Palazzo Zorzi Bon
- Palazzo Zorzi Galeoni

== Dorsoduro ==
- Ca' Bembo
- Ca' Foscari
- Ca' Rezzonico
- Ca' Zenobio degli Armeni
- Casa dei Tre Oci
- Palazzo Ariani
- Palazzo Balbi
- Palazzo Barbarigo
- Palazzo Barbarigo Nani Mocenigo
- Palazzo Barbaro Wolkoff
- Palazzo Bernardo Nani
- Palazzo Brandolin Rota
- Palazzo Caotorta-Angaran
- Palazzo Clary
- Palazzo Contarini Dal Zaffo
- Palazzo Dario
- Palazzo Foscari
- Palazzo Genovese
- Palazzo Giustinian
- Palazzo Giustinian Recanati
- Palazzo Loredan dell'Ambasciatore
- Palazzo Loredan Cini
- Palazzo Mocenigo Gambara
- Palazzo Orio Semitecolo Benzon
- Palazzo Salviati
- Palazzo Venier dei Leoni

== San Marco ==
- Doge's Palace
- Royal Palace (Venice)
- Ca' Farsetti
- Ca' Giustinian
- Ca' Loredan
- Palazzo Barbarigo Minotto
- Palazzi Barbaro
- Palazzo Bauer
- Palazzo Bellavite
- Palazzo Bembo
- Palazzo Cavalli
- Palazzo Cavalli-Franchetti
- Palazzo Contarini del Bovolo
- Palazzo Contarini Fasan
- Palazzo Contarini delle Figure
- Palazzo Corner della Ca' Grande
- Palazzo Corner Contarini dei Cavalli
- Palazzo Corner Gheltof
- Palazzo Corner Spinelli
- Palazzo Corner Valmarana
- Palazzo Curti Valmarana
- Palazzo D'Anna Viaro Martinengo Volpi di Misurata
- Palazzo Dolfin Manin
- Palazzo Erizzo Nani Mocenigo
- Palazzo Farsetti
- Palazzo Ferro Fini
  - Palazzo Morosini Ferro
  - Palazzo Flangini Fini
- Palazzo Garzoni
- Palazzo Giustinian Lolin
- Palazzo Grassi
- Palazzo Grimani di San Luca
- Palazzo Loredan in Campo Santo Stefano
- Palazzo Malipiero
- Palazzi Mocenigo
  - Palazzo Mocenigo Casa Nuova
  - Palazzo Mocenigo Casa Vecchia
  - Palazzo Mocenigo detto "il Nero"
- Palazzo Molin del Cuoridoro
- Palazzo Moro Lin (San Marco)
- Palazzo Morosini Gatterburg
- Palazzo Patriarcale
- Palazzo Pesaro Orfei
- Palazzo Pisani Gritti
- Palazzo Pisani a San Stefano
- Palazzo Querini Benzon
- Palazzo Trevisan Pisani
- Palazzo Venier Contarini

== San Polo ==
- Ca' Sanudo Turloni
- Palazzo Barbarigo della Terrazza
- Palazzo Barzizza
- Palazzo Bernardo a San Polo
- Palazzo dei Camerlenghi
- Palazzo Cappello Layard
- Palazzo Civran Grimani
- Palazzo Dandolo Paolucci
- Palazzo dei Dieci Savi
- Palazzo Donà Brusa
- Palazzo Donà della Madoneta
- Palazzo Donà a Sant'Aponal
- Palazzo Giustiniani Businello
- Palazzo Giustinian Loredan
- Palazzo Giustinian Persico
- Palazzo Grimani Marcello
- Palazzo Marcello dei Leoni
- Palazzo Moro Lin (San Polo)
- Palazzo Morosini Brandolin
- Palazzo Muti Baglioni
- Palazzo Papadopoli
- Palazzo Pisani Moretta
- Palazzo Querini Dubois
- Palazzo Soranzo
- Palazzo Tiepoletto
- Palazzo Tiepolo
- Palazzo Tiepolo Passi
- Palazzo Pisani Moretta

== Santa Croce ==
- Ca' Pesaro
- Ca' Tron
- Fondaco dei Turchi
- Fondaco del Megio
- Palazzo Adoldo
- Palazzo Belloni Battagia
- Palazzo Corner della Regina
- Palazzo Correggio
- Palazzo Donà Balbi
- Palazzo Duodo
- Palazzo Emo Diedo
- Palazzo Foscari Contarini
- Palazzo Giovanelli
- Palazzo Gradenigo
- Palazzo Marcello Toderini
- Palazzo Mocenigo di San Stae
- Palazzo Priuli Bon
- Palazzo Priuli Stazio
- Palazzo Soranzo Cappello

== Other islands ==
- Palazzo da Mula (Murano)
