= Palazzo Moro Lin =

Palazzo Moro Lin may refer to:

- Palazzo Moro Lin (San Marco), a 17th century Venetian palace in the San Marco sestiere
- Palazzo Moro Lin (San Polo), a 16th century Venetian palace in the San Polo sestiere
