= Piovene =

Piovene may refer to:

== Places ==
- Palazzo Soranzo Piovene, also called Soranzo Piovene alla Maddalena, Renaissance-style palace on the Grand Canal, Venice
- Piovene Rocchette, a town in the province of Vicenza, Veneto, northern Italy
- Villa Piovene, Palladian villa built in Lugo di Vicenza

== People with the surname ==
- Agostino Piovene, 18th-century Venetian librettist; see, for example, Vivaldi's Bajazet
- Guido Piovene (1907–1974), Italian writer and journalist
