= Spagna (disambiguation) =

Ivana Spagna (born 1954), often known as just Spagna, is an Italian singer and songwriter.

Spagna may also refer to:

== People ==
- Butch Spagna (1897–1948), American football player
- Lo Spagna (died c. 1529), Italian Renaissance painter
- Michael E. Spagna (born 1962), American academic

== Places ==
- The Italian name for Spain
- Collegio di Spagna, a college in Bologna, Italy
- Palazzo di Spagna a San Geremia, a palace in Venice, Italy
- Piazza di Spagna, a square in Rome, Italy
  - Palazzo di Spagna, a palace in Piazza di Spagna
  - Spagna (Rome Metro), a metro station near Piazza di Spagna

== Other uses ==
- Another term for Nebbiolo grapes
- La Spagna, a 14th-century Italian epic
