= Palazzo Patriarcale =

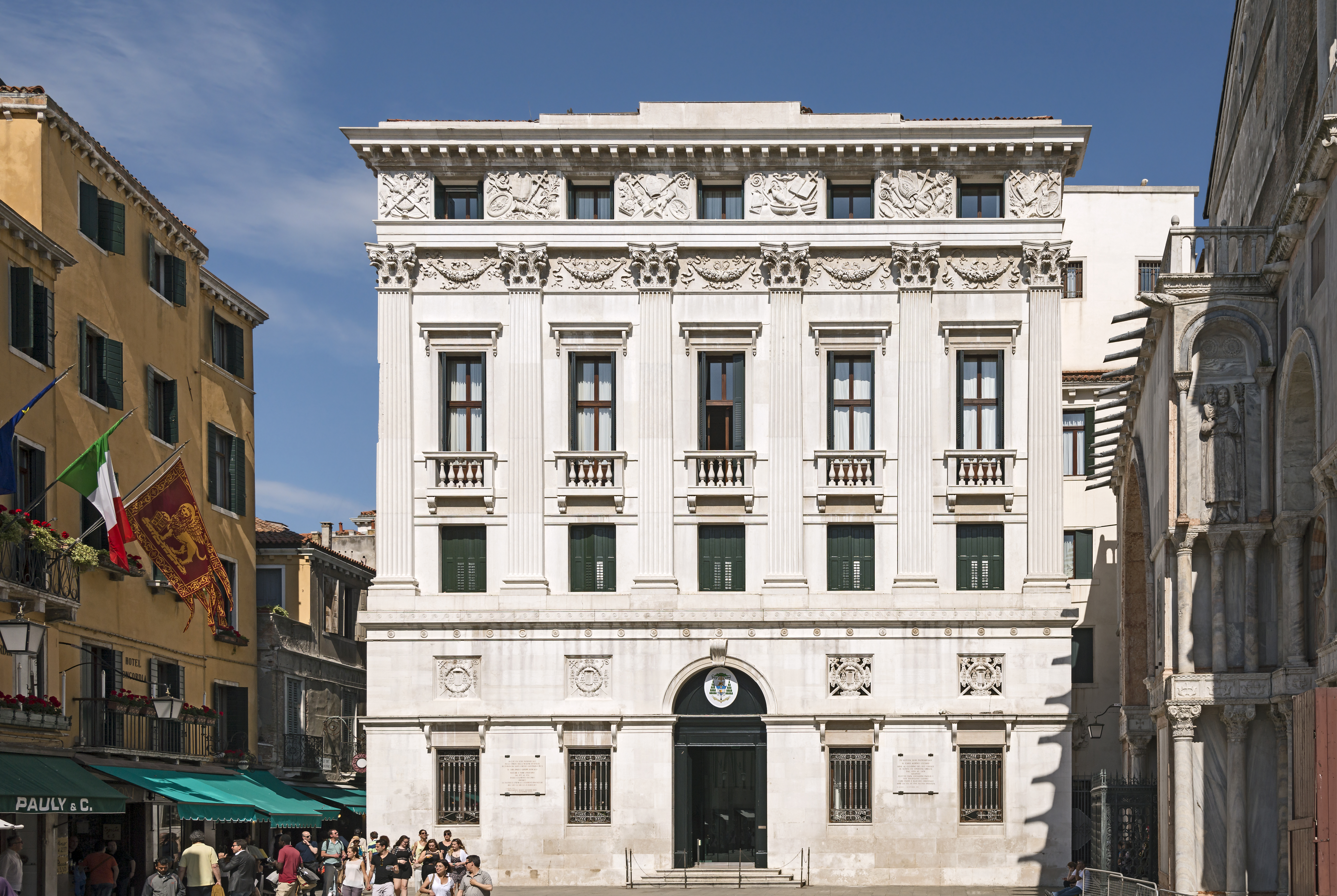
- Interactive map of the Palazzo Patriarcale area

General information
- Architectural style: Venetian Classical style
- Completed: 1850

Palazzo Patriarcale (or Arcivescovile) is a palace in the Piazzetta dei Leoncini, Venice, Italy. It is the seat of the Patriarchate of Venice.

== History ==
After the fall of the Venetian Republic, St Mark's Basilica became a cathedral, the Palazzo Patriarcale was built as the new headquarters of the Patriarchate of Venice (former headquarter was San Pietro di Castello). In 1837, architect Lorenzo Santi started to work on the building. The construction ended in 1850.

From 1894 to 1903, the building was the residence of Giuseppe Melchiorre Sarto (1835-1914), who later became Pope Pius X.

Between 2005 and 2007, the Diocesan Museum hosted two private exhibitions, Il ciclo di Tintoretto e la quadreria del Palazzo Patriarcale and "Officina Dürer".

In 2006, the heating and air-conditioning systems in the building were modernized. The Diocesan Museum, housed in the building, opened to the public in 2007.

== Description ==
The Palazzo Patriarcale is adjacent to the St Mark's Basilica. The façade faces the Piazzetta dei Leoncini.

The building also houses the Historical Archive of the Patriarchate of Venice.

== Related pages ==
- Patriarchate of Venice
- List of palaces in Venice
