= Piazzetta dei Leoncini =

City square in Venice, Italy

Coordinates: 45°26′5.25″N 12°20′21.81″E

- Square (piazza)
- Location: Venice, Italy
- Interactive map of Piazzetta dei Leoncini

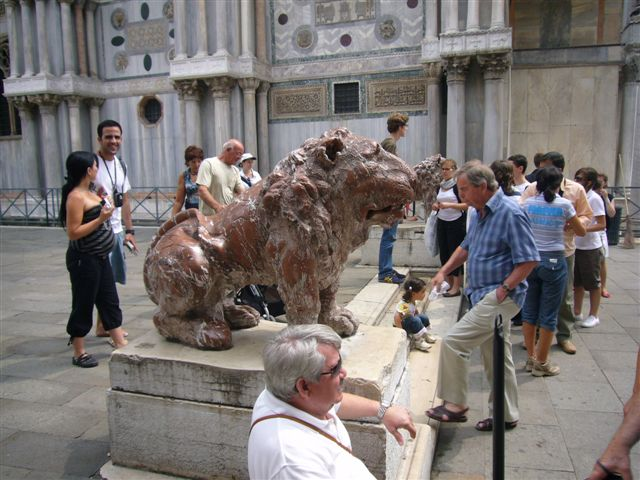
Piazzetta dei Leoncini

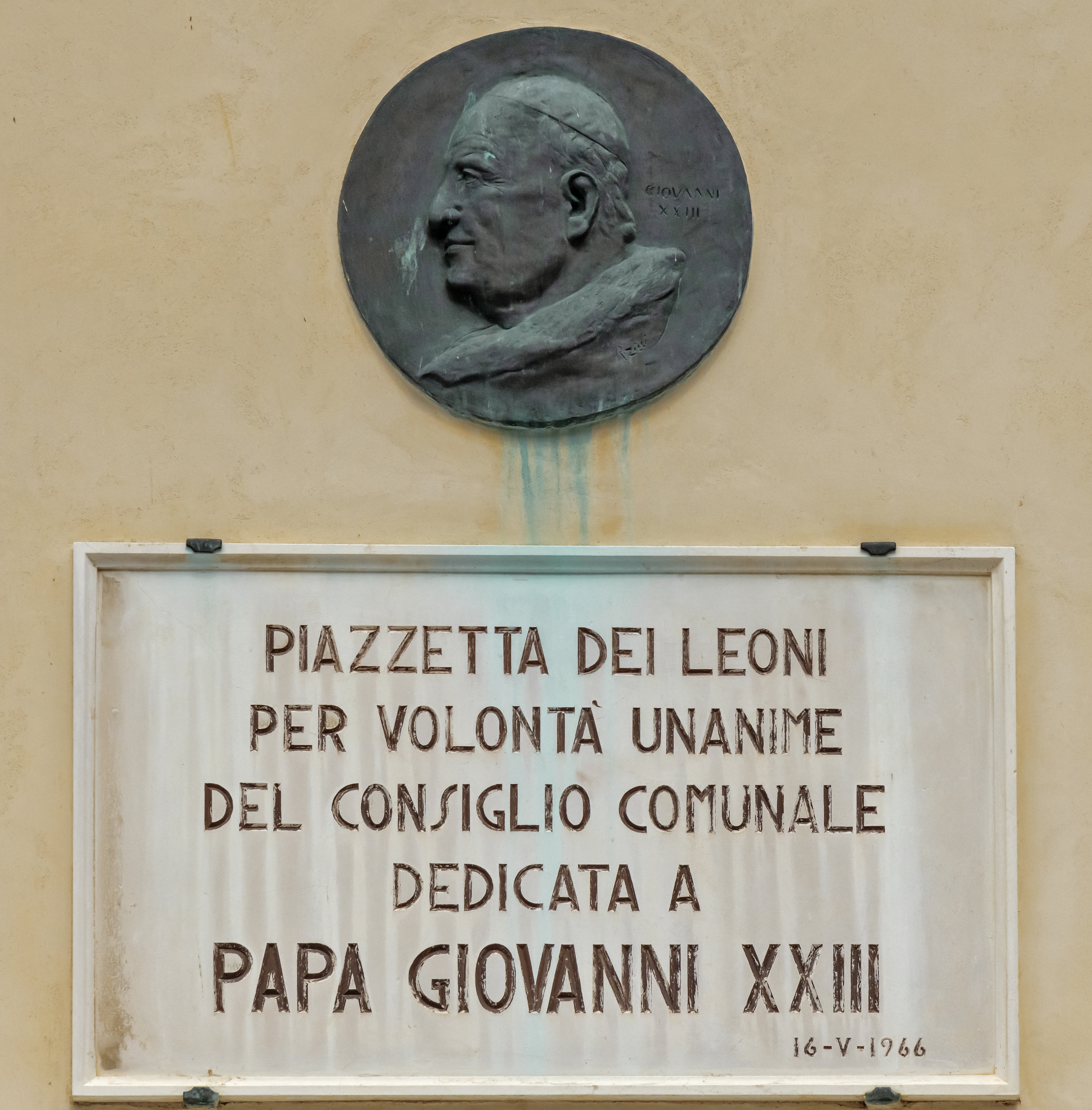
Relief of Papa Giovanni XXIII

Piazzetta dei Leoncini is a city square in Venice, Italy. The square is located on the north side of the St Mark's Basilica, near the Palazzo Patriarcale and San Basso. The square is known for its lion statuary in marble of Cottanello, made by the sculptor Giovanni Bonazza in 1722. Also on the square, in an alcove of the Basilica itself, is the sarcophagus of Daniele Manin, the president of the brief independent Republic of San Marco, established during a rebellion in 1848 against Habsburg rule.
