= Rudolf Stingel =

American artist (born 1956)

Rudolf Stingel (born 1956) is an artist based in New York City.

Stingel was born in Merano, Italy. His work engages the audience in dialogue about their perception of art and uses conceptual painting and installations to explore the process of creation. Using readily available materials such as styrofoam, carpet, and cast polyurethane, Stingel creates art based upon an underlying conceptual framework and challenges contemporary notions about painting. The surfaces of his two-dimensional works are characteristically carved out, imprinted or indented, visibly evidencing the artist's alteration of industrial matter. He lives in New York and Merano, Italy.

== Work ==
Stingel became first recognised in the late 1980s for his monochromatic works, silvery paintings with undertones of red, yellow or blue from 1987 to 1994. Stingel's later abstract paintings from the 1990s consist of oils in pure, brilliant colors exuberantly splayed, dripped, pressed, and pulled across a black field. The works begin with the application of a thick layer of paint in a particular colour to the canvas. Pieces of gauze are then placed over the surface of the canvas and silver paint is added using a spray gun. Finally, the gauze is removed, resulting in a richly textured surface.

In the late 1980s, Stingel began a series of works on paper using a technique of applying oil and enamel paint onto paper through a tulle screen to create monochrome paintings with texture and fine patterning (see Untitled, 1998, oil and enamel on paper). At the Venice Biennale in 1989, he published an illustrated "do-it-yourself" manual in English, Italian, German, French, Spanish and Japanese, Instructions, Istruzioni, Anleitung..., outlining the equipment and procedure that would enable anyone to create one of his paintings. In so doing, he suggests that everyone could produce a work of abstraction by following a simple set of instructions.

In the early 1990s, Stingel created a series of radiator sculptures made of translucent cast resin in which orange acrylic paint was poured during the casting process. Installed like ordinary radiators, the works nevertheless disallow their identification to a purely utilitarian object through their marbled ember-like glow. Also in the early 1990s, Stingel started his inquiry into the relationship between painting and space by developing a series of installations that covered the walls and floors of exhibition spaces with monochrome or black and white carpets, transforming the architecture into a painting. He first used carpet in an installation for Daniel Newburg Gallery, New York, in 1991. In 1993, he exhibited a huge plush orange carpet glued to the wall at the Venice Biennale. In his site-specific Plan B (2004), he covered the entire floors of Grand Central Terminal’s Vanderbilt Hall and the Walker Art Center with an industrially-printed pink and blue floral carpet. Simultaneously in Frankfurt am Main, Stingel completely resurfaced one of the rooms of the Museum für Moderne Kunst – walls, columns and floor – with bright red and silver insulation panels printed with a traditional damask wallpaper motif. During the 2013 Venice Biennale, he covered the Palazzo Grassi with his own Persian-inspired carpeting on which he hung his abstract and Photo Realist paintings.

In other installations, he covered the walls with silver metallic Celotex insulation board and invited visitors to mark them as they wished: at the 2003 Venice Biennale Stingel created a silver room inside the Italian pavilion. As part of his 2007 mid-career retrospective at the Museum of Contemporary Art, Chicago and at the Whitney Museum of American Art, the artist covered the gallery walls with metallic Celotex insulation board and invited visitors to draw, write and make imprints on the surface of the softly reflective silver panelling, effectively removing artistic privilege from the mark of the individual and handing it over to the collective gestures of thousands of viewers. His paintings from that period are often created through a performative process in which Stingel covers the entire floor of his studio with Styrofoam and then walks across the thick surface in boots dipped in lacquer thinner. The Styrofoam melts with each of Stingel's steps leaving behind only the markings of a footprint. The final work is then arranged in single, double or as in this case a monumentous four panels taken from the much larger field of panels that covered the entire studio floor.

Starting with his portrait of gallerist Paula Cooper (Untitled, 2005), Stingel has been embarking on a series of paintings based on photographic portraits, all taken by other photographers (e.g. Robert Mapplethorpe). Stingel's next engagement with photography arrived as a series of black-and-white self-portraits painted in 2006 [“Untitled (After Sam),” 2005-06], all painted after photographs taken by the artist Sam Samore. They are executed in a gray-scale palette to match black and white photos. He depicted himself at various stages of his life, in a melancholy state, a mid-life crisis, and one as a much younger man dressed in an army uniform. The photographs were shown together with vast abstract canvases of markings constituted solely by the traces of time and action in the studio.

First exhibited in “Rudolf Stingel. LIVE” at Neue Nationalgalerie, Berlin in 2010, a series of immense landscape paintings measuring up to fifteen feet in width is based on vintage black-and-white photographs of Stingel's birthplace, Merano, in the Tyrolean Alps.

Stingel has collaborated with fellow artist Urs Fischer on several occasions.

== Exhibitions ==
Stingel has participated in the 1999 and 2003 Venice Biennales. His work was the subject of a mid-career retrospective called Rudolf Stingel and was organized by the Museum of Contemporary Art, Chicago. It was exhibited at the MCA and at the Whitney Museum of American Art, New York, in 2007. In his first solo museum exhibition in the United States, Stingel lined the MCA's three-story atrium space, and a gallery space at the Whitney, with an aluminum-faced installation and suspended an ornate chandelier from the ceiling. The public was invited to scratch messages and images into the soft walls.

== Art market ==
Stingel's prices skyrocketed after his 2007 show at the Whitney Museum in New York, until a big Styrofoam board fetched $1.9 million at Phillips de Pury & Company. Between February 2007 and March 2009, 56 of his works appeared at auction—more than double the quantity offered over the entire previous decade. At a Christie's New York auction in 2015, Stingel's Untitled (1993), part of his series of silver paintings, sold for the artist at $4,757,000. On May 17, 2017, at Christie's Post-War and Contemporary Art Evening Sale, Stingel's "Untitled (for Sam)" sold at an auction high for the artist at $10,551,500.

== Recognition ==
In 2008, Stingel received second place for Best Monographic Museum Show Nationally by the U.S. Art Critics Association for the 2006–07 season.
