= Palazzo Benedetti a Santa Sofia, Venice =

14th-century palace in Italy

Coordinates: 45.4416°N 12.3360°E

The Palazzo Benedetti a Santa Sofia is a 14th-century Venetian-Gothic style palace with a characteristic and rare sottoportego or portico at the canal side, located near Santa Sofia in the sestiere of Cannaregio. Across the bridge from the palace is the Palazzo Priuli Stazio. This palace also called the Palazzo di Sottoportico della Guerra.

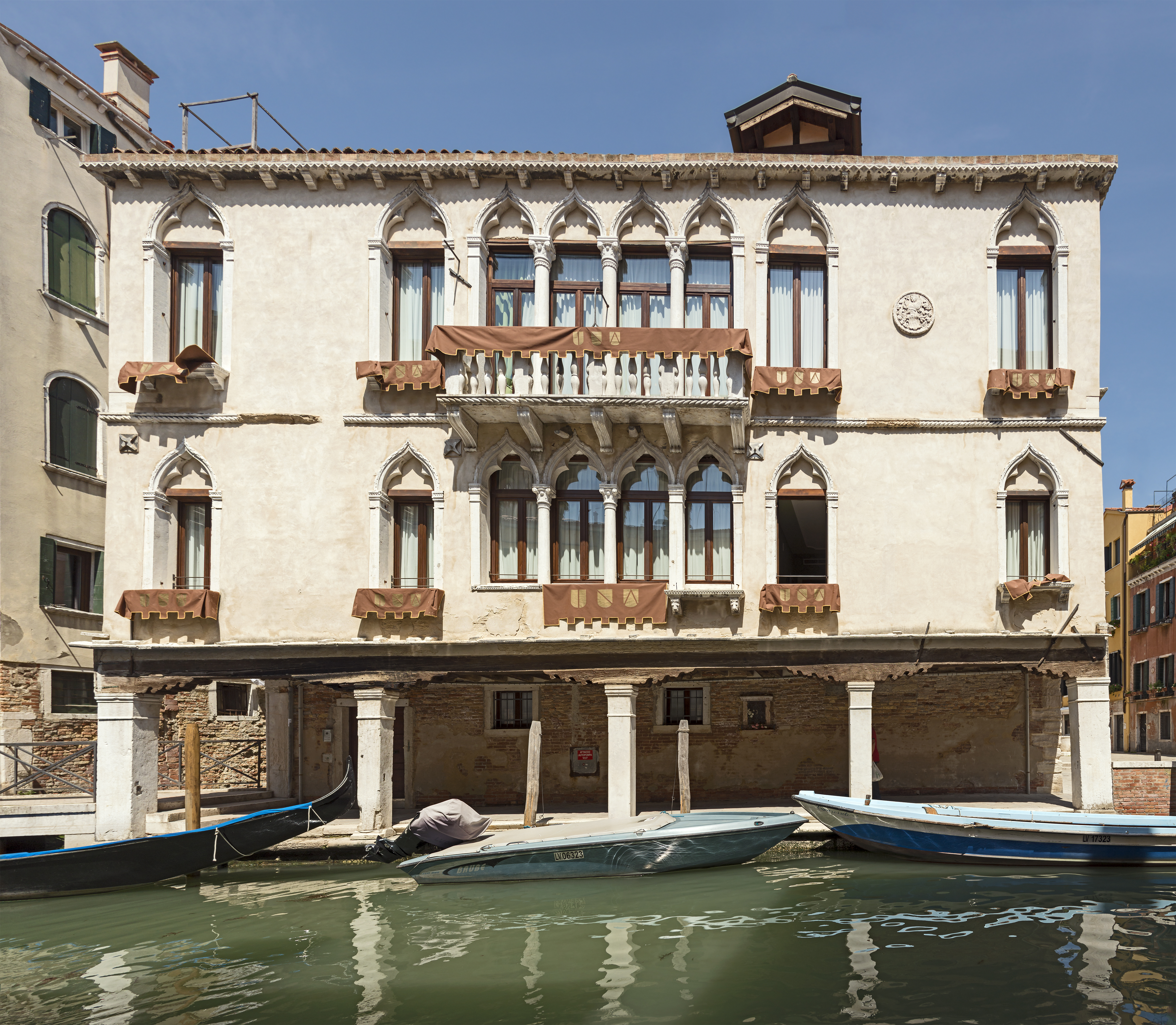
Palazzo Benedetti from Rio Priuli

== History ==
The coat of arms on the facade is evidence the palace was built by the Benedetti family. Some from this family, known for warriors and bishops, were part of old aristocracy; they supposedly immigrated to Venice before the 13th century from Acre in the orient. In 1537 documents submitted to the council of the Savi, Alvise Benedetti, son of Domenico, notified that he resided here. Pietro Benedetti, counselor of the Sestiere of Cannaregio, lived here in 1622.

On June 8–9, 1658 while Pietro's son, Vincenzo was asleep in the palace, he was beset by robbers and murdered. Arrested for the crime were Giuseppe Righi, a merchant, Pietro a barber from Campo Sant'Angelo, Francesco Menegatti a sea-captain, Tomaso Carli, a friend of Righi, and Antonio and herbalist from Sant'Angelo, Simeone Maggiotto, and Girolamo Biriboccoli, both from Cannaregio, also a monk named Leone from the convent of San Giobbe, brother of the barber Pietro. They were all sentenced on by June 26, 1658, The first two were sentenced to be led on foot from the prison near the ducal palace, to the scene of the crime; there to have their right hands cut off, and with the detached hands hung around their neck, to be dragged behind horses to the site between the columns in the Piazetta where they would be branded three times with a flaming rod, and all the while forced to proclaim their wickedness aloud. It is not clear if they were then hung, since this was commonly also the site for executions. The third was sentenced to 12 years in prison. The others had fled Venice, and were forever banned from returning, but if apprehended would face the punishment of the first two. Vincenzo, the last of the Benedetti name, was buried in San Zanipolo in the 2nd chapel on right, where a plaque reads:

Shudder visitor as you inspect this admirable heap/ of this deformed stone trophy/A wonder of Piety, Vincent Benedetti, here/ does not rest, but was ejected into a sad fate,/ until Christ brings acclamation to those in his Benediction/in the name of the lord who came to the Cross. /Inhumanity betrayed the happy Vincent/The name Benedetti to a cruel world, to continue/ as unable because of murderers and robbers/whose nature made extinct this nobel family/ of a growing spirit of virtue, faith, and modesty/eternal examples of piety, with him relinquised the ideas and meditations of the male line/ that alway lives and stays in sons, for ever,/ Obey his memory, those who contemplate/ intemperate memories, in the year 1658/ July, age 61 year.

The inscription is attributed to Giovanni Benedetto Perazzo, a dominical monk of the convent of Santi Giovanni e Paolo:

HORRESCE VIATOR INSPICE TUMULUM ADMIRARE/
SCELUS GORGONE DEFORMIUS LAPIDESCE TROPHEUM/
STUPORIS PIETATIS VINCENTIUS BENEDICTUS HIC/
NON JACET SED EJECTUS A TRISTI FATO VI CECIDIT/
UTI CHRISTUS POST ACCLAMATIONEM BENEDICTUS/
QUI VENIT IN NOMINE DOMINI AD CRUCEM/
INHUMANITER TRADITUS SIC VICENTIUS FOELICI/
NOMINE BENEDICTUS POTUIT A MUNDO CRUDELITER/
TRUCIDARI A RAPTORIBUS RAPTUS VEL EREPTUS NESCIO/
IN EO NATURALITER DESINIT FAMILIA SED EGREGIAS /
SPIRITU GIGNENDO VIRTUTES RELIGIONIS MODESTIAE/
PIETATIS EXEMPLAR PERENNES RELIQUIT IDEAS/
QUIBUS MEDITATIONE ADHAERENDO UT AGNATI/
SEMPER VIVANT FILIOS SIBI STATUIT AETERNOS/
HANC MEMORIAM TESTATORI OBTEMPERATES/
HAEREDES POSUERE ANNO DEI MDCLVIII MENSE/
IULIO AETATIS SUAE AN. LXI.
