= Palazzo Adoldo =

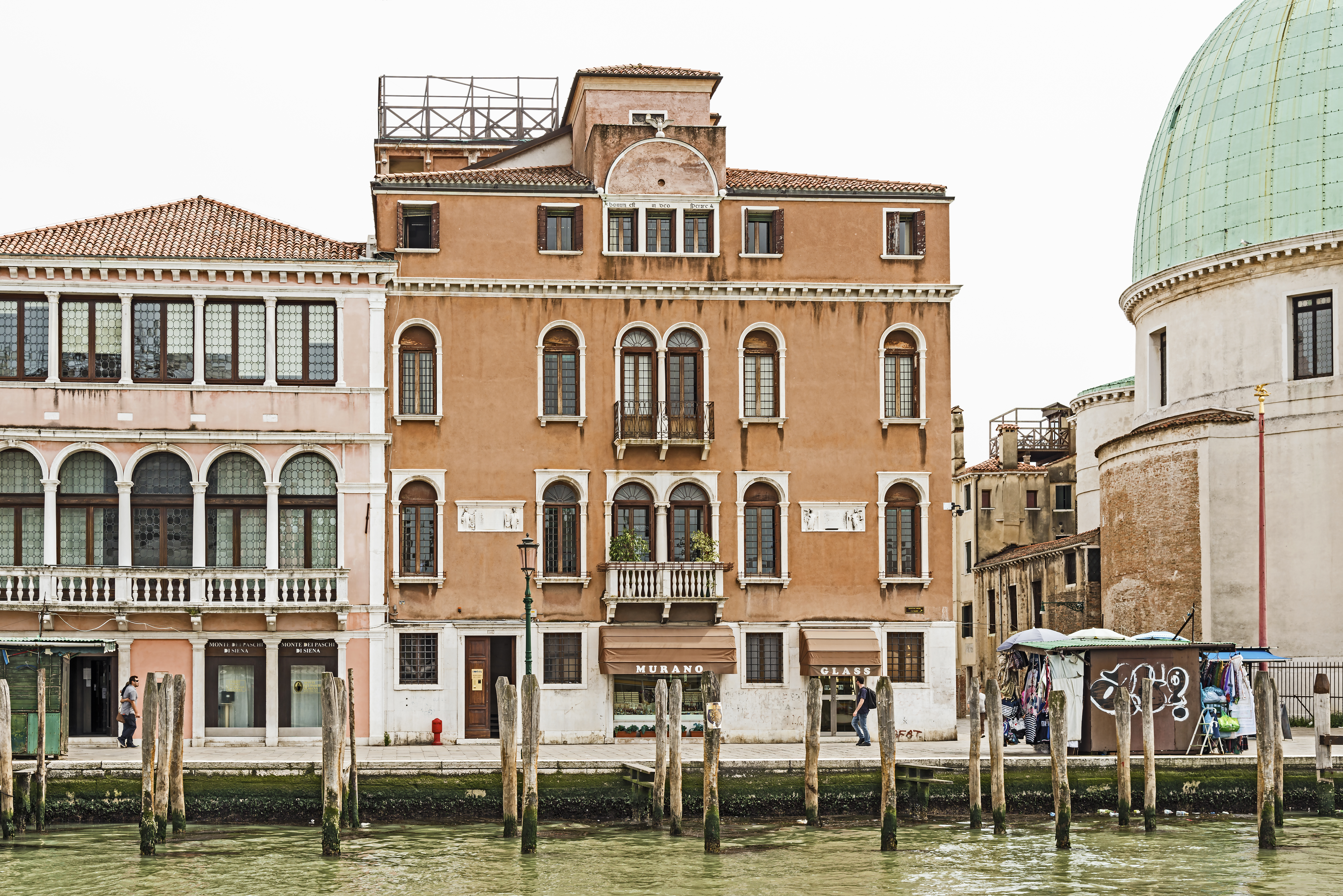
- Palazzo Adoldo overlooking the Grand Canal
- Interactive map of the Palazzo Adoldo area

General information
- Type: Residential
- Architectural style: Renaissance
- Location: Santa Croce district, Venice, Italy
- Coordinates: 45°26′26″N 12°19′21″E
- Renovated: 16th century

Technical details
- Floor count: 4

Palazzo Adoldo is a Renaissance palace in Venice, located in the Santa Croce district and overlooking the Grand Canal. On the right there is the church of San Simeon Piccolo, on the left—Palazzo Foscari Contarini.

== History ==
The present palazzo was built in first half of the 16th century. The place is ancient and was home of the Adoldo or Adoaldo family of Greek origin ascribed to the Venetian aristocracy. The Adoldos settled in Venice in the first centuries of the city's foundation and contributed significantly to finance the construction of the nearby church of San Simeon Piccolo. They owned the island of Andro and half of the island of Sercino that the last descendant, Nicolò, who died in 1432, sold to the Michiels. A member of the family, Lucia Adoldo, donated the palace to the parish of San Simeon Piccolo, as evidenced by an inscription on the facade. The same stone mentions that in 1520 the unsafe building was rebuilt and enlarged by Vittore Spiera.

== Architecture ==
The façade consists of three floors and a mezzanine. The ground floor is covered with white stone and has simple rectangular openings. The two noble floors are decorated with biforas with Ionic columns. The biforas are flanked by a pair of monoforas on each side. The first noble floor has two stone boards on the wall. The top floor features a peculiar central tower with three squared windows united by an arch. On its top there is a statuette of eagle.

== Gallery ==
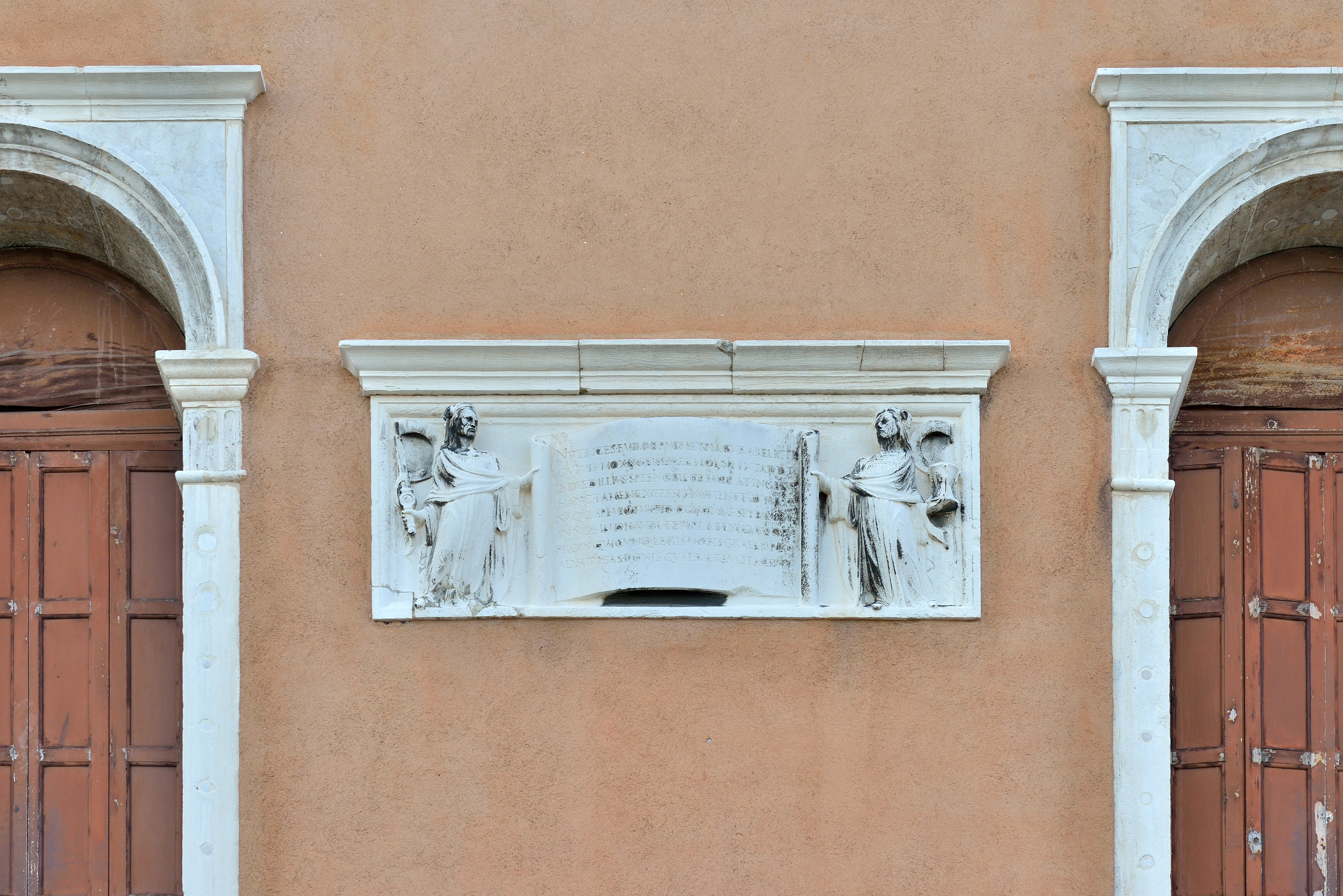
The right board

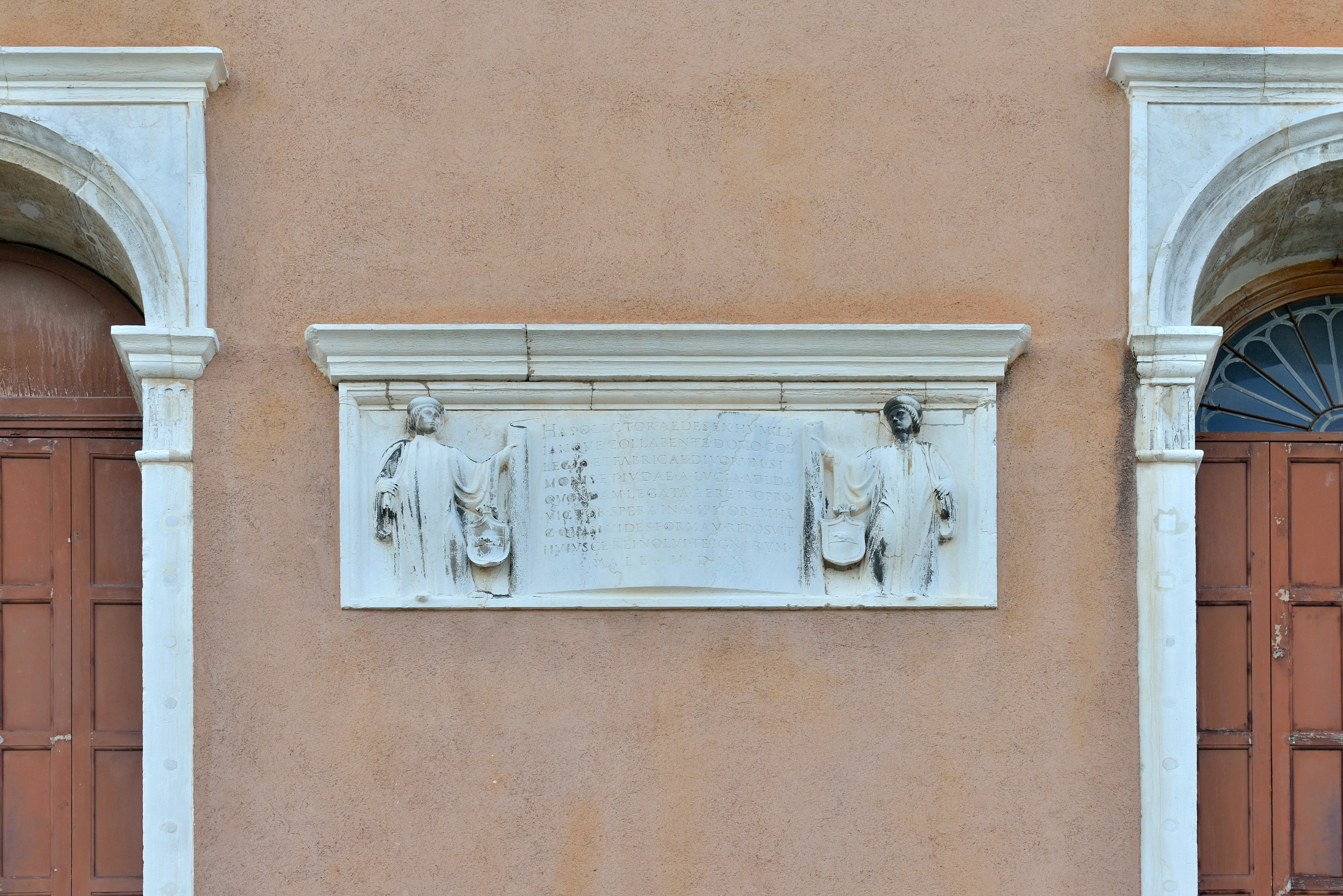
The left board

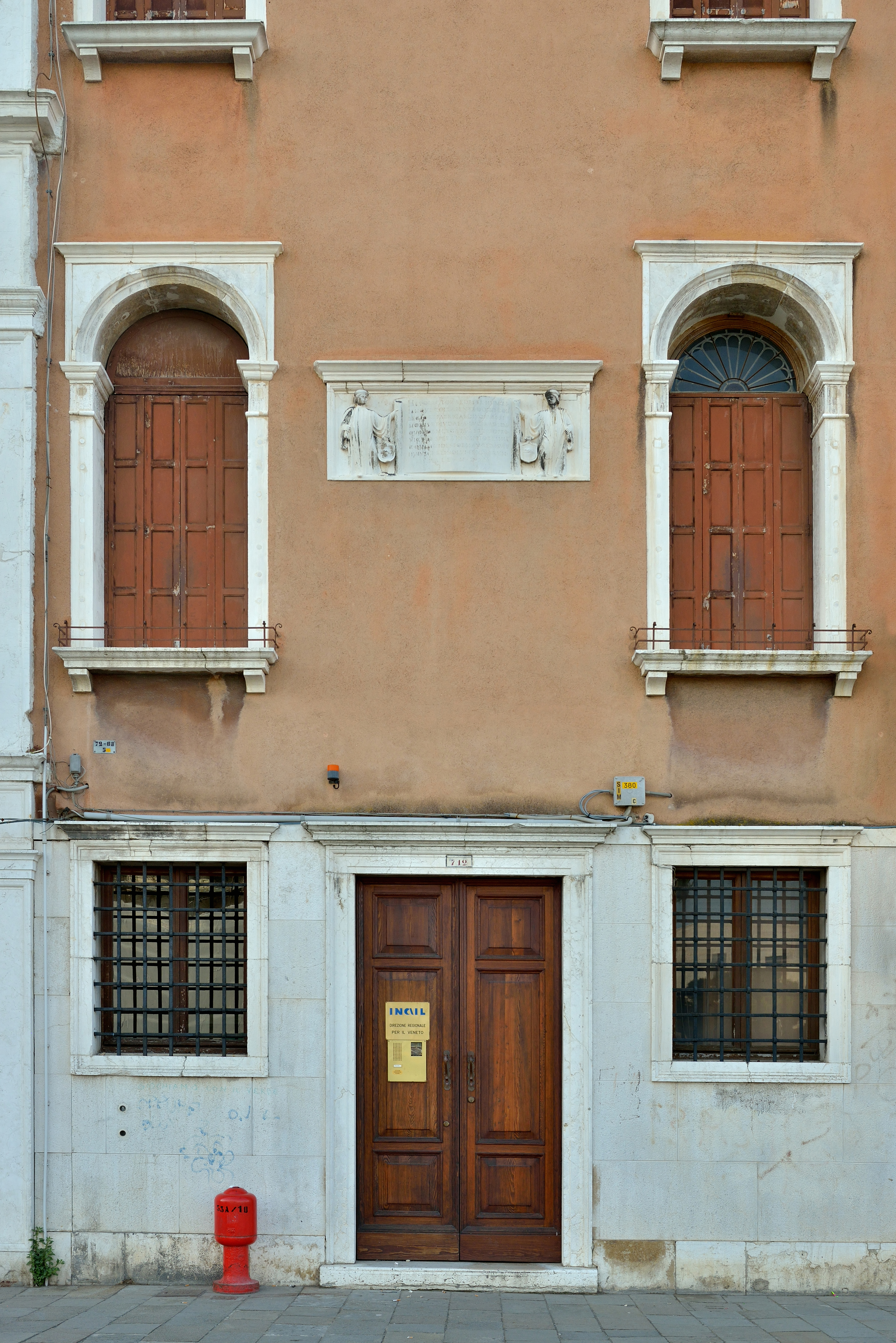
The facade details
