= Palazzo Foscari Contarini =

Palace in Venice, Italy

Coordinates: 45°26′27″N 12°19′22″E

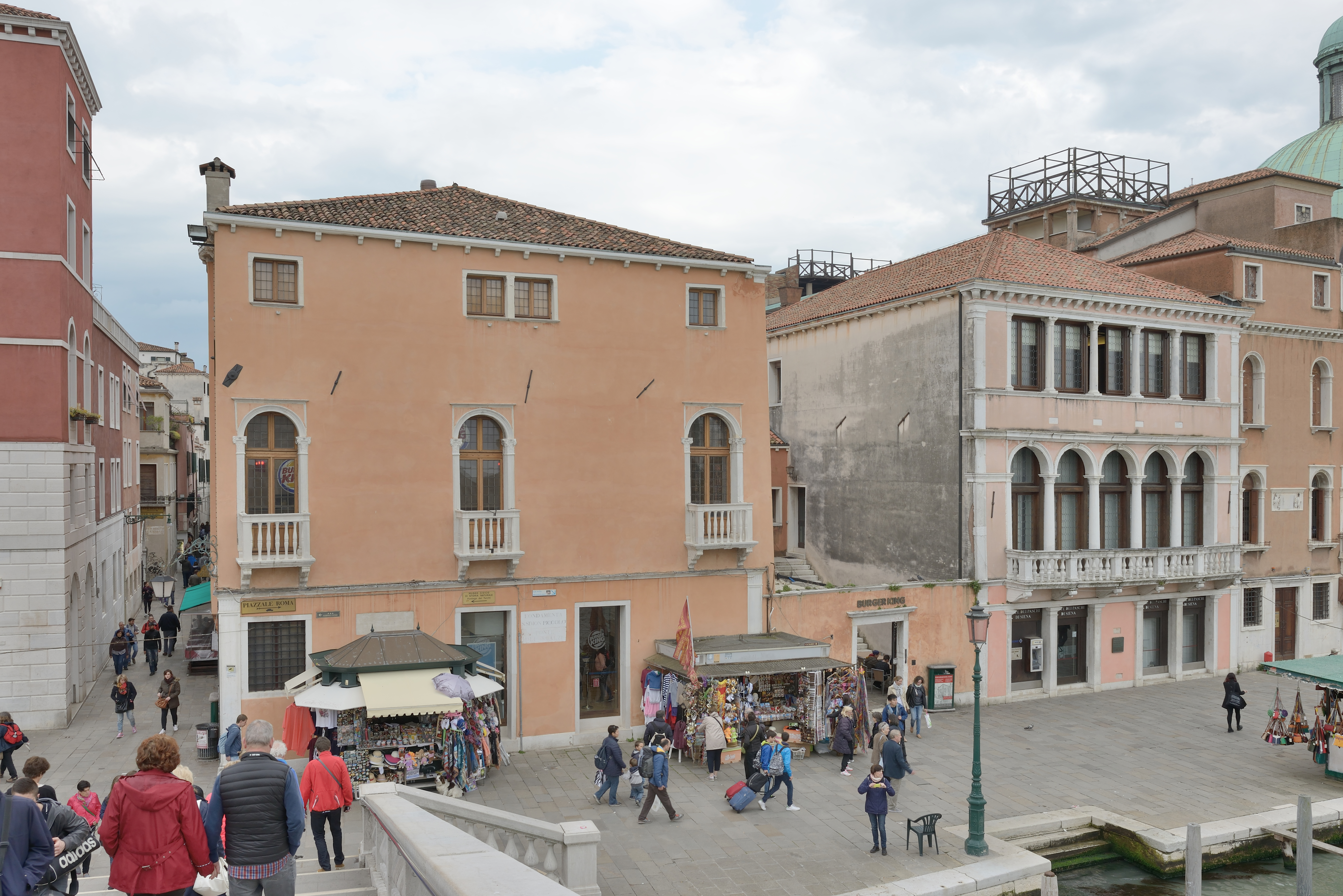
Palazzo Foscari Contarini along the Grand Canal

Palazzo Foscari Contarini is a Renaissance style palace in Venice, Italy, in the sestiere of Santa Croce (N.A. 713-714), facing the Grand Canal, near the Ponte degli Scalzi and Palazzo Adoldo.

== History ==
Built in the 16th century as a U shape architectural complex, Palazzo Foscari Contarini underwent various modifications in the following centuries, and also left to itself until in 1951 it has been bought by INAIL Istituto Nazionale per l'Assicurazione contro gli Infortuni sul Lavoro e le Malattie Professionali (the Italian National Institute for work injuries prevention), which provided to its whole restoration. Its Renaissance character can specially be told by the right side façade showing nice loggiato arcades at the first floor.

== Bibliography ==
- AA VV, Palazzo Foscari Contarini. Un restauro per Venezia, INAIL, 1989.
