= Palazzo Grassi =

Building in Venice, Italy

Coordinates: 45°26′01″N 12°19′40″E

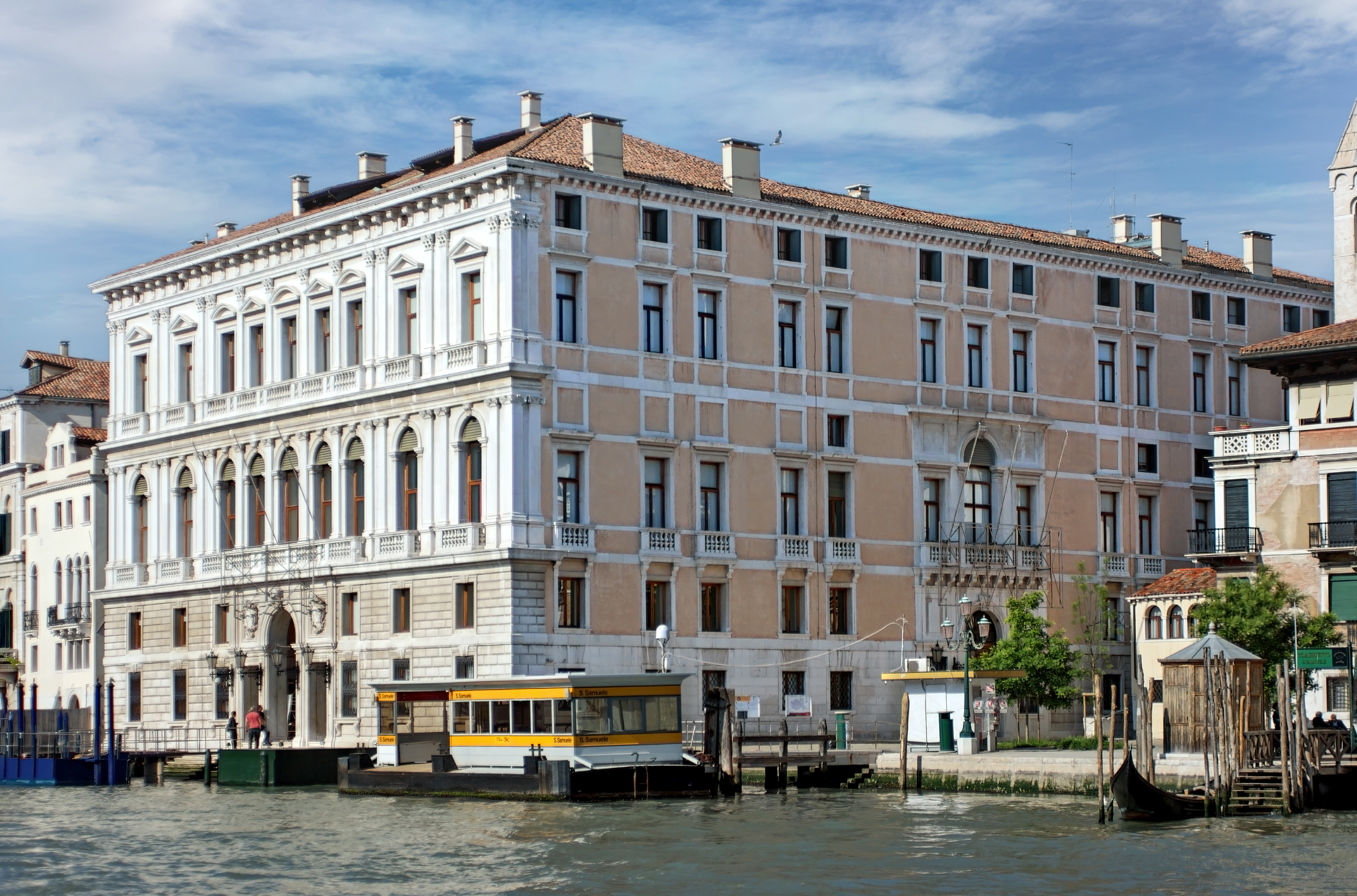
- Palazzo Grassi, facade on Grand Canal

General information
- Architectural style: Venetian Classical style
- Construction started: 1748
- Completed: 1772
- Owner: François Pinault

Design and construction
- Architect: Giorgio Massari

Palazzo Grassi (also known as the Palazzo Grassi-Stucky) is a building in the Venetian Classical style located on the Grand Canal of Venice (Italy), between the Palazzo Moro Lin and the campo San Samuele.

== History ==
=== First owners ===
During the 16th century, the building was owned by the Cini family. In February 1605, Alamanno Aragon Hocheppan, grandson of Cosimo I, acquired it. The Grassi family first moved in the building in 1655.

=== Grassi family ===
The Palazzo Grassi was designed by Giorgio Massari, and rebuilt between 1748 and 1772. Massari started the Palazzo while he was finishing the Ca' Rezzonico on the opposite bank of the river.

A latecomer among the palaces on the Grand Canal of Venice, Palazzo Grassi has an academic classical style that is in contrast to the surrounding Byzantine Romanesque and Baroque Venetian palazzi. It has a formal palace façade, constructed of white marble, but lacks the lower mercantile openings typical of many Venetian patrician palaces. The main stairwell is frescoed by Michelangelo Morlaiter and Francesco Zanchi, and the ceilings are decorated by the artists Giambattista Canal and Christian Griepenkerl. The Palazzo Grassi was the last palace to be built on the Grand Canal before the fall of the Venetian Republic, and the largest-sited.

=== Fiat-Agnelli ===
The Grassi family sold the palazzo in 1840, with ownership that followed passing through many different individuals. In 1857, the building was bought by Baron Simeone De Sina. A small scenic garden was created adjacent to the building.

In 1951, the building became the International Centre of Arts and Costume. The adjacent garden was turned into an open-air theatre (Teatrino), which was finally covered in the 1960s. The International Centre for Arts and Costume closed in 1983.

The Palazzo was purchased by the Fiat Group in 1983, under the late chairman Gianni Agnelli, and it underwent a complete restoration overseen by architect Gae Aulenti. The group's aim was to transform Palazzo Grassi into an exhibition hall for the visual arts. It continues to be used as an art gallery today.

Between 1984 and 1990, Pontus Hultén was in charge of the art museum which also contained a 600-seat outdoor theatre. In 1990, the architect Aldo Rossi received the Pritzker Architecture Prize in this building.

=== Pinault Collection ===
In May 2005, the French entrepreneur François Pinault bought the Palazzo Grassi for 29 million euros. The remodeling of the building was assigned to the Japanese architect Tadao Ando. The Palazzo reopened in April 2006 with the exhibit Where Are We Going?. The Palazzo is divided in 40 rooms, providing 5,000 m^{2} of exhibition floor. Jean-Jacques Aillagon was the museum's first director.

In 2007, François Pinault acquired the Punta della Dogana to transform it into a contemporary art museum paired with the Palazzo Grassi. The replanning of the building, which was in disrepair when acquired, was also assigned to Tadao Ando. The Punta della Dogana reopened after 14 months of renovation.

In 2013, Tadao Ando redesigned the Teatrino into a 225-seat auditorium.

=== Exhibitions ===
Since 2006, Palazzo Grassi has been presenting temporary exhibitions from the Pinault Collection:
- Where Are We Going? A selection of works from the Pinault Collection, curated by Alison Gingeras, April 2006 - October 2006
- Picasso, la joie de vivre. 1945-1948, curated by Jean-Louis Andral, November 2006 - March 2007
- François Pinault Collection: a Post-Pop Selection, curated by Alison Gingeras, November 2006 - March 2007
- Sequence 1 – Painting and Sculpture from the François Pinault Collection, curated by Alison Gingeras, May 2007 – November 2007
- Rome and the barbarians. The Birth of a New World, curated by Jean-Jacques Aillagon, January 2008 – July 2008
- Italics. Italian Art Between Traditions and Revolutions, 1968-2008, curated by Francesco Bonami, September 2008 - March 2009
- Mapping the Studio: Artists from the François Pinault Collection, curated by Francesco Bonami and Alison Gingeras. Presented at Palazzo Grassi and at Punta della Dogana. June 2009 – April 2011
- The World Belongs to You, curated by Caroline Bourgeois, June 2011 – February 2012
- Madame Fisscher, solo exhibition by Urs Fischer curated in collaboration with Caroline Bourgeois, April 2012 – July 2012
- Voice of Images, curated by Caroline Bourgeois, August 2012 – January 2013
- Rudolf Stingel, solo exhibition curated by the artist in collaboration with Elena Geuna, April 2013 – January 2014
- The Illusion of Light, curated by Caroline Bourgeois, April 2014 – January 2015
- Irving Penn, Resonance, curated by Pierre Apraxine and Matthieu Humery, April 2014 – January 2015
- Martial Raysse, curated by Caroline Bourgeois in collaboration with the artist, April 2015 – November 2015
- Sigmar Polke, curated by Elena Geuna and Guy Tosatto, April 2016 – November 2016
- Treasures from the Wreck of the Unbelievable, Damien Hirst, curated by Elena Geuna. Presented at Palazzo Grassi and at Punta della Dogana. April 2017 – December 2017
- Cows by the Water, Albert Oehlen, curated by Caroline Bourgeois, April 2018 - January 2019
- La Pelle, Luc Tuymans, curated by the artist in collaboration with Caroline Bourgeois, March 2019 - January 2020

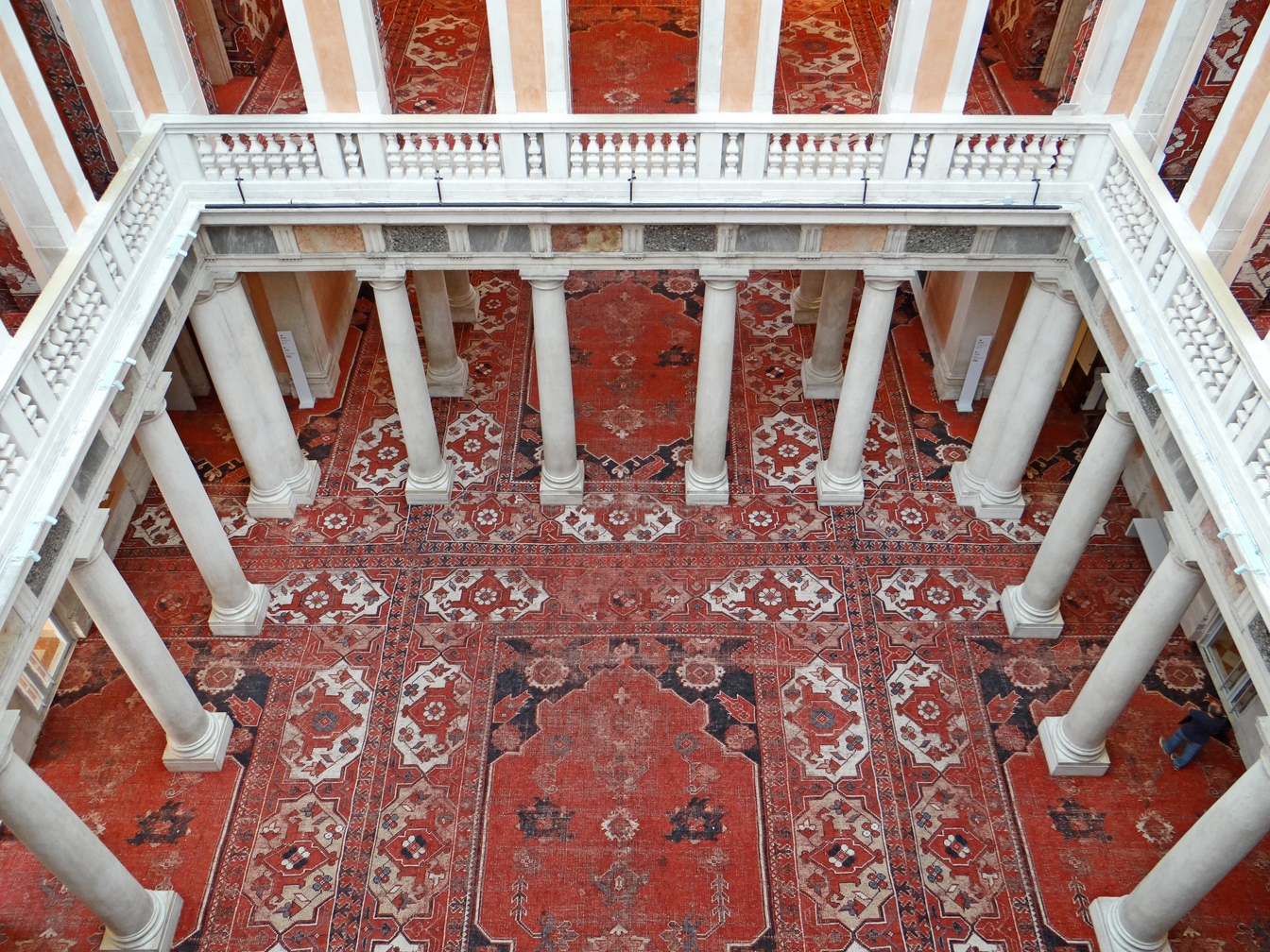
Rudolf Stingel, 2013.

== Building ==
The Palazzo Grassi was designed by Giorgio Massari. The main stairwell was frescoed by Michelangelo Morlaiter and Francesco Zanchi. The ceilings were decorated by Giovanni Battista Canal and Christian Griepenkerl.

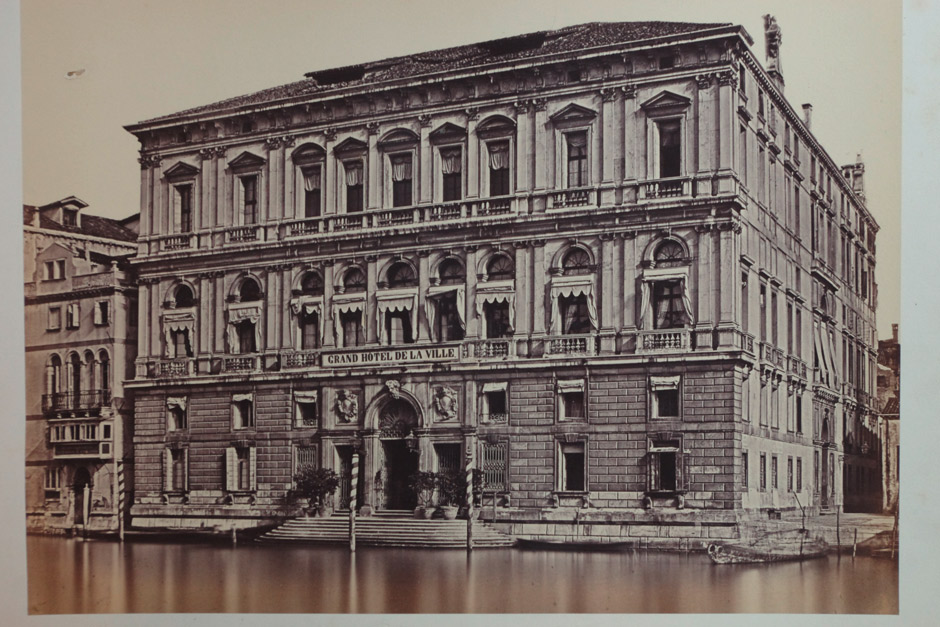
Palazzo Grassi in the 1850s.

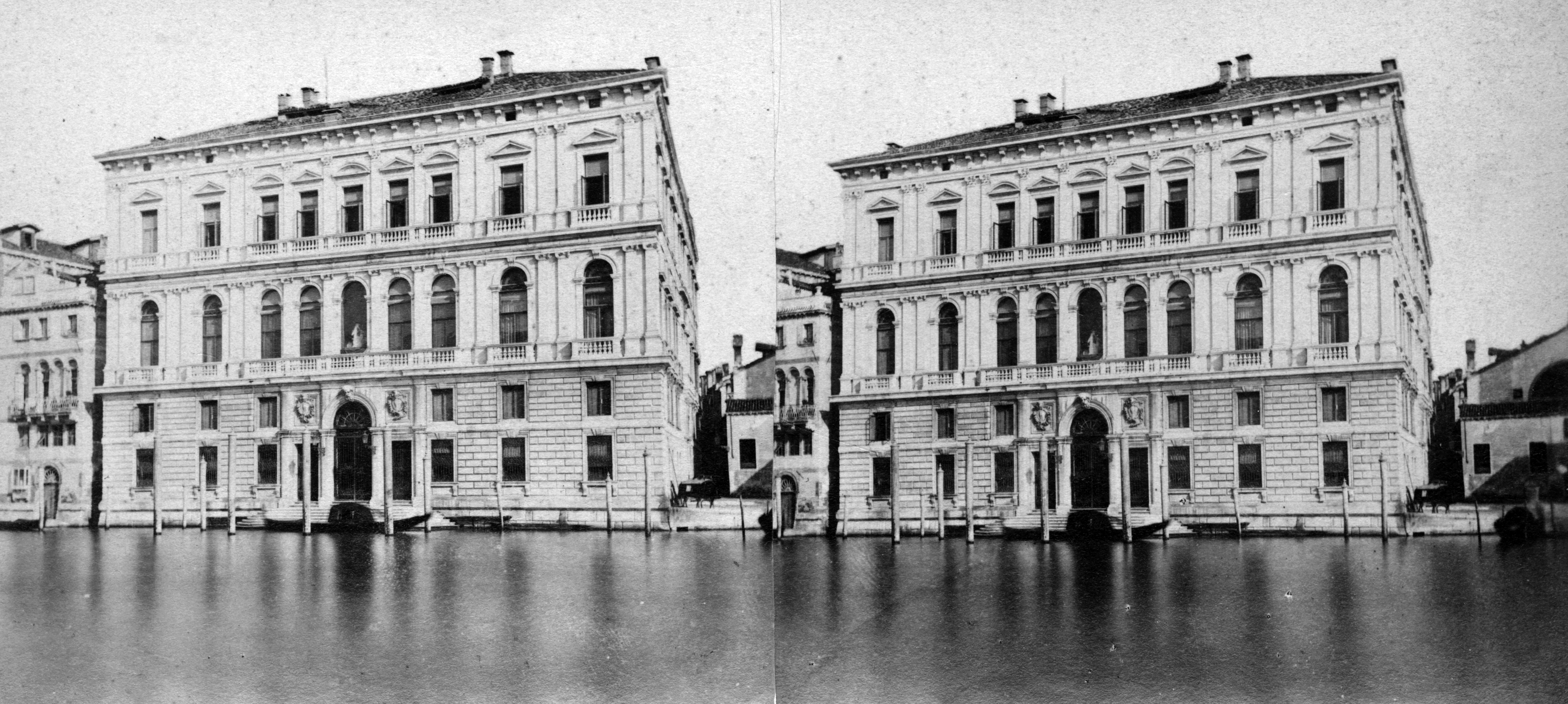
Palazzo Grassi in 1900.

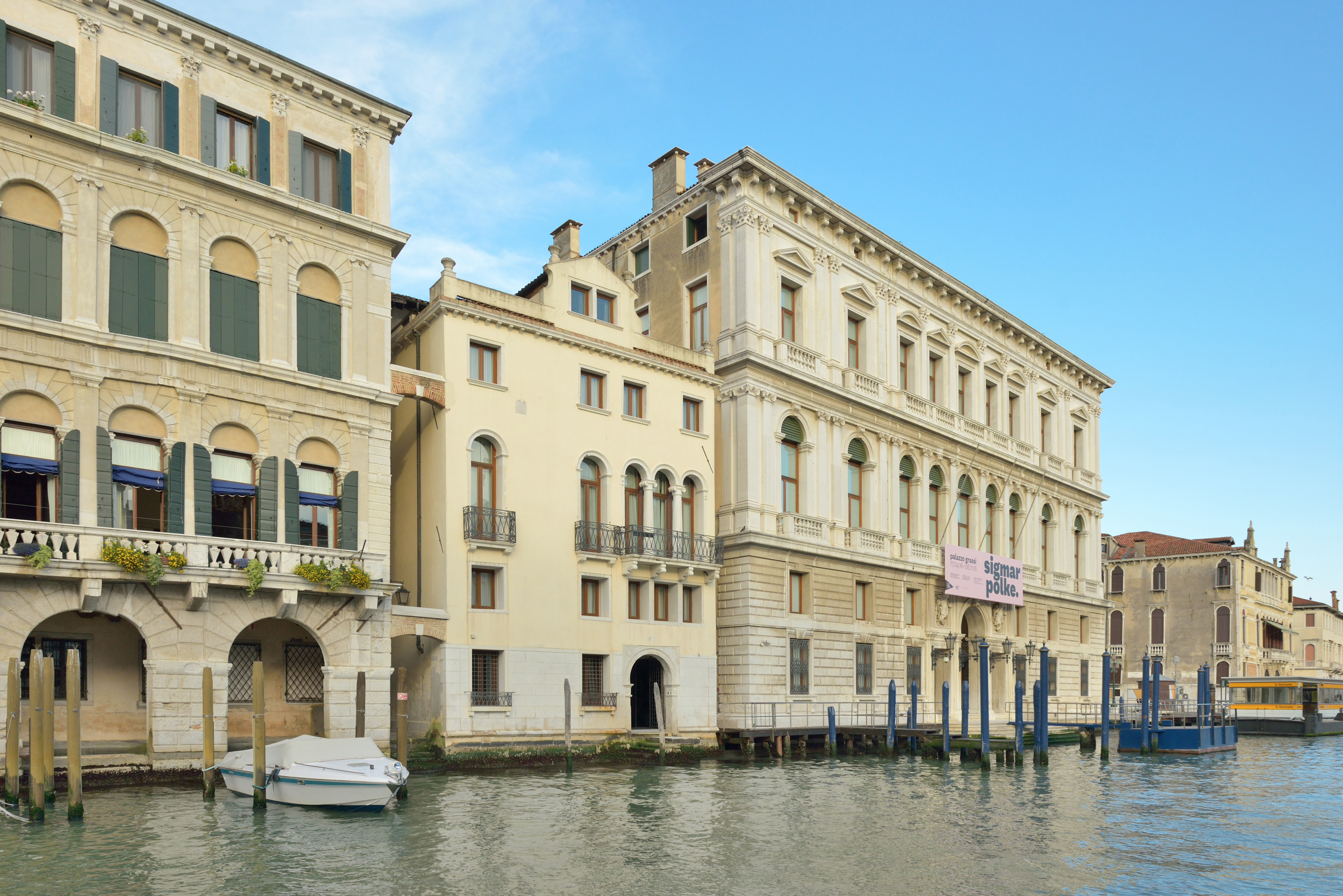
Facade from Grand Canal.

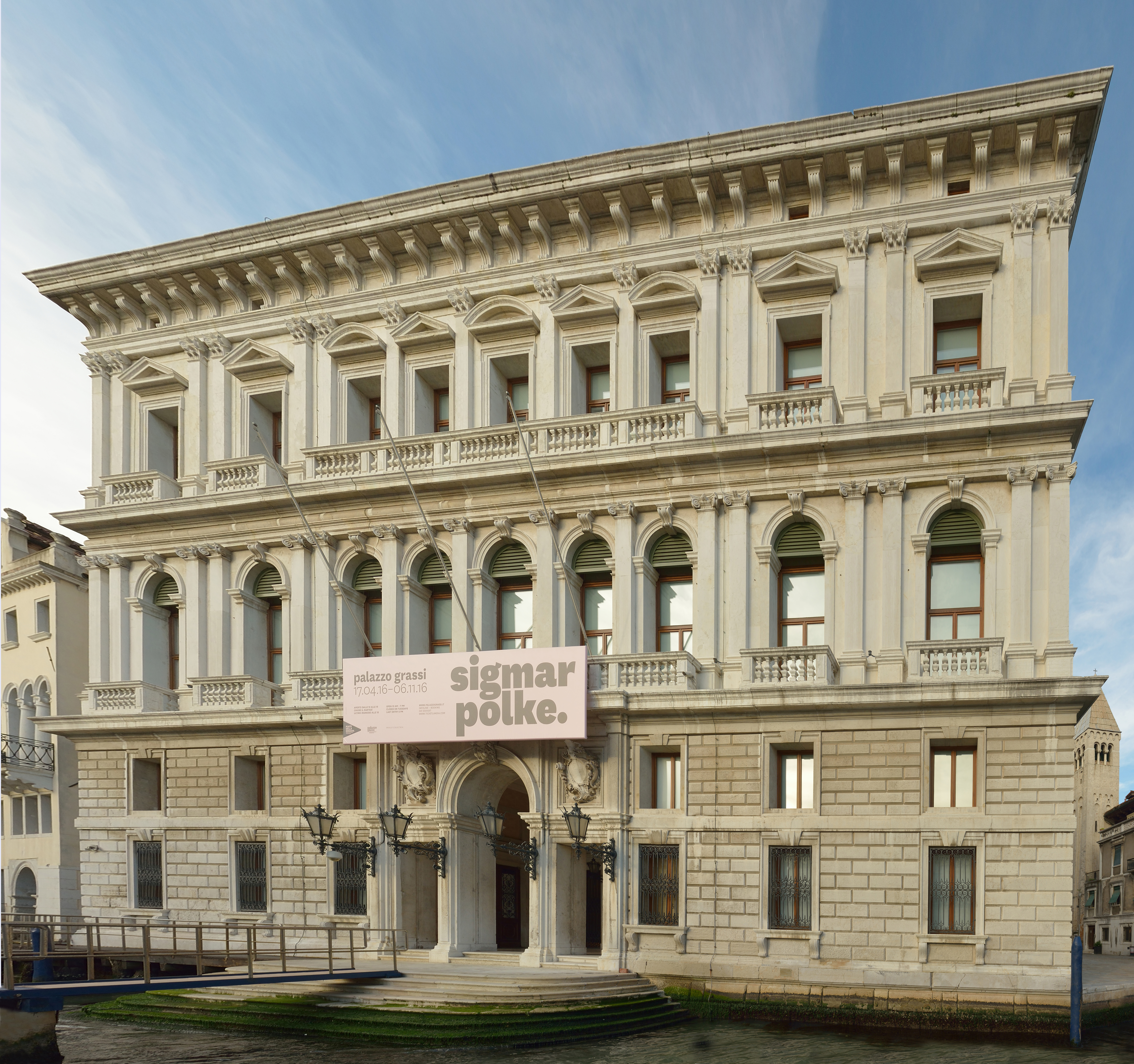
Facade from Grand Canal.

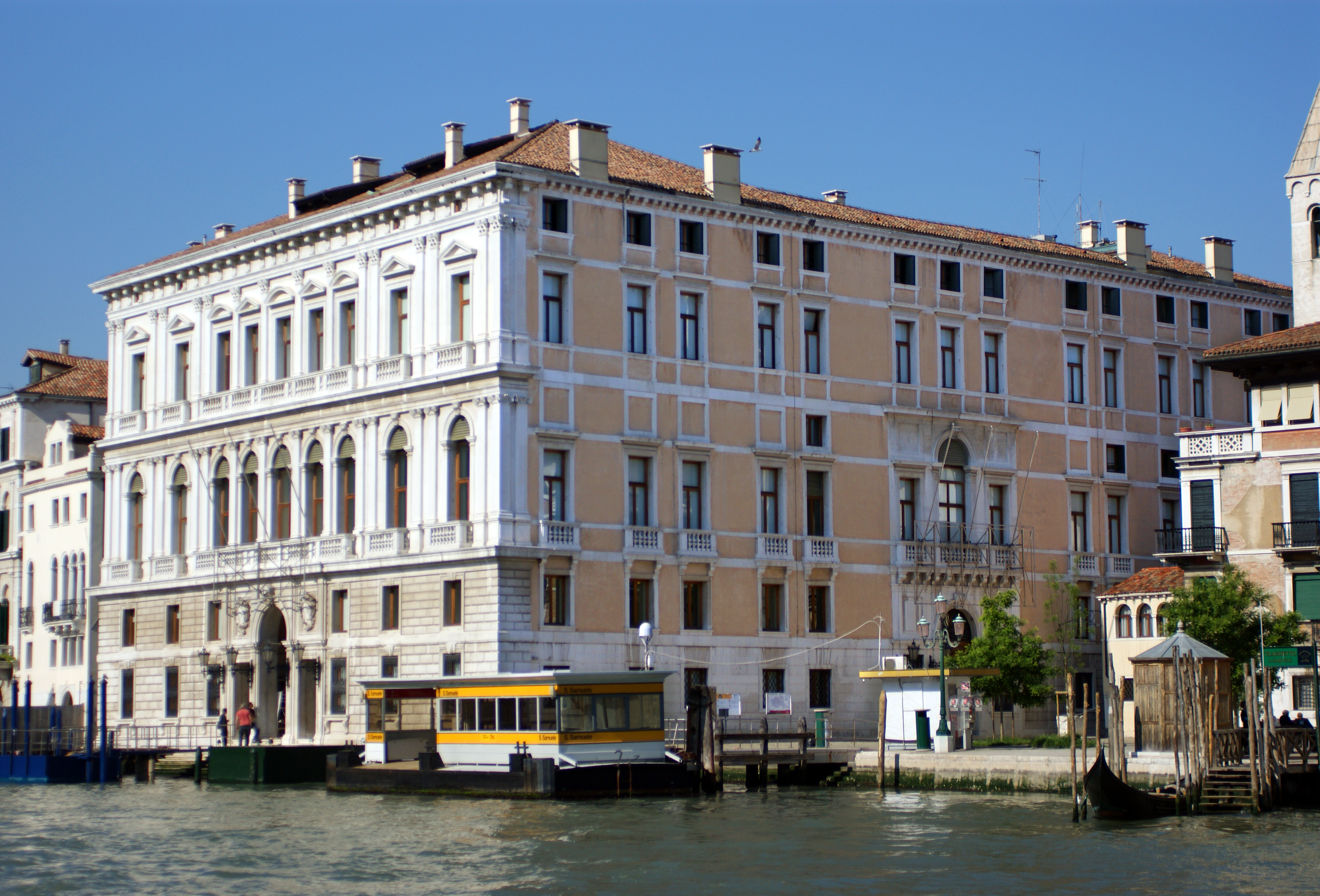
Facade from Grand Canal at night.

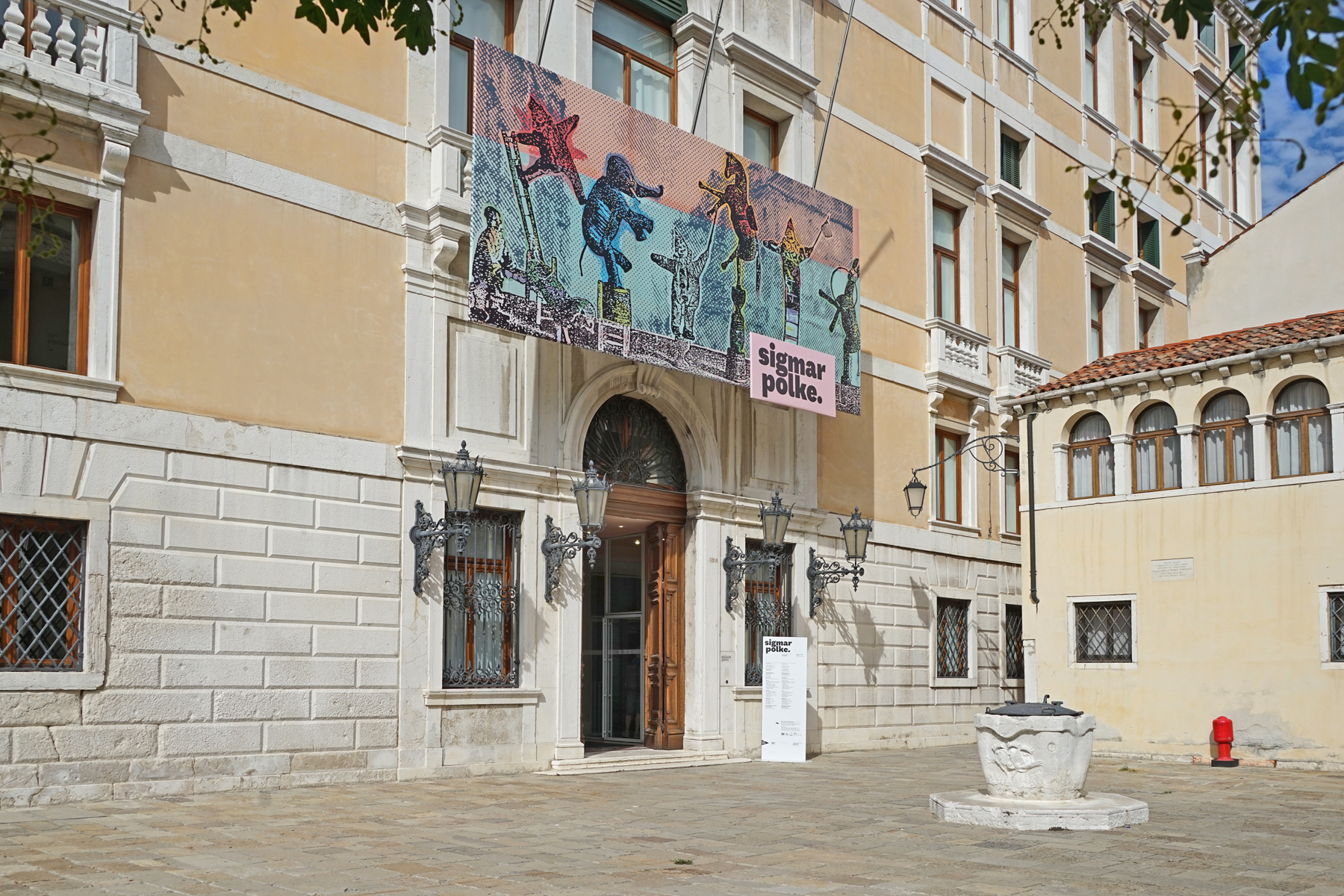
Building entrance.

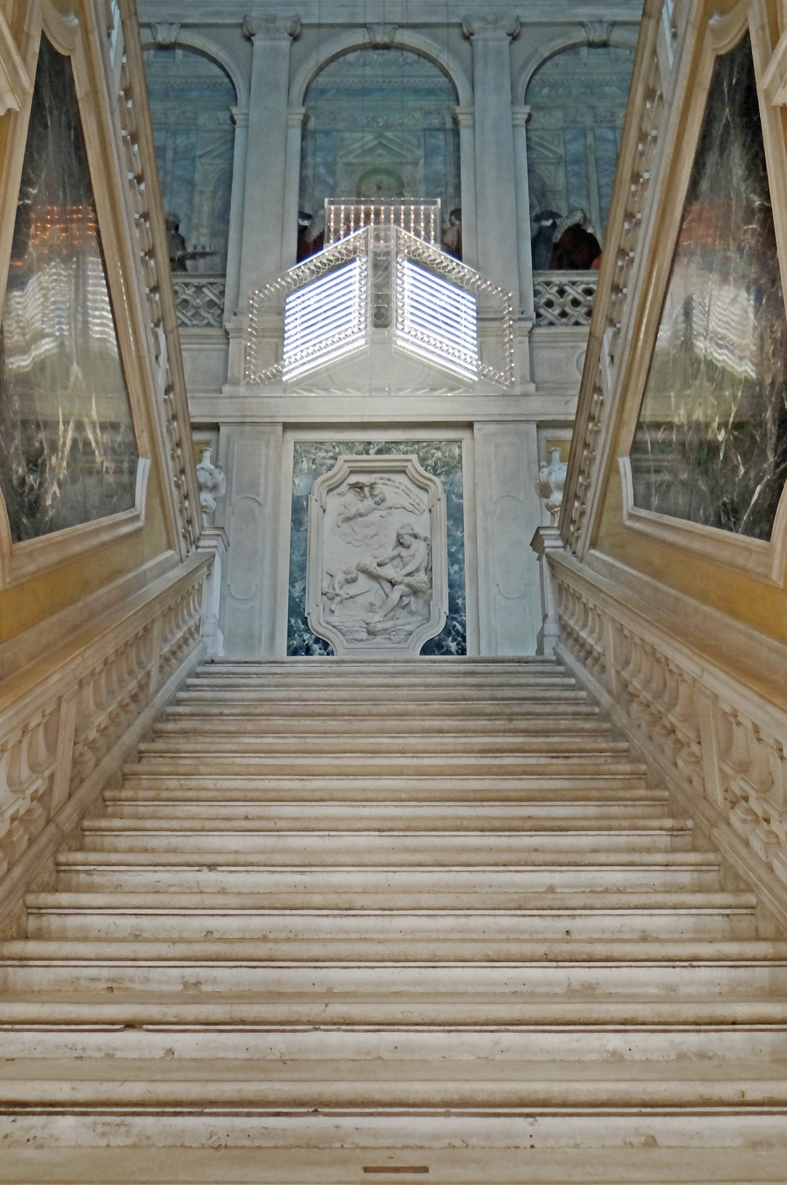
Main stairs of the Palazzo.

== See also ==
- Giorgio Massari
- Gianni Agnelli
- François Pinault
- Punta della Dogana

== Bibliography ==
- Philip Jodidio, Tadao Ando Venice: The Pinault Collection at the Palazzo Grassi and the Punta Della Dogana, ed. Skira Rizzoli, 28 September 2010
