= Palazzo Giustinian Loredan =

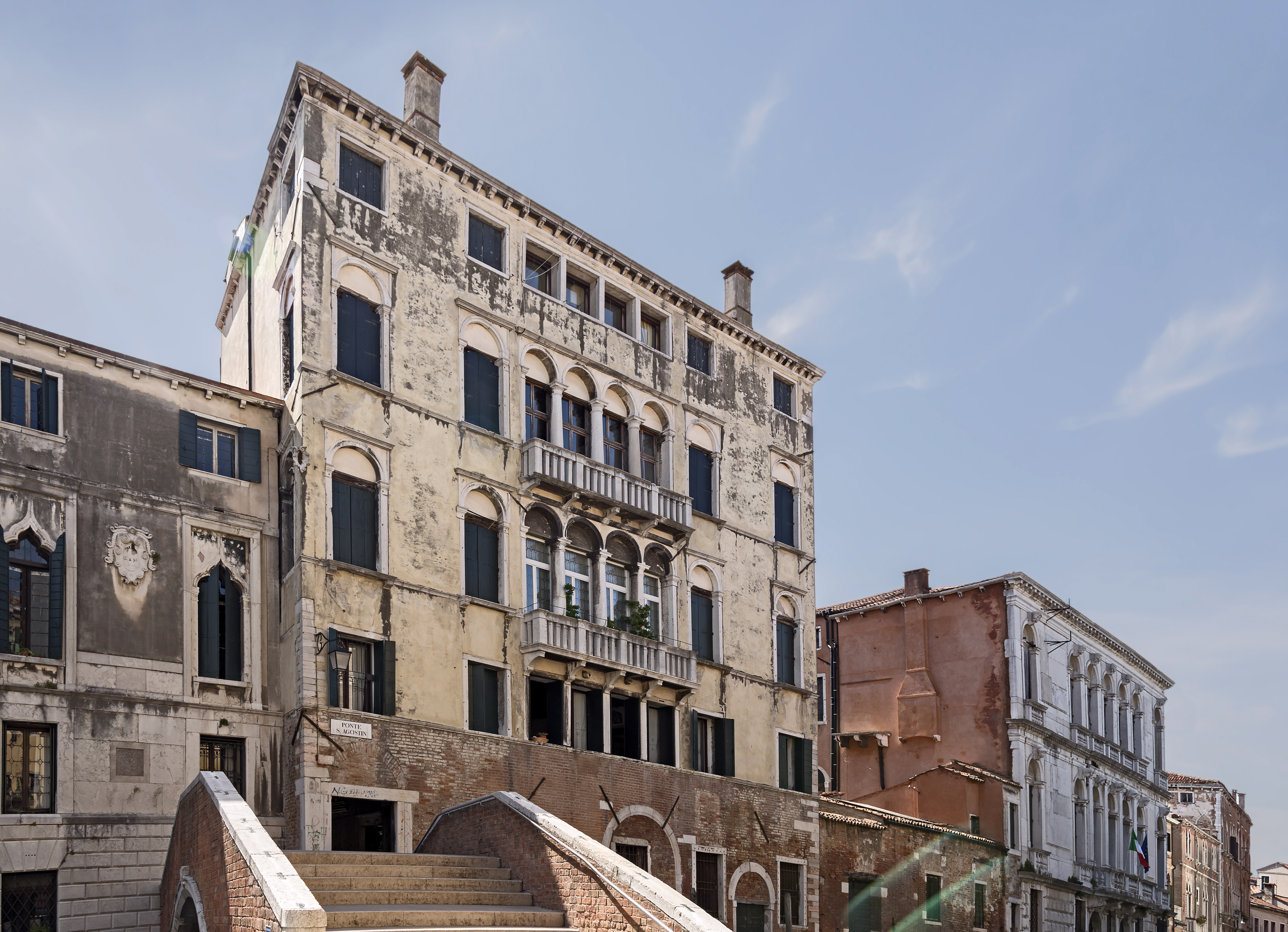
- Interactive map of the Palazzo Giustinian Loredan area

General information
- Architectural style: Venetian Renaissance
- Location: Venice, Italy, Sotoportego del Pozzo Longo 2351, San Polo
- Completed: 16th century
- Owner: Loredan family

Palazzo Giustinian Loredan a S. Stin is a 16th-century palace of the Loredan family located in the San Polo district of Venice.

It was built by the Cicogna family on a pre-existing 14th century building, and ownership of the palace changed multiple times throughout history. The palace is today owned by a branch of the Loredan family.

== Architecture ==
The large building consists of the pé pian (ground floor), a mezzanine, two noble floors and another mezzanine. The stylistic features are typical of a sixteenth-century residence, although it is established that the construction involved the renovation of a previous Venetian-Byzantine fourteenth-century factory. The austere main facade overlooks the Rio de Sant'Agostin and is particularly notable for the very simple and at the same time striking solution adopted by the architect for the construction of the pé pian, completely alien to the context of the upper part of the palace. The interiors are still well preserved today and are notable in particular for the refined stuccoes and the magnificent floors made with the Venetian technique.
