= Palazzo Benzi Zecchini, Venice =

15th-century palace in Venice, Italy

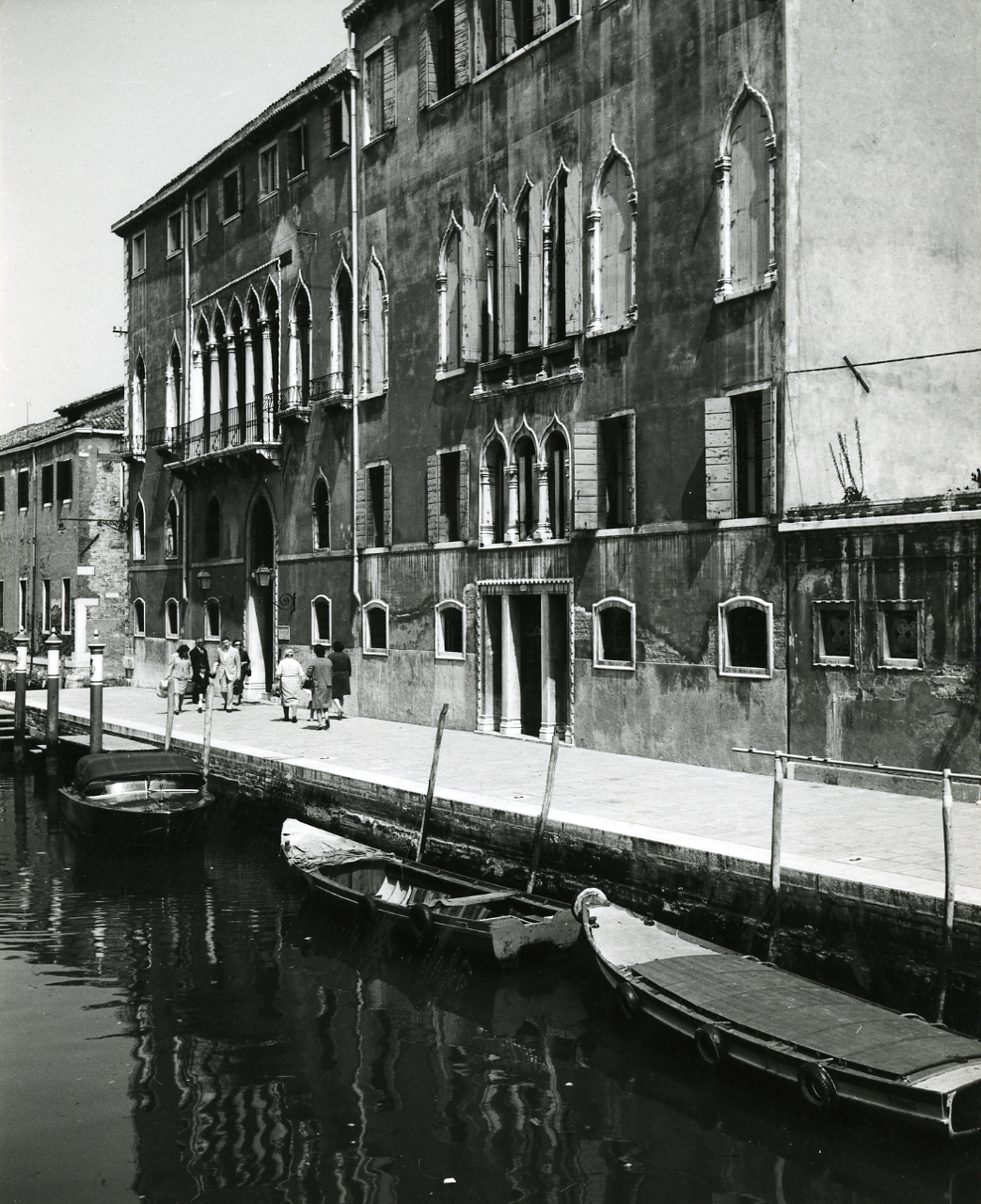
Palazzo Benzi Zecchini and Palazzo Bartolini in 1968

The Palazzo Girardi Zecchini or Benzi Zecchini all Madonna dell'Orto is a 15th-century palace located near the church of Madonna dell'Orto in the sestiere of Cannaregio of Venice, Italy.

== History ==
The palace was founded by the Lioncini family at the edge of the city, and became property of Mazza family by 1575. The Girardi family, originally from Bergamo, which later appropriated the Zecchini name by marriage, rebuilt the palace in part. Their heraldic symbols was found sculpted on the well in the courtyard. But, construction proceeded slowly, and marble that had been intended for this palace was sold to Pesaro family for their palace at San Stae parish in 1635.

The Benzi name was attached to the Zecchini when Valeria, daughter of Laura Girardi Zecchini and Benigno Benzi from a Turinese family married in 1635. In 1828, Elisabetta Casser, the aged widow of the last Benzi-Zecchini left palace in 1837 to Casa di Ricovero di Venezia, an orphanage, where babies could be dropped off by basket from the canal.

A Villa Benzi Zecchini in the town limits of Caerano di San Marco was also willed by Elisabetta to the comune for the care of the infirm. The villa is now used for cultural events and exhibitions.
