= Palazzo Molin Querini =

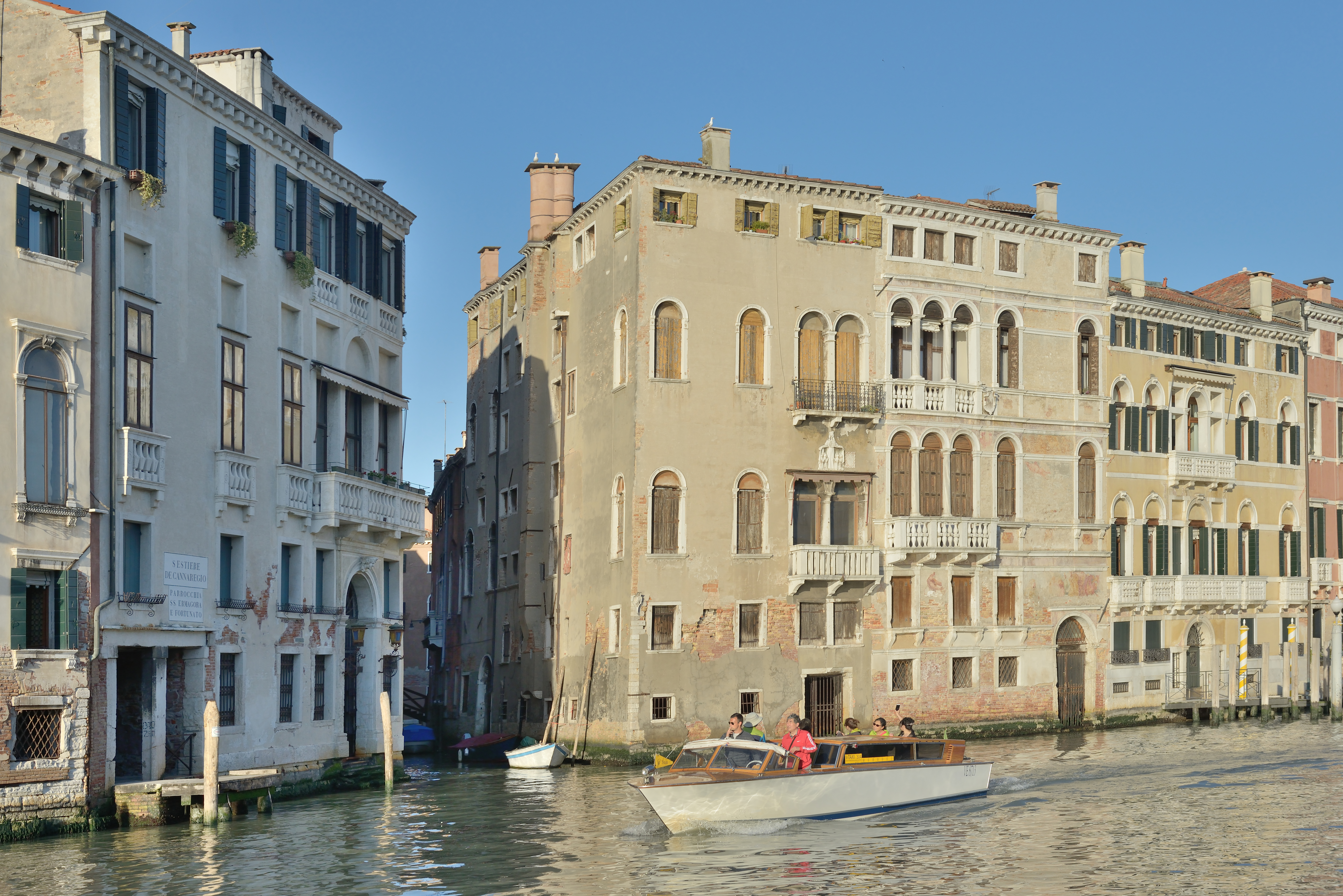
The palace Molin Querini on the left and the Rio de la Madalena canal seen from the Canal Grande

The Palazzo Molin Querini is a Baroque-style palace on the Grand Canal, between the Palazzo Emo alla Maddalena and the Rio della Maddalena in the sestiere of Cannaregio, in Venice, Italy. It is also called the Palazzo Molin alla Maddalena or Palazzo Querini. It is located in the parish of the church of La Maddalena.

It was built in the 17th century. His family owned the palace into the 19th century.
