= Palazzo Emo at Maddalena =

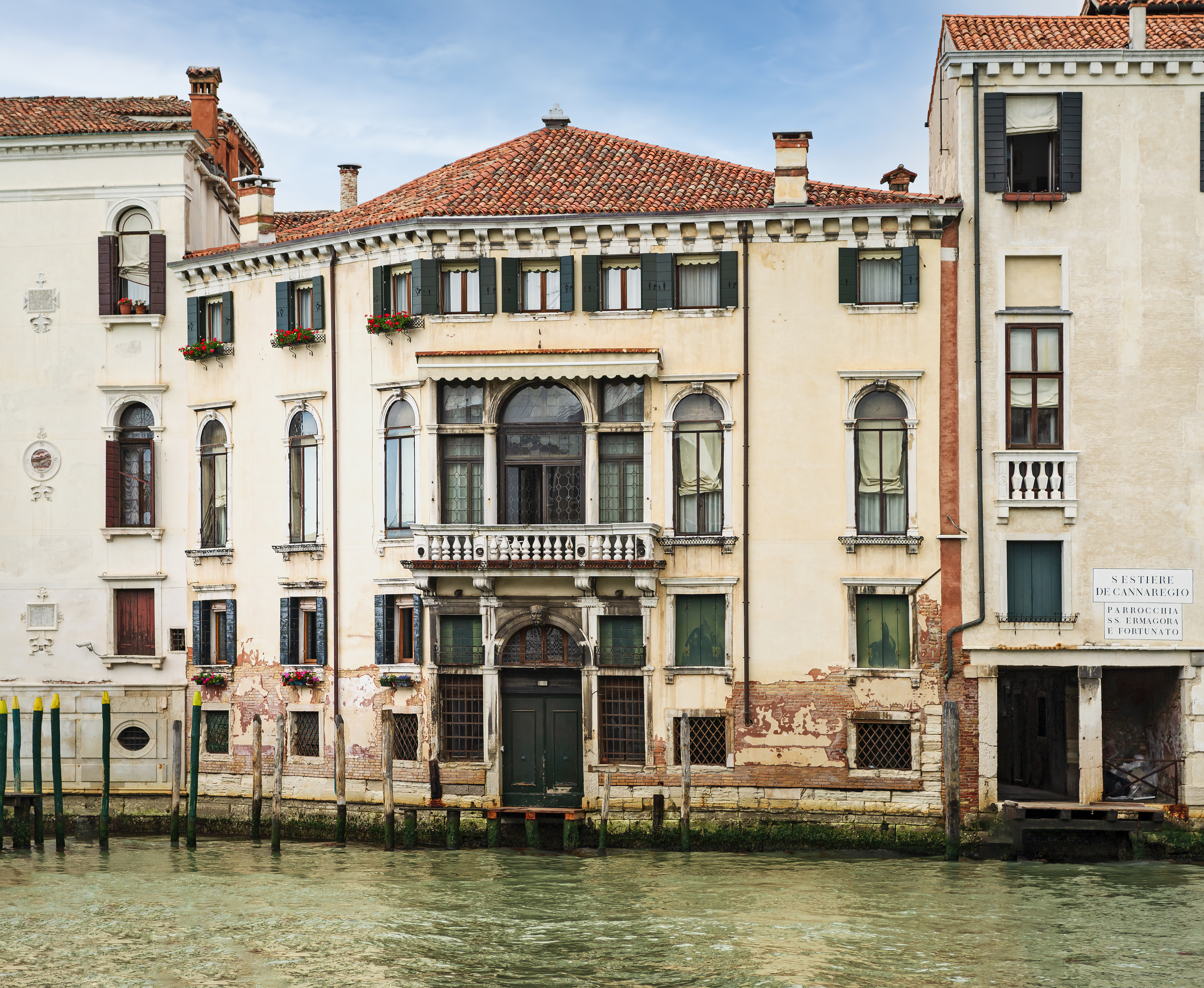
- The palace in 2017
- Interactive map of the Palazzo Emo at Maddalena area

General information
- Architectural style: Baroque
- Location: Grand Canal, Cannaregio, Venice, Italy
- Coordinates: 45°26′32″N 12°19′51″E
- Construction started: 17th century

The Palazzo Emo alla Maddalena is a Baroque-style palace on the Grand Canal, between the Palazzo Molin Querini and the Palazzo Soranzo Piovene in the sestiere of Cannaregio, in Venice, Italy. It is located in the church parish of La Maddalena.

It was built in the 17th century and occupied by the family of the Admiral Angelo Emo. His family owned the palace into the 19th century. There are at least three other palaces related to the Emo family on the Grand Canal:

1. Palazzo Emo Diedo
2. Palazzo Emo a San Leonardo (Cannaregio)
3. Palazzo Barozzi Emo Treves de Bonfili
