= Palazzo Muti Baglioni, Venice =

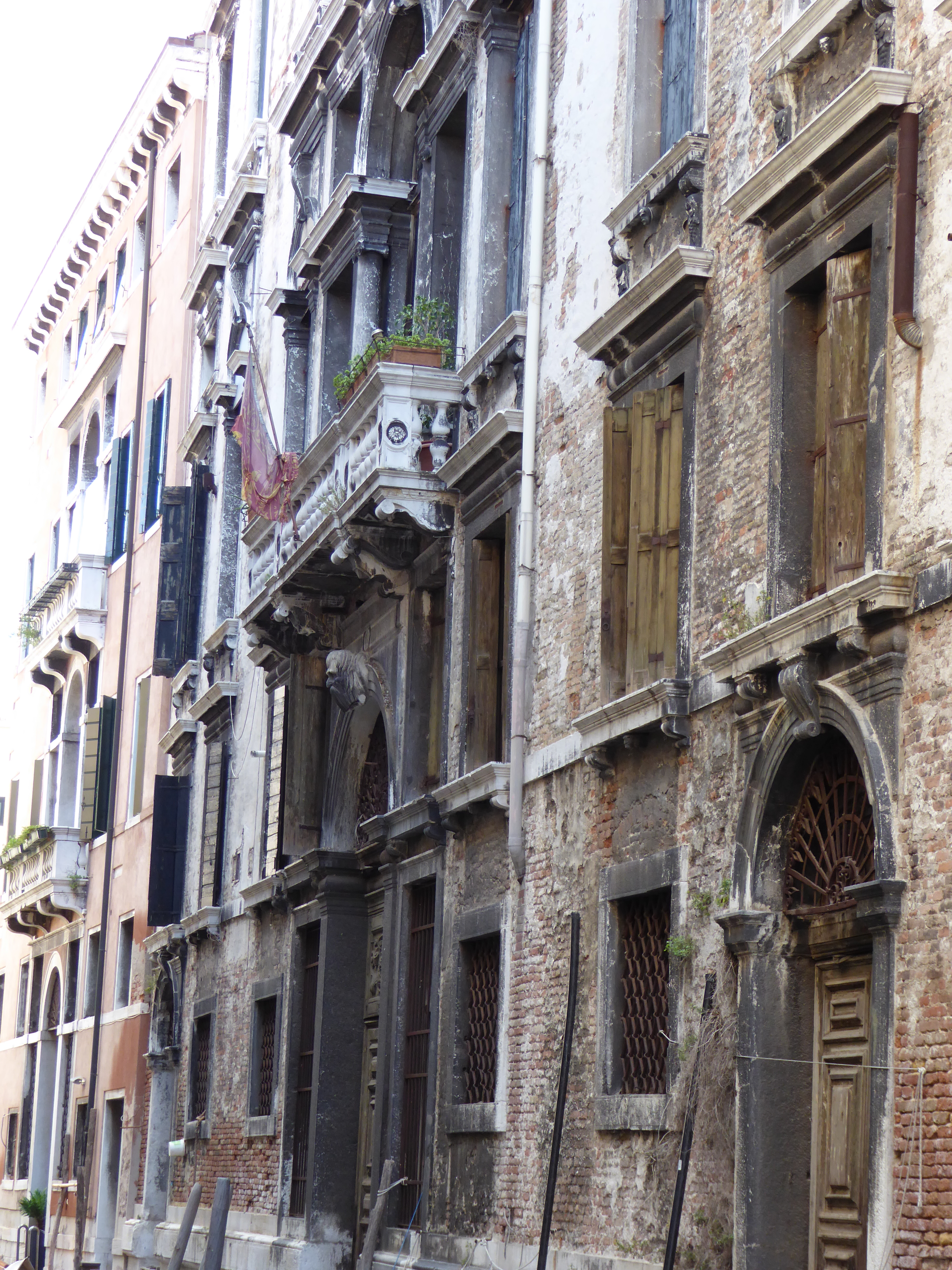
Palazzo Muti Baglioni (Venice)

The Palazzo Muti Baglioni is a Baroque architecture palace located near San Cassiano in the Sestiere San Polo of Venice, Italy.

In 1602, at the site of some businesses, this palace was erected by the Muti family. By the 1670s, the palace was sold to the Acquisti family, who had been admitted in 1686 into the Venetian aristocracy. It was sold by 1736 to the Vezzi family, and that year a fire that arose during prolonged wedding festivities spread to this palace from a neighboring building belonging to a jurist named Angelo Tirabosco.

Contemporary journals document that on October 4, 1742, the exiled Francesco III d'Este, Duke of Modena found temporary lodging in this palace, after being exiled for siding with France and Spain in the War of the Austrian Succession. The duke's numerous courtiers were housed nearby. The reports mockingly report that his portly wife, the Princess of Massa, Charlotte Aglaé d'Orléans, had needed a sedan chair to raise her up to her apartment. The palace rental at the time was 1000 ducats per year.

Subsequently, the palace became property of Giovanni Antonio Baglioni, who was admitted to the patriciate by 1716, after being enriched by the publishing trade. This family owned the palace into the 19th century.

The exterior facade has an asymmetric array of windows and a serlian window. The interior has frescoes by Giovanni Battista Crosato and Jacopo Guarana. It possesses original stucco decoration of the 18th century. The palace is privately owned, and the upper floor is divided into apartments.
