= Palazzo Moro Lin (San Polo) =

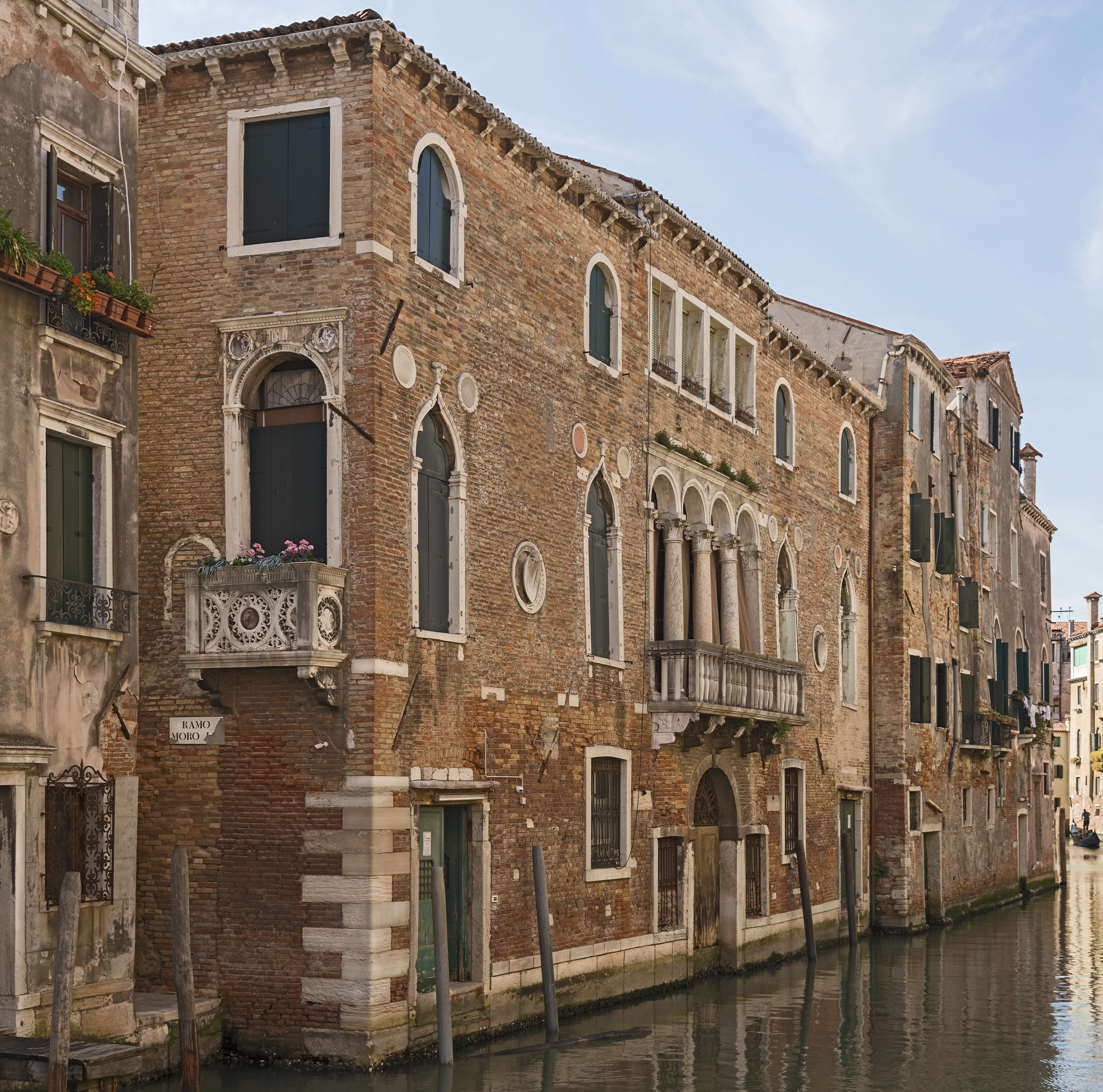
- Façade on the rio (canal) of San Polo
- Interactive map of the Palazzo Moro Lin area

General information
- Architectural style: Gothic architecture
- Location: San Polo, Calle Morolin, 2672, San Polo, Venice, Italy
- Coordinates: 45°26′13.46″N 12°19′43.43″E
- Construction started: 15th century
- Completed: 16th century

Height
- Top floor: 3

Palazzo Moro Lin, also known as Palazzo Morolin Michiel Olivo, is a Venetian palace located in the San Polo sestiere.

== History ==
The building, along with the homonymous Palazzo Moro Lin in San Marco, belonged to the Moro Lin family, one of the oldest patrician families in Venice, which was engaged in trade with Holland, Spain and India and was admitted to the Great Council in 1297.

Today the palace is privately owned.

== Description ==
It is an ancient Gothic building divided into three floors: pé pian (ground floor), soler nobile (second floor) and the soler sottotetto (third floor). At the pé pian, on the façade of the building overlooking the rio de San Polo (canal of San Polo), there are three water entrances from the canal (porte da mar). The main door is round arched and placed in a central position while the two lateral ones are smaller and with architraves, originally performing a service function.

At the soler pian there is a promiscuity of architectural elements: on the side finds place a Lombard fashioned window with polychrome paterae and barriers, while in the center of the main façade there is the Renaissance four-lancet window with round arches, flanked on the sides by single pointed arches. Two marble rounds are placed at the end of the typical rose window.

From the side of Calle Moro Lin and adjacent to Corte Moro Lin, there is an ogival three-light window outside the large internal courtyard.

== See also ==
- Palazzo Moro Lin (San Marco)
