= Palazzo Loredan Gheltoff =

14th century early Gothic palace in Venice

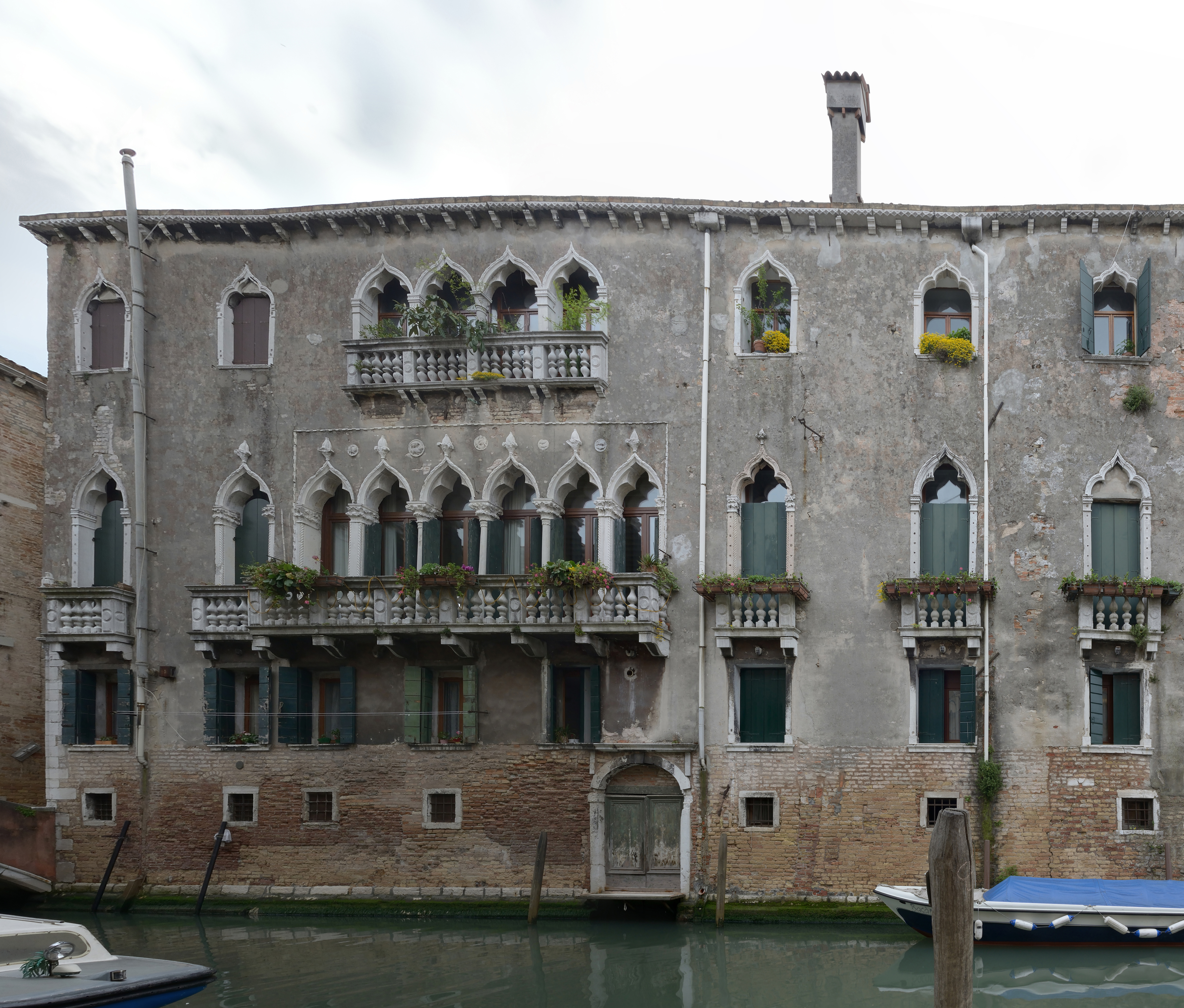
- Interactive map of the Palazzo Loredan Gheltoff area

General information
- Architectural style: Venetian Gothic
- Location: Venice, Italy, Calle dell' Aseo (ai Ormesini) 1863/64, Cannaregio
- Completed: 14th/15th century
- Affiliation: House of Loredan

Palazzo Loredan Gheltoff is a 14th-century early Gothic palace of the Loredan family located at Calle dell'Aseo in the Cannaregio district of Venice.

== Architecture ==
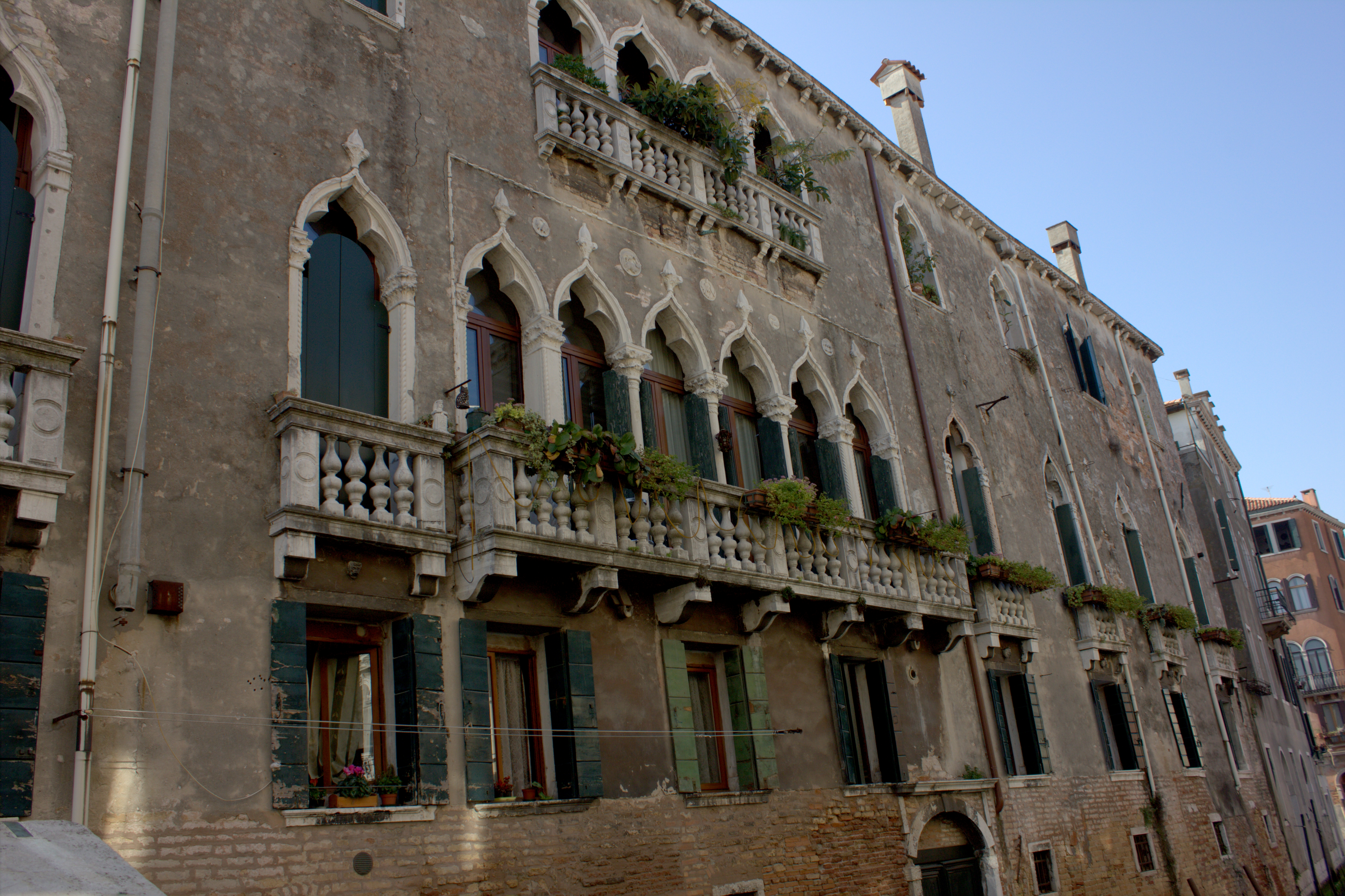
Palazzo Loredan Gheltoff

The Palazzo Loredan Gheltoff is an imposing Gothic palace from the 14th to 15th centuries in which the archaic version of the "L" structure still appears with a spacious single-cell wing and a large courtyard behind it; quite an unusual feature for a large dwelling which, in this case, overlooking the canal to the north and therefore with rear sunshine, improves its functionality by recovering an architectural scheme already outdated in its time. The side on the Rio della Misericordia (or San Girolamo) shows, above the ground floor, a rather large mezzanine and, on the noble floor, an exaphor that was tampered with in a later period for the addition of the balconies. On the east side of the building the Aseo bridge joins the Fodamenta della Misericordia.
