= Palazzo Morosini Gatterburg =

Coordinates: 45.43269°N 12.33044°E

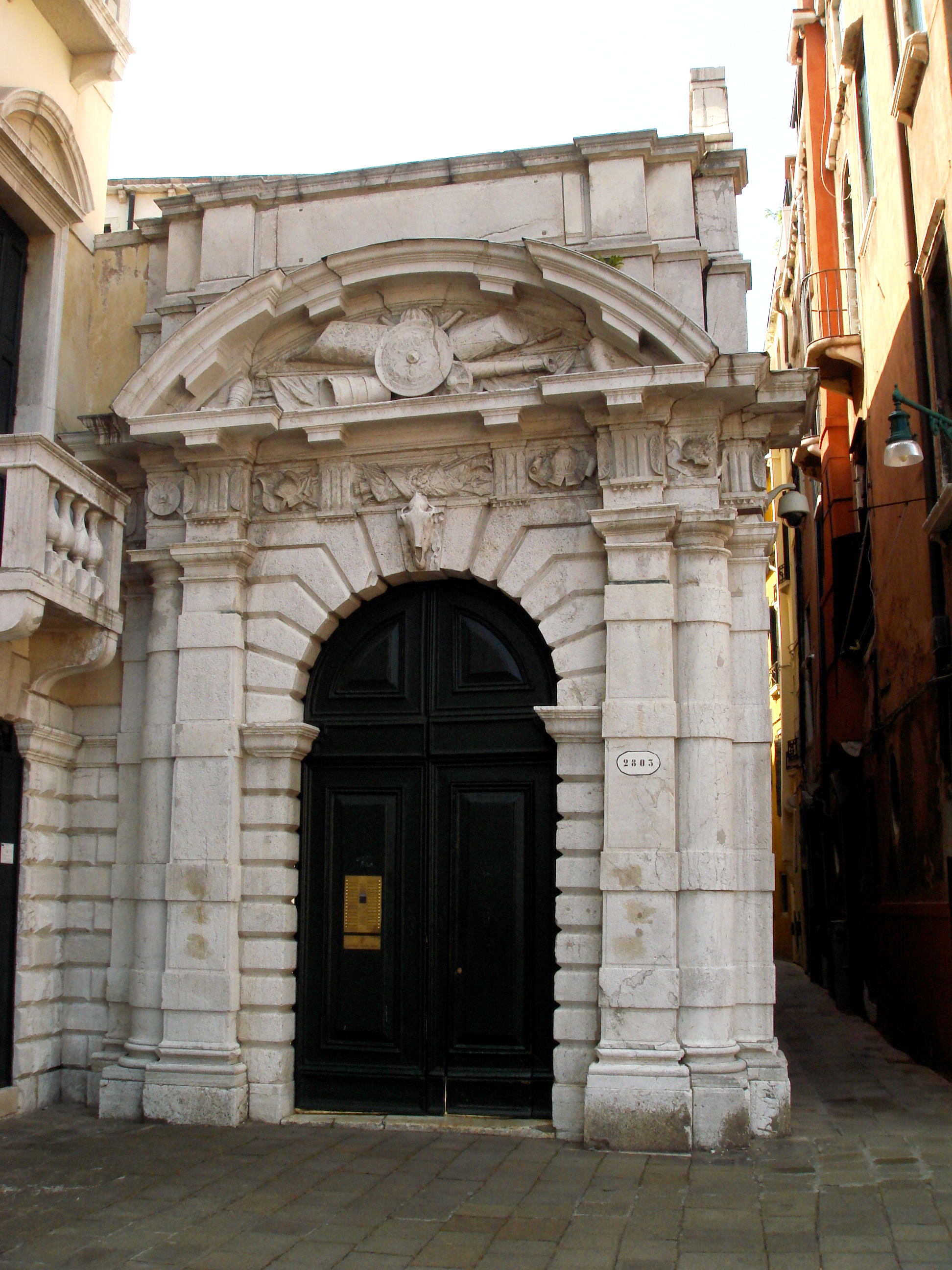
Portal to Palazzo Morosini a Santo Stefano

The Palazzo Morosini Gatterburg, also referred to as the Palazzo Morosini at Santo Stefano, is a 17th-century palace facing the Campo Santo Stefano in the sestiere of San Marco, Venice, Italy.

The palace, bought by the Morosini family in 1628, was originally refurbished by Francesco Morosini, known as Peloponnesiaco for his victories against the Ottomans in Morea (as the Peloponnese peninsula in Greece was referred to at the time), and doge from 1688 to 1694. The Palace was still held in the 19th century by a descendant, Lauredana Morosini Gatterburg, but in 1884, many of the possessions were sold, and others came into the possession of the Museo Correr. The paneling and furniture of one of the rooms is now on display in the Gardner Museum of Boston.

The palace still contains some of the original stucco decoration and frescoes of a mythologic theme in what was once a hall displaying some of the loot from Morea. Also there are frescoes completed for the 1688 wedding of Francesco Morosini and Paulina Mocenigo. The palace is now owned by Assicurazioni Generali, a bank, and serves for display of their collections.

Bull-fights took place in the campo in front of the palace as late as 1802 At one time, the palace also had portraits of eight Doges of the Morosini family, as well as of Tomasina Morosini, queen of Hungary, and Costanza Morosini, queen of Croatia.
