= Palazzo di Spagna a San Geremia =

Palace in Venice, Italy

Coordinates: 45.44296°N 12.32536°E

Palazzo di Spagna a San Geremia, also known as Palazzo Frigerio, is a palace located on the street Lista di Spagna street #168, once a canal (Rio dei Sabbioni) but undergoing landfill in 1844, about midway down the street between the train station and the piazza of the church of San Geremia in the sestiere of Cannaregio, in Venice, Italy. In past centuries, this area of Venice became known for housing foreign embassies, which the secret-obsessed Republic of Venice wished to keep distant from its government buildings.

The palace was sequentially owned by the Frigerio or Frizerio family. Andrea Frigerio was Cancellier Grande in 1575. The family were rich merchants who owned a thread store in the Drapperia of the Rialto district with a sign of Albero d'Oro. By October 1613, Giovanni Battista Antonio Friziero sells the palace to Francesco Maria Renier Zeno family, a Procurator of St Mark in 1647. The Zeno family gave the palace its late baroque facade. His heirs rented the building to the Spanish Government. In the 19th century the palace passed on to Count Giuseppe Monteallegre. Now the building is part of a Hotel. The gardens at the rear are part of one of the few green parks in Venice.
