= Palazzo Soranzo Piovene =

Renaissance-style palace in Venice, Italy

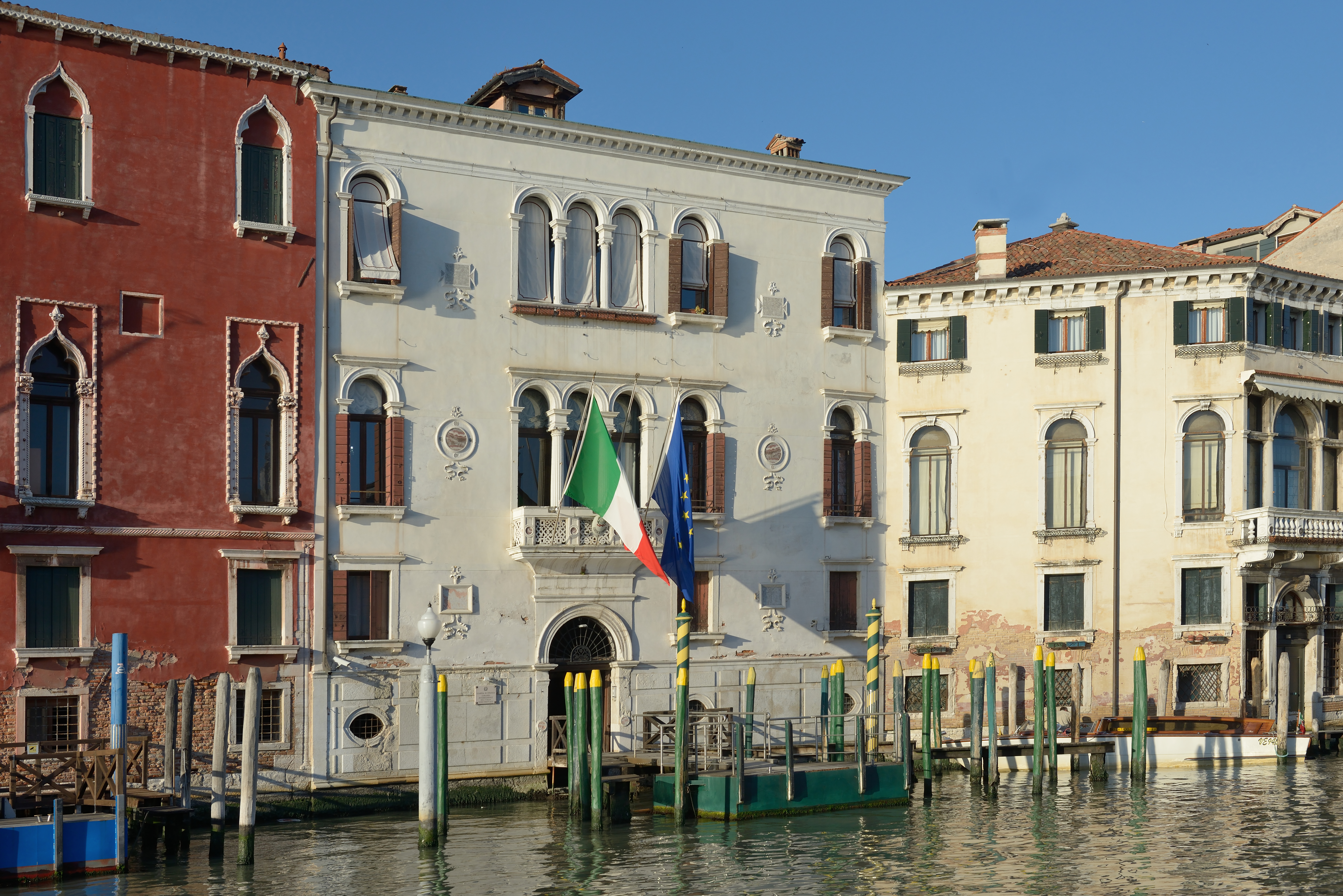
Palazzo Soranzo Piovene.

Palazzo Soranzo Piovene, also called Soranzo Piovene alla Maddalena is a Renaissance-style palace on the Grand Canal, located between the Palazzo Emo at Maddalena and the Palazzo Erizzo, in the sestiere of Cannaregio, in Venice, Italy.

== History ==
The palace was built by the Soranzo family in the 16th century attributed to Sante Lombardo, son of Tullio Lombardo. The courtyard has a prototypic mosaic pavement of the era. With the death of Francesco Soranzo in 1724, the palace was inherited by his sister Cecilia, daughter of Pietro Soranzo, and wife of Coriolan Piovene.

The Piovene family from Vicenza had been inducted into the patriciate in 1645, after Guido Piovene was executed during the fall of Nicosia.

== See also ==
- Palazzo Soranzo Pisani
