= Palazzo Moro Lin (San Marco) =

Coordinates: 45°26′0.098″N 12°19′39.5″E

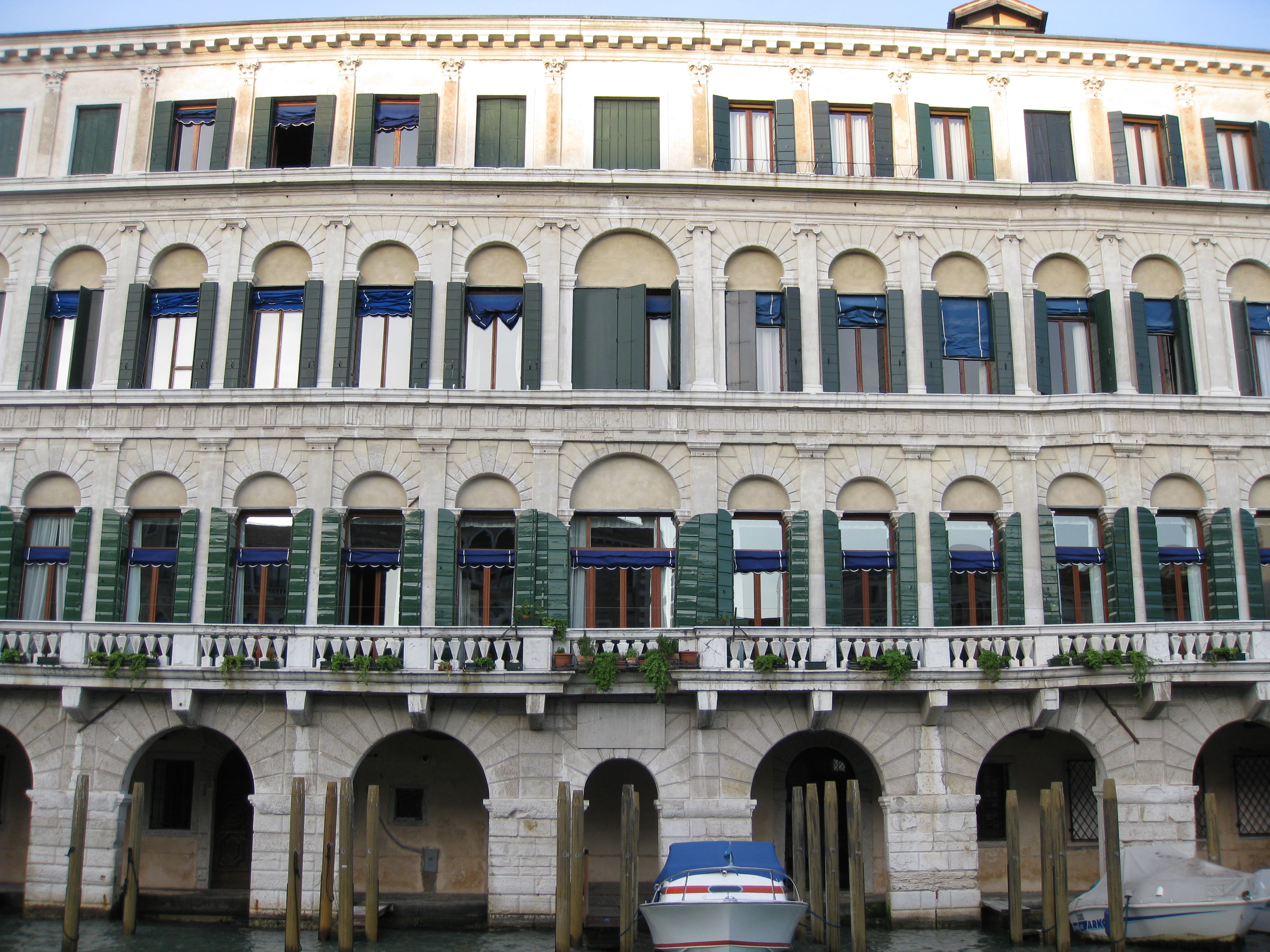
Palazzo Moro Lin

The Palazzo Moro Lin, also called the palace of 13 windows is a baroque-style palace on the Grand Canal, located between the Palazzo Grassi and the Palazzo da Lezze, in the sestiere of San Marco, in Venice, Italy.

The palace was built in 1670 by design of Sebastiano Mazzoni, and made for the painter Pietro Liberi. The palace interior has frescoes by Antonio Bellucci, Antonio Molinari, and Gregorio Lazzarini. The palace was soon bought by the Lin family. At the death of Michele Anzolo Lin in 1788, the palace was inherited by his niece Elisabetta, the wife of Gasparo Moro of San Trovaso, who afterwards called themselves Moro-Lin. In 1942 it was purchased by the Milanese industrialist Enrico Ghezzi.

== See also ==
- Palazzo Moro Lin (San Polo)
