= Palazzo Priuli Stazio, Venice =

Coordinates: 45.44132°N 12.32857°E

The Palazzo Priuli Stazio is a Baroque architecture palace located near San Giacomo dell'Orio in the sestiere of Santa Croce in Venice, Italy.

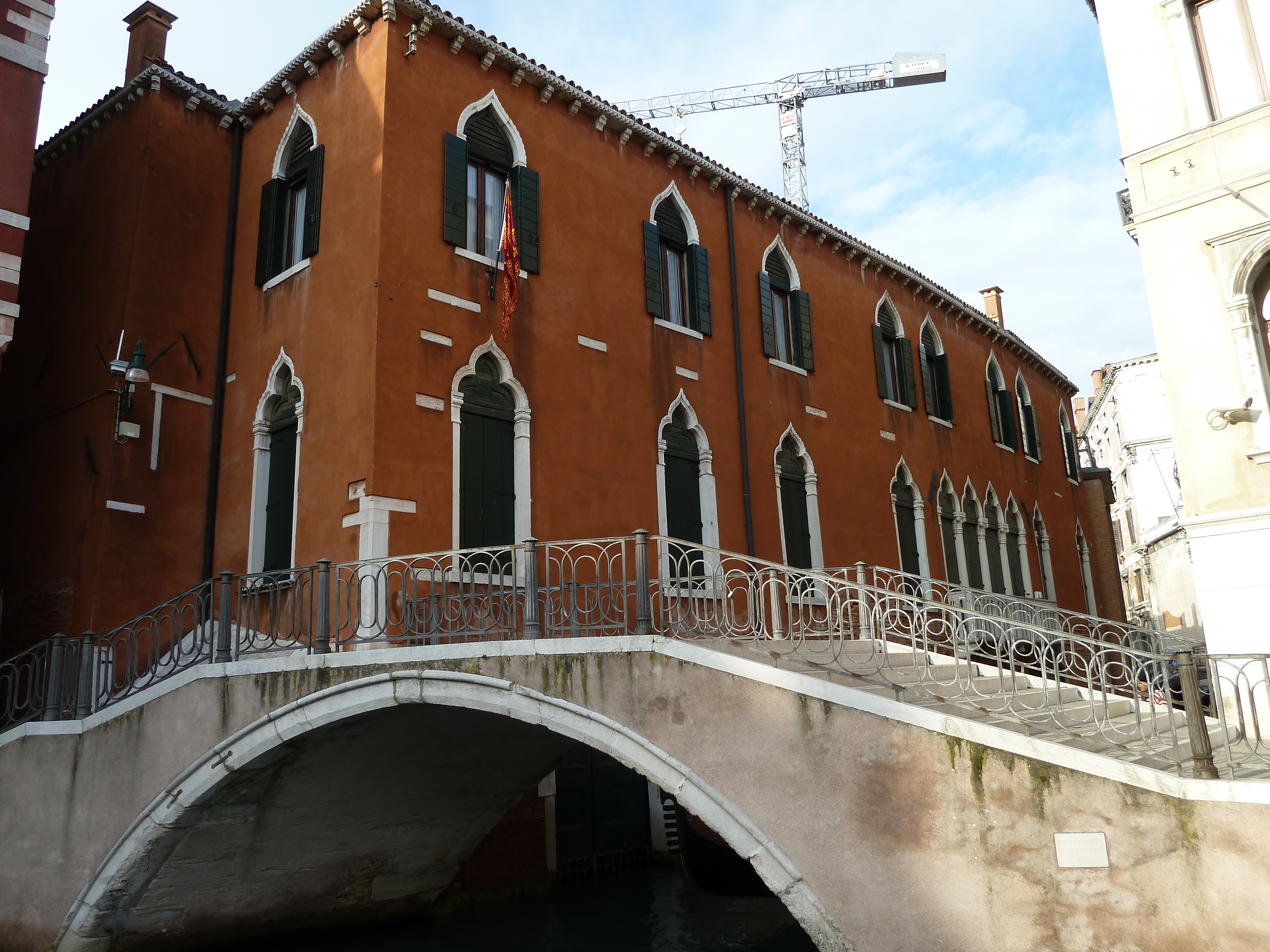
Palace Facade

== History ==
Previously, the place had been property of the Suriàn family, admitted to Venetian aristocracy in 1648. The family originally had moved from Rimini in the 15th century, and included the physician Giacomo; Grand Chancellor Andrea; Bernardo, archbishop of Corfu in 1482; and an Antonio, patriarch of Venice in 1504. The aristocratic branch was soon extinguished by 1679.

In 1534, the Suriàn family sold this palace to Marcantonio Prezzato, a rich merchant from Bergamo, who moved to Venice around 1537. Agostino, the son of Marcantonio commissioned reconstruction using designs of Jacopo Sansovino. In 1636, a son of Agostino, also named Marcantonio, in turn sold the palace to Lorenzo and Bernardo Stazio; in 1659, the Stazio family joined the aristocracy. In 1701, by virtue of Elisabetta Stazio's marriage to Michiele Priuli-Renier, the palace was ultimately inherited in the 19th century, by two sisters: Elisabetta Labia Priuli and Orsola Priuli Maccarani, both living in Rome. In 1859, the palace was deeded to the Comune of Venice to serve as quarters of the Municipal Guards.

The interior decoration has since been dispersed. In the 18th century, the ground floor had, in the style of Alessandro Vittoria, a bust of a bearded man; likely a portrait of someone from the Priuli family. There were also once four oil canvases located in the piano nobile depicting illustrious members of the Priuli Family:

- Silvestro Priuli, son of Michele, and grandnephew of King Taksony of Hungary, who during the crusades was one of the first to scale the walls of Ascalon in 1098.
- Zilia, daughter of Marco Dandolo, and wife of Doge Lorenzo Priuli, crowned dogaressa 1557.
- Pietro Priuli, son of Benedetto, elevated among other commissions to Provveditore to the Crown. 1593.
- Francesco Priuli, son of Michele, once ambassador to Charles Emmanuel I, Duke of Savoy, and then in Valladolid to King Philip III of Spain, defending the Republic of Venice from the calumnies by its enemies in 1606.

It now serves as a middle school scuola media for the Istituto Comprensivo Francesco Morosini.
