= Palazzo Mocenigo =

Palazzo Mocenigo may be one of the following palazzos in Venice, Italy, named after the Mocenigo family, seven of whom were Doges of Venice:

- Palazzo Mocenigo di San Stae, Sestiere of Santa Croce
- Palazzi Mocenigo, Sestiere of San Marco:
  - Palazzo Mocenigo Casa Nuova
  - Palazzo Mocenigo Casa Vecchia
  - Palazzo Mocenigo detto "il Nero"
- Palazzo Erizzo Nani Mocenigo, Sestiere of San Marco
- Palazzo Corner Mocenigo, Sestiere of San Polo
- Palazzo Mocenigo alla Giudecca, Giudecca
- Palazzo Mocenigo Gambara, Sestiere of Dorsoduro
- Palazzo Barbarigo Nani Mocenigo, Sestiere of Dorsoduro
- Palazzetto Nani Mocenigo, Sestiere of Dorsoduro
- Casa Foscari Mocenigo, Sestiere of Castello
