= Palazzo Erizzo Nani Mocenigo =

Building in Venice, Italy

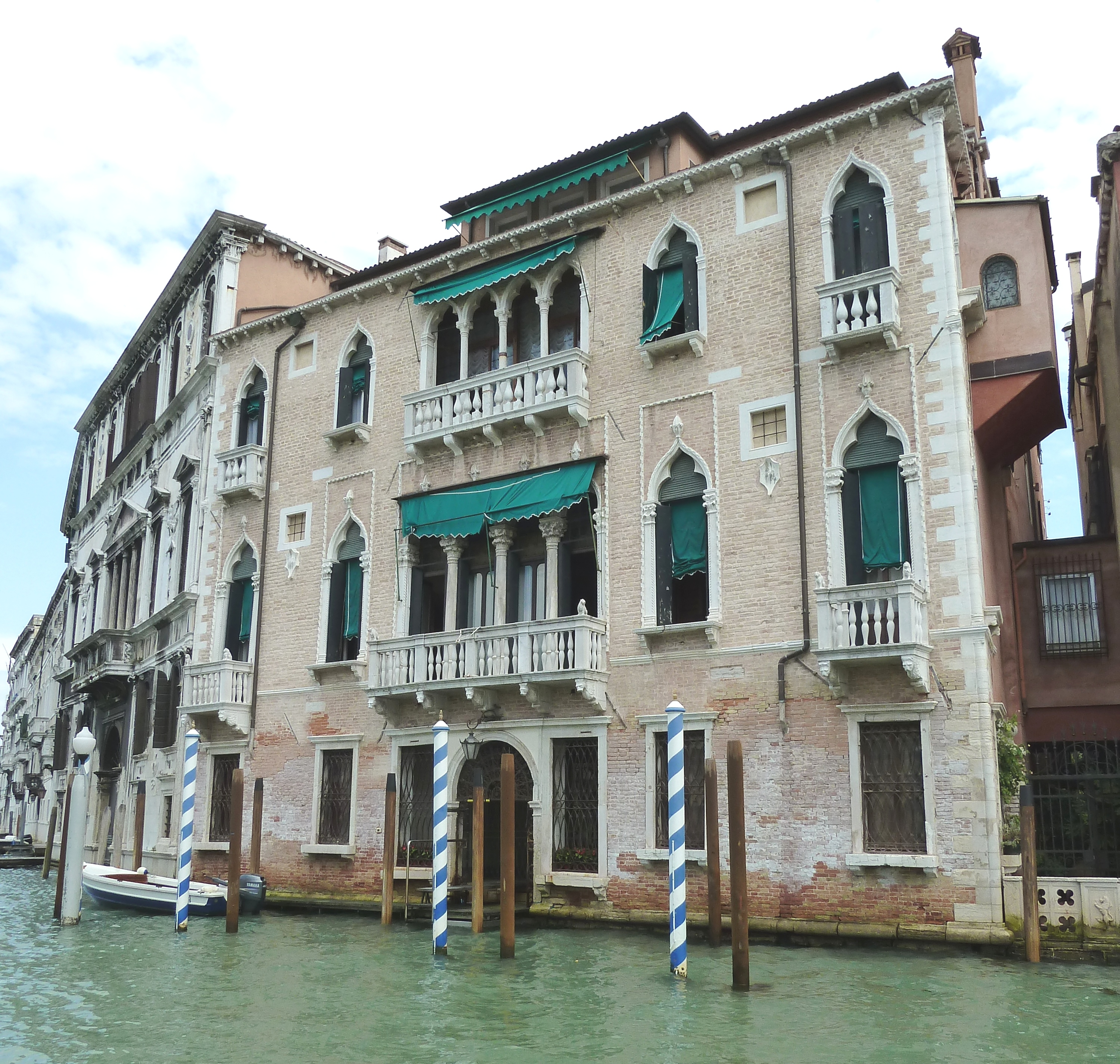
- Palazzo Erizzo Nani Mocenigo
- Interactive map of the Palazzo Erizzo Nani Mocenigo area

General information
- Type: Residential
- Architectural style: Gothic
- Location: San Marco district, Venice, Italy
- Coordinates: 45°26′04.42″N 12°19′40.19″E
- Construction started: 1470
- Construction stopped: 1480

Technical details
- Floor count: 3 levels

Palazzo Erizzo Nani Mocenigo is a palace in Venice located in the San Marco district and overlooking the Grand Canal between Palazzo Da Lezze and Palazzo Contarini delle Figure.

== History ==
It was built by the Erizzo family in 1480 in the Venetian Gothic style and then passed to the Nani family (later Nani-Mocenigo) in 1537. The Nani family, included in the Serrata del Maggior Consiglio of 1297, moved from Torcello to Venice in the 12th century and subsequently divided into three branches, the main of which died out at the end of the 18th century.

== Architecture ==
The building has a ground floor with a water portal and two noble floors decorated with quadriforas flanked by pairs of monoforas. The brick facade on the Grand Canal is divided vertically into three sections, each of which has late Gothic decorations: top flowers, trefoil window frames, serrated frames, and Corinthian capitals. The vertical edges of Istrian stone, the string course, and two coats of arms of the Da Lezze family are also present on the facade. The most interesting element of the composition is the quadrifora on the first noble floor, decorated by a projected balcony, columns, elaborate shelves, and zoomorphic figures. The arched water portal is designed in Renaissance forms and disagrees with the overall Gothic ensemble. The facade also offers a large and recent dormer window—a symptom of a rear extension that added terraces above the roof.

The rear facade overlooks a large garden and is decorated with zoomorphic paterae. It has two central triforas surrounded by single-light windows.

== Gallery ==
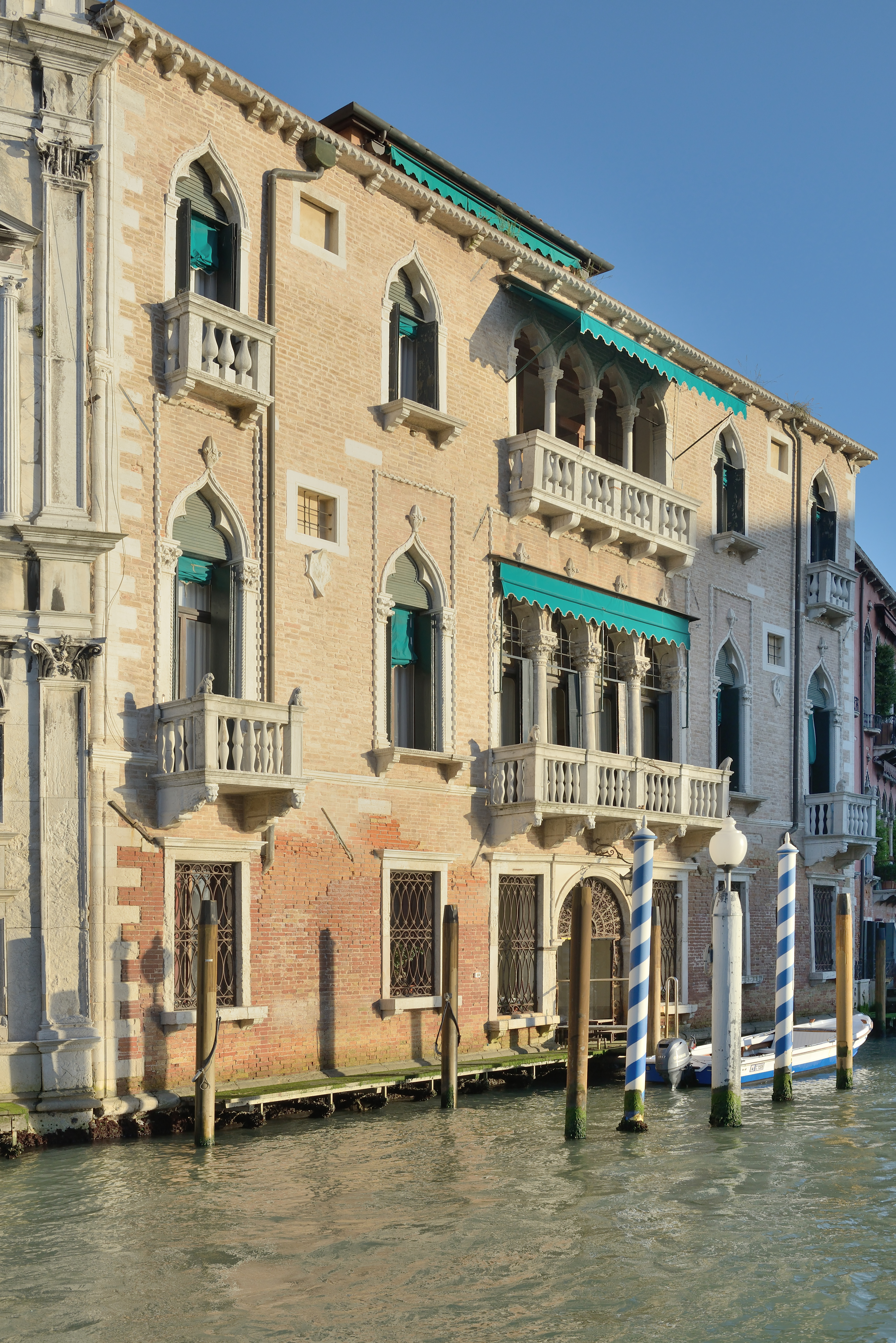
Facade details

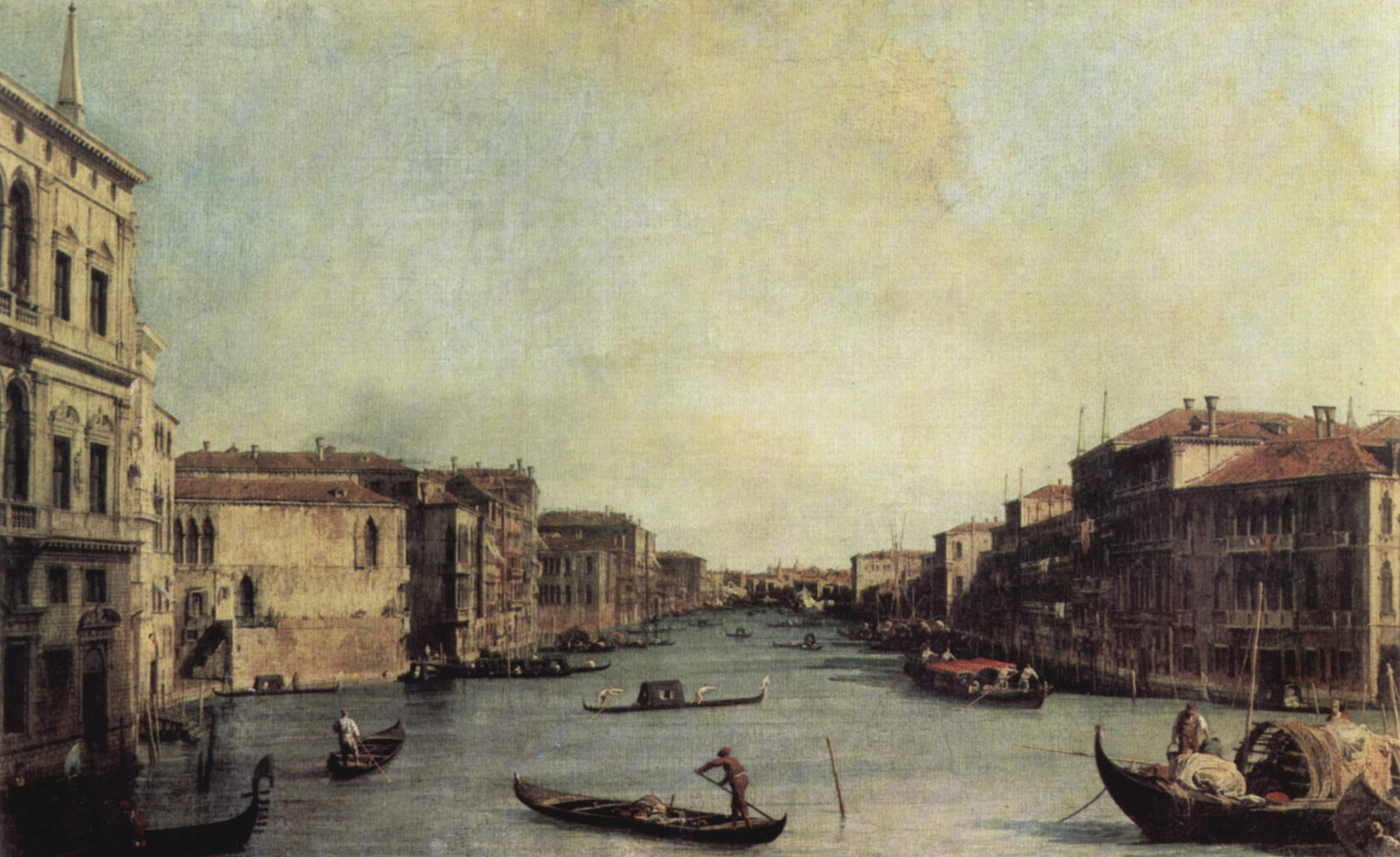
Il Canal Grande by Canaletto (1728). The palazzo is on the right side.

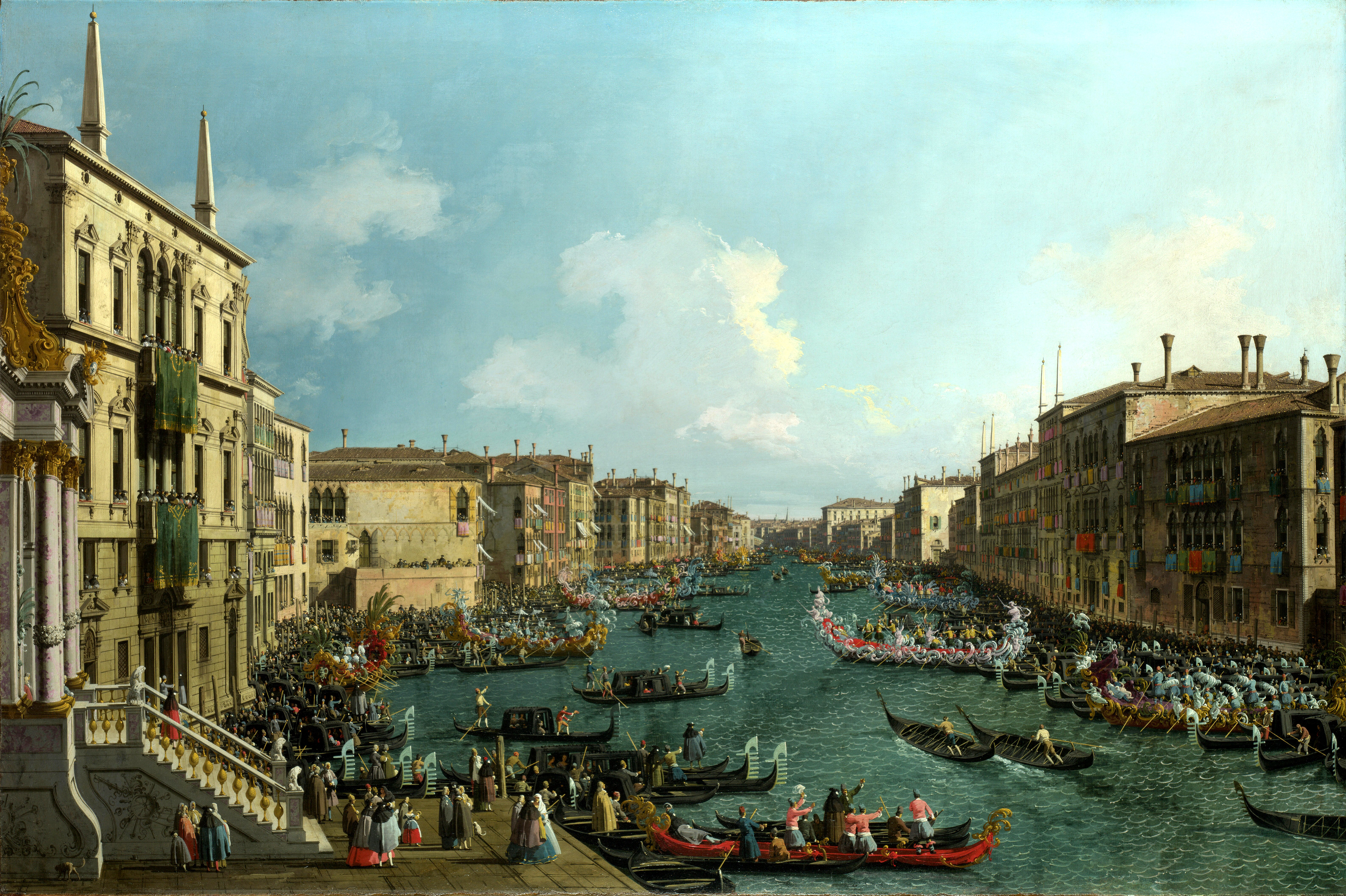
A Regatta on the Grand Canal by Canaletto (1740)

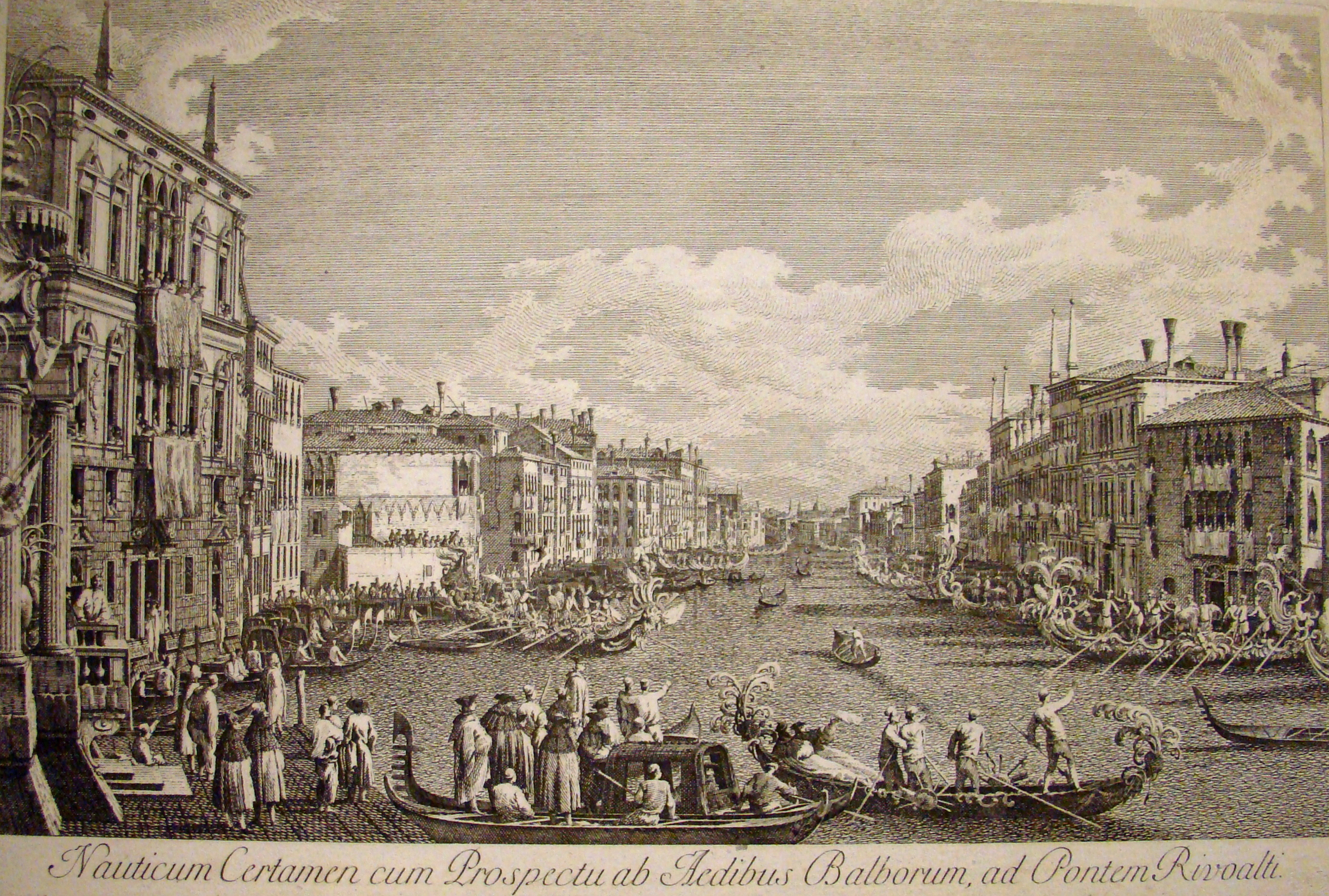
Engraving by Canaletto

== See also ==
- Palazzo Nani
- Palazzo Barbarigo Nani Mocenigo
