= Palazzo Contarini delle Figure =

Building in Venice, Italy

Coordinates: 45°26′4″N 12°19′40″E

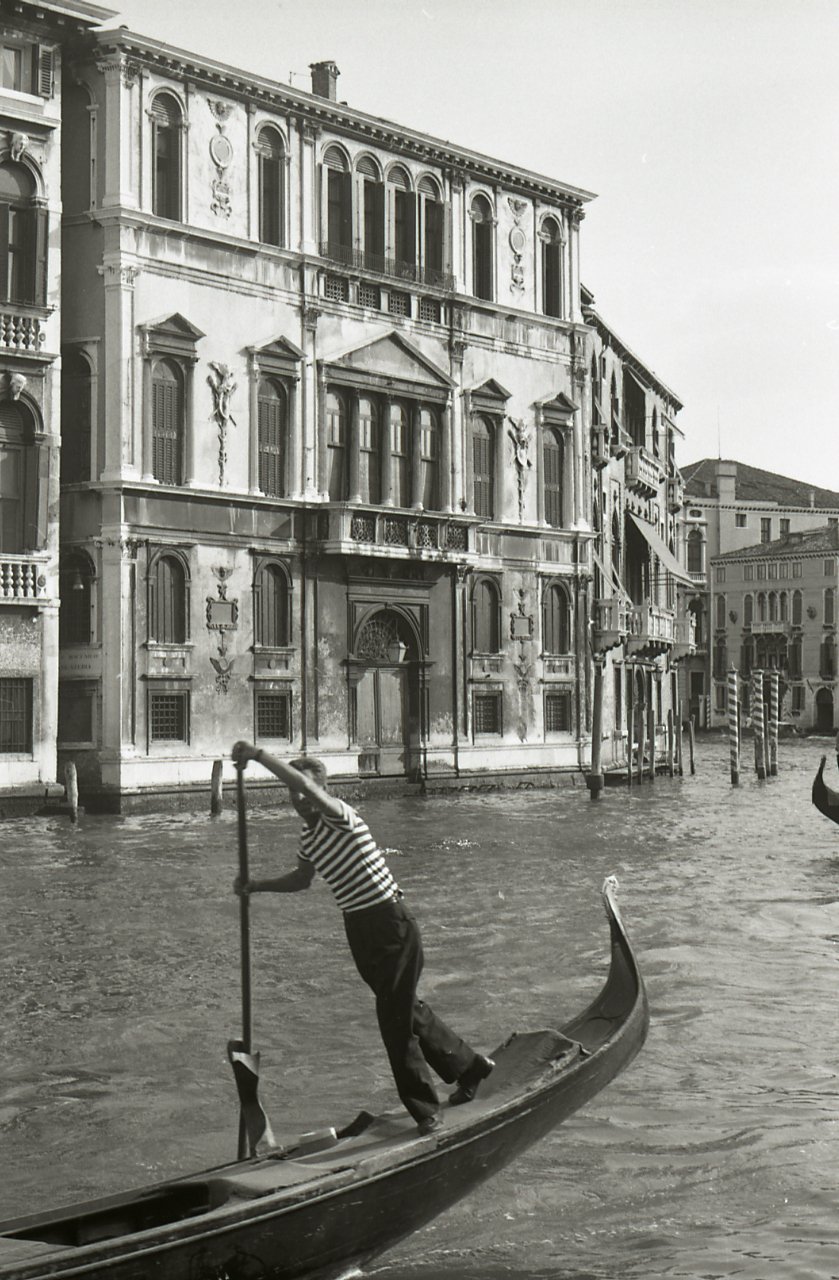
Palazzo Contarini delle Figure seen from the Canal Grande. Photo by Paolo Monti, 1969

The Palazzo Contarini delle Figure is a Renaissance-style palace located between the Palazzo Mocenigo Ca' Vecchia and Palazzo Erizzo Nani Mocenigo, across the Grand Canal from the Palazzo Civran Grimani in the sestiere di San Marco in the city of Venice, Italy.

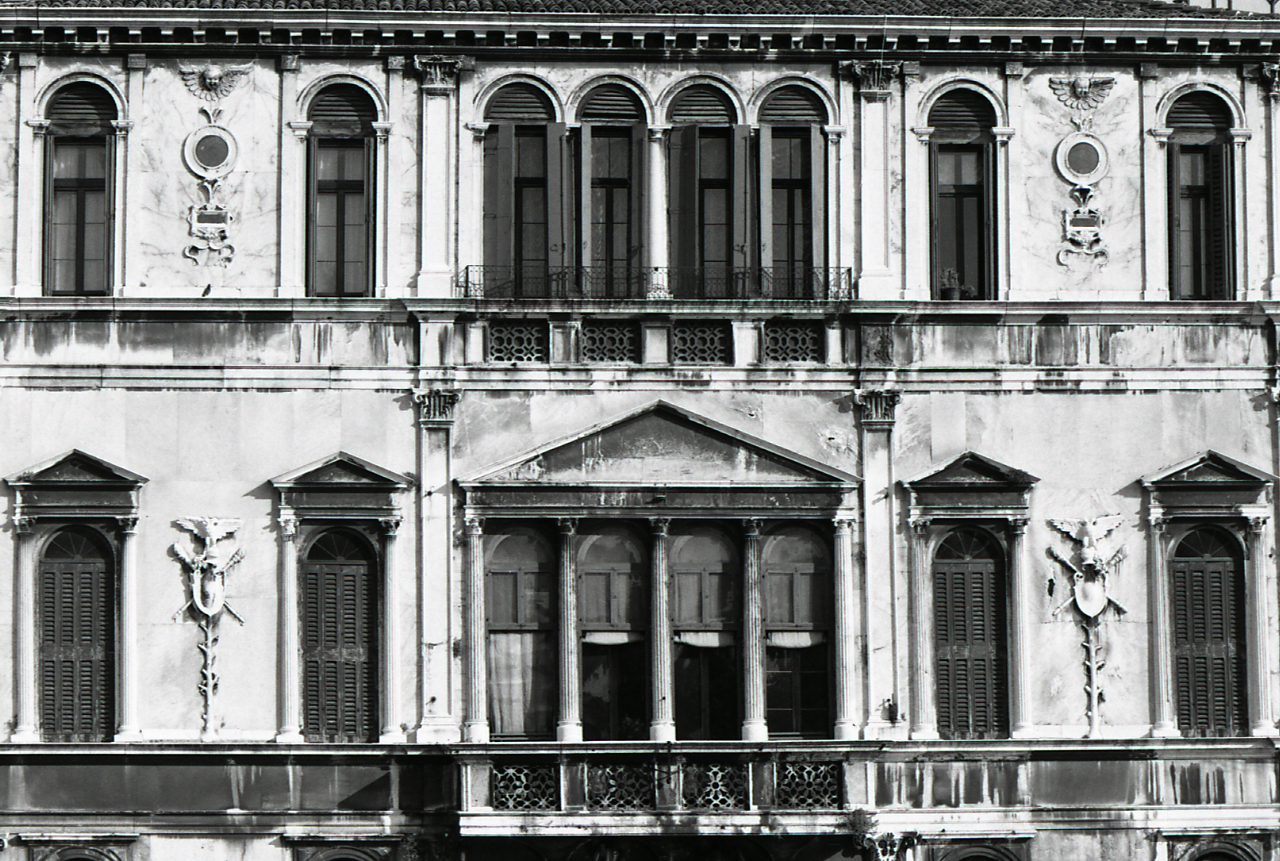
Detail of the facade. Photo by Paolo Monti, 1977

== Attribution ==
The marble facade is attributed to either Antonio Abbondi (Scarpagnino), Mauro Codussi, Antonio Lombardo, son of Pietro Lombardo, or Giorgio Spavento

== History ==
It was commissioned by Jacopo Contarini, procurator of San Marco, to replace an earlier palace in the Gothic style. Construction took place from 1504 to 1546. In 1713, Bertucci Contarini, the last male heir donated the palaces art collection to the Ducal Palace. In the 19th century it was bought by marchese Alessandro Guiccioli, whose wife Teresa is recalled for her affair with Lord Byron. The palace, in somewhat poor state of conservation, has been subdivided into private apartments.

The name Contarini delle Figure supposedly refers to caryatids above the ground floor portals below the main balcony.

== Architecture ==
The palazzo was designed according to a style that makes many references to the works of Andrea Palladio. The façade is divided vertically and horizontally by nine parts (three by three) and combines many decorative details highlighted by various colors. The ground floor has a large water portal, flanked by eight single-light windows on two levels. The central part of the façade contains a triangular pediment supported by five fluted Corinthian columns framing four windows—a quite peculiar detail since columns in a portico are usually even in number. It is assumed that once the capitals were covered with gold. The top level is decorated with a quadrifora.
