= Contin (surname) =

Contin is a surname which may refer to:

- Alexis Contin (born 1986), French speed skater
- Carlos Raúl Contín (1915–1991), Argentine politician
- Celeste Contín (born 1978), Argentine former tennis player
- Corrado Contin (1922–2001), Italian footballer
- Francesco Contin (1585–1654), Swiss-Italian sculptor and architect
- Leandro Contín (born 1995), Argentine footballer
