= Palazzo Nani =

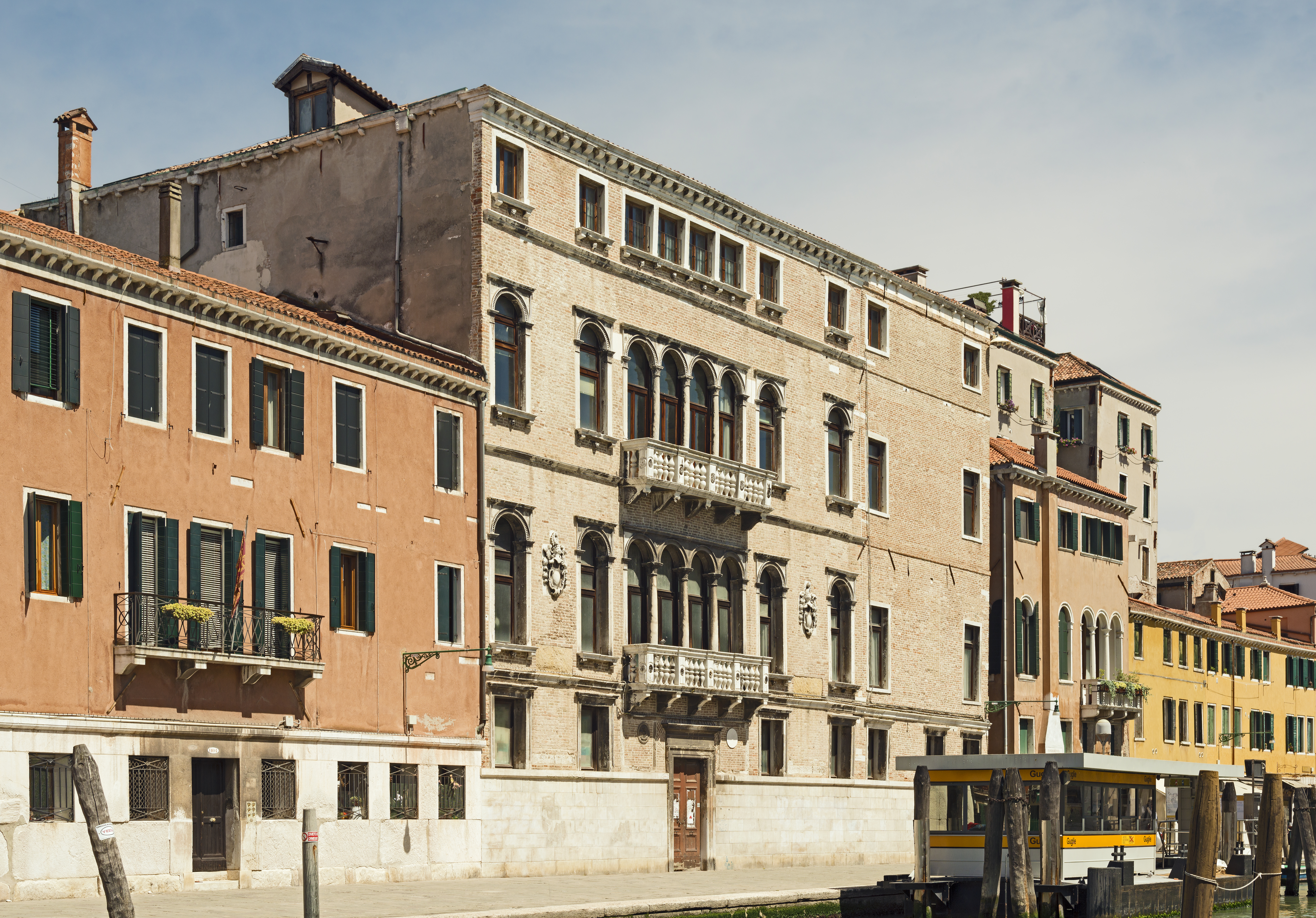
- Palazzo Nani
- Interactive map of the Palazzo Nani area

General information
- Type: Office
- Architectural style: Renaissance
- Location: Cannaregio district, Venice, Italy
- Coordinates: 45°26′40″N 12°19′28.4″E
- Construction started: 16th century

Technical details
- Floor count: 3

Palazzo Nani is a Renaissance palace in the Cannaregio district of Venice, Italy.

== History ==
The palazzo was built in the 16th century to be a residence of the Nani family of the "Cannaregio" branch (later Nani Mocenigo). In the 1680s, the palazzo was remodeled according to a design plan by Alessandro Vittoria, who also performed the interior decoration.

In its golden years, the palace kept a substantial art collection, consisting of finds from the Roman era. The entrance portal was decorated with two large statues of consuls.

The Nani owned the palazzo until 1810, when they moved to San Trovaso to live in Palazzo Barbarigo Nani Mocenigo. In 1859, the palazzo was occupied by the Austrian army that converted it into barracks, then it was used as a school. The pieces of the art collection were gradually dispersed.

In 2021, following a 22-month renovation led by architect Marco Piva and approved by the Fine Arts Heritage Committee, Palazzo Nani became a five-star Radisson Collection hotel with 52 guest rooms. The restoration preserved some original decorative and architectural elements of the building’s façade and interiors, including historical ornaments, stuccos and paintings on the walls and ceilings.

== Architecture ==
Palazzo Nani's front consists of four levels, including a ground floor and a mezzanine. The façade, today rather unadorned, is asymmetrical due to the massive 19th-century additions that extend the whole building to the right. The window layout is pretty regular and includes quadriforas; those of the noble floors have balconies. On each side of the quadrifora on the first floor there is a stone coats of arms.

The interior decoration is also attributed to Vittoria, with stuccoes and frescoes still well-preserved in the portego of the first floor.

The palace was once accompanied by a garden; that area is today built up.

== See also ==
- Palazzo Erizzo Nani Mocenigo, San Marco
- Palazzo Barbarigo Nani Mocenigo, Dorsoduro
