= Francesco Contin =

Swiss-Italian sculptor and architect

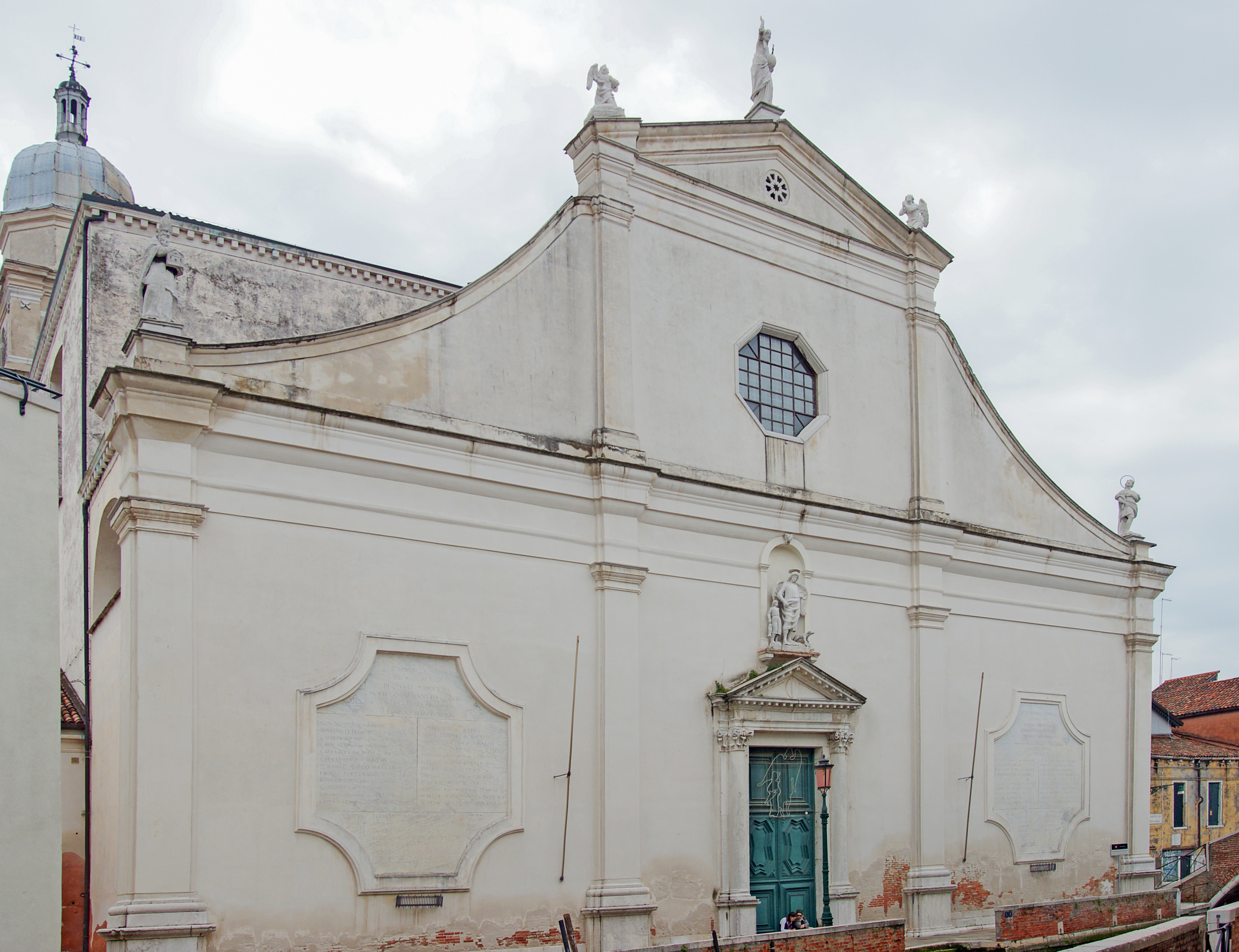
The facade of the Church of San Raffaele Arcangelo in Venice, designed by Francesco Contin.

Francesco Contin (1585 in Lugano, Switzerland – 1654 in Venice, Italy) was a Swiss-Italian sculptor and architect.

Contin designed the Palazzo Mocenigo Casa Vecchia on the Grand Canal in Venice, built between 1623 and 1625. He designed the interior of the Church of San Lazzaro dei Mendicanti in Venice (1634–37).

== Sources ==
- Italian Wikipedia: it:Francesco Contin.
