= Palazzo Mocenigo Casa Nuova, Venice =

Coordinates: 45.4346°N 12.3294°E

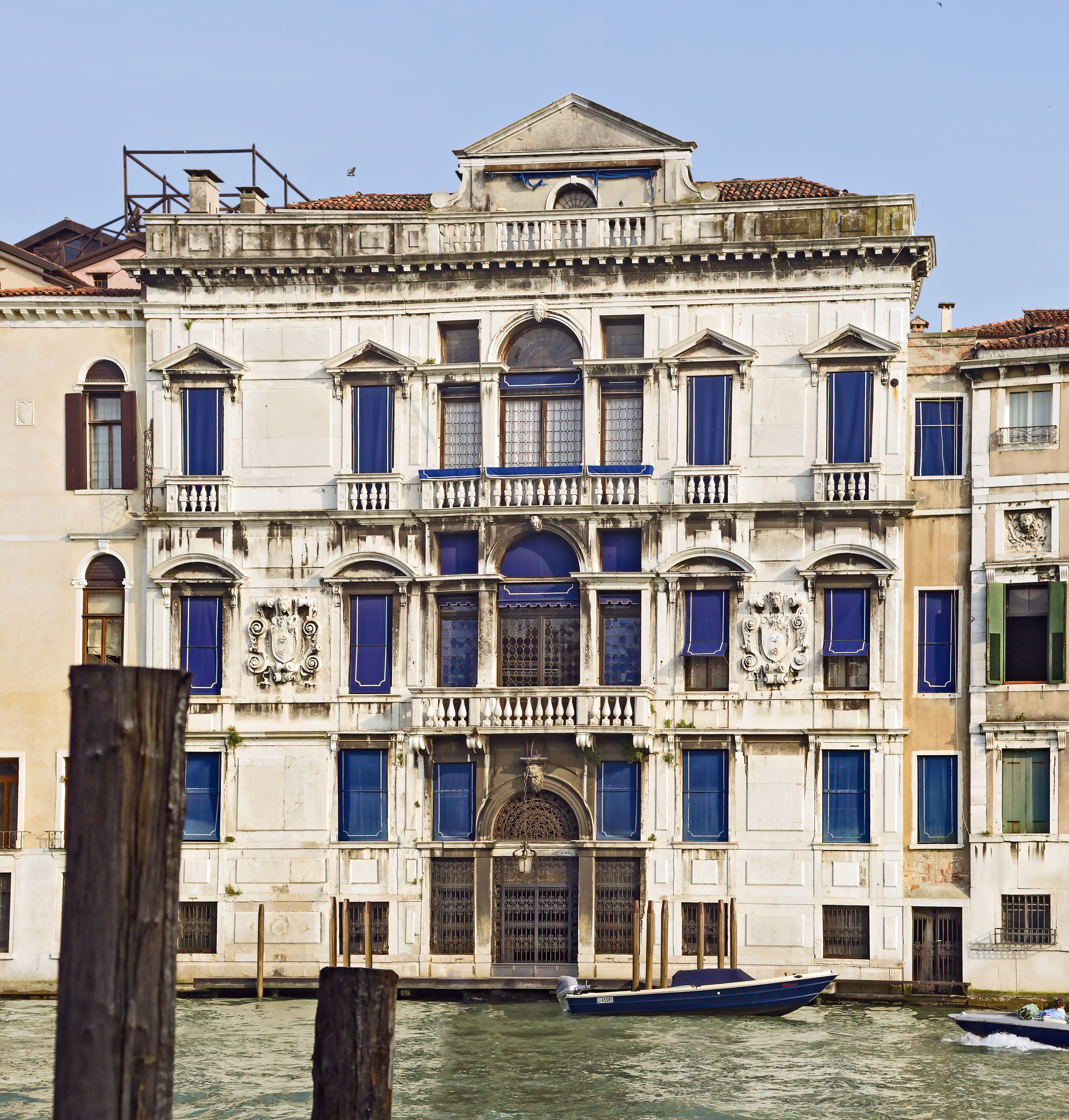
View of the Palazzo Mocenigo Case Nova on the Grand Canal in Venice.

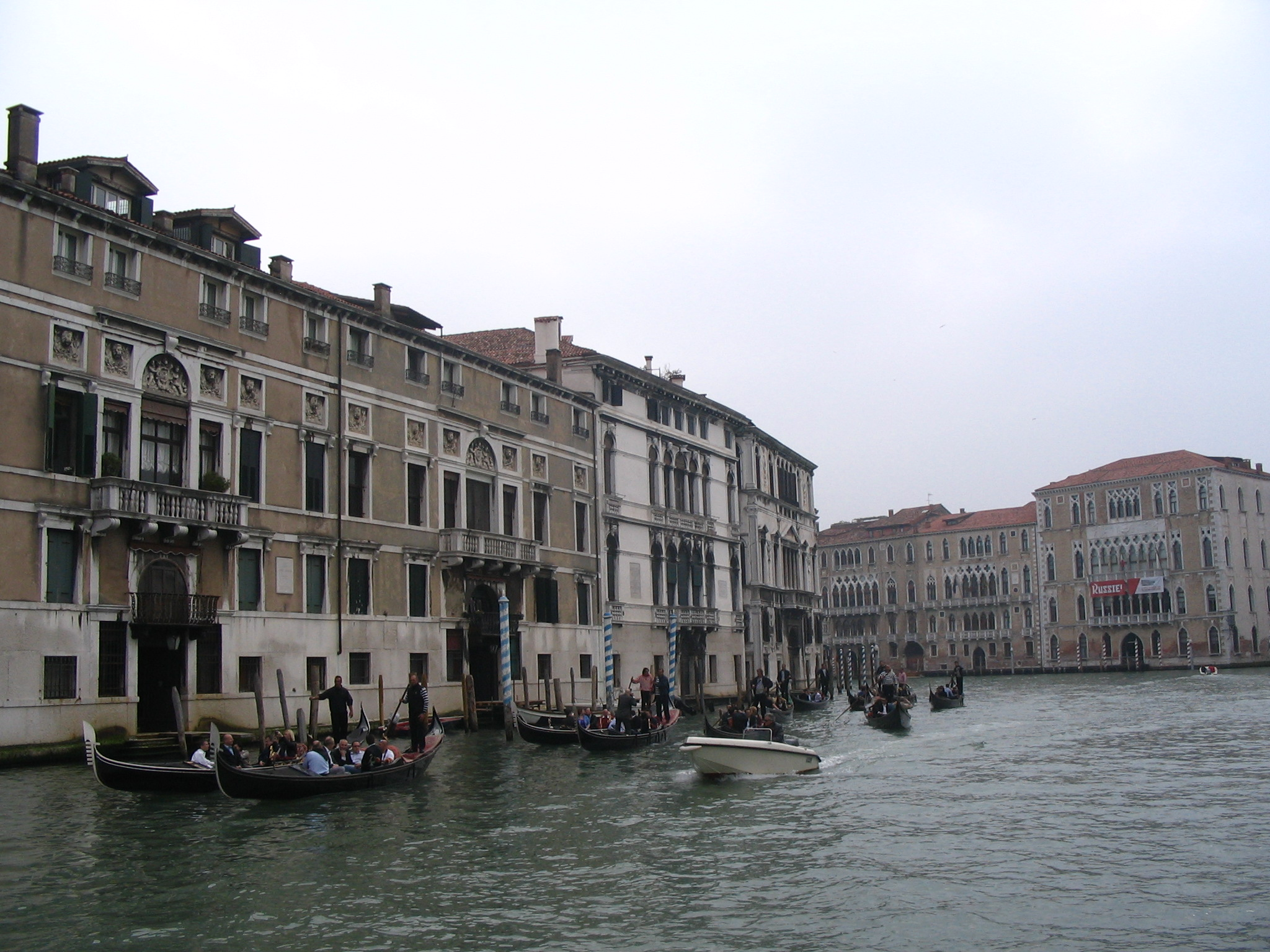
View of the Palazzo Mocenigo Case Nova and Palazzo Mocenigo detto "il Nero" on the Grand Canal in Venice.

The Palazzo Mocenigo Casa Nuova is a palazzo on the Grand Canal in the sestiere of San Marco, Venice, Italy. The palazzo is located between the Rialto Bridge and St Mark's Square. The original Palazzo Mocenigo consisted four different buildings built for the Mocenigo family, seven of whom were Doges of Venice. Other Palazzi Mocenigo include the Palazzo Mocenigo Casa Vecchia and the Palazzo Mocenigo, forming a building complex designed for entertainment.

== See also ==
- Palazzi Mocenigo
- Palazzo Mocenigo Casa Vecchia
