= Monofora =

Type of window

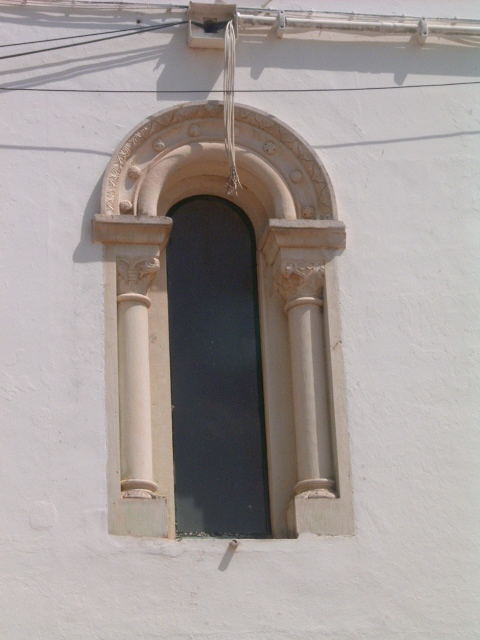
Casa dos Patudos

Monofora is a type of the single-light window, usually narrow, crowned by an arch, and decorated by small columns or pilasters.

== Overview ==
The term usually refers to a certain type of window designed during the Romanesque, Gothic, and Renaissance periods, and also during the nineteenth-century Eclecticism in architecture. In other cases, the term may mean an arched window with a single opening.

== Gallery ==
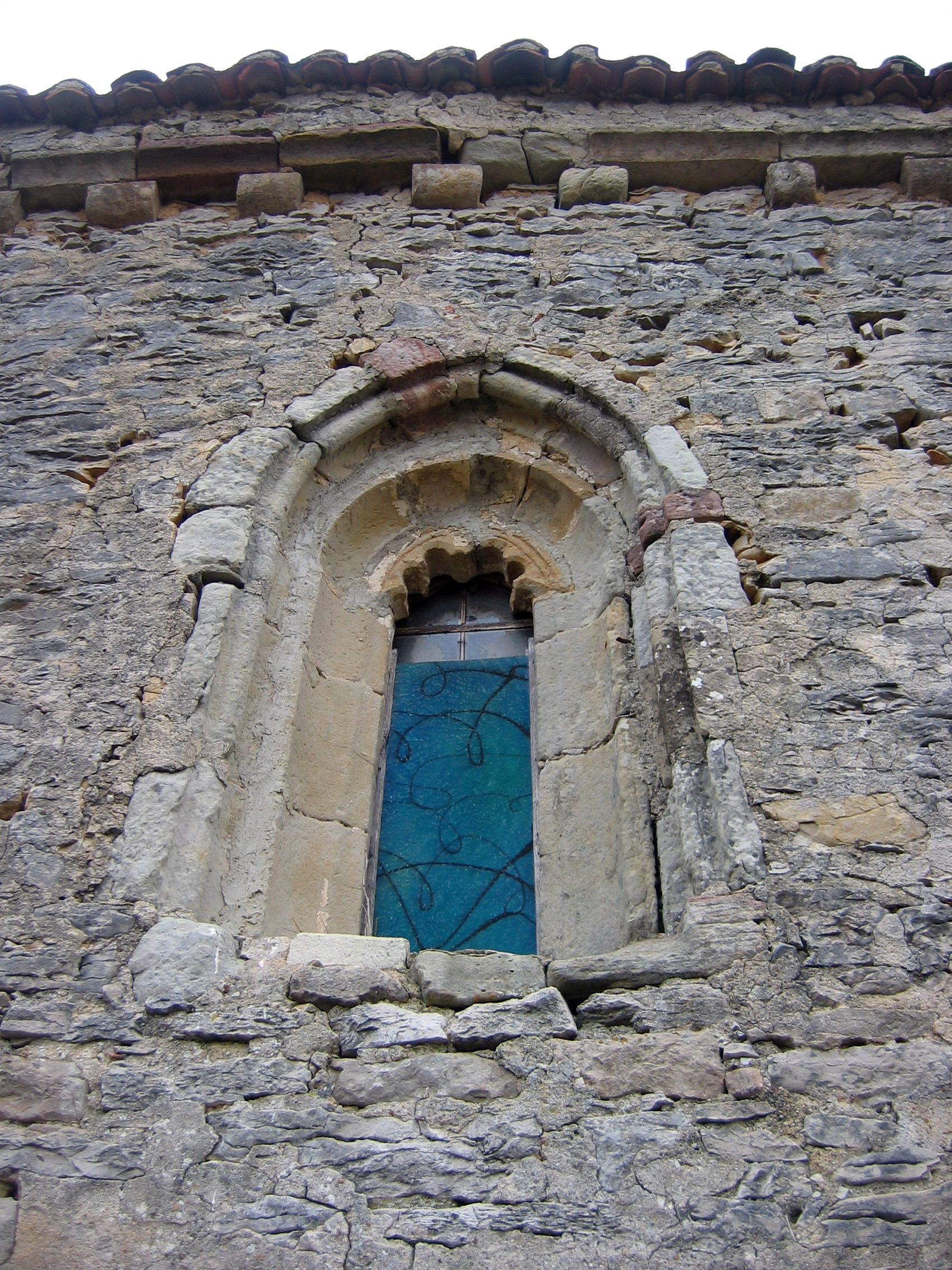
Windows detail in the shrine of Saint Lucia in La Rebolleda (Burgos, Spain).

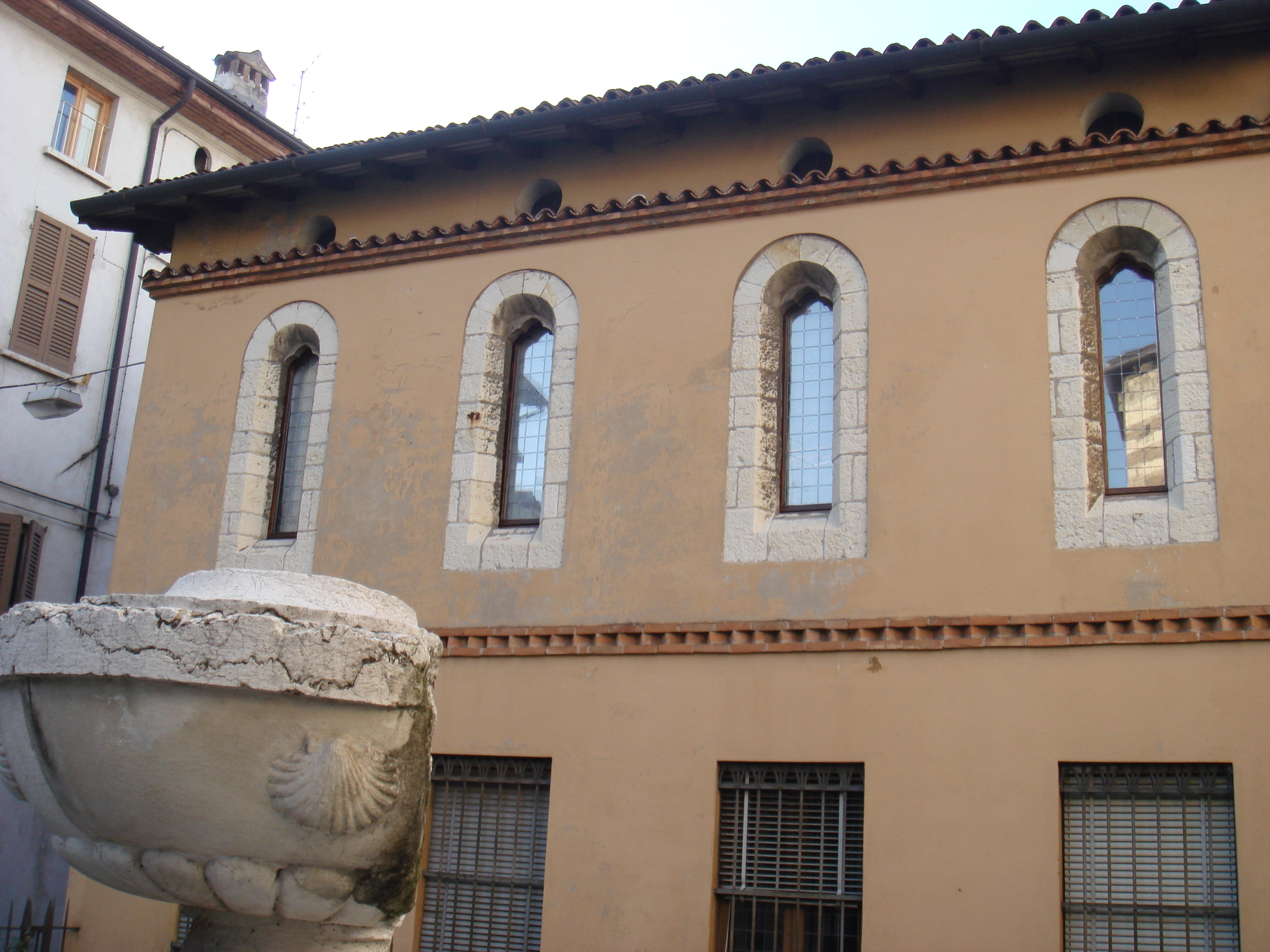
Chiesa di San Francesco d'Assisi a Brescia.

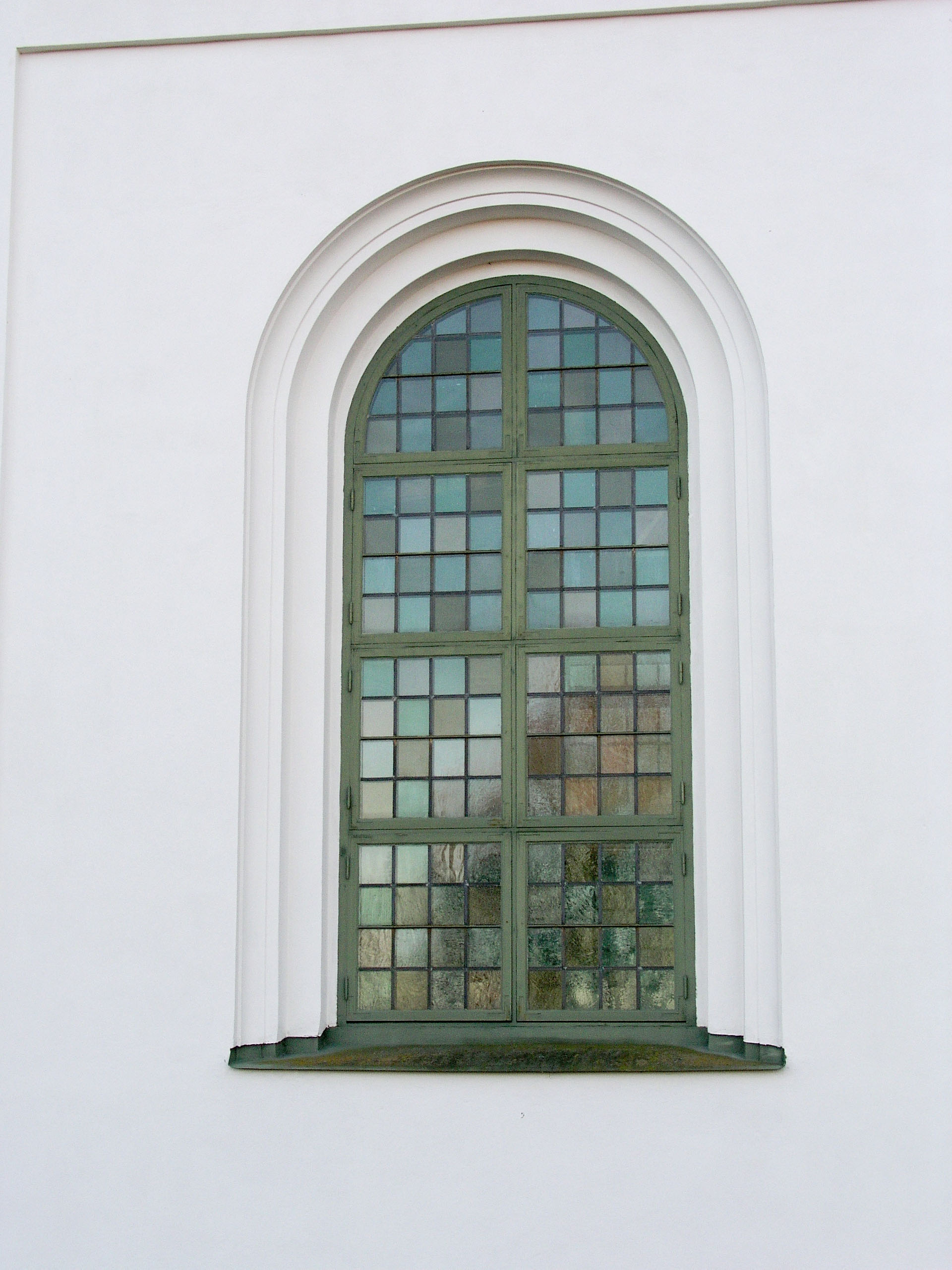
Sjögestads kyrka

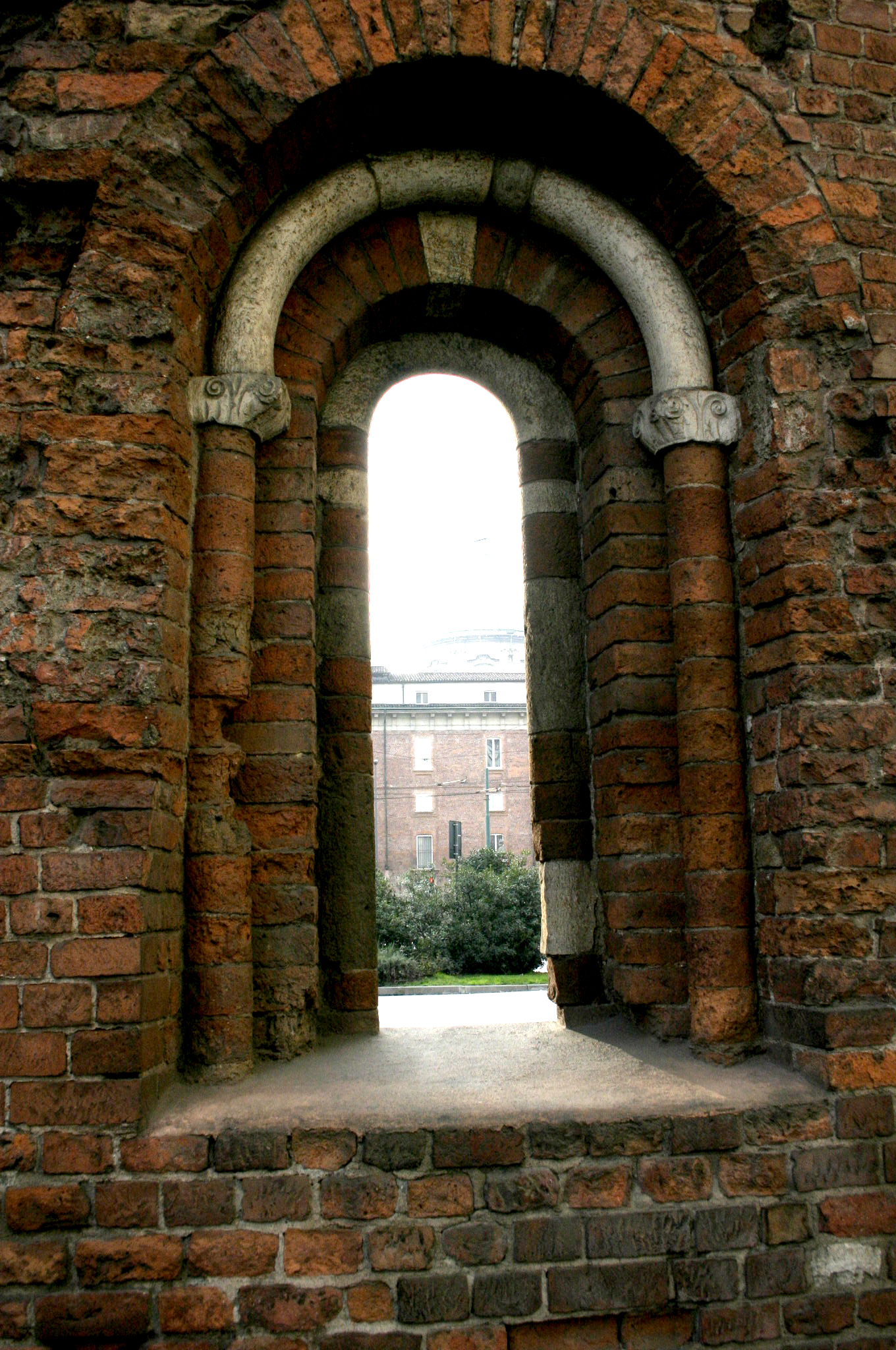
Monofora window in Piazza Missori in Milan

== See also ==
- Lancet window
- Bifora
- Trifora
- Quadrifora
- Polifora
