= Palazzi Mocenigo =

Coordinates: 45°26′06″N 12°19′42″E

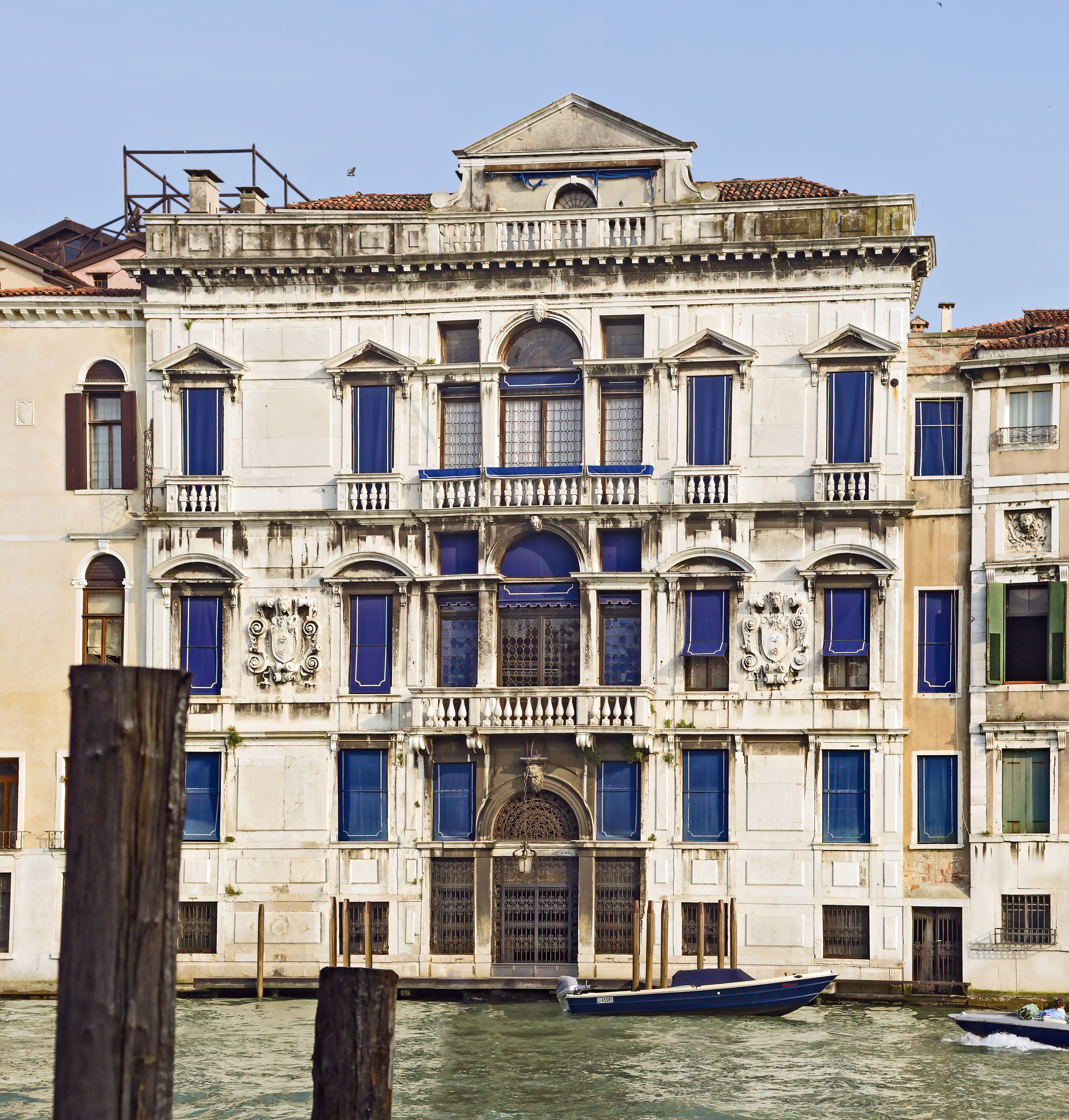
Palazzo Mocenigo Casa Nuova

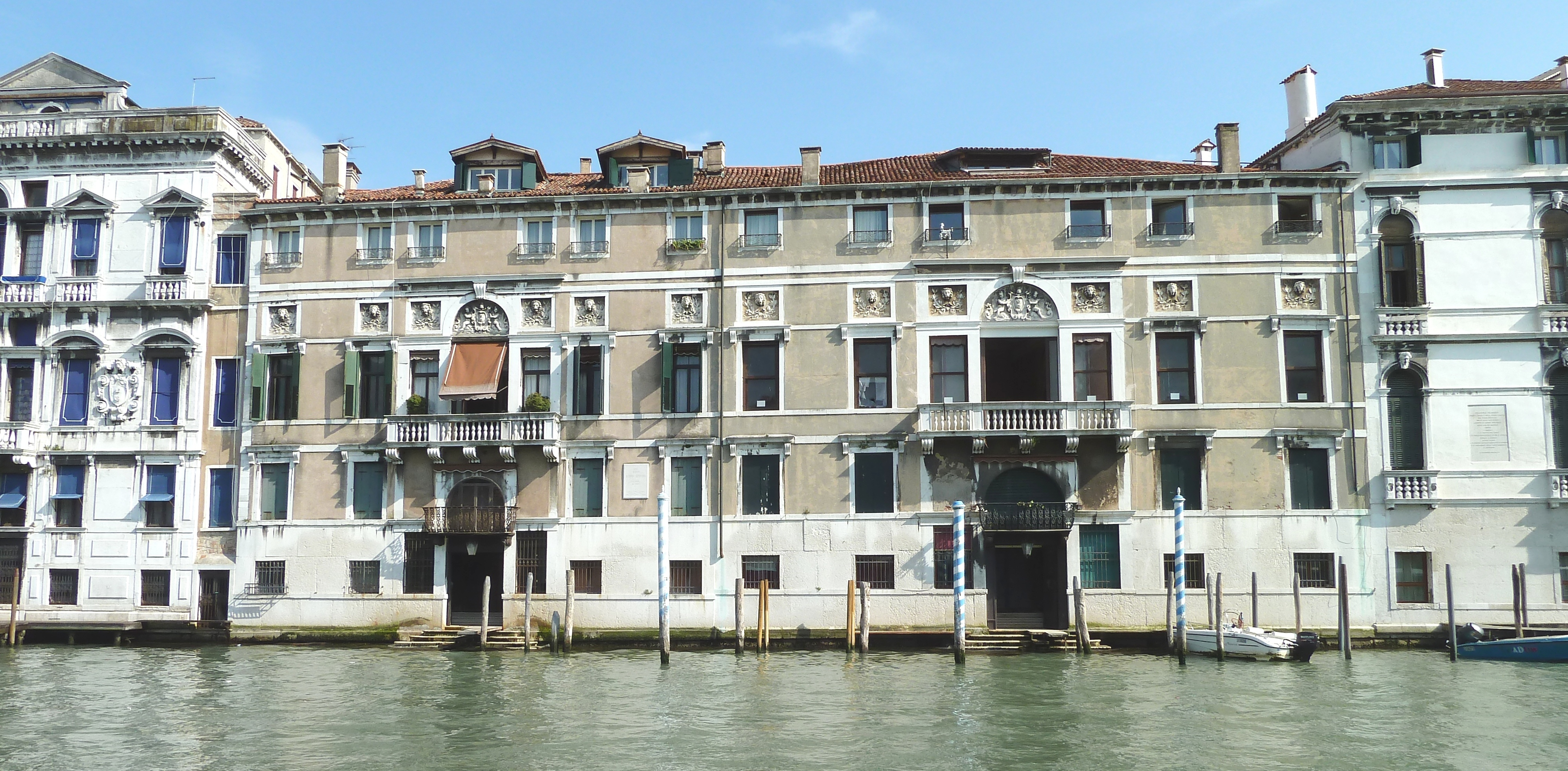
View of the Palazzo Mocenigo detto "il Nero"

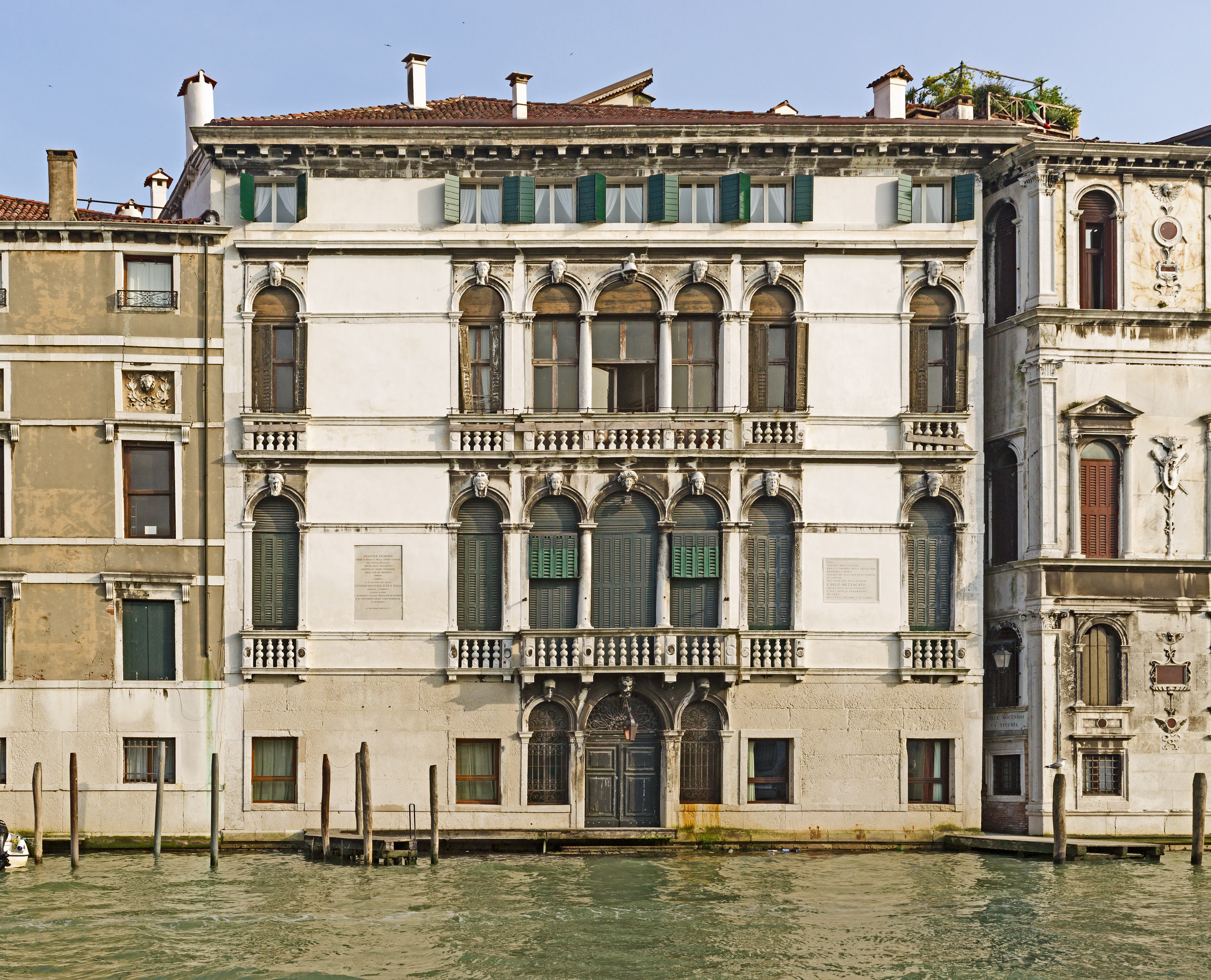
View of the Palazzo Mocenigo Case Vecchia

The Palazzi Mocenigo consist of the following complex of palazzos on the Grand Canal in Venice, Italy:

- Palazzo Mocenigo Casa Nuova
- Palazzo Mocenigo detto "il Nero"
- Palazzo Mocenigo Casa Vecchia

The palazzos are named after the Mocenigo family, seven of whom were Doges of Venice. The English poet Lord Byron (1788–1824) stayed here when he lived in Venice from 1818.
