= Palazzo Barbarigo Nani Mocenigo =

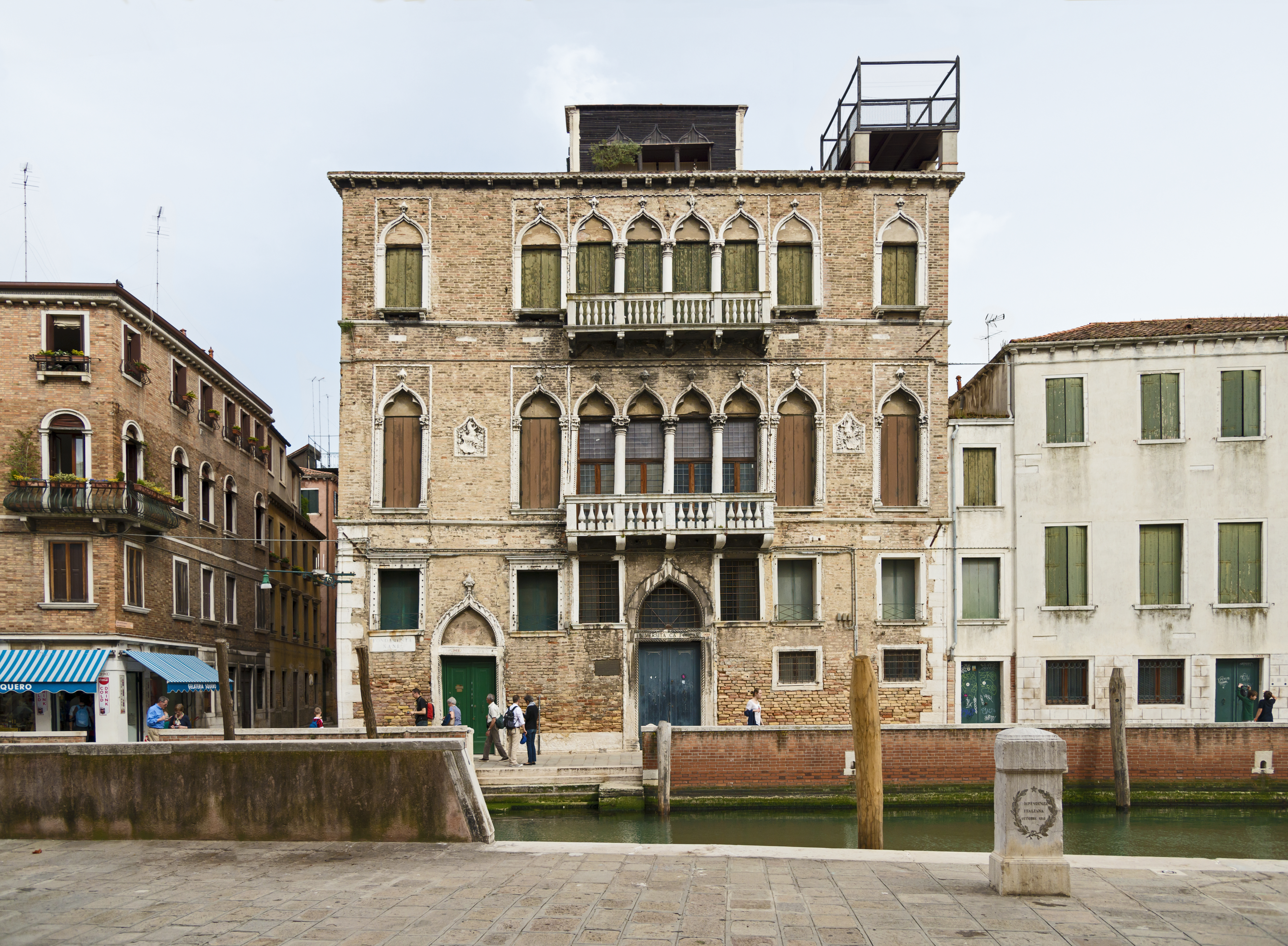
- Palazzo Barbarigo Nani Mocenigo
- Interactive map of the Palazzo Barbarigo Nani Mocenigo area

General information
- Type: Residential
- Architectural style: Gothic
- Location: Dorsoduro district, Venice, Italy
- Coordinates: 45°25′48.63″N 12°19′34.45″E
- Construction stopped: 15th century

Technical details
- Floor count: 4

Palazzo Barbarigo Nani Mocenigo is a Gothic palace in Venice, Italy located in the Dorsoduro district, along the Nani embankment on the San Trovaso canal, near the Campo San Trovaso.

== History ==
The palace dates to the 15th century and was the residence of the Barbarigo family. The building was part of the dowry that Elena Barbarigo, a daughter of Doge Agostino Barbarigo, brought to her husband Giorgio Nani. From them the palace passed to his son Bernardo, a founder of the family branch named di San Trovaso. In the first half of the 19th century, the San Trovaso branch died out, and the complex became the home of the distant relatives of Nani Mocenigo who previously lived in a building on the Cannaregio district.

Part of the building still belongs to this family, while the rest was purchased by the Ca' Foscari University, which made it the seat of the Department of Italian Studies, along with an adjoining library. Starting in 2007, the building remained empty for several years, sometimes being rented out to wealthy tourists or used for art events. As of 2022, it houses the Hotel Nani Mocenigo Palace.

== Architecture ==
The palace is a typical example of Venetian Gothic architecture of the 14-15th centuries. The square-shaped façade has three levels and a mezzanine. The ground floor offers two Gothic portals: the central one and the smaller one on the left. The two noble floors have central quadriforas supported by balustrades and flanked by pairs of ogival single-light windows. The first noble floor has a pair of coats of arms in the wings.

On the right side of the roof, there is a terrace overlooking the San Trovaso and Giudecca Canal area.

== See also ==
- Palazzo Barbarigo
- Palazzo Mocenigo Gambara
- Palazzo Nani
