= Trifora =

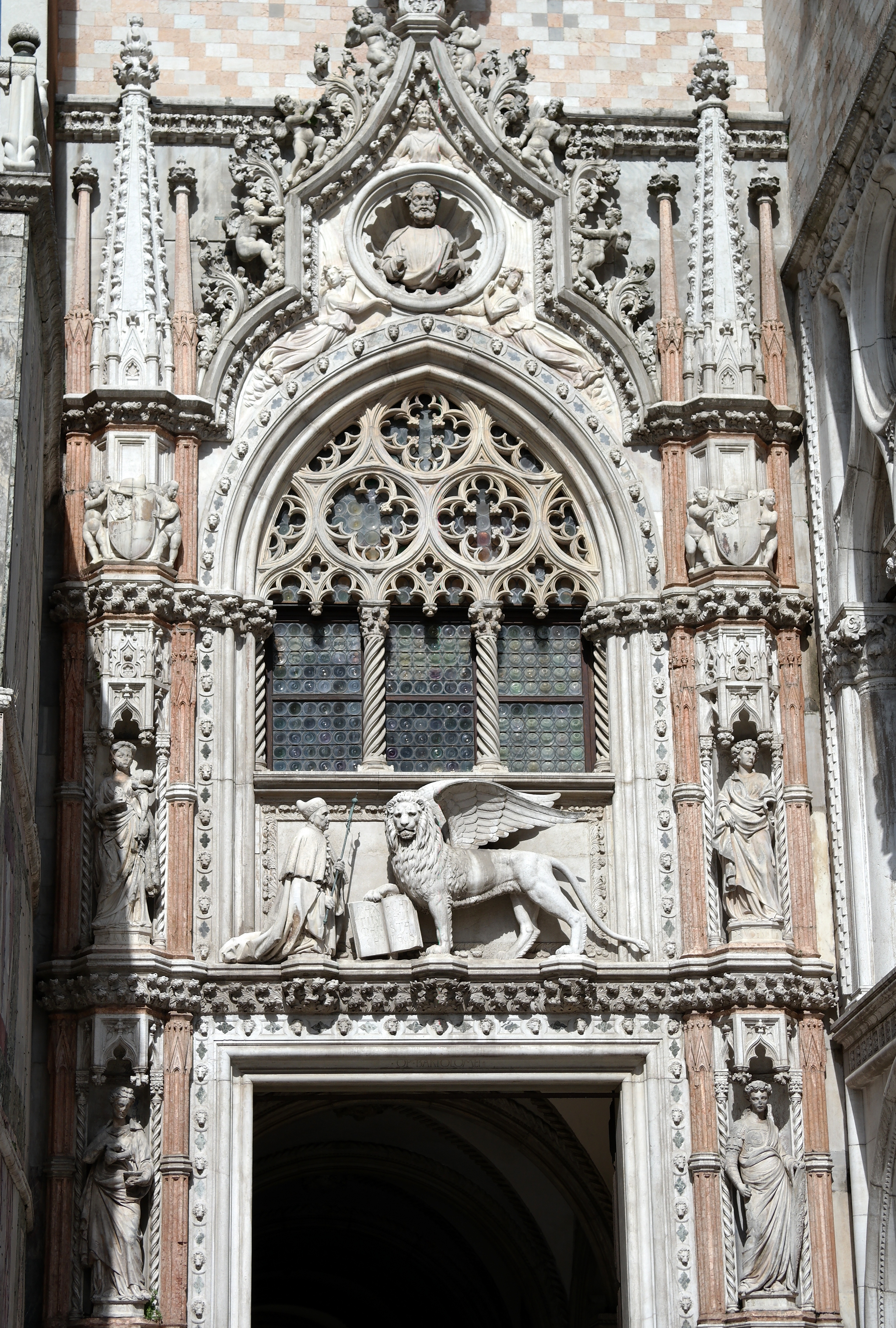
A trifora over Porta della carta, Doge's Palace, Venice

Trifora is a type of three-light window. The trifora usually appears in towers and belfries—on the top floors, where it is necessary to lighten the structure with wider openings.

== Overview ==
The trifora has three openings divided by two small columns or pilasters, on which rest three arches, round or acute. Sometimes, the whole trifora is framed by a further large arch. The space among arches is usually decorated by a coat of arms or a circular opening. Less popular than the mullioned window, the trifora was, however, widely used in the Romanesque, Gothic, and Renaissance periods. Later, the window was mostly forgotten, coming back in vogue in the nineteenth century, in the period of eclecticism and the rediscovery of ancient styles (Neo-Gothic, Neo-Renaissance, and so on). Compared to the mullioned window, the trifora was generally used for larger and more ornate openings.

== Gallery ==
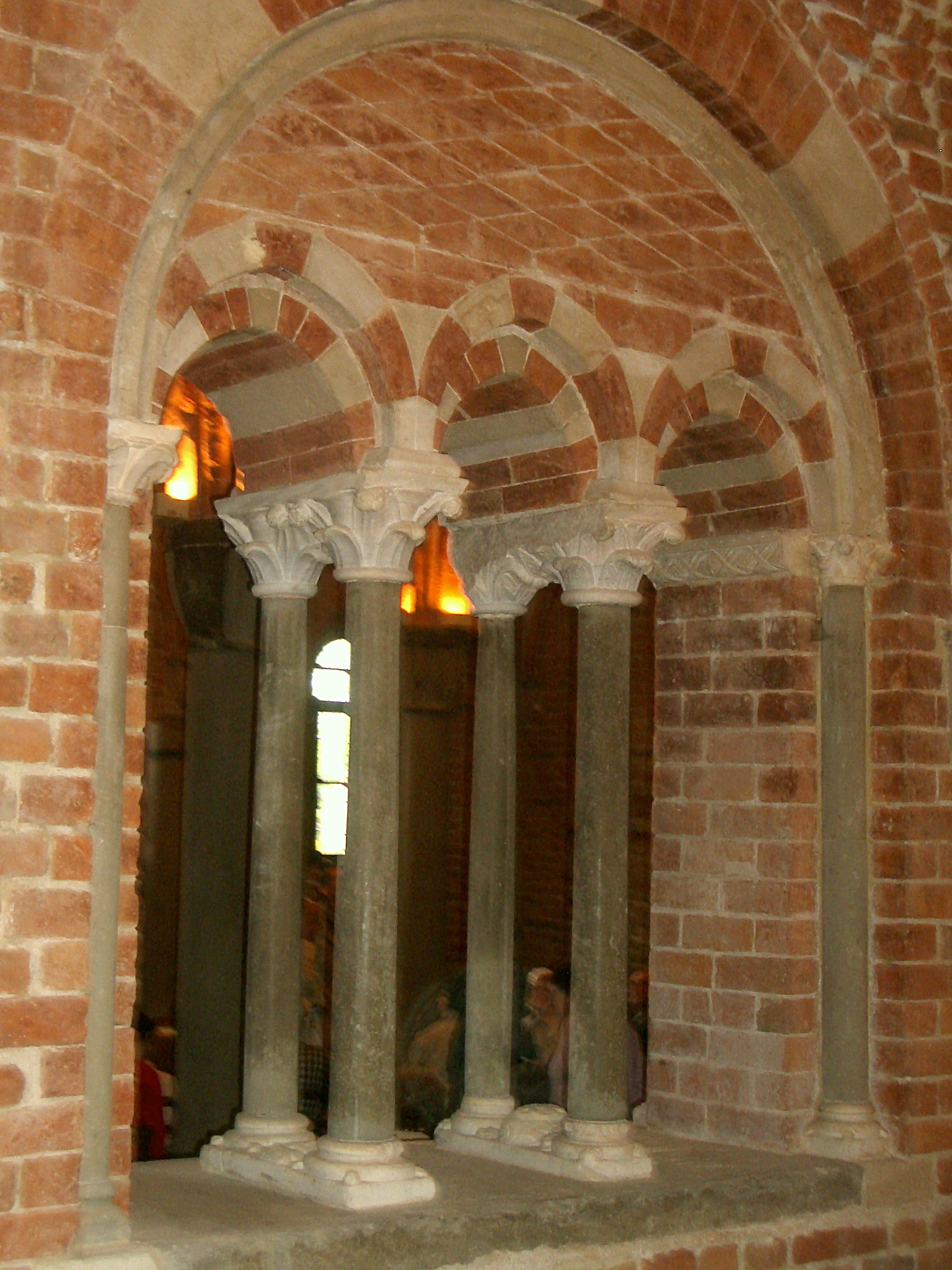
Abbazia di Santa Maria di Rivalta in Tortona

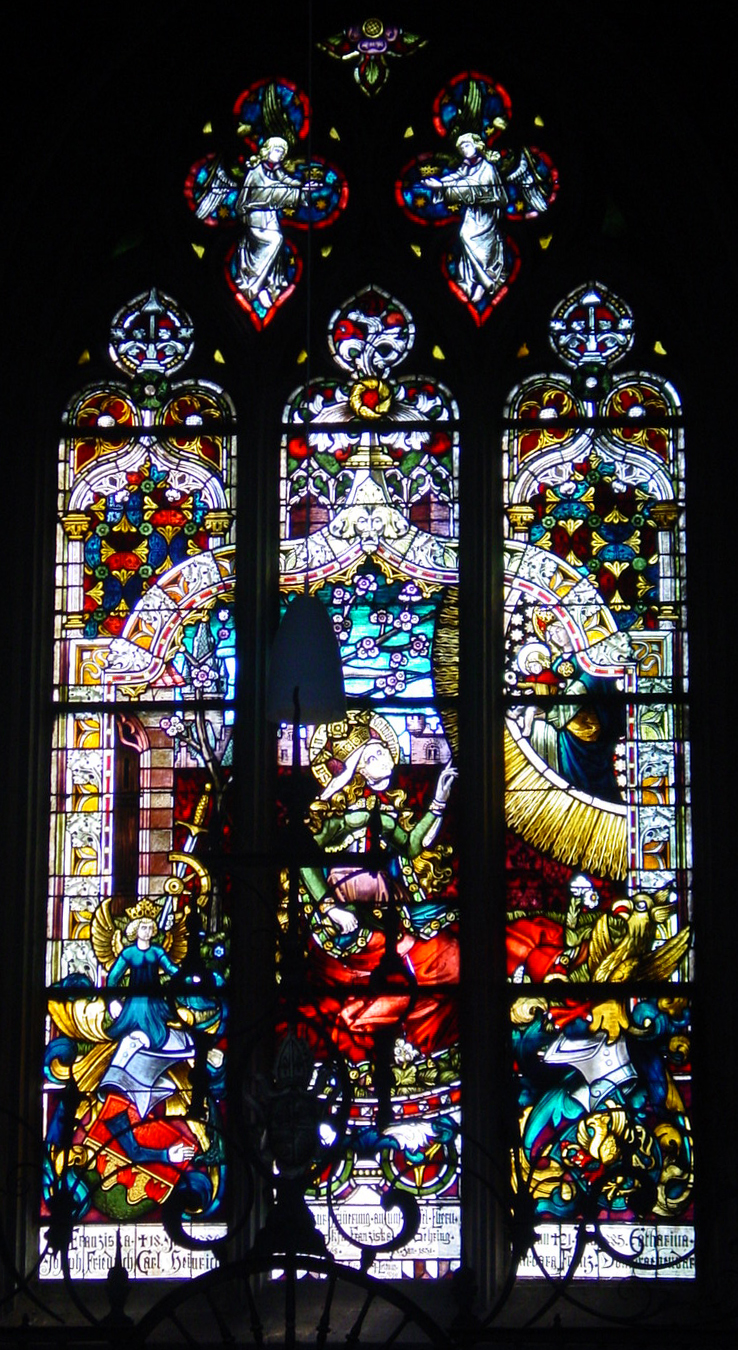
Konstanz Minster

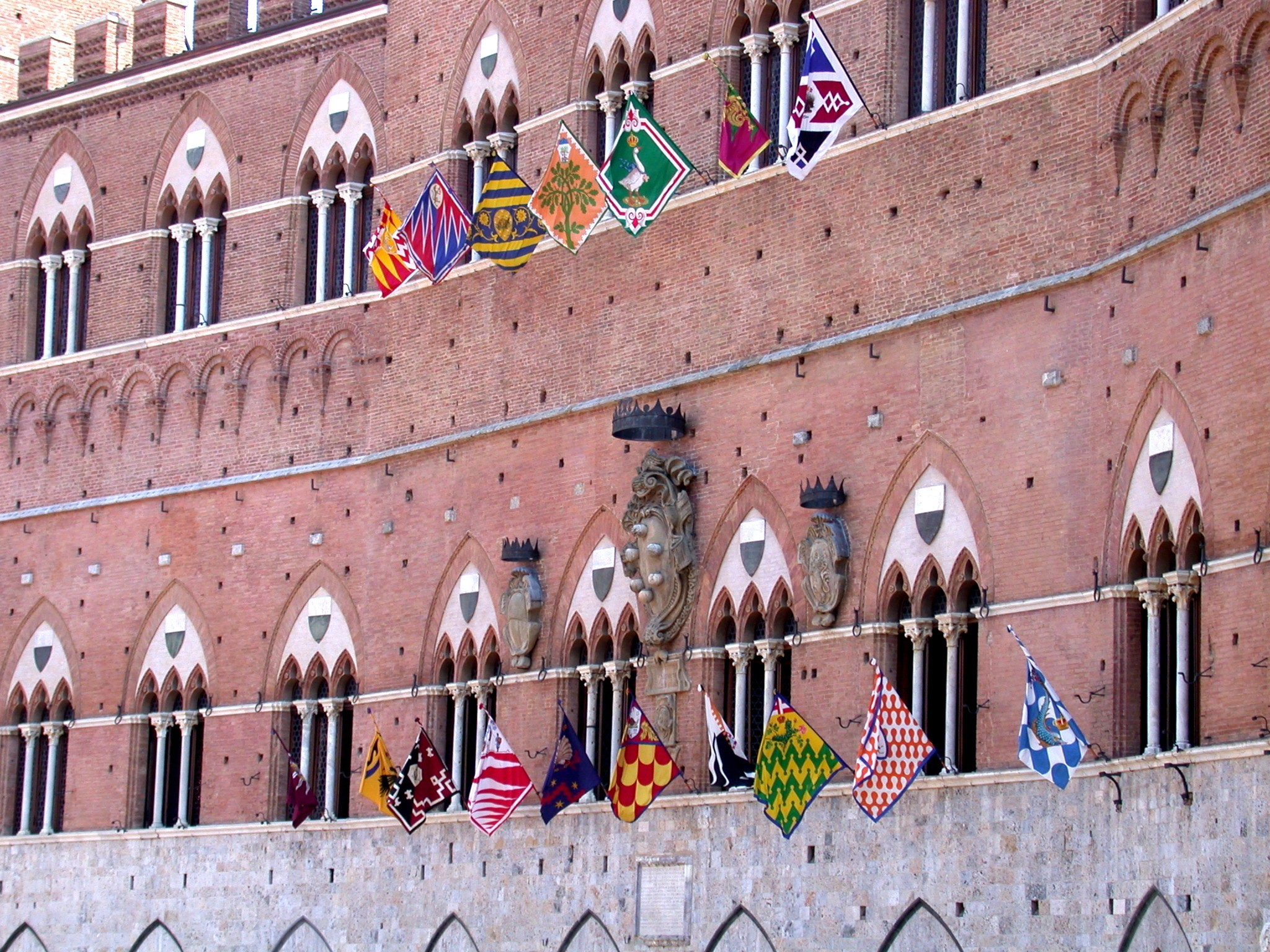
Palazzo Pubblico in Siena

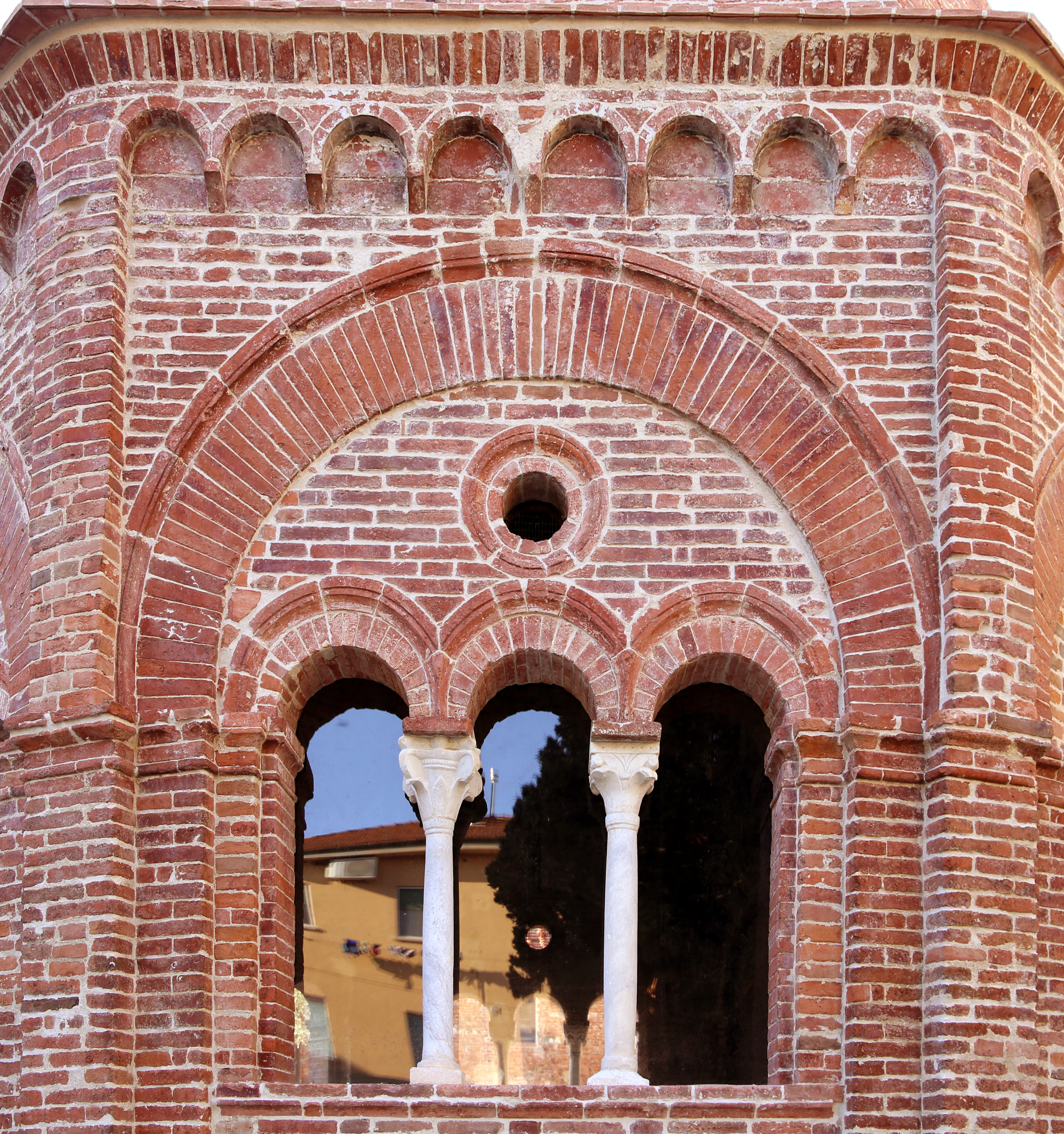
Cappella di Sant'Agata in Pisa

== See also ==
- Monofora
- Bifora (architecture) – Window vertically split into two openings topped by arches
- Quadrifora – Type of four-light window
- Polifora
- Diocletian window – Architectural feature of Ancient Roman baths
- Venetian window – Tripartite window
