= Palazzo Mocenigo (San Marco) =

Coordinates: 45.4273°N 12.3399°E

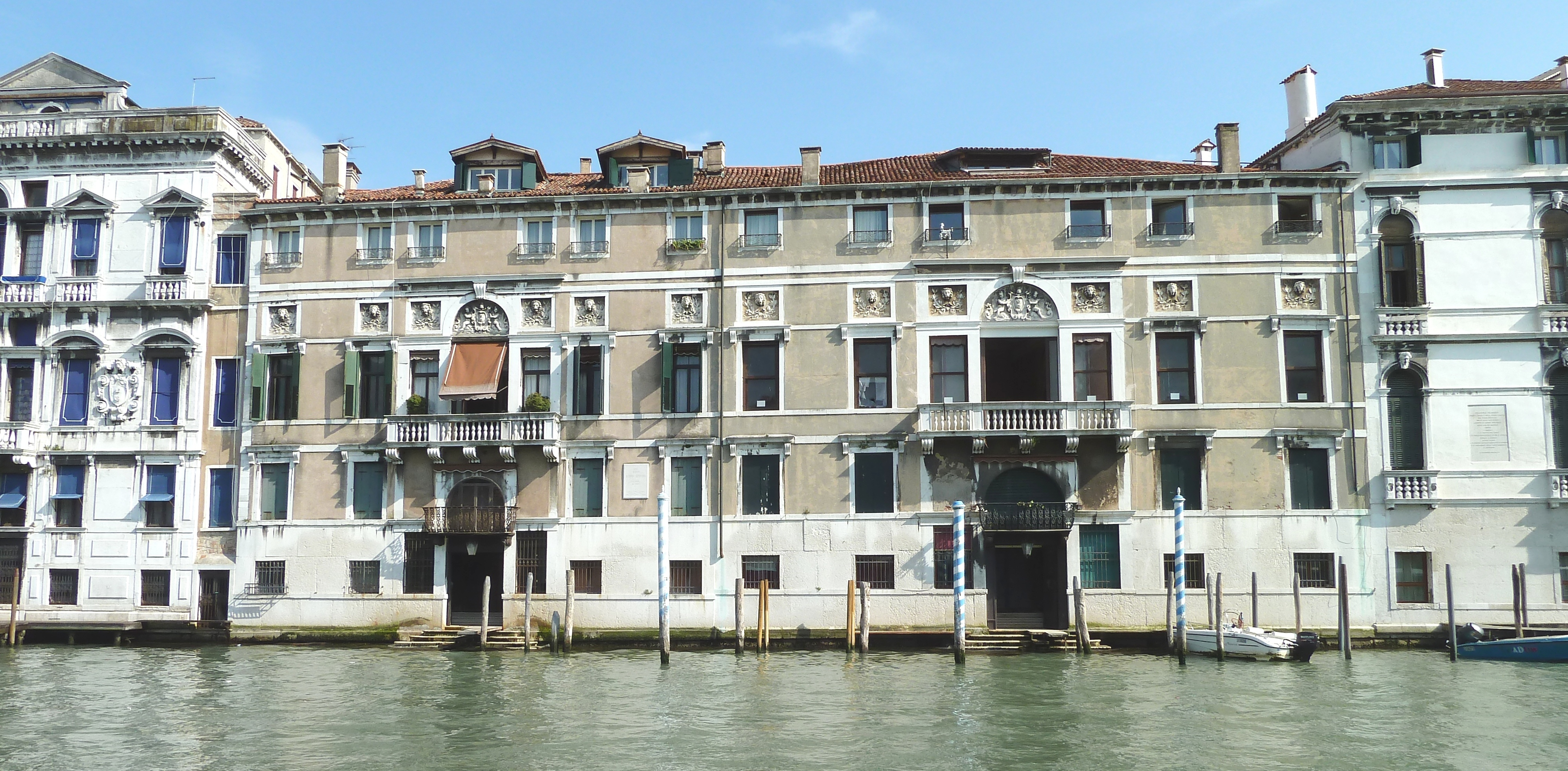
Palazzo Mocenigo on the Grand Canal in Venice.

The Palazzo Mocenigo detto "il Nero" is a palazzo on the Grand Canal in Venice, Italy. Other Palazzi Mocenigo on each side include the Palazzo Mocenigo Casa Nuova and the Palazzo Mocenigo Casa Vecchia. The palazzo is located between the Rialto Bridge and St Mark's Square. It was occupied by the English poet Lord Byron (1788–1824) when he lived in Venice.

The original Palazzo Mocenigo consisted four different buildings built for the Mocenigo family, seven of whom were Doges of Venice. The Palazzo Mocenigo was built by Alvise Mocenigo in about 1579. In 1788, the individual palazzos were linked by Alvise Giovanni Mocenigo, who was procurator of Saint Mark (and later Doge), to form a 40-room building complex that he used for entertainment.

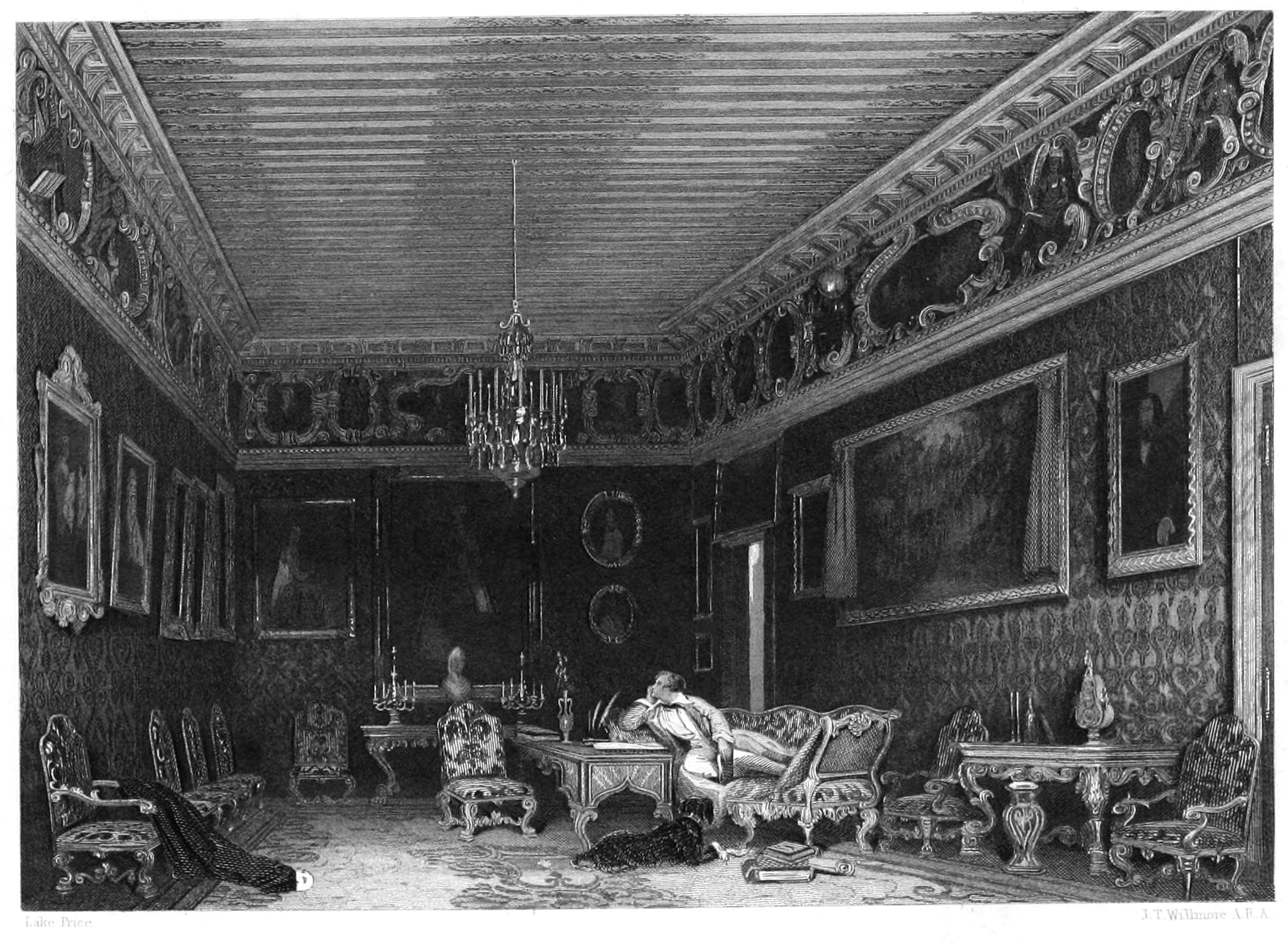
Lord Byron's Room in the Palazzo Moncenigo (sic)

Lord Byron stayed in the right-hand part of the central palazzo. The Palazzo Mocenigo passed out of ownership by the Mocenigo family in the late 1800s. It changed hands again in 1929 and was put up for sale in 2005.

== See also ==
- Palazzi Mocenigo
