= Palazzo Mocenigo Casa Vecchia =

Coordinates: 45.4346°N 12.3294°E

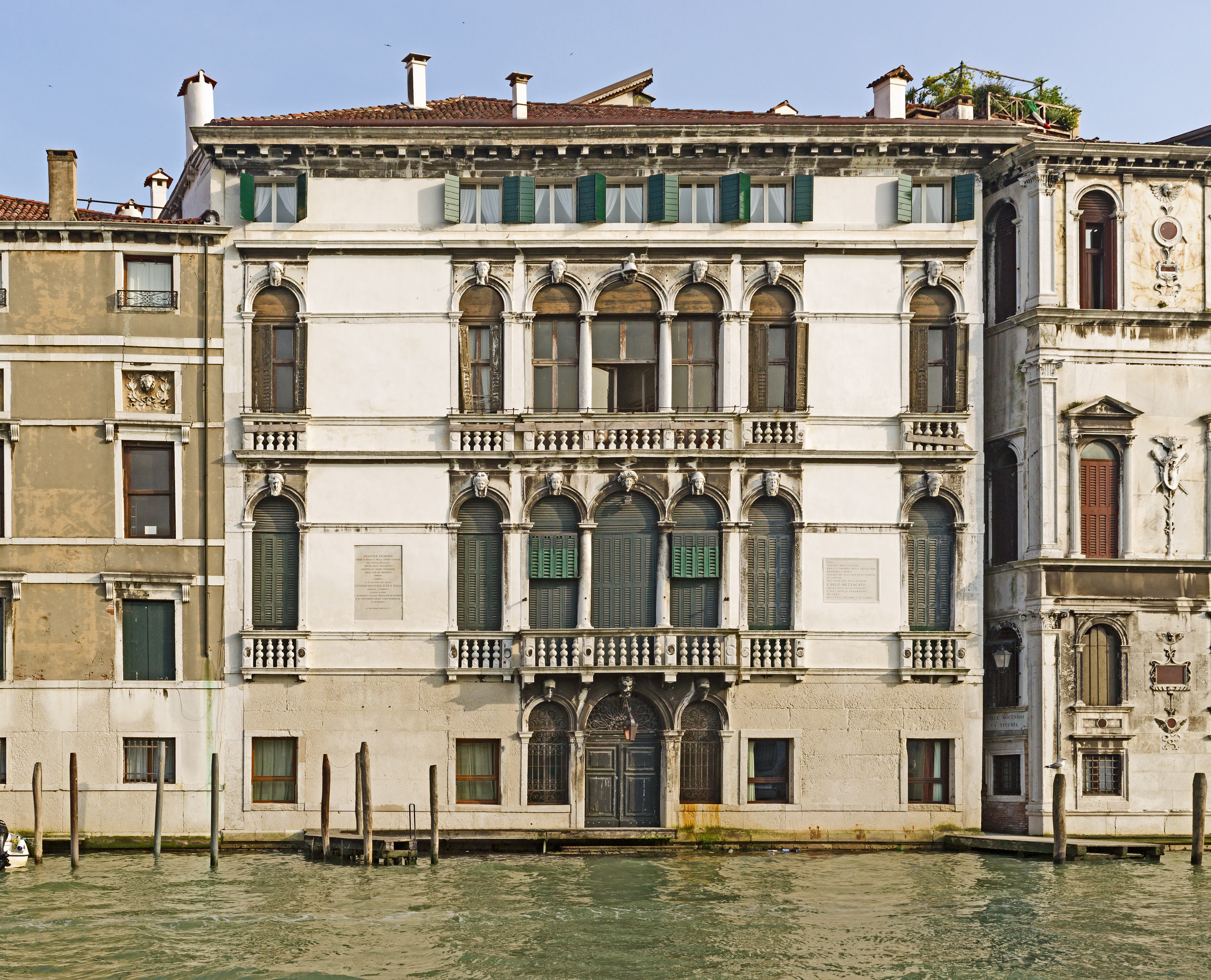
View of the Palazzo Mocenigo Casa Vecchia on the Grand Canal in Venice.

The Palazzo Mocenigo Casa Vecchia is a palazzo on the Grand Canal in the sestiere of San Marco, Venice, Italy.

== Overview ==
The palazzo is located between the Rialto Bridge and St Mark's Square. The original Palazzo Mocenigo consisted of four different buildings built for the Mocenigo family, seven of whom were Doges of Venice. Other Palazzi Mocenigo include the Palazzo Mocenigo Casa Nuova and the Palazzo Mocenigo, forming a building complex designed for entertainment.

== History ==
The palazzo is the first building to the left of the complex on the Grand Canal. Despite the name of "Casa Vecchia" ("Old House"), the palazzo is the newest of the complex. It was rebuilt on the site of an earlier medieval factory building, where the philosopher Giordano Bruno stayed in 1592. It was designed by the architect Francesco Contin and built between 1623 and 1625.

== See also ==
- Palazzi Mocenigo
- Palazzo Mocenigo Casa Nuova

== Sources ==
- Italian Wikipedia: it:Palazzi Mocenigo.
