= Quadrifora =

Type of four-light window

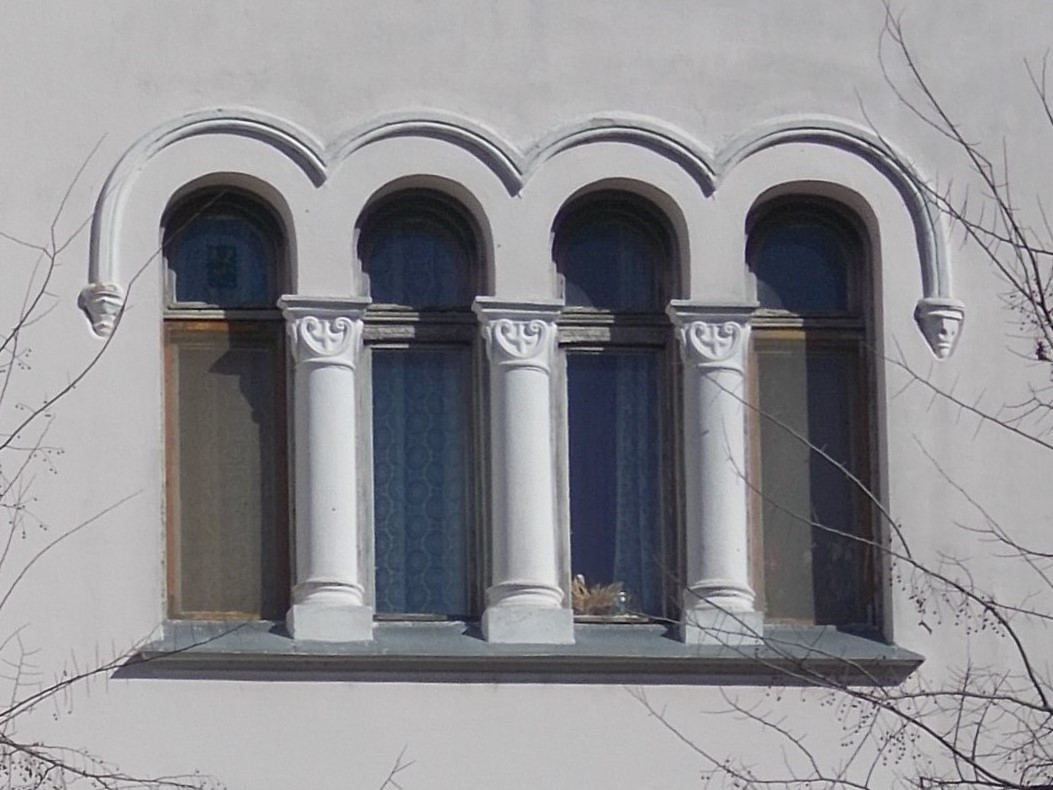
Convent/nunnery of the Kalocsa School sisters named after Our Lady, Hungary. Built in 1860.

Quadrifora is a type of four-light window. It appears in towers and belfries on top floors, where it is necessary to lighten the structure with wider openings. The quadrifora can also be a group closely set windows.

== Overview ==
The quadrifora is divided vertically in four parts by three small columns or pilasters, on which four arches rest, round or pointed. Sometimes, the quadrifora is framed by a further larger arch; the space among the arches may be decorated by a coat of arms or a small circular opening.

Less popular than the bifora or trifora, the quadrifora was nevertheless used in the Romanesque, Gothic, and Renaissance periods. In the 19th century, it came back in vogue in the period of eclecticism and the revival of old styles. Compared to the trifora, the quadrifora was generally used for larger and more ornate openings.

== Gallery ==
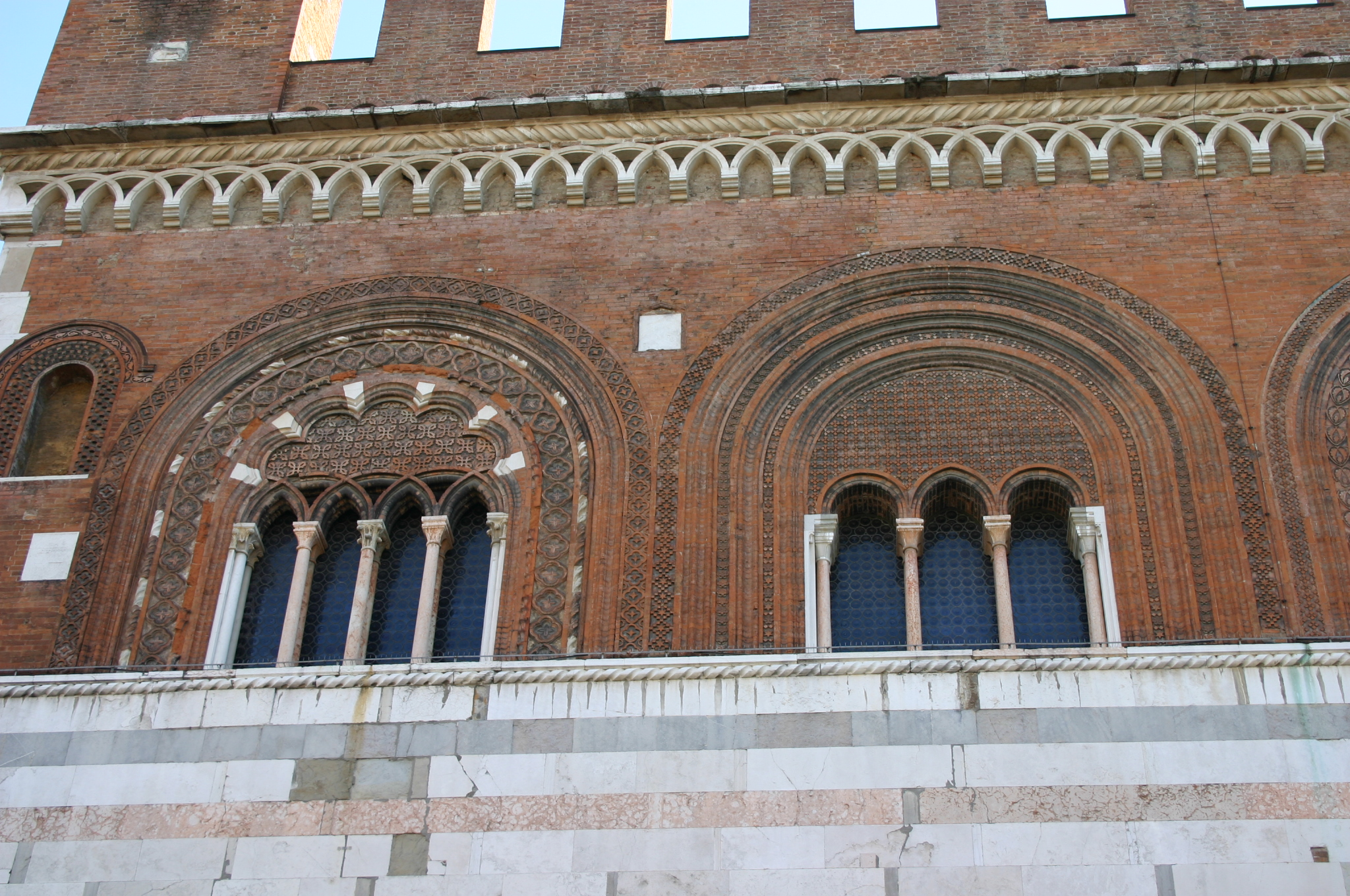
Quadrifora and trifora of the Palazzo del Comune in Piacenza

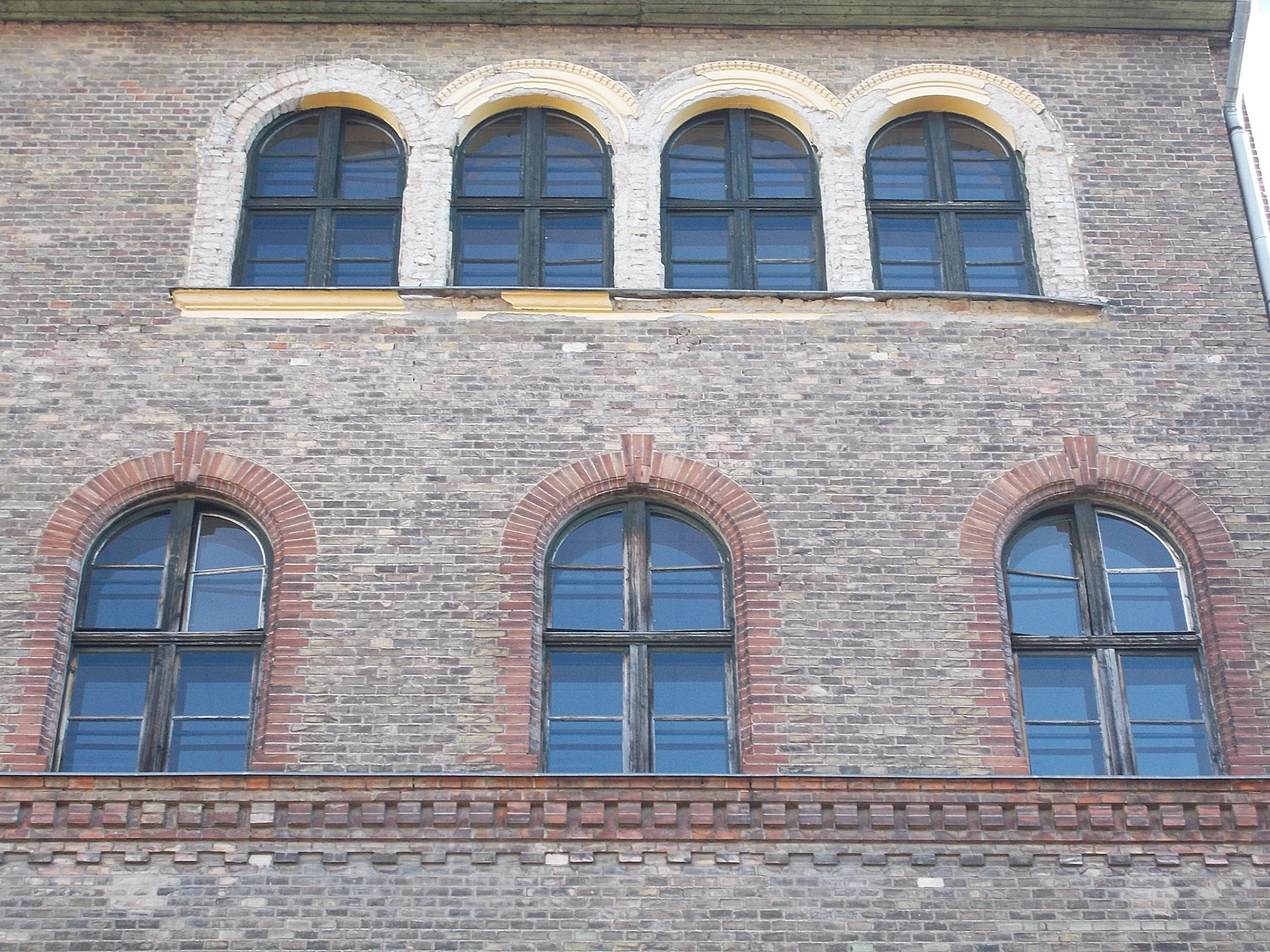
Szent István University, Budapest

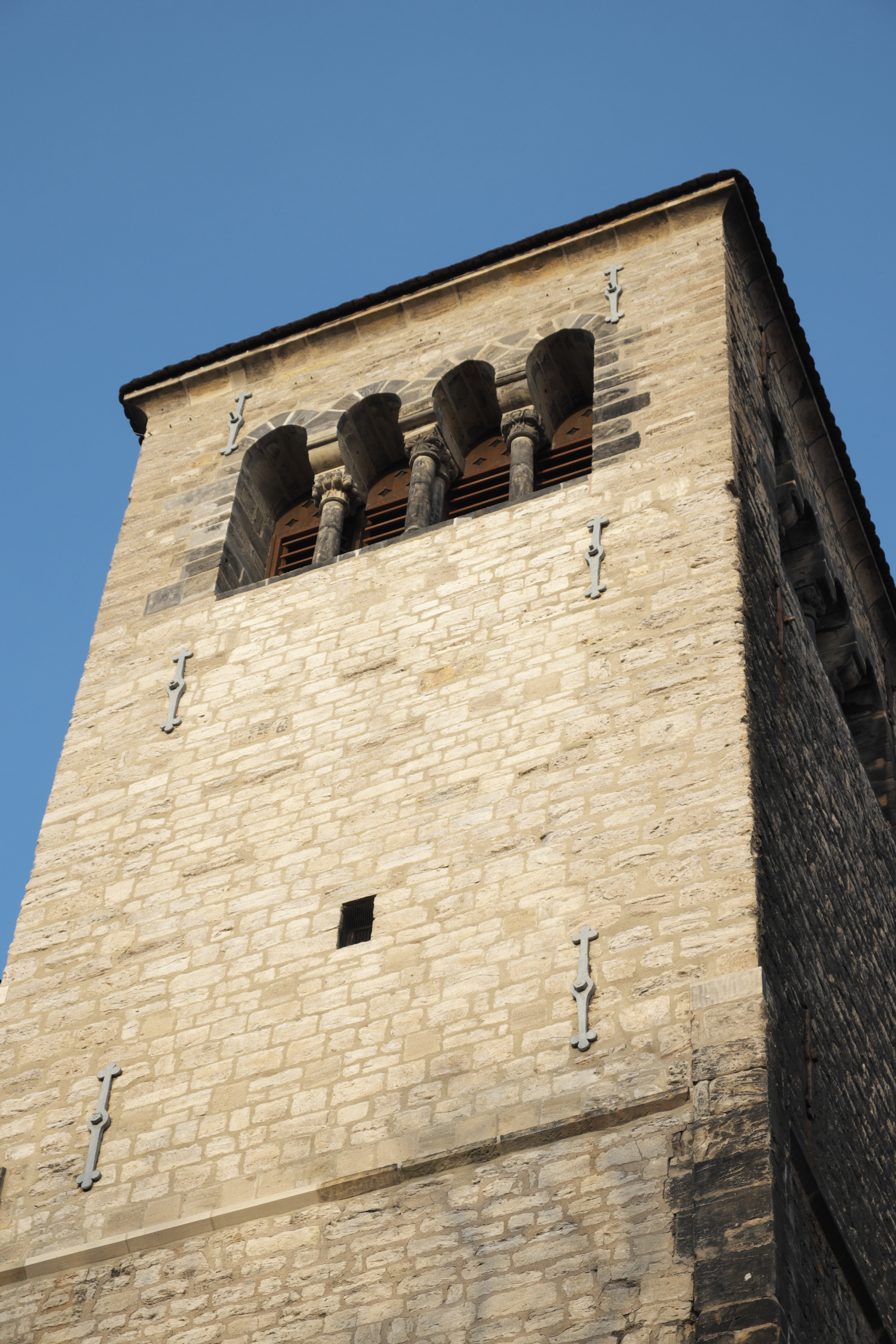
Reglerkirche in Erfurt, Germany

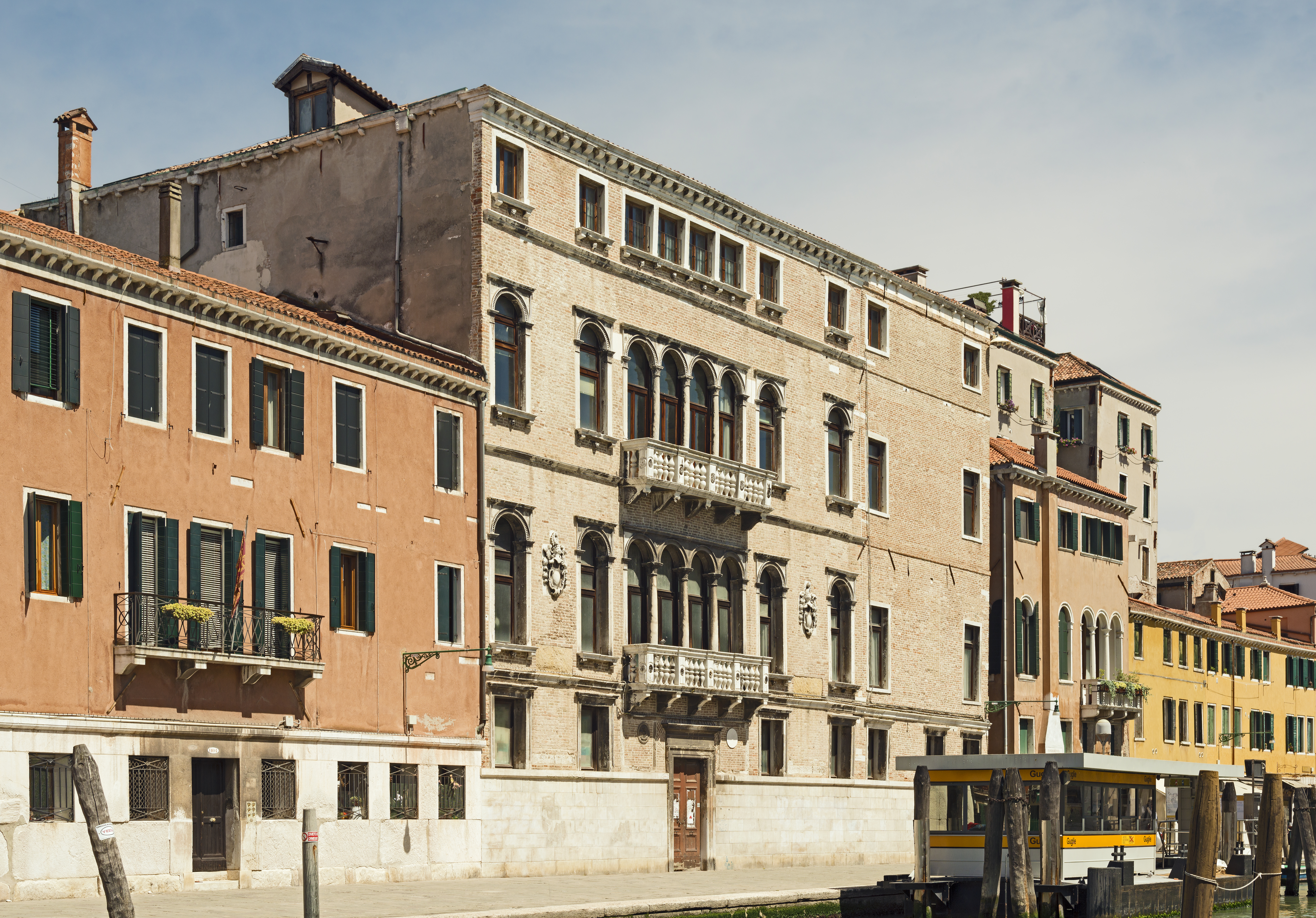
Palazzo Nani, Venice

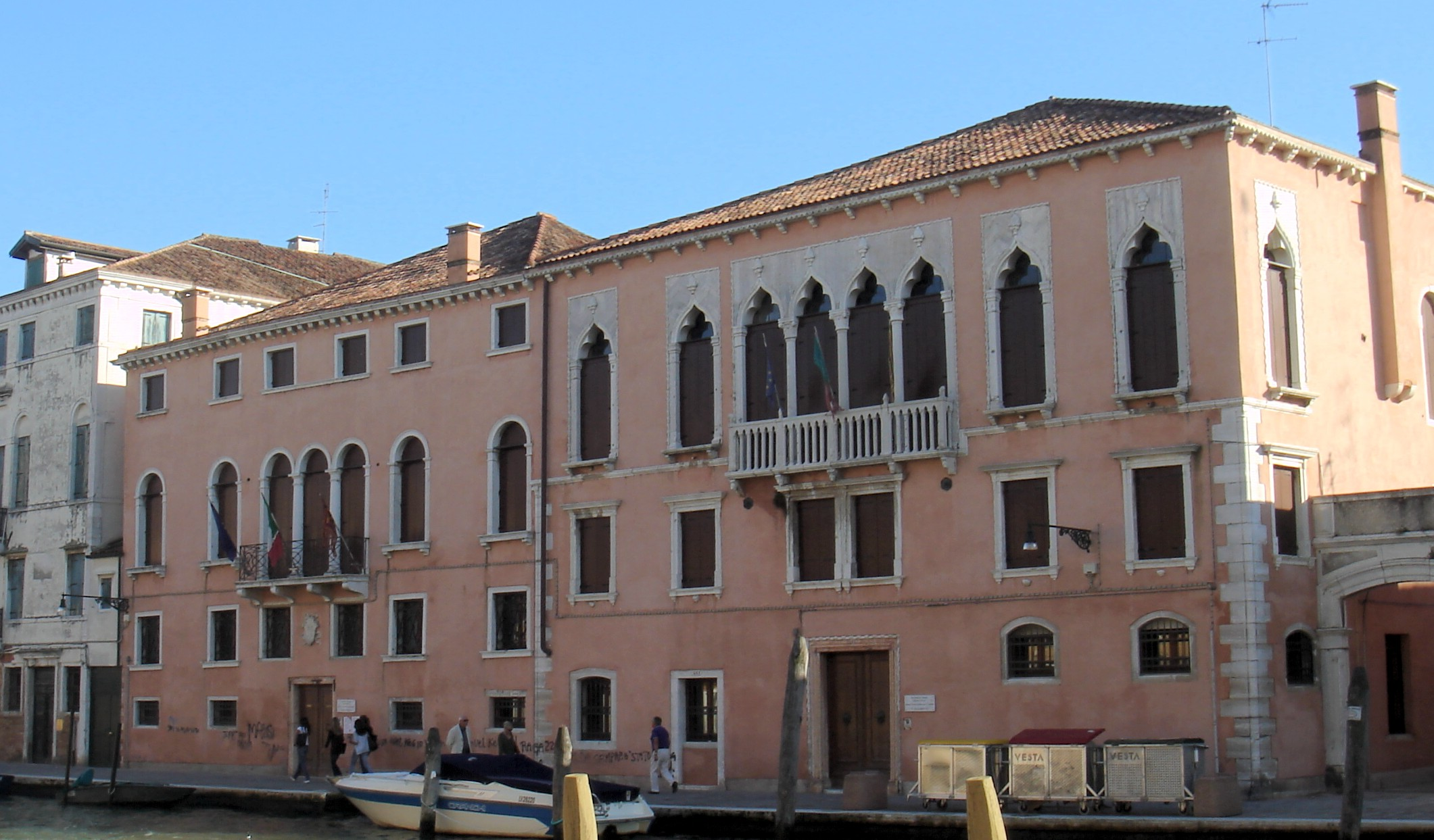
Palazzo Testa, Venice

== See also ==
- Monofora
- Bifora
- Trifora
- Polifora
