= Fire in the Oil Depot at San Marcuola =

1790 painting by Francesco Guardi

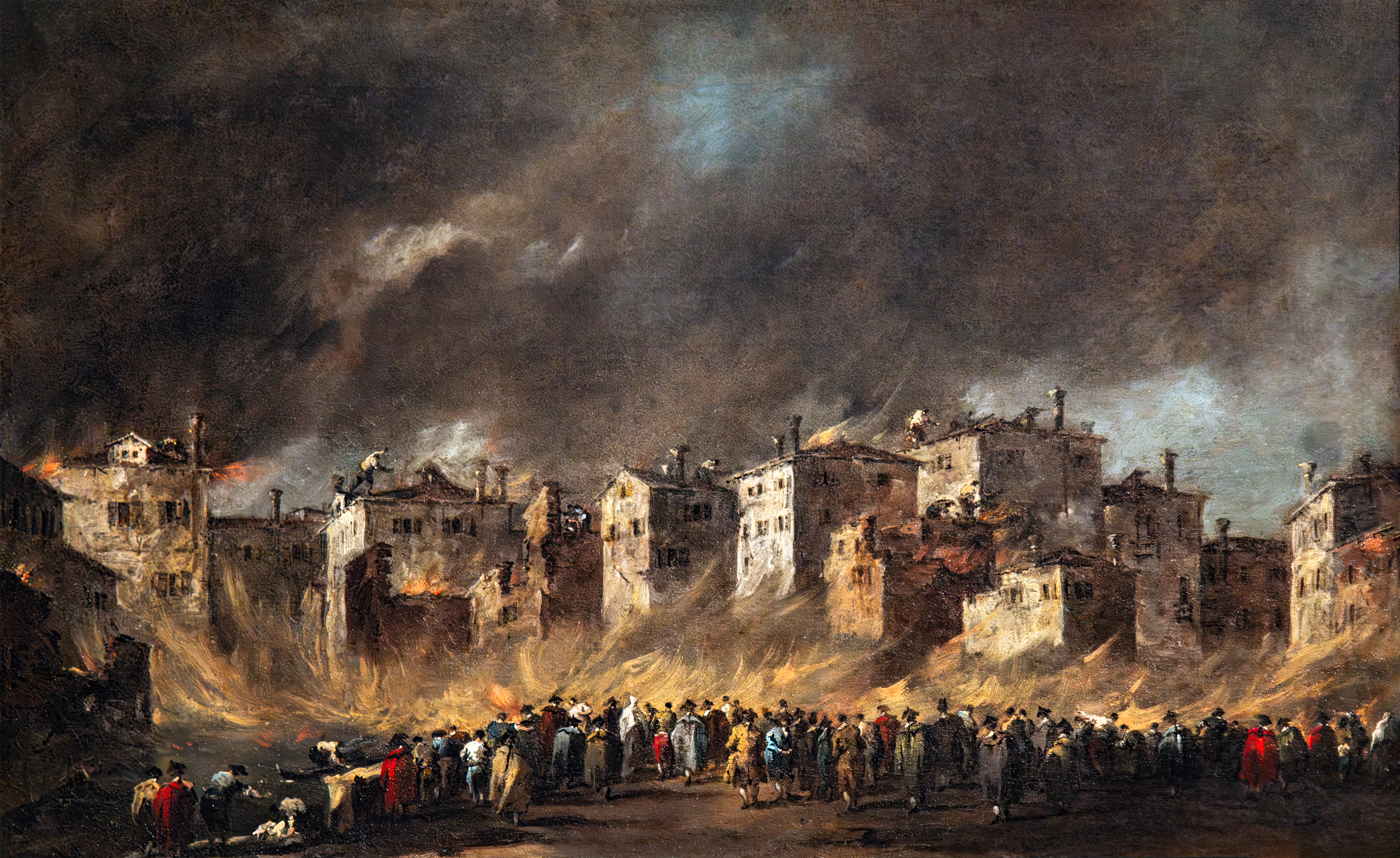
- Artist: Francesco Guardi
- Year: c. 1790
- Medium: oil on canvas
- Dimensions: 42.5 cm × 62.2 cm (16.7 in × 24.5 in)
- Location: Alte Pinakothek, Munich

Fire in the Oil Depot at San Marcuola is an oil-on-canvas painting by the Venetian vedutista Francesco Guardi, created c. 1790. It has small dimensions and is in the Alte Pinakothek, in Munich. It was one of the last paintings by Guardi who died in 1792.

== History and description ==
The painting is based on a fire that broke out at night on November 28, 1789, in the district of Cannareggio, near the church of San Marcuola. The fire appears to be burning oil on the waters of a canal. In the foreground of the painting, a crowd of men has gathered to witness the event. In the buildings in the background, there appear to be men on rooftops appearing to fight the fire.

There is a drawing in pen and brush, owned by the Metropolitan Museum of Art.
