= Palazzo Gritti =

Building in Venice, Italy

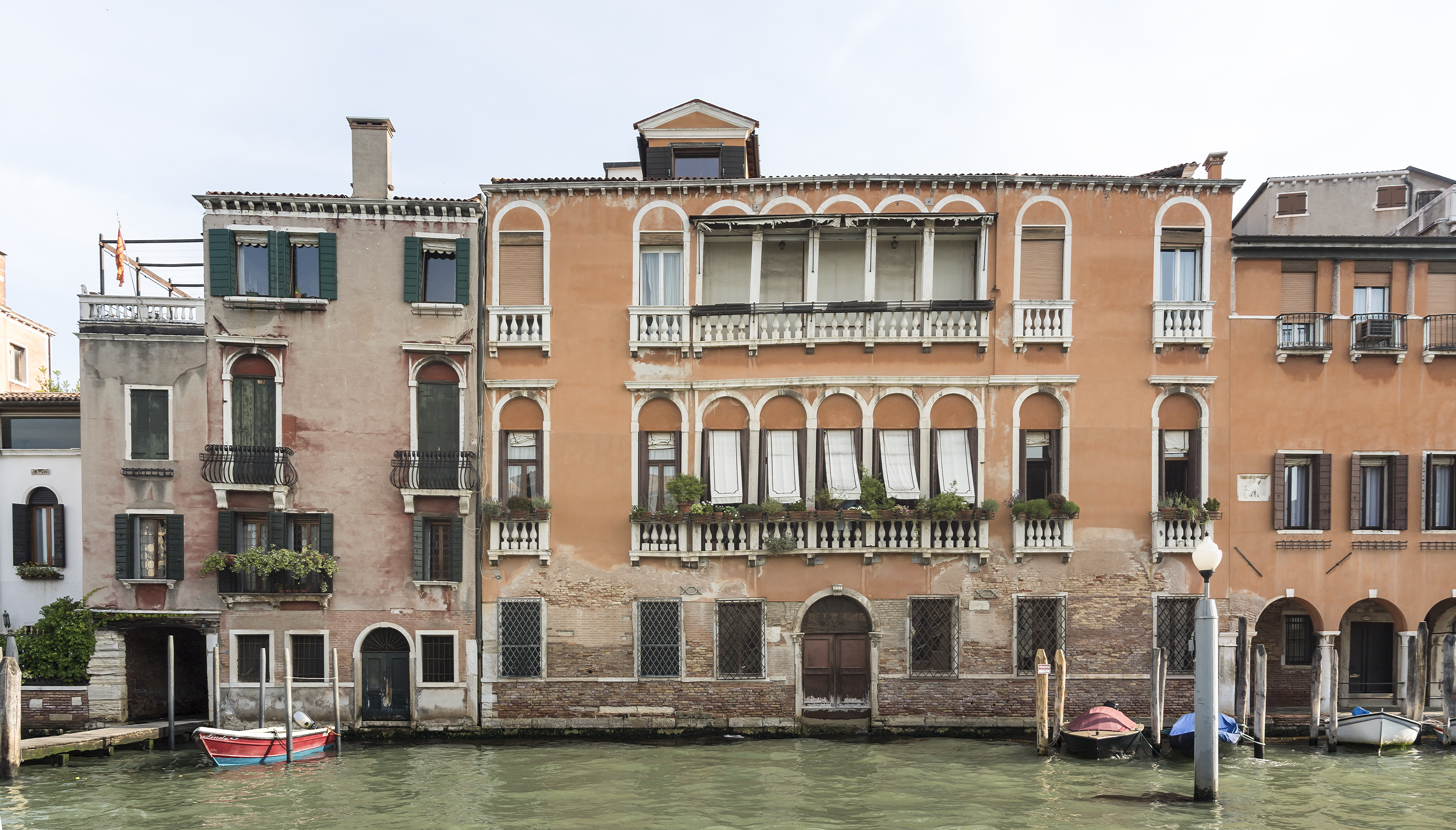
- Casa Lucatello and Palazzo Gritti Dandolo; facades on Grand Canal.
- Interactive map of the Palazzo Gritti area

General information
- Type: Residential
- Architectural style: Venetian Renaissance
- Location: Cannaregio district, Venice, Italy
- Coordinates: 45°26′33.64″N 12°19′40.43″E
- Construction stopped: 16th century

Technical details
- Floor count: 3

Palazzo Gritti (also Palazzo Gritti Dandolo) is a palace in Venice, Italy, located in the Cannaregio district and overlooking the Grand Canal between Palazzo Memmo Martinengo Mandelli and Palazzo Correr Contarini Zorzi.

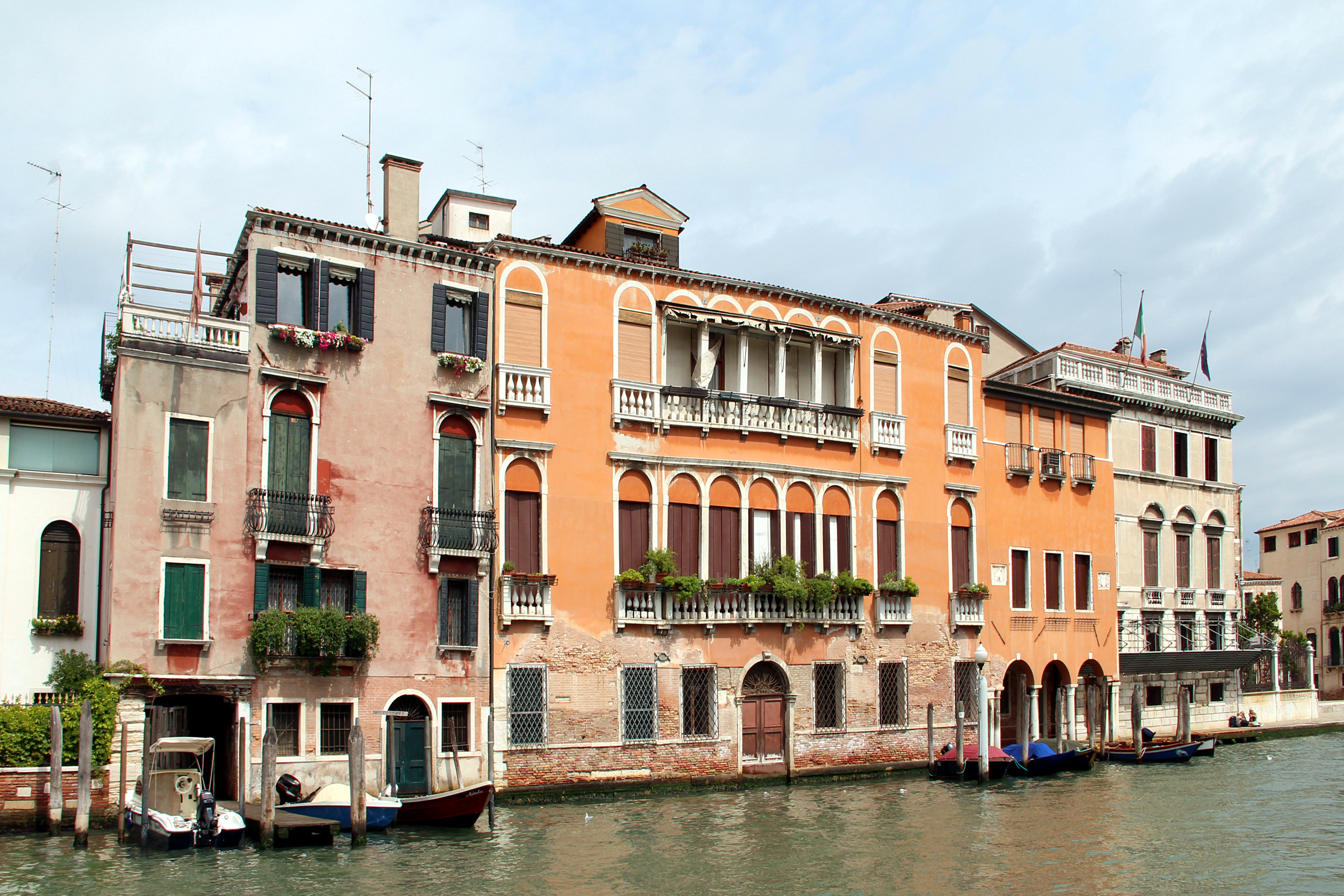
The Gritti Palace or Gritti Dandolo, built in the Cannaregio sestiere on the right bank of the Canal Grande.

== History ==
The palace is of medieval origin, bearing the classic lines of the Venetian Gothic architecture. Palazzo Gritti was subjected to a heavy renovation in the 17th century, when its geometry was radically altered, but not its size.

== Architecture ==
The façade consists of three levels, featuring a large a round-headed portal on the ground floor, with direct access to the canal. The two noble floors have a symmetrical structure and are decorated by pentaforas in the central parts flanked by pairs of single-lancet windows on each side; all these openings have stone balustrades. To the right of the main structure there is a smaller building belonging to the Palazzo Gritti complex. It is also of three floors, with a portico supported by small columns on the ground floor; on the façade there are two bas-reliefs, depicting the coats of arms of the Gritti and the Dandolo families, who were the respective owners. This minor building is originally of the 16th century but was rebuilt in the 19th century.

== See also ==
- Palazzo Dandolo
- Palazzo Dandolo Paolucci
