= Christ Washing the Disciples' Feet (Tintoretto) =

Motif by Jacopo Tintoretto in at least six versions from Venice

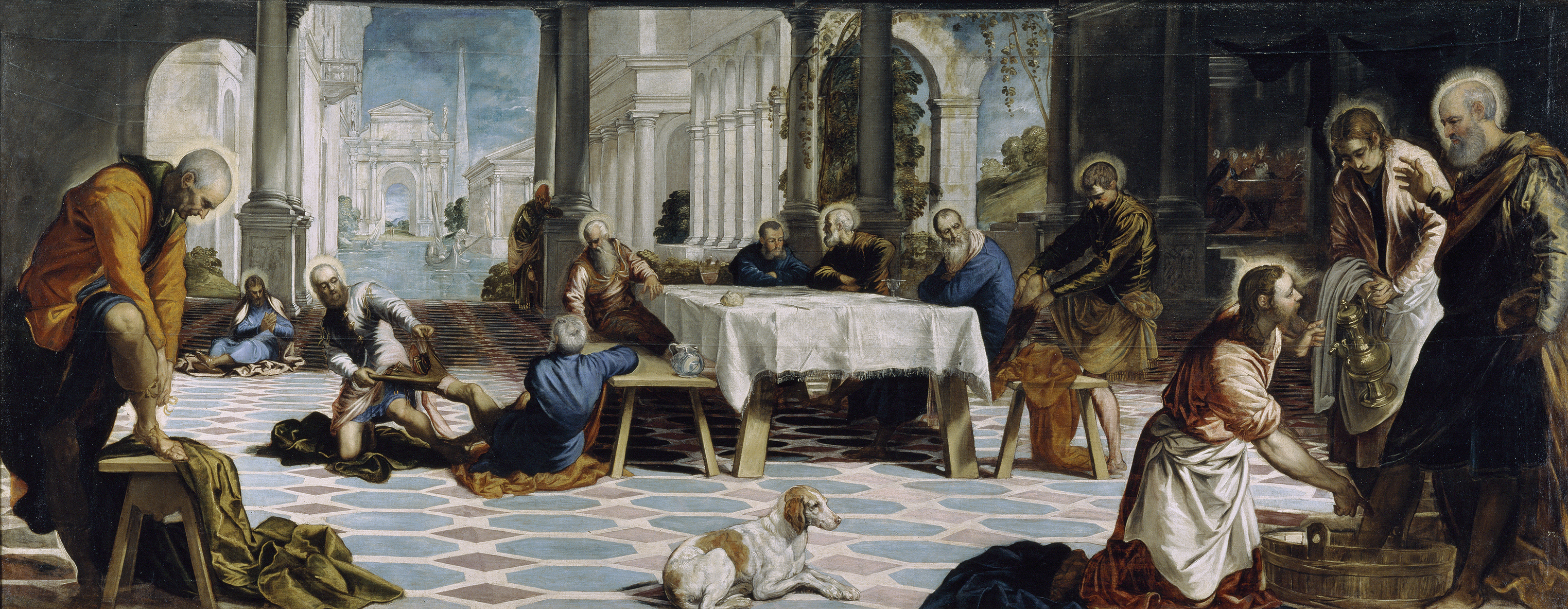
- Artist: Tintoretto
- Year: 1548–1549
- Medium: Oil on canvas
- Dimensions: 228 cm × 533 cm (90 in × 210 in)
- Location: Museo del Prado, Madrid

Christ Washing the Disciples' Feet was a favourite theme of Tintoretto, and there are at least six known works by him on the subject. The scene comes from a passage in John 13 where before the Last Supper Christ washes the feet of his disciples. This passage called for a complex image with many characters in a variety of poses and motions, and the diversity and challenge attracted Tintoretto. The paintings were commissioned for various churches of Venice, though since then four of the six have left Italy.

== Prado version and Shipley versions ==
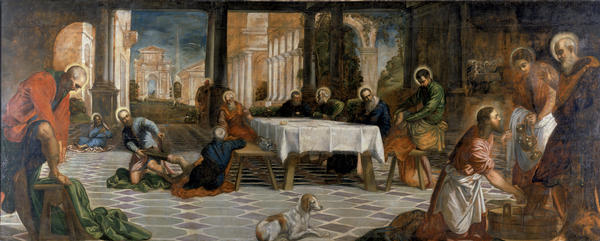
Shipley Art Gallery version

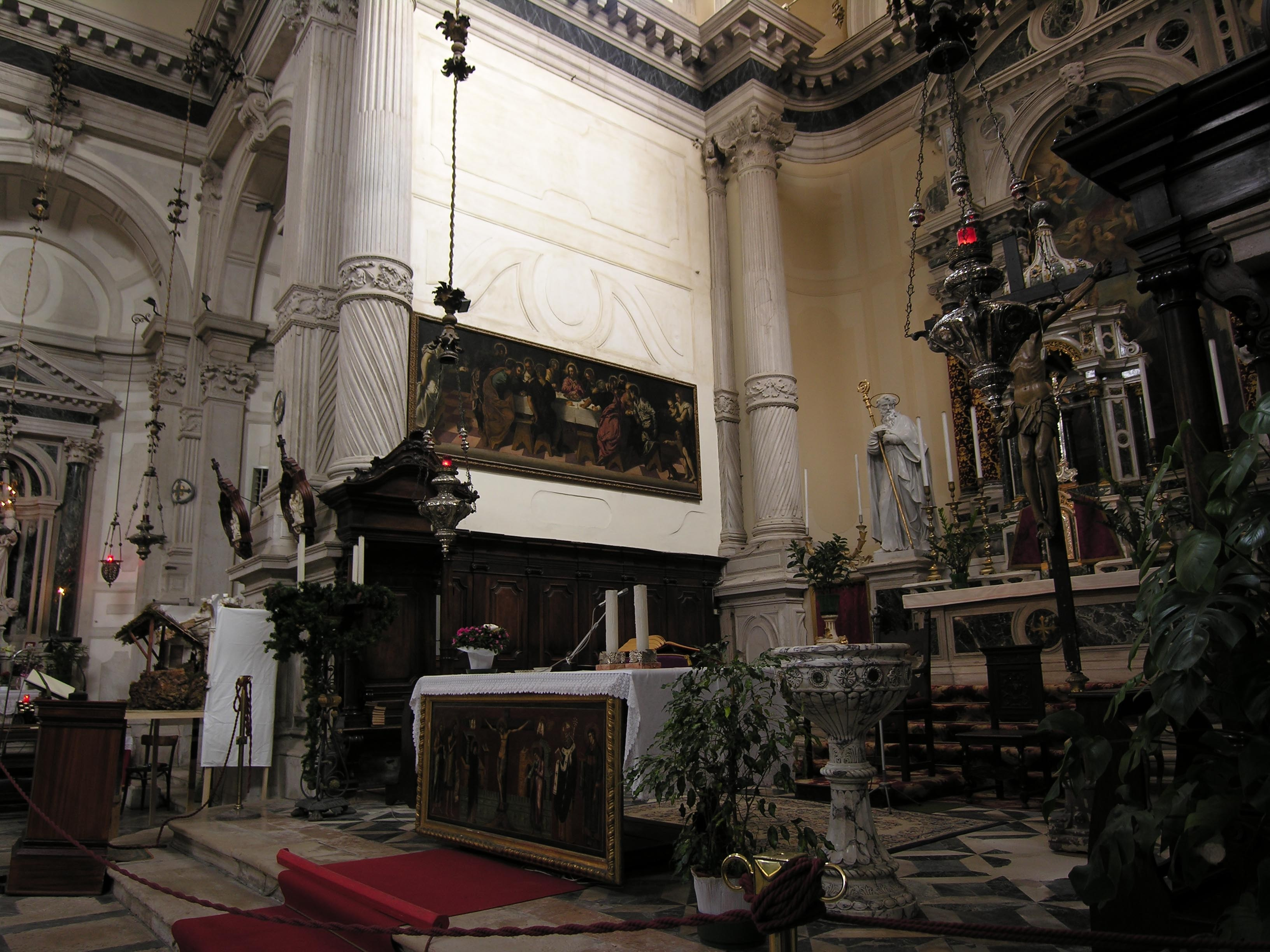
Tintoretto's Last Supper on the left side of the altar at San Marcuola in Venice. The intended place for Christ Washing the Disciples' Feet was on the right side where now is Carlo Ridolfi's copy.

The painting was created in 1548/1549 for a church in Venice. The church of San Marcuola commissioned Christ Washing the Disciples' Feet as a companion piece to Tintoretto's Last Supper, which still hangs at San Marcuola. Christ and St. Peter are at the far right of the image, an unusual position as Christ was typically placed in the centre of any paintings. This is explained by its original positioning in the church on the right side of the altar. Viewing the painting from a side angle allows the perspective of the tiled floor and the gaze of the disciples towards Jesus to emphasise his status as the main subject of the painting. On the far left of the painting is Judas Iscariot, clothed in bright red and noticeably isolated from the other figures of the painting. In the middle of the work are the rest of the disciples gathered around the table that was the site of the supper. They are depicted somewhat humorously as they strive to pull off their stockings. In the background there is a portal above Jesus that opens up to a room where the last supper takes place. The opening to the left shows buildings with elaborate and fantastic architecture. The architecture is based closely on designs by Sebastiano Serlio.

The painting was removed from San Marcuola by the mid-seventeenth century as attested by Carlo Ridolfi. To replace it, Ridolfi himself painted a copy of the painting and this copy remains at San Marcuola. The subsequent history of the original painting is unclear, but it is perhaps the one that is recorded as being part of the collection of King Charles I of England. With the English Civil War much of Charles' collection was broken up. The Tintoretto now in the Prado was purchased in 1654 by Luis Méndez de Haro, who gave it to Philip IV of Spain and with other paintings from the royal collection it eventually went to the Museo del Prado.

There is also a version at the Shipley Art Gallery that has the same overall design as the Prado painting, but varies in many small details. There is debate among scholars over how much of these two works were actually done by Tintoretto and how much was done by his workshop assistants. There is also evidence to suggest that the Shipley Art Gallery may in fact own the original:

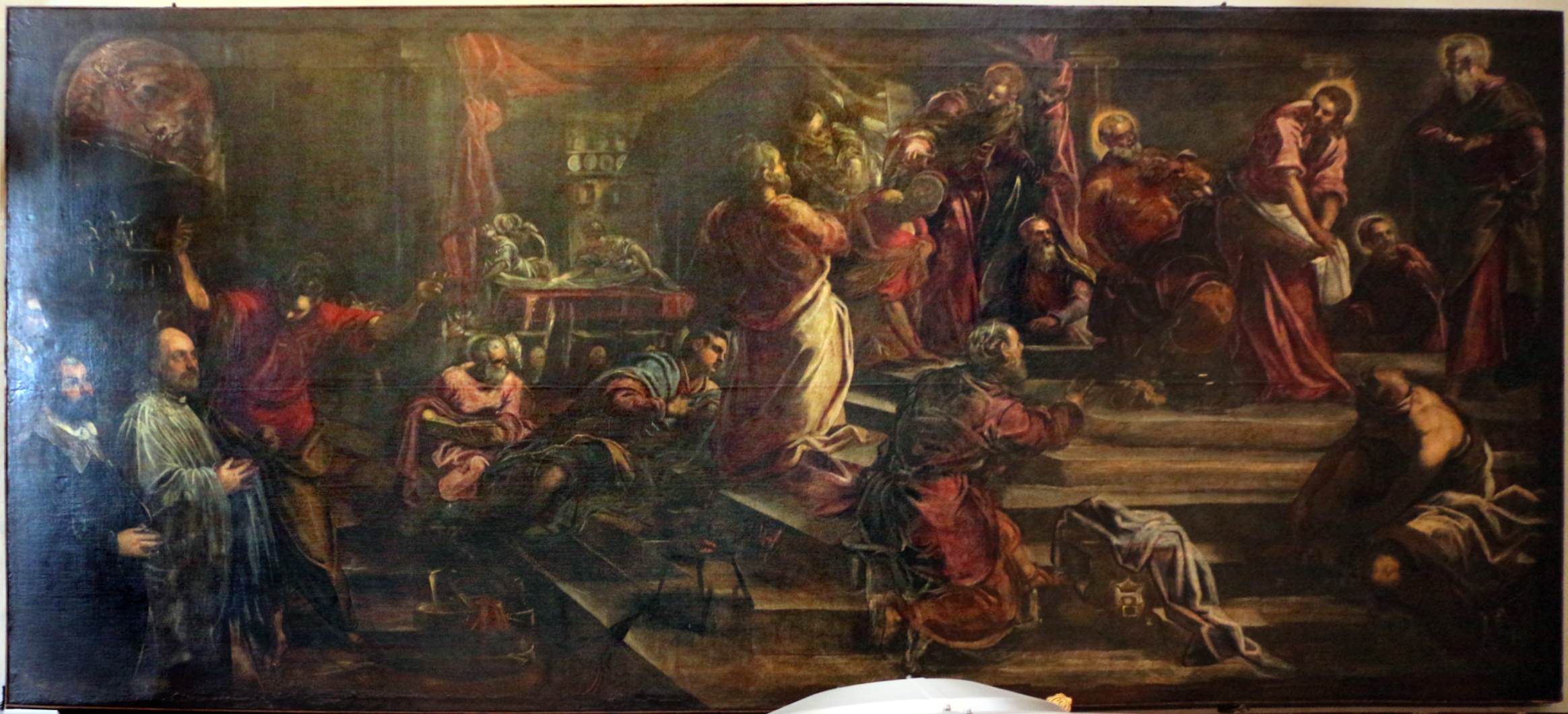
San Moisè, Venice, c. 1580, 333 cm (10.9 ft) x 230.5 cm (90.7 in)

It is now considered that the version in the Shipley is the original painting from St. Marcuola. It was moved from the church by 1648, and next heard of when it was put up for auction on 2 June 1814 at Phillips in London by Alexis Delahante, a French dealer and entrepreneur who was returning to live in Paris. As lot 43 it was sold to H. Baring Esq., of Devonshire Place, London for £32.12.0 and was sold by him the next day to Sir Matthew White Ridley of Blagdon, Northumberland for £43.1.0. The painting was subsequently given to the Church, now Cathedral, of St Nicholas, Newcastle upon Tyne, where it was hung in July 1818. Following its authentication in 1976 by Rodolfo Palluchini, an expert in Tintoretto's work, it was sent to London for cleaning and restoration, and offered on loan to Tyne and Wear Museums in 1980, when it was hung in the Shipley Art Gallery. In 1982, it was shown in the major exhibition 'The Genius of Venice' at the Royal Academy, London.

The painting was purchased from the Chapter of the Cathedral Church of St. Nicholas, Newcastle, for Tyne and Wear Museums in 1986. Financial assistance was kindly given by the National Art Collections Fund, the National Heritage Memorial Fund, the V&A/MGC Purchase Grant Fund, the Pilgrim Trust and the Sir James Knott Trust.'

Art historian Christopher Lloyd, whose main areas of expertise include the Italian Renaissance, French Impressionism and British Art, describes the Shipley version in his book In Search of a masterpiece: An art lover's guide to Great Britain and Ireland: 'This enormous canvas once adorned the right-hand side of the chancel of the church of S. Marcuola in Venice, where it was balanced on the left by the 'Last Supper'. While the latter remains in the church, this seems to have been removed for some reason, possibly as early as the 17th century. It may have belonged to Sir Joshua Reynolds in the 18th century; in 1814 it was sold in London to Sir Matthew White Ridley, who presented it to the church of St Nicholas in Newcastle upon Tyne four years later. Shipley Art Gallery purchased it in 1987 adding one of the finest Venetian pictures in the country to its collection.'

== Toronto version ==
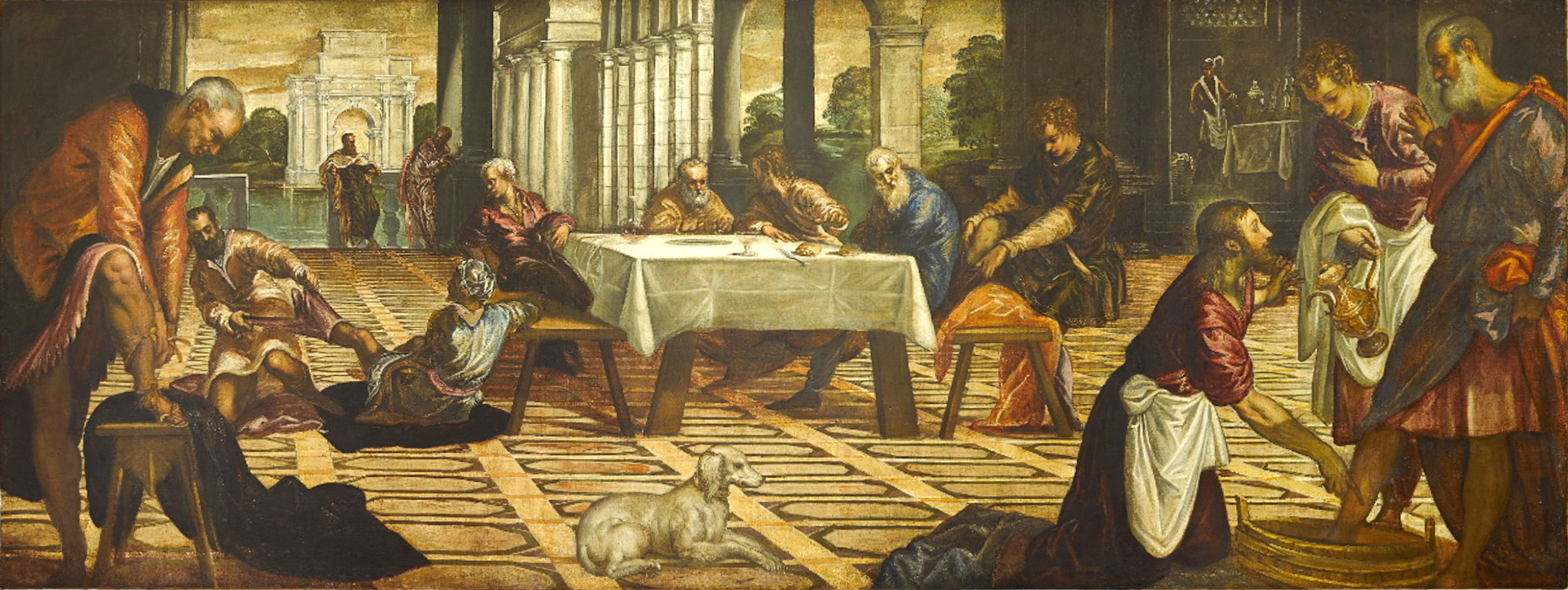
Art Gallery of Ontario, 1545–55, 154.9 x 407.7 cm

As it was common for private collectors to request copies of a noted public work, there is also a version of this painting in Toronto. This version had for many years been part of the collection of the Irish noble family the Barons Farnham. In 1959 it was loaned to the Art Gallery of Ontario in a deal orchestrated by Sir Anthony Blunt. The price for the gallery to permanently own the work was put at $100,000, and a major fundraising project was launched. This price worked out to roughly $10 per inch, and in the hall of the gallery a copy of the painting was displayed covered in one inch white squares. For every ten dollar donation one of the squares was removed. With the participation of schools, church groups, and others the money was raised in less than a year and the painting was purchased for the permanent collection.

== National Gallery ==
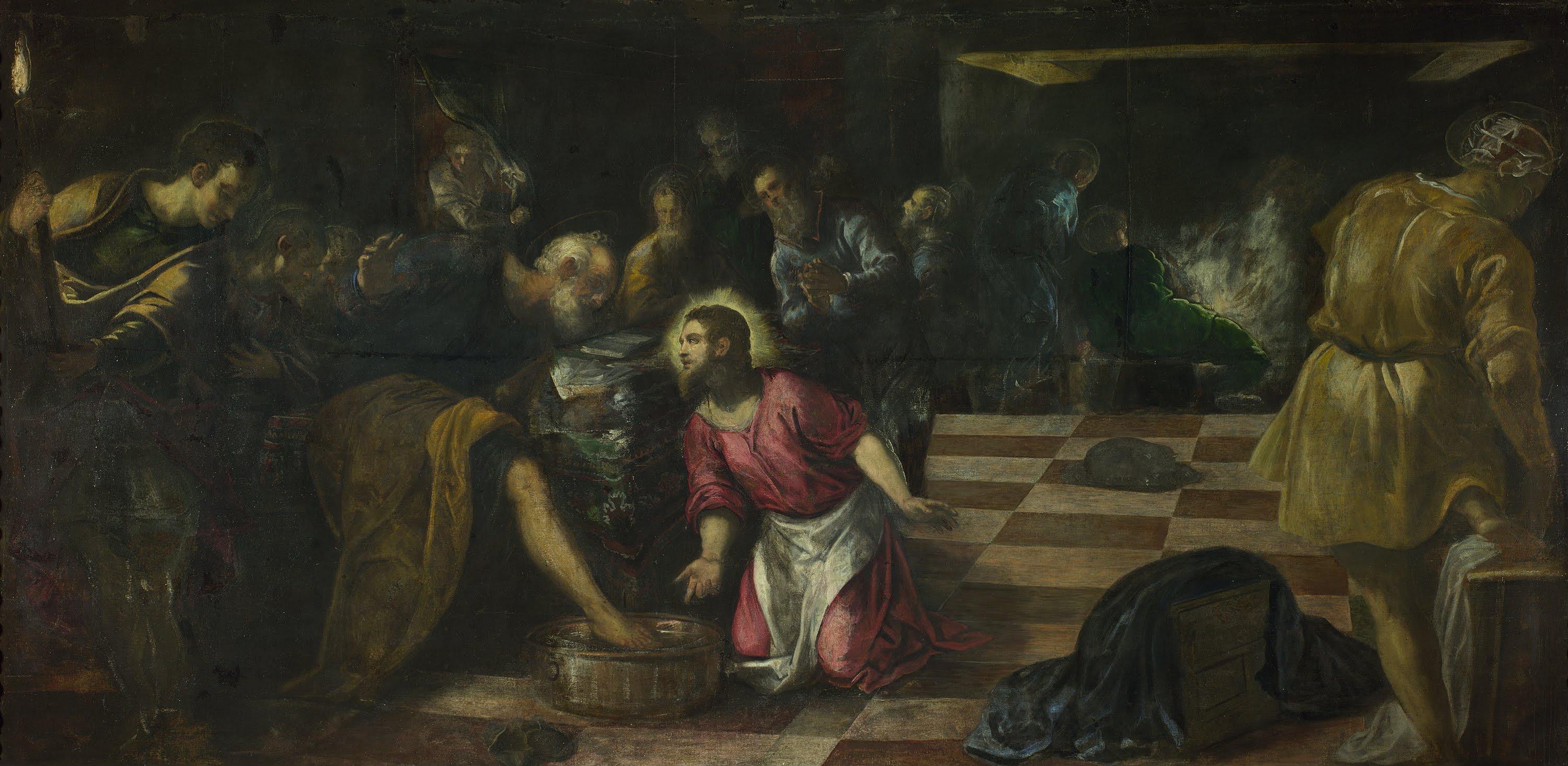
National Gallery, c. 1575–1580

A later, and very different, depiction of the scene is part of the collection of the National Gallery in London. It dates from c. 1575–1580 and was commissioned for the church of San Trovaso. It was also paired with a painting of the Last Supper. It is a far more intimate image than the San Marcuola version set in a much smaller room. Christ is at the centre of the painting, again washing St. Peter's feet as the other disciples gather round.

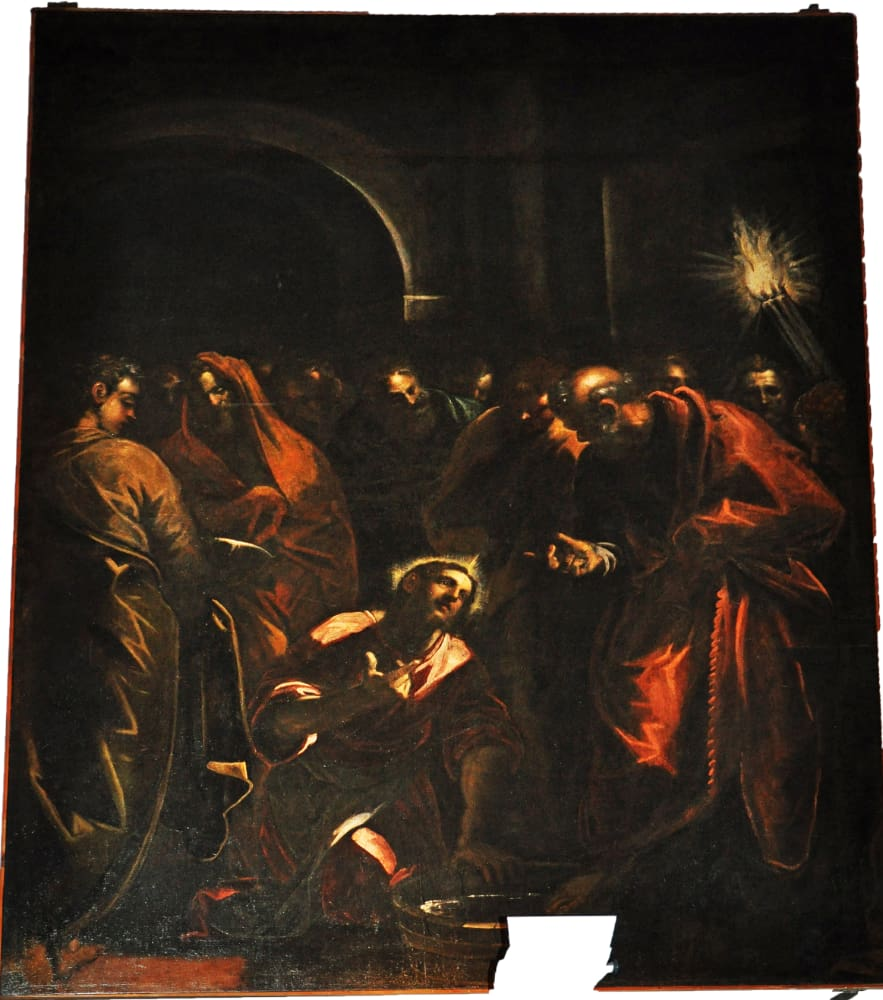
Santo Stefano, Venice

=== Painting materials ===
The painting underwent a thorough cleaning and restoration in the National Gallery shortly before 1979. The scientists of the Gallery also investigated the technical aspects of the painting and the painting materials used by Tintoretto. Main pigments in this painting are ultramarine, red lakes (kermes, madder and lac), malachite and azurite. Tintoretto also used the rare arsenic sulfide pigments realgar and orpiment. An illustrated pigment analysis can be found at ColourLex.

It remained at San Trovaso until purchased by a British collector sometime around 1797. It eventually came into the possession of the Dukes of Hamilton where it was displayed at Hamilton Palace. In 1882 they sold a large portion of their collection, and the Tintoretto was purchased by the National Gallery.

== Santo Stefano and San Moisè ==
Two depictions of the scene by Tintoretto remain in Venice at the original churches for which they were commissioned. Both are from later in Tintoretto's career. One is at the church of Santo Stefano, the other at San Moisè.
