= Palazzo Correr Contarini Zorzi =

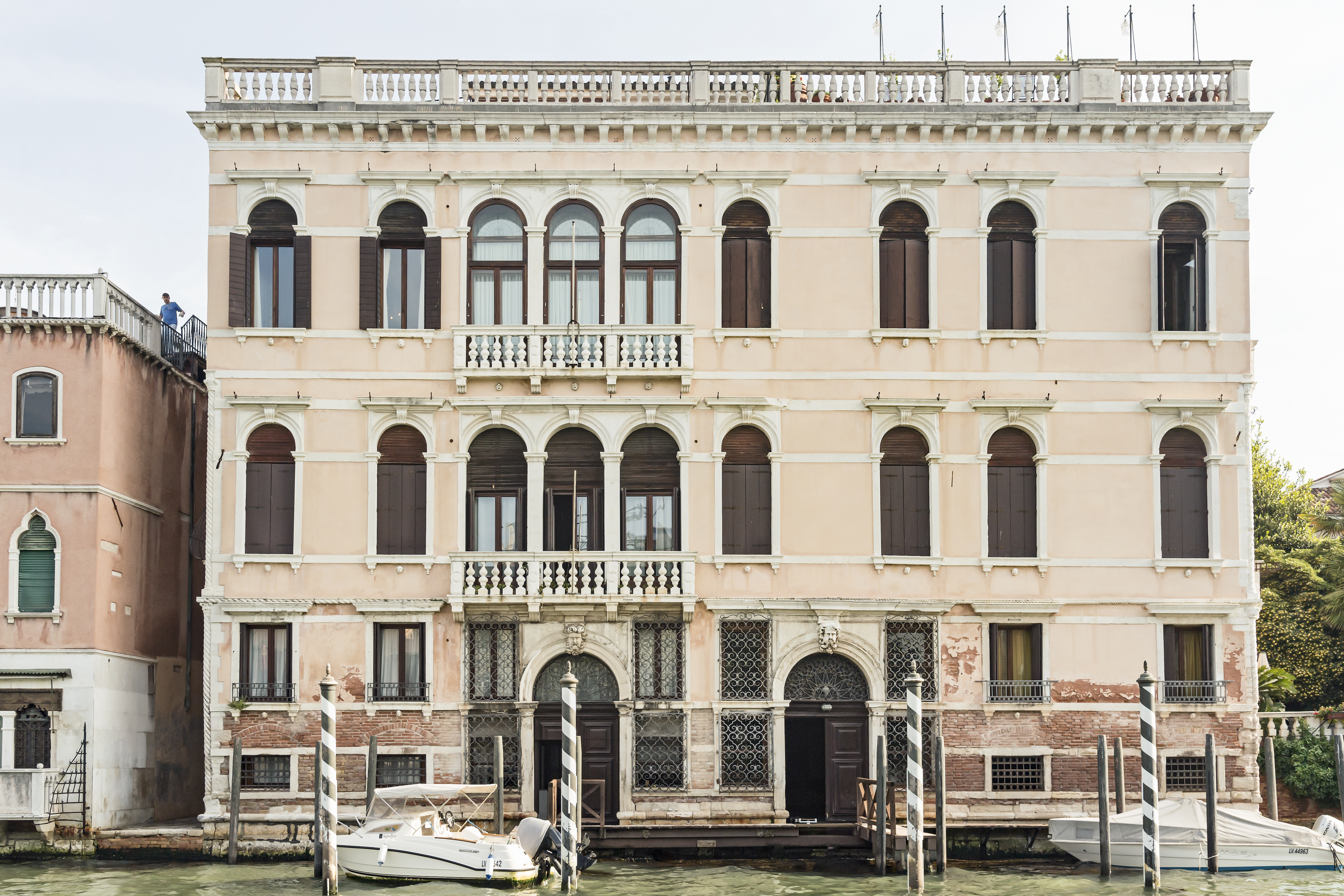
- Palazzo Correr Contarini Zorzi
- Interactive map of the Palazzo Correr Contarini Zorzi area

General information
- Type: Residential
- Architectural style: Renaissance
- Location: Cannaregio district, Venice, Italy
- Coordinates: 45°26′33.77″N 12°19′38.06″E
- Construction stopped: 17th century

Technical details
- Floor count: 4 levels

Palazzo Correr Contarini Zorzi is a Renaissance palace in Venice, Italy, overlooking the Grand Canal and locating in the Cannaregio district between Palazzo Querini Papozze and Palazzo Gritti. The palazzo is also known as Ca' dei Cuori, a family whose wrought iron coats of arms is present on the façade.

== History ==
Built in 1678 on the place where there was an ancient Gothic palace, of which only the corner columns survive, the Palazzo Correr Contarini Zorzi was a residence for many noble Venetian families. The building was initially commissioned by the Correr family, then it passed to the Soranzo, Zorzi, and Contarini families. In this palace lived Antonio Correr, known for being one of the few patricians who refused to wear a wig, then considered to be a status symbol of the noble classes. In the 20th century, the palace was owned by the de Mombell family; they added the terrace that concludes the façade.

The building was recently renovated.

== Architecture ==
The palace offers an impressive 17th-century façade with two imposing monumental water portals, decorated by bow-shaped heads. The portals have main openings surrounded by quadrangular windows; their position symmetrical to that of the windows of the upper floors.

There are two noble floors of equal importance and of the same design. The floors are decorated with triforas with small balconies shifted to the left and flanked by pairs of single-light windows on the left and (double) on the right. The horizontal bands of Istrian stone underline the symmetry and harmony of all the elements. The facade terminates with a white balustrade, which delimits an extensive roof terrace and is supported by a dentiled cornice. There are neoclassical frescoes inside the palazzo.

== Gallery ==
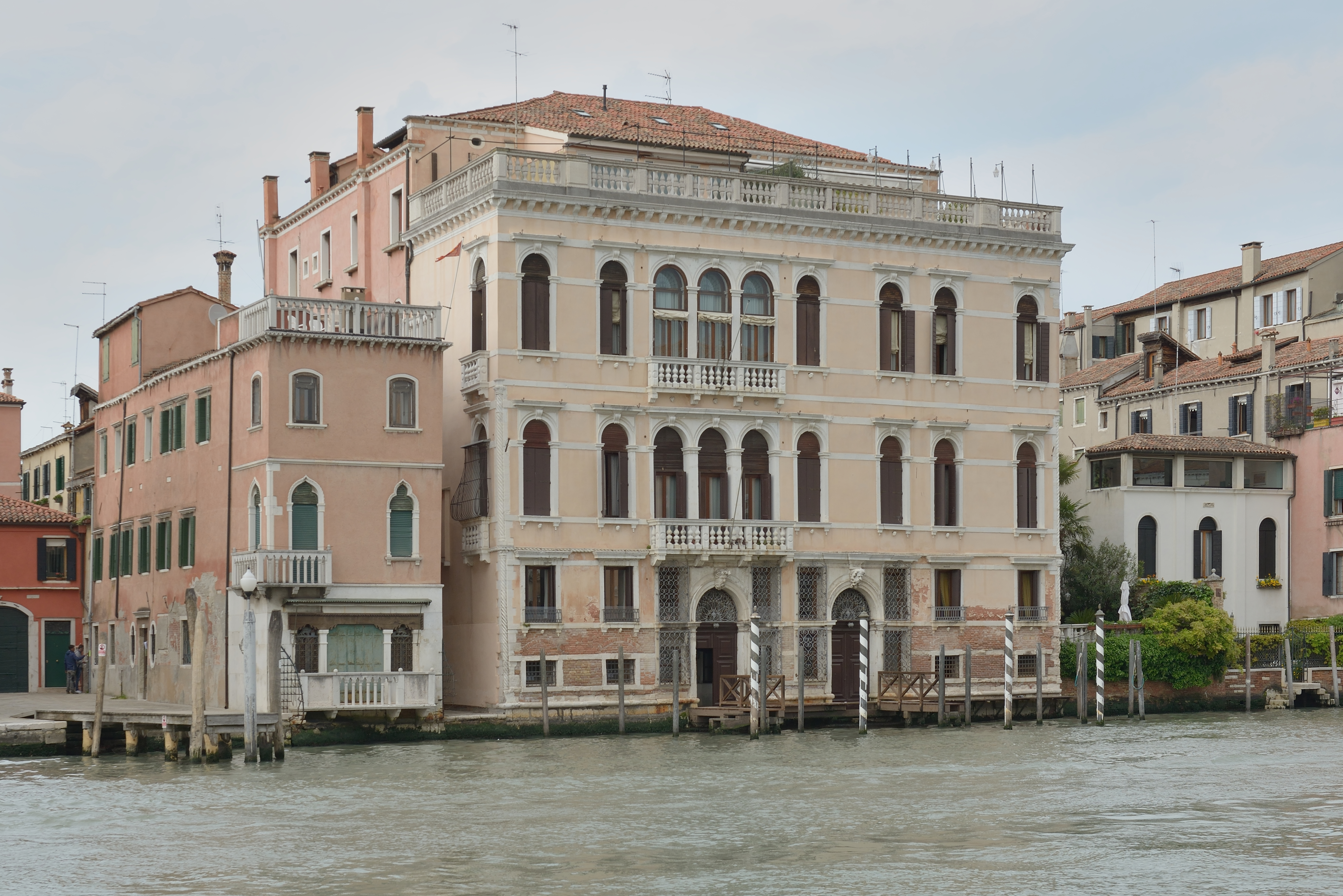
View from Grand Canal

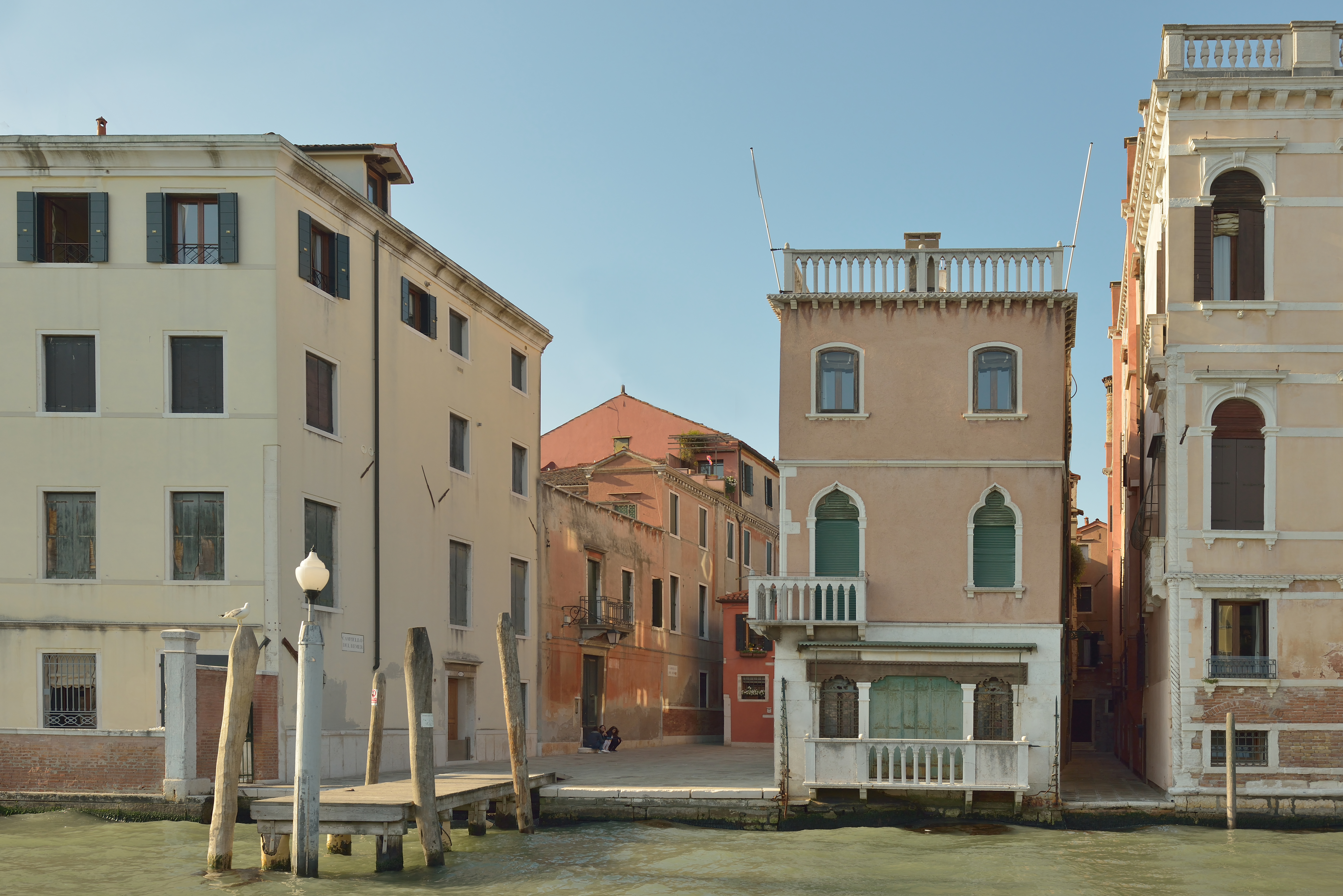
Neighboring building

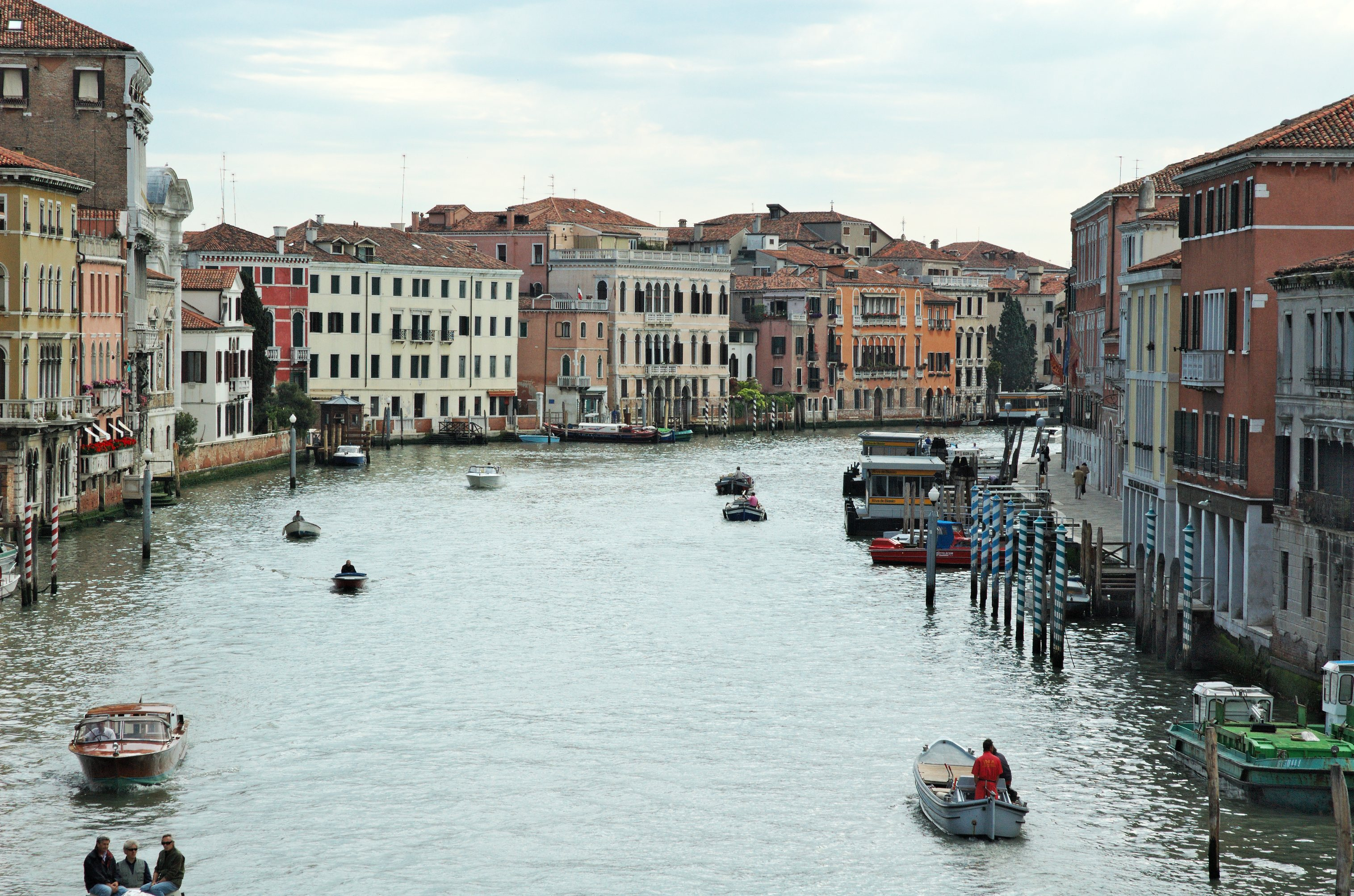
Panoramic view of Grand Canal
