= Hotel Danieli =

Hotel in Venice, Italy

Coordinates: 45.4338°N 12.3421°E

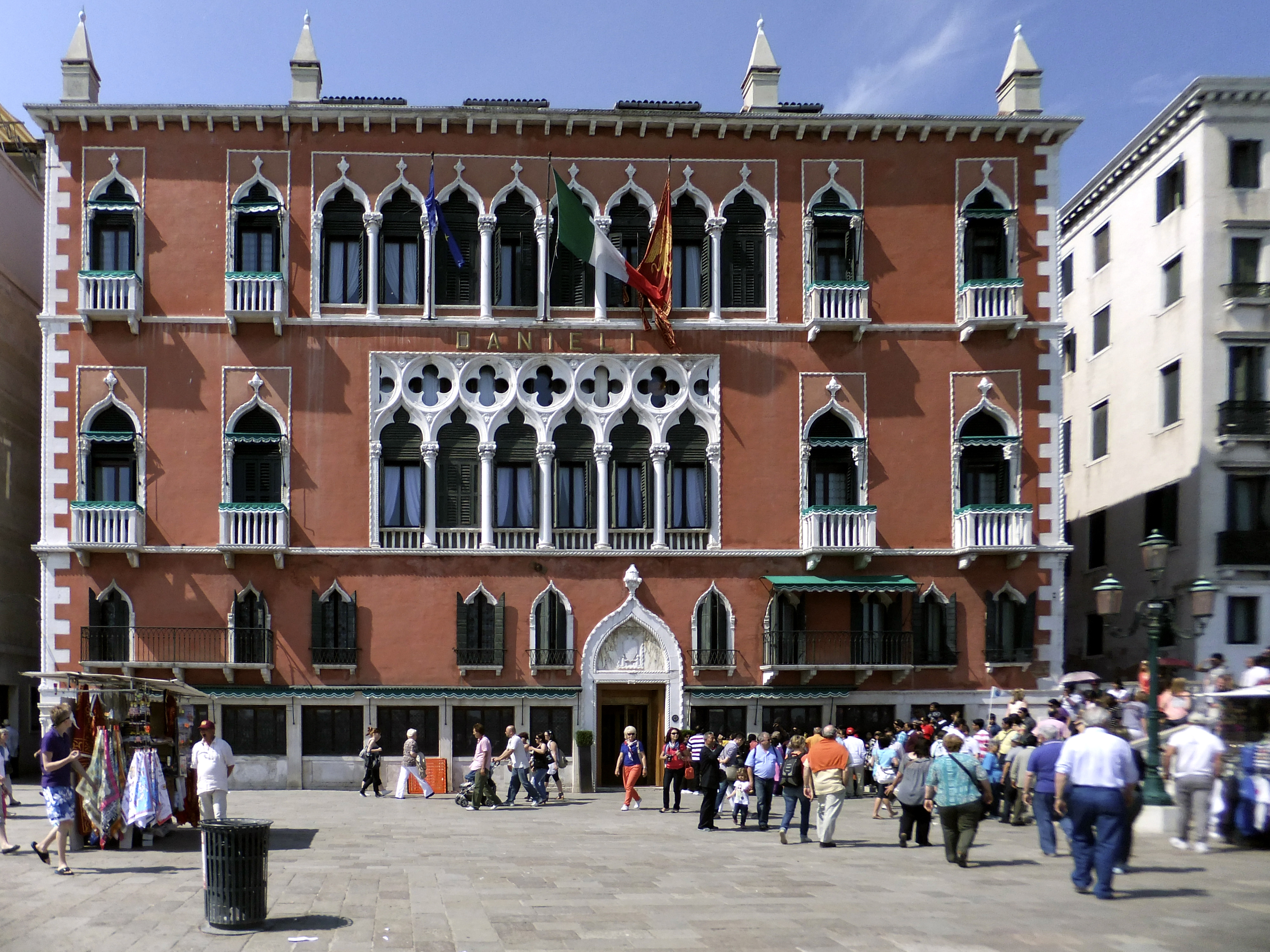
Central Palazzo Dandolo wing of Hotel Danieli

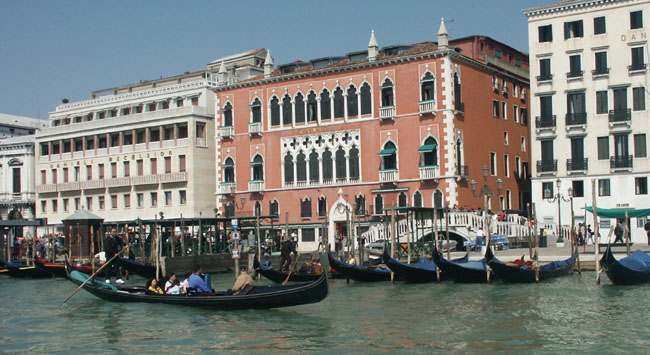
All three wings of Hotel Danieli, viewed from Saint Mark's Basin

The Danieli, Venezia, A Four Seasons Hotel (formerly the Hotel Danieli) is a palatial five-star hotel in Venice, Italy. The central wing of the hotel was built as the Palazzo Dandolo at the end of the 14th century, by one of the Dandolo families. CNN cites it as one of the top five "lavish hotels" in the city.

== Location ==
The hotel's main building is the Palazzo Dandolo, close to St. Mark's Square, with a rear facade on the Riva degli Schiavoni's quayside promenade overlooking the Saint Mark's Basin. It adjoins a number of buildings dated to the 14th and 15th century.

== History ==
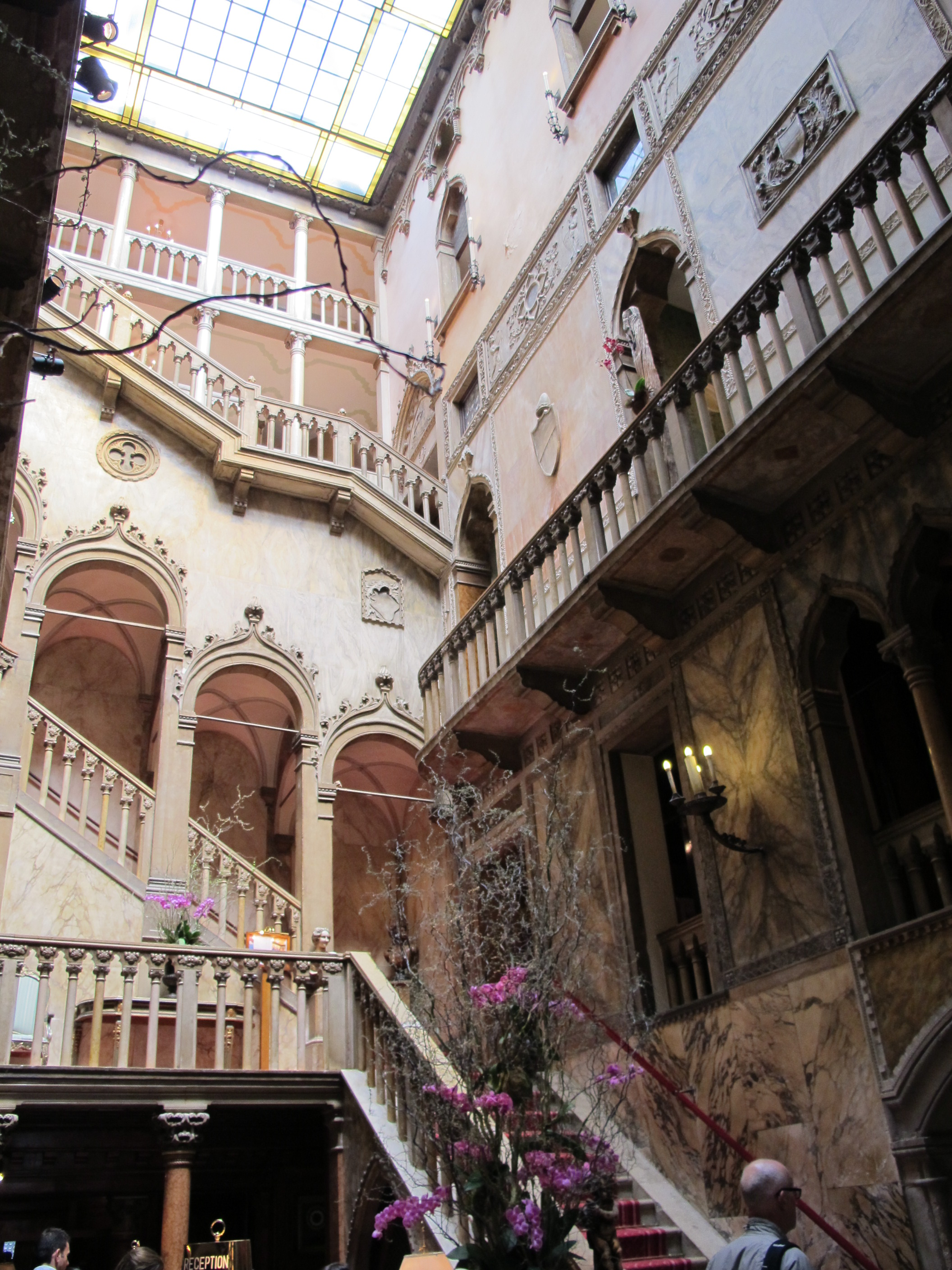
Staircase of the palace

The structure was built at the end of the 14th century by the Dandolos, a noble Venetian family. In the 16th century the building was divided into three sections for different members of the family. The richly embellished building, which gives the appearance of a single unit from the exterior, was then the venue of social gatherings and lavish parties.

In the 17th century, ownership was with the Mocenigo and the Bernardo families who continued to hold grand social events. At the wedding celebration of Giustiniana Mocenigo with Lorenzo Giustinian in 1629, Giulio Strozzi's Proserpina Rapita was performed with music by Monteverdi. The two families were still the owners of the building at the fall of the Venetian Republic in 1797. After the building had suffered the effects of the city's decline, the Venetian Giuseppe Dal Niel of Friuli, known as Danieli, rented the first floor of the building from 24 October 1822 for his own use and to house his guests. In 1824, appreciating its potential as a centrally located meeting place, he bought the entire building, lavishly restored it and converted it into a hotel which he appropriately renamed "Danieli".

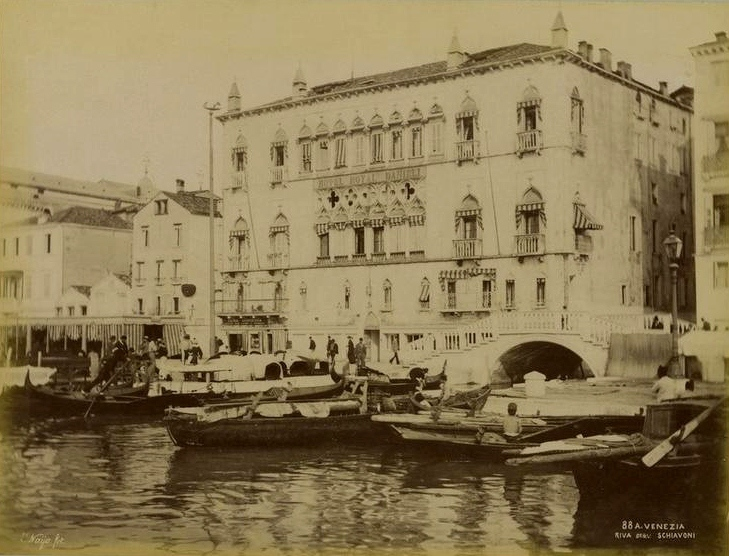
Hotel in the late 19th century

Many notable artists, writers and musicians stayed here, among them Goethe, Wagner, Charles Dickens, Byron, Peggy Guggenheim, Leonard Bernstein, Benjamin Britten, Harrison Ford, and Steven Spielberg. John Ruskin stayed here when he was working on The Stones of Venice. One of the most popular rooms in the hotel is Number 10. It was here that Aurore Dudevant, better known as George Sand, stayed with her lover Alfred de Musset. The biography of George Sand, under the section "Love and Genius", brings out the romantic details of their stay in this room. During this period, the famous restaurant, first known as the Caffè Brigiacco, came into being among the shops which developed on the ground floor. As it was run by two Greek brothers who had a liking for oriental dress, it later became known as the "Caffè Orientale".

In the 19th century, private beach access was a feature of the hotel, while guests could use the services of interpreters who were versed in different European languages. In 1895, when the building's ownership changed hands, it was modernized with extensive electrical fittings, lifts and central heating, transforming it into the luxurious "Hotel Royal Danieli".

By end of the 19th century, a bridge link was established, annexing the hotel to a 19th-century adjoining palace now known as the Casa Nuova which became part of the hotel in 1906. That year, together with four other luxurious hotels in Venice, the Danieli came under the control of Compagnia Italiana Grandi Alberghi (CIGA), owned by Count Giuseppe Volpi. Further changes to the façade were undertaken by the architect Francesco Marsich. Finally, from 1946 to 1948 after the buildings between the Palazzo Dandolo and the Palazzo delle Prigioni had been demolished, the hotel was substantially extended. The "Danielino" (Little Daniele), a new building with a marble façade designed by Virgilio Vallot, became the last addition to the hotel.

In 1994, ITT Sheraton purchased a controlling interest in CIGA. The chain had over-expanded across Europe just as a recession hit, and had been seized from its previous owner, the Aga Khan, by its creditors. The hotel Danieli was placed in the ITT Sheraton Luxury Collection. After Sheraton's sale to Starwood in 1998, the chain was renamed The Luxury Collection. Starwood sold the hotel to The Statuto Group in 2005 for 177 million EUR, but retained management of the property. The hotel left The Luxury Collection on 5 January 2023, and underwent an extensive renovation. On July 30, 2026, it officially opened as Danieli, Venezia, A Four Seasons Hotel, managed by Four Seasons Hotels. It reopened with 120 rooms and suites in the Palazzo Dandolo and Casa Nuova buildings, with a further 48 rooms in the Palazzo Danieli Excelsior building scheduled to reopen in 2027.

== In media ==
In 2010, extensive footage was shot at the hotel for The Tourist, starring Johnny Depp and Angelina Jolie. The suite which appeared in the film was once lived in by the likes of Proust and Balzac; something mentioned in the film. In one scene, Depp clambered across the roof tiles of the hotel in his pajamas.

== Architecture and fittings ==
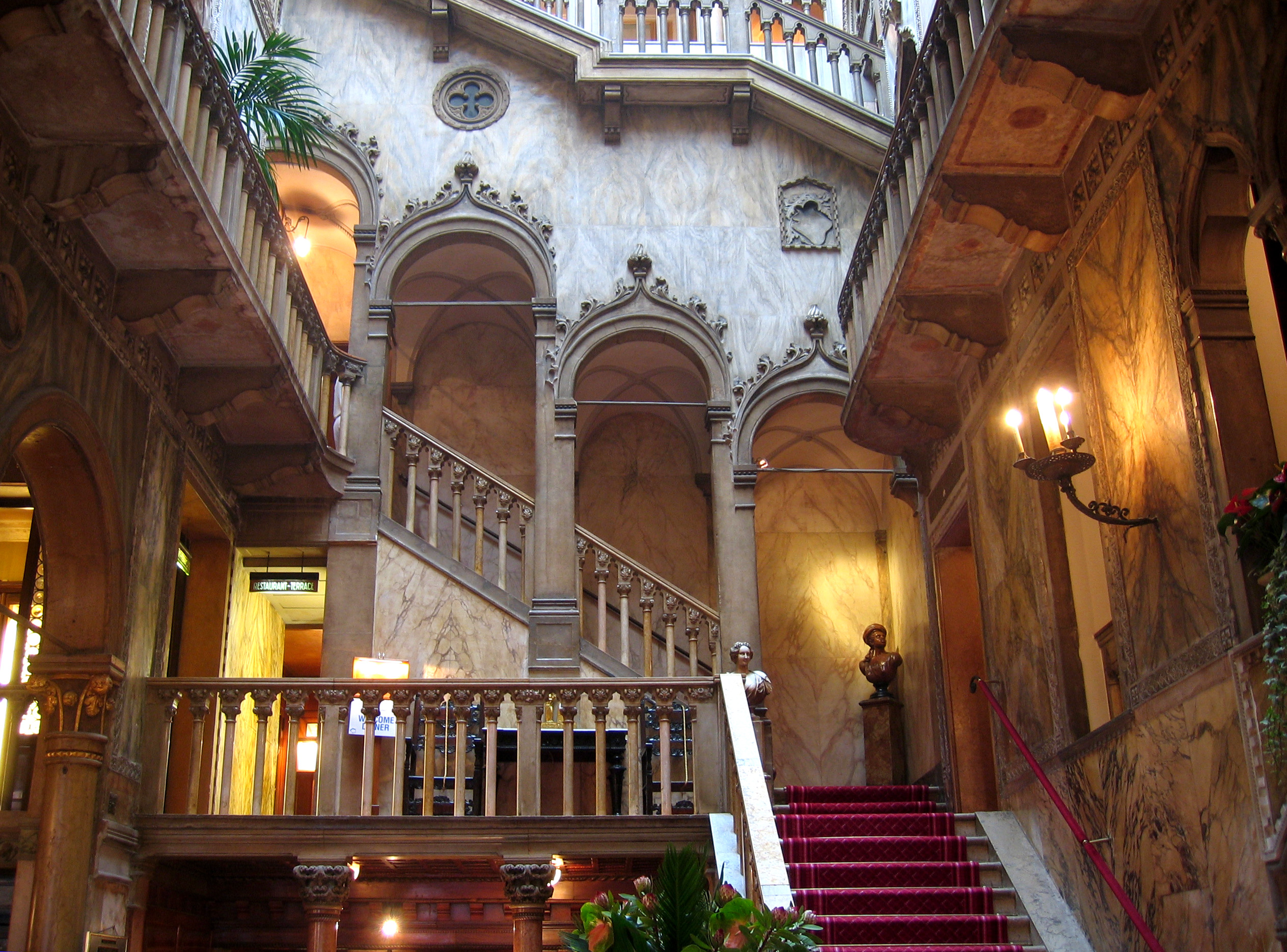
Staircase

The 14th-century building which has been a hotel since 1822 now has a pink façade with marble sills, white turrets and balconies with pointed arches. The main architectural feature is the four-storied courtyard which is covered with arches in Venetian Gothic style and provides for natural sunlight. The foyer leads to the open staircases with balustrades up to the furnished rooms and suites. While an elevator is available, the stairway is painted gold. The hotel's 204 rooms and suites are spread through a central building with three wings. There are rooms facing the lagoon in the original wing of the hotel and large rooms in the 19th-century palazzo. The hotel also boasts a huge fireplace.

The Doge Suite is the most luxurious, with furniture dating to the 18th century and frescos by the 18th-century Venetian artist Jacopo Guarana. The balcony features a Venetian mask shop, while the restaurant is ornamented with an entrance of high arches and chandeliers of Venetian glass. The rooftop terrace restaurant has views of Venice and the lagoon.

== See also ==
- Palazzo Dandolo Paolucci
- Palazzo Gritti Dandolo
