= Francesco Migliori =

Italian painter

Francesco Migliori, also known as Francesco Megliori (c. 1684–1734) was an Italian Baroque painter active mainly in his native Republic of Venice.

== Biography ==
His training is not known, though an adherence to the style of the tenebroso suggests the school of Antonio Molinari. Migliori first appears in the records of the painter's guild starting in 1711. His name appears in 1722 as the author of a series of paintings in the inventory for the gallery of Frederick Augustus I, Elector of Saxony. A first group of paintings depicts mostly biblical subjects: Cain and Abel, the Sacrifice of Isaac, a Joseph Interprets the Dreams, a Lot and His Daughters, and Cimon and Pero (destroyed, but of which we have reproductions). The influence of Bencovich and Piazetta is evident. Later, he sent two mythological scenes with Bacchus and Ariadne and the Rape of Europa (still in Gemäldegalerie of Dresden). Also from this decade appear to be two altarpieces, depicting the Adoration of the Magi and the Transit of St. Joseph, which once had been attributed to Gaspare Diziani.

By 1718 he completed the altarpiece of the Assumption for the altar of the Blessed Assumption School in San Stae. About this time, he likely completed the altarpiece of the Crucifixion with Saints Lawrence, Lucia, and Rocco for the parish church of San Martino a Sambughè, in Treviso. In 1727–28 he completed the painted decoration of the organ doors of San Moise with a St. Cecilia and an Adoration of the Golden Calf. Another artist active in the decoration of the choir was Francesco Pittoni (the uncle of Giambattista). He also completed an altarpiece of St. Anthony Resuscitates Father Martino for a chapel at the right in the church. He painted a small canvas depicting Christ and the Samaritan and a Christ and Mary Magdalene now at Rovigo.

By 1728, he began to perform extensive works in the decoration of San Marcuola. Beginning in April 1728, he is documented to have painted a series of canvases about the titular saints of Ermagora and Fortunato for the church of San Marcuola, recently renovated by Giorgio Massari. By 1729–1731, he competed paintings for the sacristy of this church, depicting Fortunato Attends Ermagora's Martyrdom and the Baptism conferred by Ermagora to the martyred Saints Euphemia, Dorotea, Tecla, and Erasma, plus a ceiling canvas depicting the Glory of Saints Ermagora and Fortunato (1735).

He also painted a second subject for presbytery with the Fall of Manna (August 1735). He likely painted a Virgin of Sorrows and St. Francis of Paola now on the sides of the pulpit. He apparently painted the main altarpiece of the Assumption but that appears now replaced by a copy. He may have played a role in a cycle of the Passion of Christ for the adjacent oratory, but the one remaining painting is attributed to Nicolò Bambini.

== Sources ==
- Entry on Francesco Migliori by M. Biffis in Treccani Encyclopedia
