= Carlo Ridolfi =

Italian art biographer and painter (1594–1658)

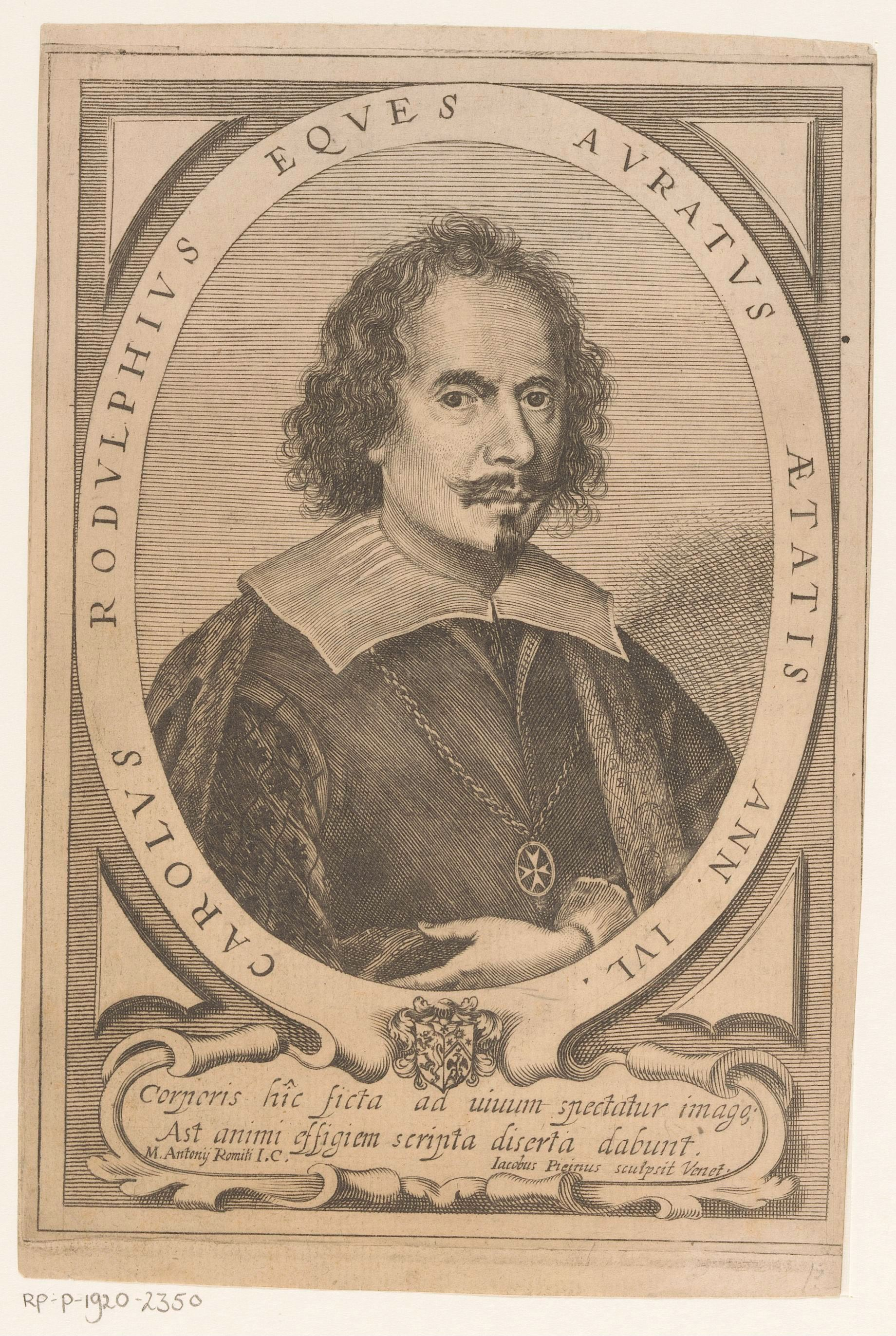
- Born: Carlo Sartor; 1 April 1594; Lonigo, Republic of Venice
- Died: 5 September 1658; Florence, Republic of Venice
- Resting place: San Vidal, Venice
- Occupations: Painter, writer, art historian, engraver

Carlo Ridolfi (1594–1658) was an Italian art biographer and painter of the Baroque period.

== Biography ==
Ridolfi was born in Lonigo near Vicenza.

He was a pupil of the painter Antonio Vassilacchi (Aliense). He painted a Visitation for the Ognissanti and an Adoration of the Magi for San Giovanni Elemosinario in Venice. He copied Tintoretto's Christ Washing the Disciples' Feet in San Marcuola, before it came to the collection of King Charles I of England. Ridolfi's copy still remains in San Marcuola. He was certainly best known, in his own day and ever since, as an author on art. Carlo Ridolfi was also an important collector of drawings, such as Giorgio Vasari. Many of these drawings are conserved in the Christ Church Library (Oxford).

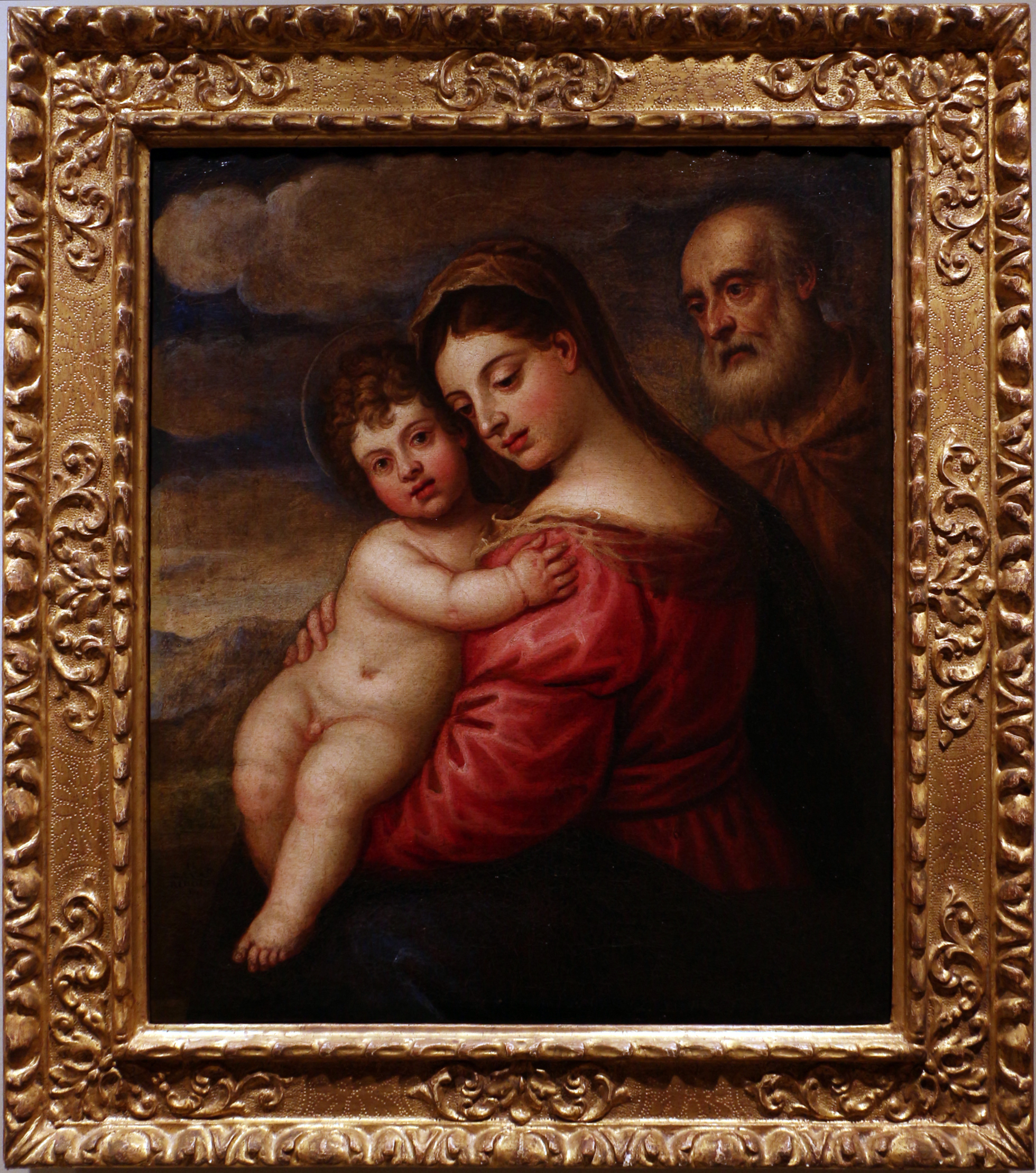
Carlo Ridolfi, Sacra Famiglia

Ridolfi wrote a biography of the Venetian painters in 1648 titled Le maraviglie dell'Arte ovvero, Le vite degli Illustri Pittori Veneti e dello Stato. He also wrote La vita di Giacopo Robusti (a biography of Tintoretto) in 1642. He was awarded the knighthood of the Golden Cross by Pope Innocent X and a chain of gold and a medal of St. Mark by the Republic of Venice, essentially for his books rather than his painting. Subsequent Venetian chroniclers who have quoted Ridolfi include Marco Boschini, Antonio Maria Zanetti, and Luigi Lanzi.

As Vasari's Lives of the Most Excellent Painters, Sculptors, and Architects was weaker on Venetian painters than Florentine ones, Ridolfi remains an important source for Venetian painting between the beginning of the Renaissance and his own day, although his accuracy is often doubted, and many of his numerous attributions, especially to Giorgione, are no longer accepted: according to Michael Hirst, "... the enormous number of paintings attributed to Giorgione by Ridolfi gravely weakens his authority".

One purpose of his work was to supply a corrective to Vasari, and just as Vasari ascribes all progress in art to Florentines, Ridolfi attempts something similar for the Venetian tradition, with its closer connection to Byzantine art. He was well educated in the classics, and his style is much given to rhetorical flourishes, classical comparisons and references to poetry, whilst rather lacking Vasari's talent for telling anecdote. He approached the larger lives in a scholarly fashion, and quoted many documents, often now vanished, that remain invaluable to art historians. His work gives great insight into the way art was seen in his own day, as well as during the lives of his subjects.

He died at Venice in 1658.

== Works ==
- Le maraviglie dell'arte: ovvero Le vite degli illustri pittori Veneti e dello Stato ..., Volume 1, By Carlo Ridolfi, Giuseppe Vedova, Second edition with corrections, Tipografia Cartellier, Padua, 1835. 1648 Edition.
- Vita di Giacopo Robusti (Tintoretto), 1642 (no preview).

== Sources ==
- Farquhar, Maria (1855). Ralph Nicholson Wornum (ed.). Biographical catalogue of the principal Italian painters. London: Woodfall & Kinder. pp. 146–7.
- Land, Norman E. (2004). "Poetry and anecdote in Carlo Ridolfi's Life of Titian". In Patricia Meilman (ed.). The Cambridge Companion to Titian. Cambridge UP. pp. 205–224.
