= Palazzo Memmo Martinengo Mandelli =

Building in Cannaregio, Venice

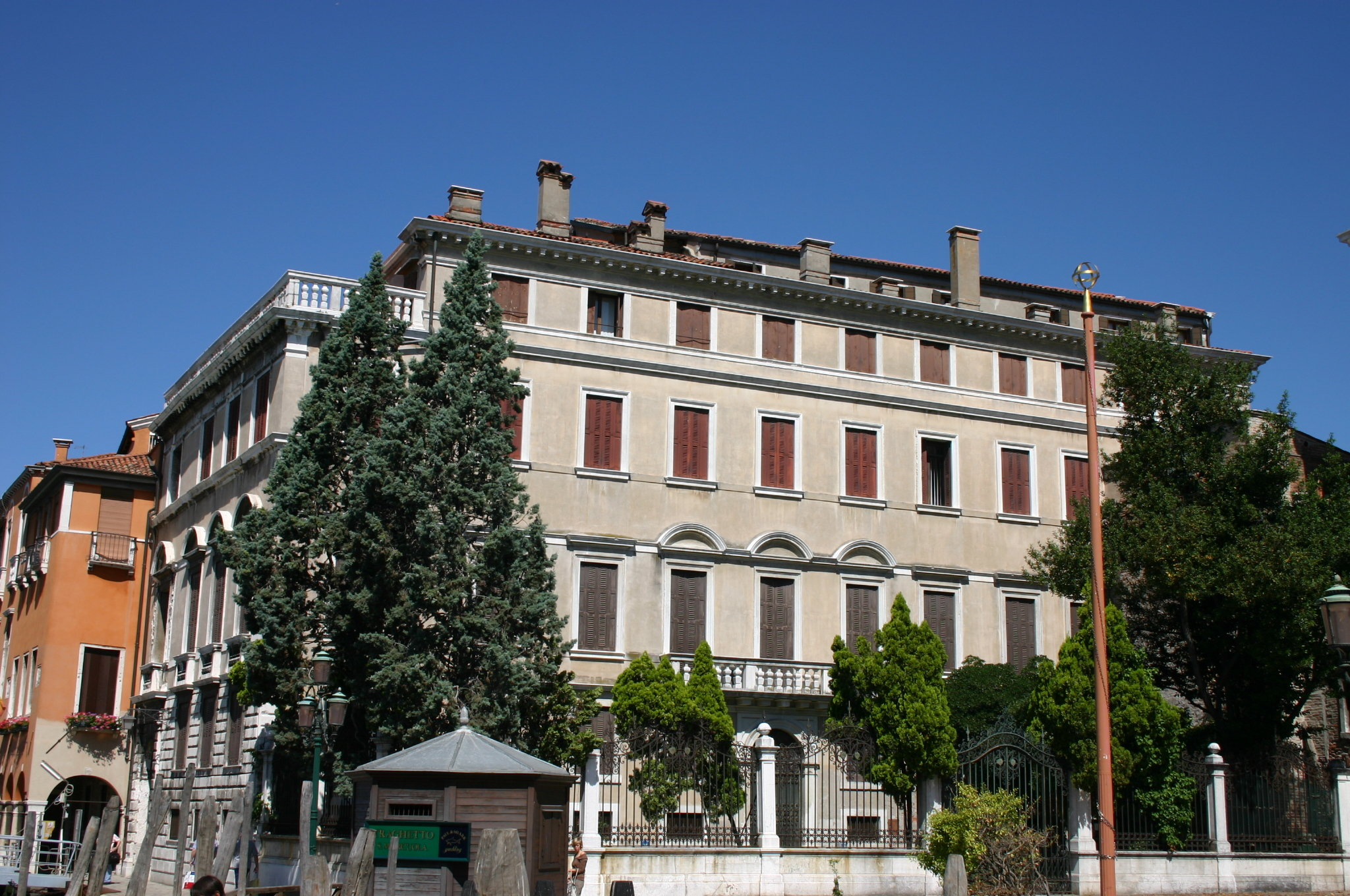
- Side view of the palazzo
- Interactive map of the Palazzo Memmo Martinengo Mandelli area

General information
- Type: Residential
- Architectural style: Neoclassical
- Location: Cannaregio district, Venice, Italy
- Coordinates: 45°26′33.99″N 12°19′41.65″E
- Construction stopped: 18th century

Technical details
- Floor count: 5 levels

Palazzo Memmo Martinengo Mandelli (also known as Ca' Memmo) is a palace in Venice, Italy, located in the Cannaregio district, overlooking the left side of the Grand Canal, between Palazzo Gritti Dandolo and the Church of San Marcuola.

== History ==
The structure was built during the 18th century and substantially renovated during the next one. The palace was the residence of Andrea Memmo (1721–1792), an elected prosecutor in 1775, who is known for his friendship with Giacomo Casanova. The palazzo passed to cav. Luigi Mandelli in 1886. After several structures neighboring the palace on the right had been demolished, the right wing was rebuilt to add a garden. The palazzo has housed several public offices.

== Architecture ==
The asymmetrical neoclassical façade appears to split into levels thanks to the use of frames and bands of Istrian stone that connect windowsills, windows, and lintels. Wider windows are set in the left side of the facade. The ground floor is covered with ashlar. The palace extends in depth and has both a central courtyard and a garden.

== Gallery ==
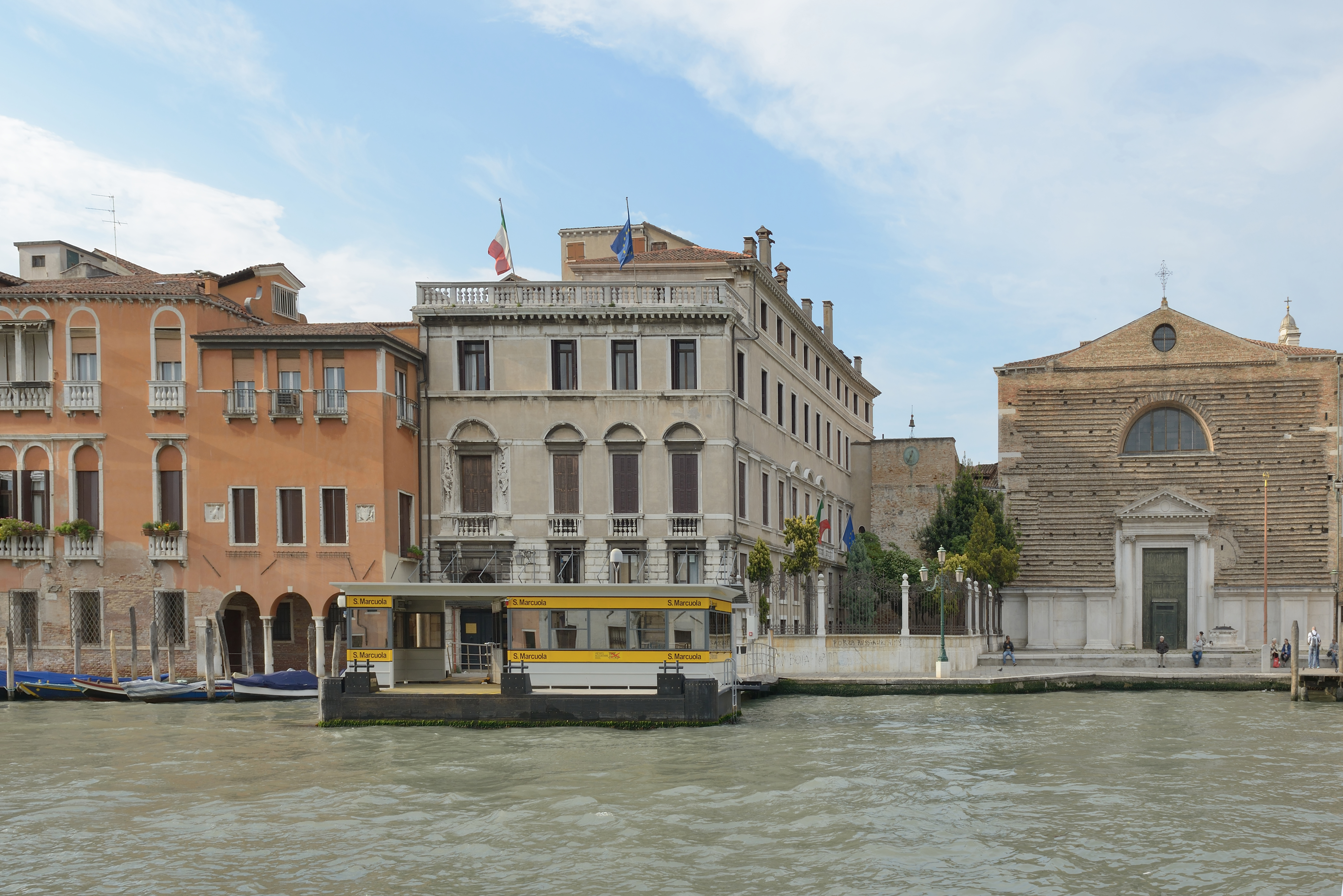
Main facade overlooking the Grand Canal

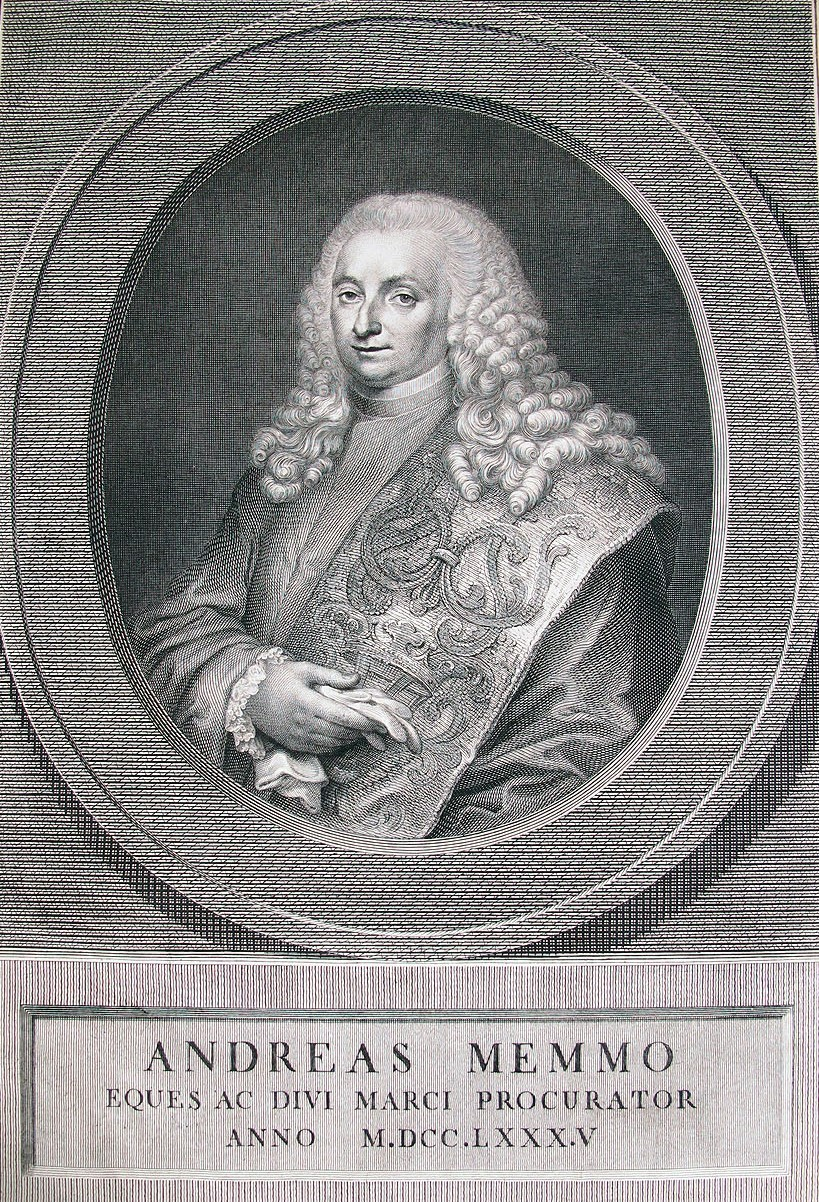
Andrea Memmo
