= San Marcuola =

Church in Venice, Italy

Coordinates: 45°26′34″N 12°19′43″E

San Marcuola Santi Ermagora e Fortunato
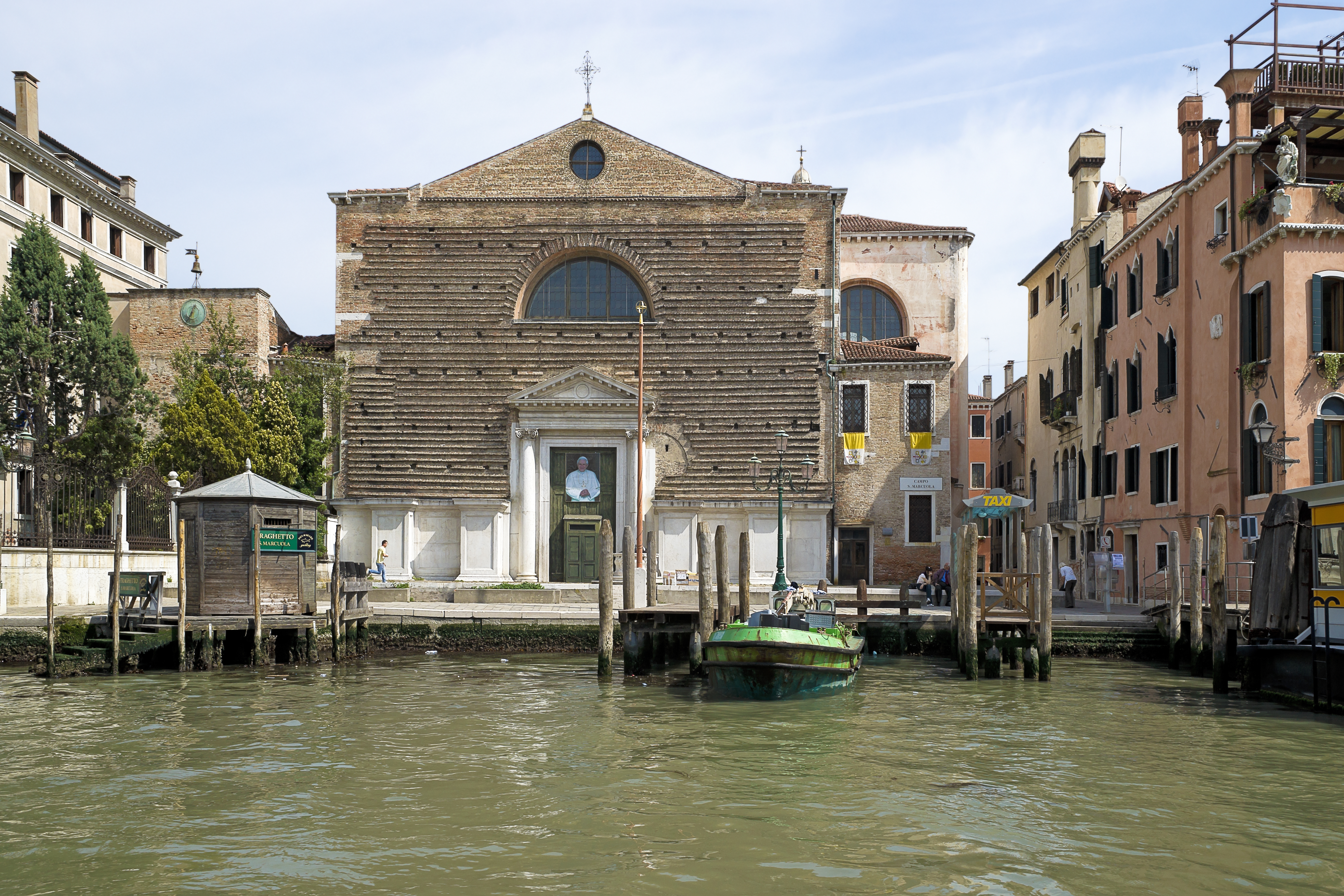
- Facade facing Grand Canal

- Location within Venice Location within Italy

Religion
- Affiliation: Roman Catholic
- Year consecrated: 1779
- Status: Active

Location
- Location: Venice, Italy

Architecture
- Architect: Giorgio Massari
- Type: Church
- Style: Neoclassicism
- Groundbreaking: 13th century, 1730 (reconstruction)
- Completed: 1766 (facade incomplete)

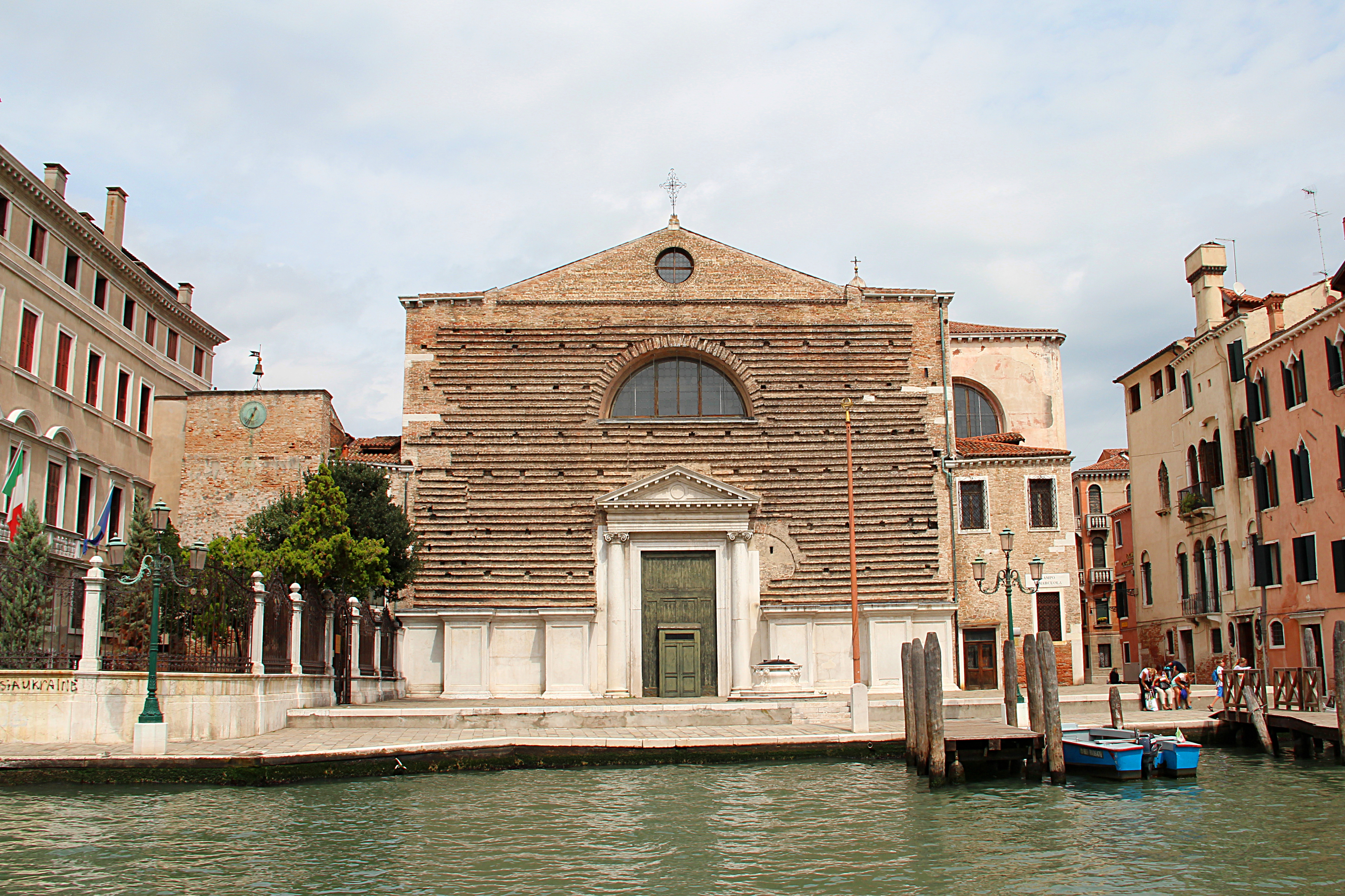
The facade of San Marcuola church seen from the Grand Canal (Venice).

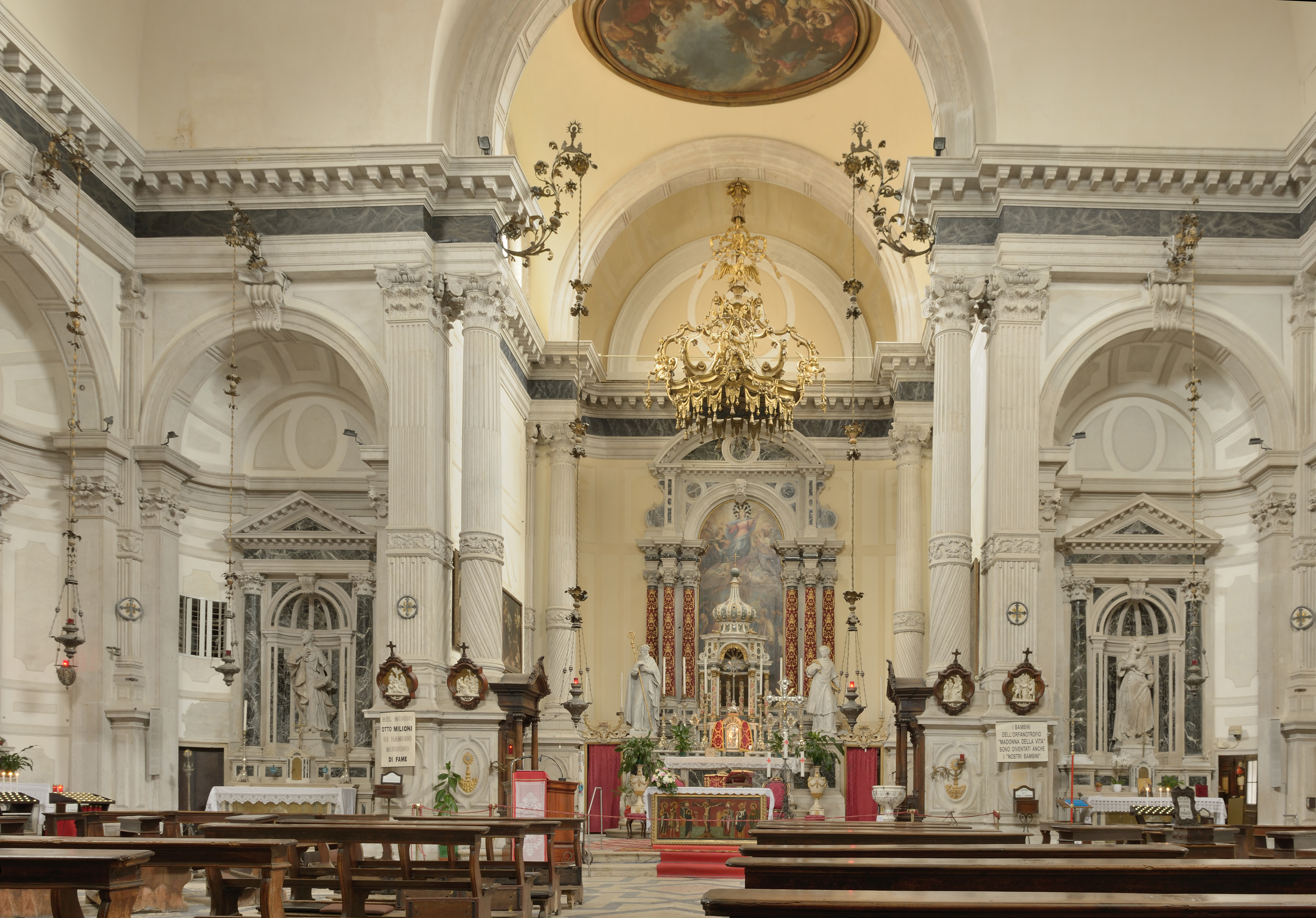
Interior view.

The church of San Marcuola is a religious building facing the Grand Canal and located in the sestiere of Cannaregio in Venice, Italy. It is dedicated to the saints Hermagoras and Fortunatus ("Marcuola" is a Venetian contraction of "Ermacora"). Palazzo Memmo Martinengo Mandelli is a neighboring building.

== History ==
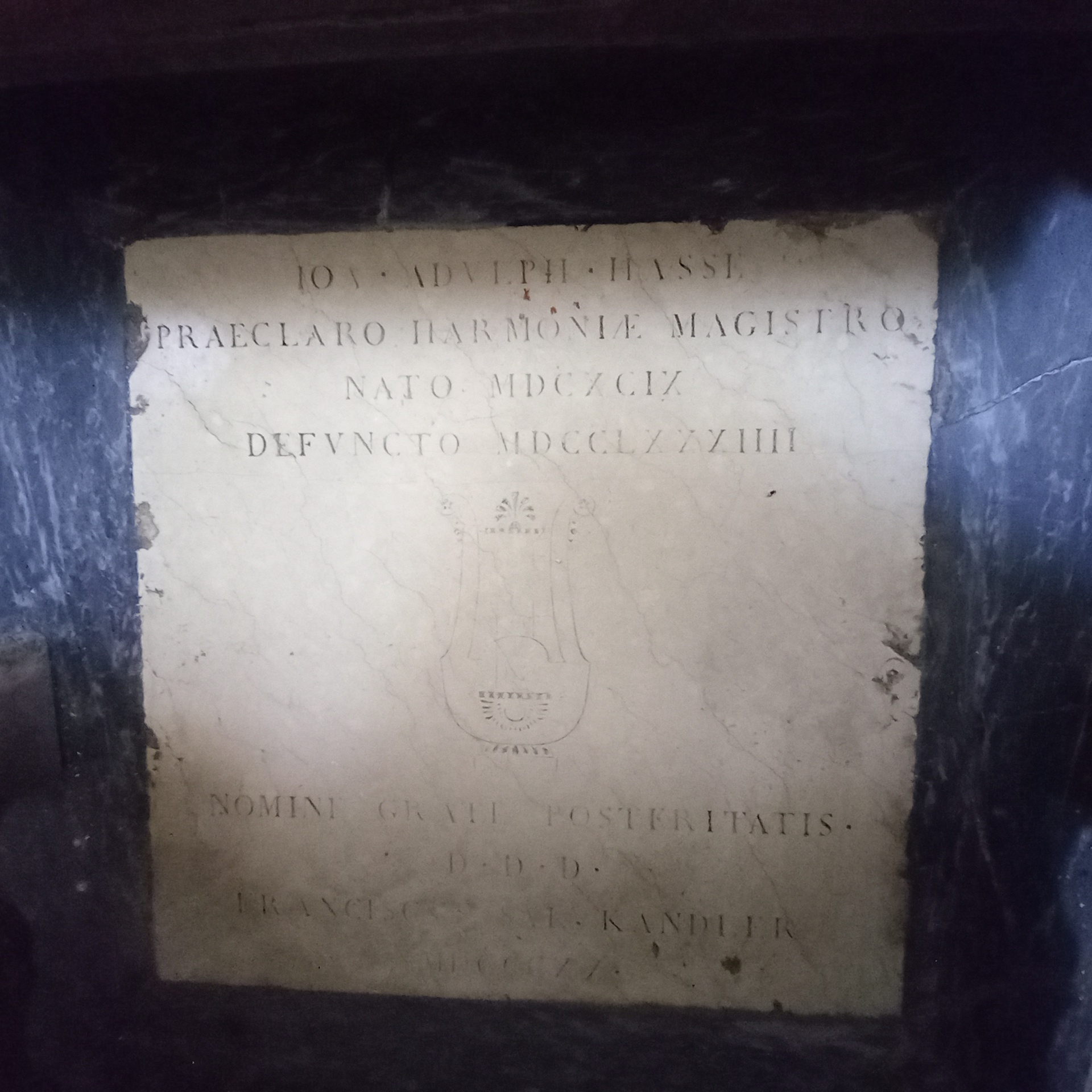
The grave of Johann Adolph Hasse in San Marcuola.

The present church was first erected in the 12th century. Major reconstruction was designed by Antonio Gaspari, and completed in 1730-1736 by Giorgio Massari. The facade was never completed. The church has a large collection of statues by Gaetano Susali, and paintings by Francesco Migliori. It has a Last Supper by Jacopo Tintoretto on the left side of the apse.

For the right side, Tintoretto painted Christ Washing the Disciples' Feet but it is now at either Museo del Prado in Madrid or the Shipley Art Gallery.

Its place at San Marcuola is occupied now by a copy by Carlo Ridolfi.

The graves of 18th century German composer Johann Adolph Hasse and of his wife, the Italian mezzo-soprano Faustina Bordoni, are located in San Marcuola.

The church gives its name to the San Marcuola vaporetto stop on the Grand Canal.

== Sources ==
- Brusegan, Marcello. Le chiese di Venezia. Newton Compton.
- Massari, Antonio (1971). Giorgio Massari architetto veneziano del Settecento, Vicenza. Neri Pozza. pp. 51–54.
