= Palazzo Dandolo Paolucci =

Residence in Venice, Italy

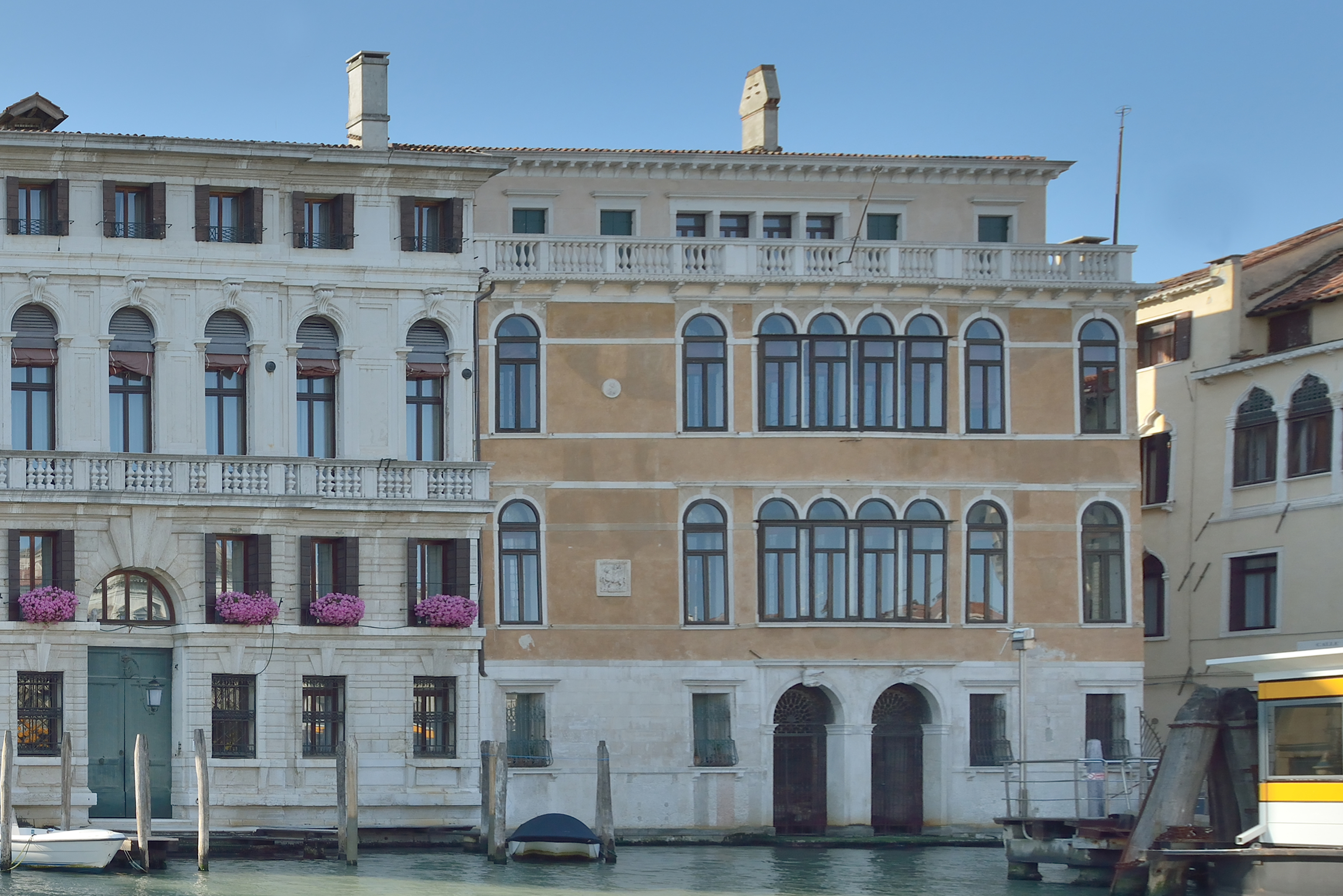
- Palazzo Dandolo Paolucci on the Grand Canal
- Interactive map of the Palazzo Dandolo Paolucci area

General information
- Type: Residential
- Architectural style: Renaissance
- Location: San Polo, Venice, Italy
- Coordinates: 45°26′07.41″N 12°19′39.87″E
- Construction stopped: 17th century

Technical details
- Floor count: 4

Palazzo Dandolo Paolucci is a Renaissance palace in Venice, Italy, located in the San Polo district and overlooking the Grand Canal. The palazzo neighbors Palazzo Dolfin and Palazzo Civran Grimani.

== History ==
The present palace was built in the 17th century on the site of a previous Gothic building of the 14th century. The palace was heavily remodeled in later periods. A large terrace with a balustrade was added on top in 1924. Dandolo is the name of a dogal family. Palazzo Dandolo belonged to the Paolucci family in the 18th century.

== Architecture ==
The palace has four levels with two noble floors in the middle. They are decorated by quadriforas slightly shifted to the right and flanked by pairs of single-light windows. The ground floor has two water portals; this feature testifies to the two-family use of the building. The palazzo has a modern terrace, located on the top floor, above the eaves line.

== Gallery ==
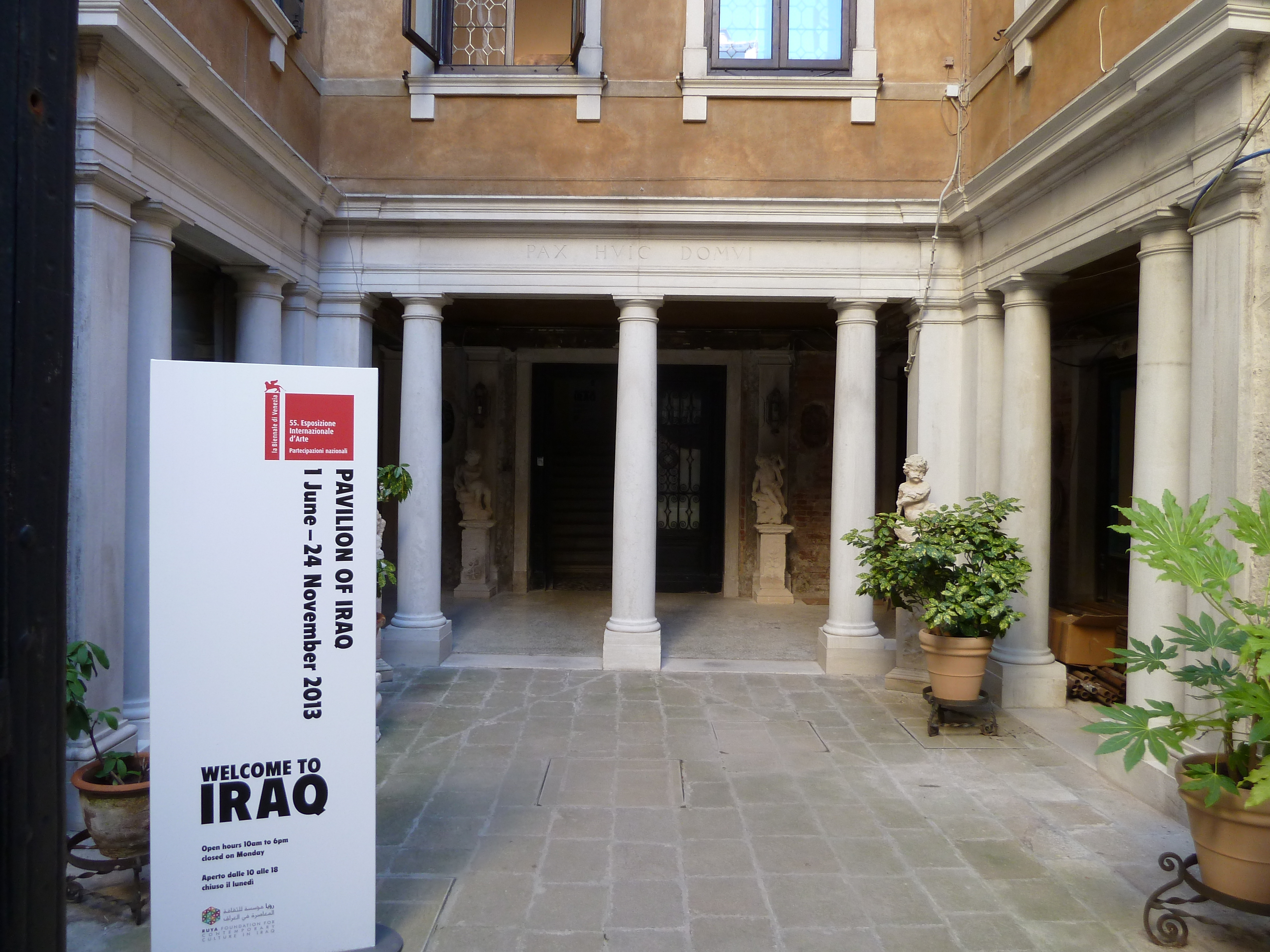
Internal courtyard

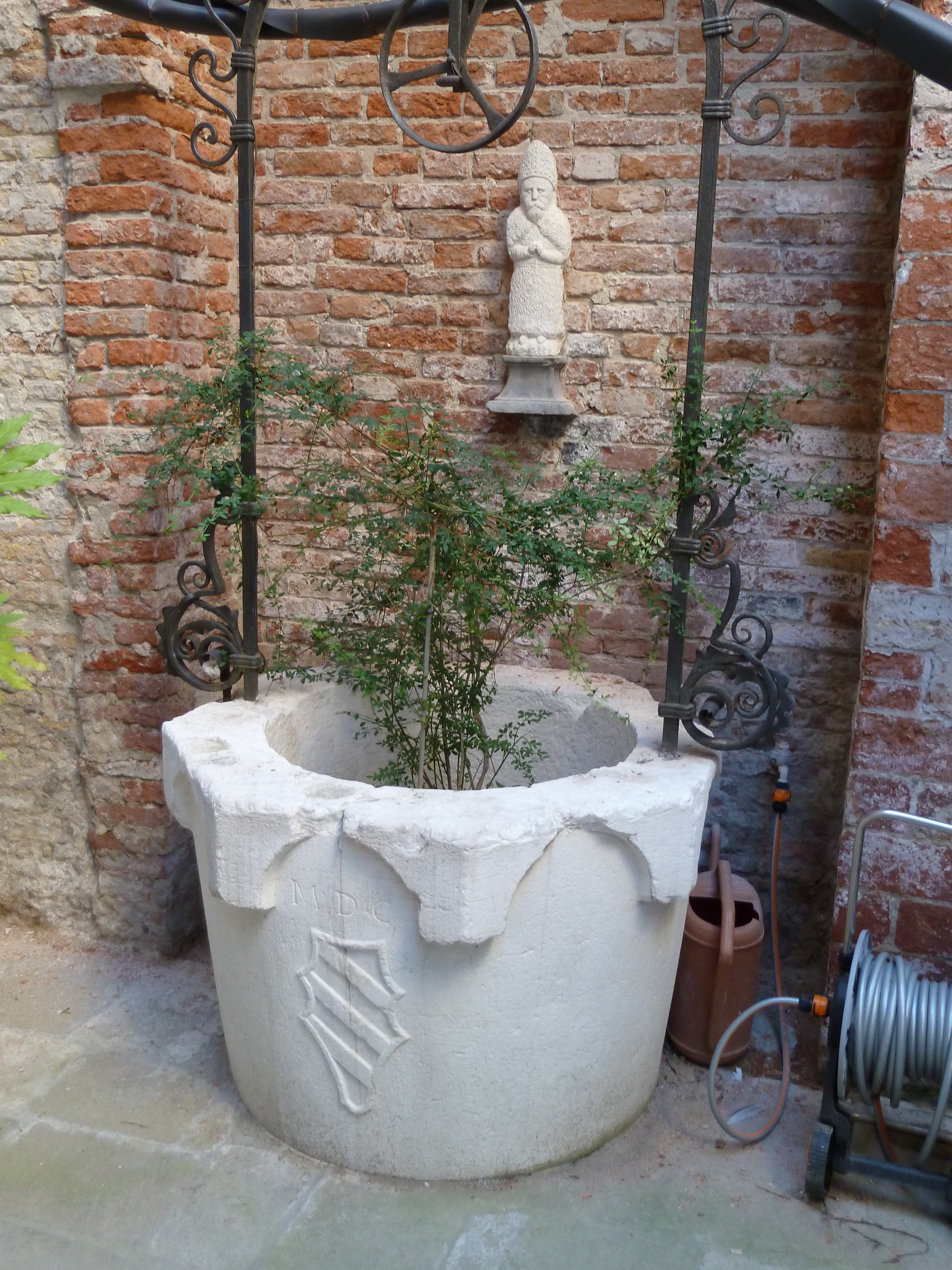
Courtyard old well

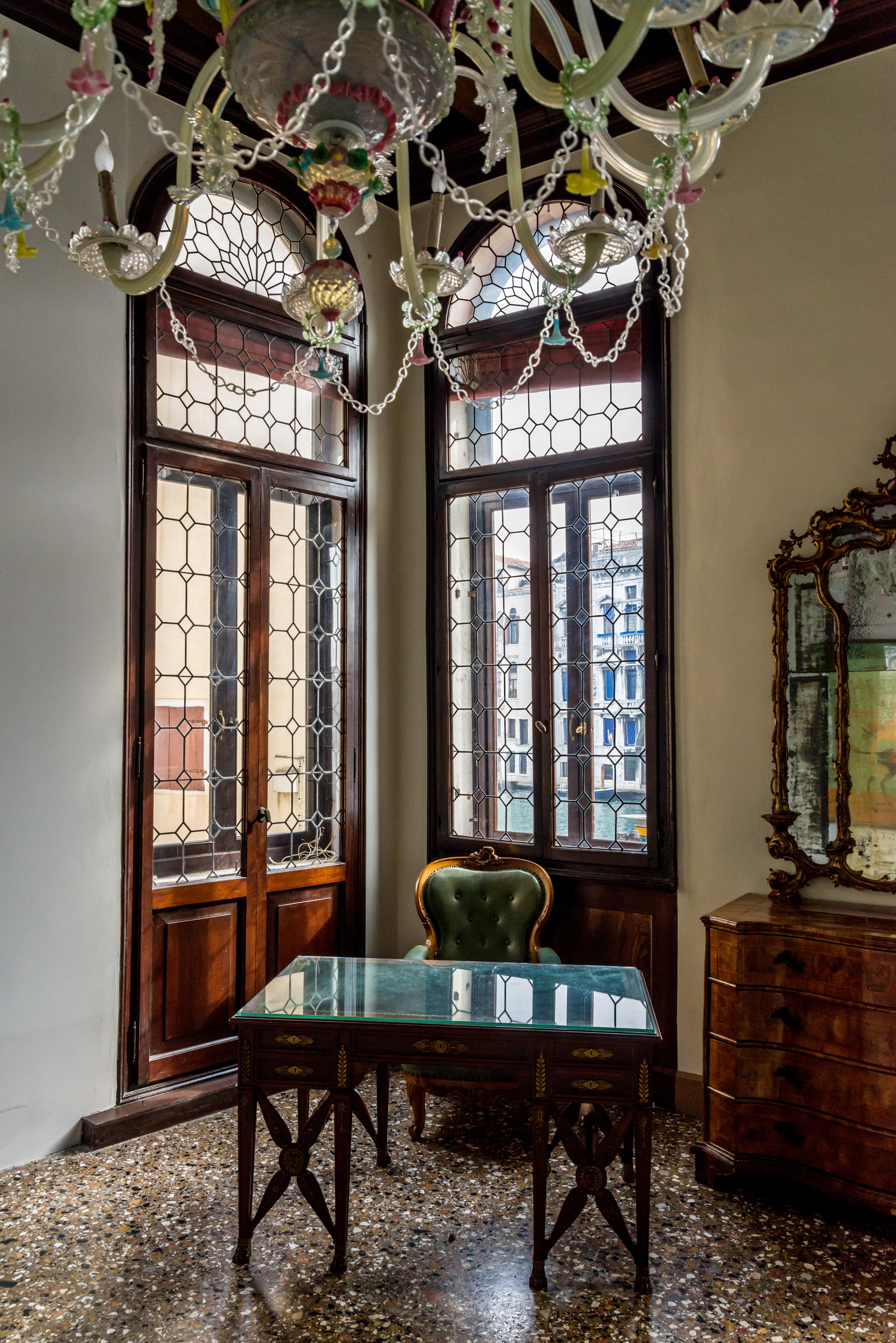
Interior details

== See also ==
- Palazzo Dandolo
