= Giovanni Battista Cimaroli =

Italian painter (1687-1771)

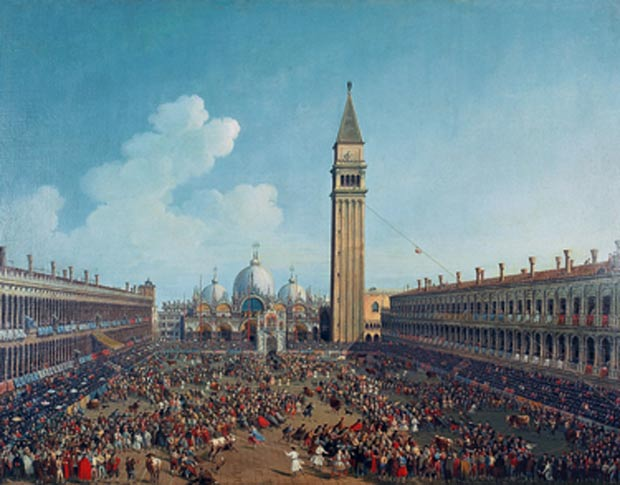
The Running of the Bulls in Plaza San Marco. Venice

Giovanni Battista Cimaroli (1687–1771) was an Italian painter of rustic landscapes with farms, villas and graceful figures and capricci of ruins and views of towns in the Veneto.

== Biography ==
He was born in Salò on Lake Garda, not far from Brescia. When he was born this area was in the Republic of Venice. He studied under Antonio Aureggio and later in Bologna with the landscape painter Antonio Calza, before moving to Venice around 1713. Cimaroli's rustic landscapes are reminiscent of the Arcadian scenes of Francesco Zuccarelli, influenced by a tradition of Lombardian realism.

Cimaroli collaborated c. 1722–6, with Canaletto (amongst other Venetian painters) on Owen McSwiney's unusual Allegorical Tombs series, whose aim was to memorialize British worthies, the main sponsor being the 2nd Duke of Richmond. Caneletto's vedute became the inspiration for Cimaroli's topographical views of Venice, which until recently have often been concealed under misattributions to Canaletto.

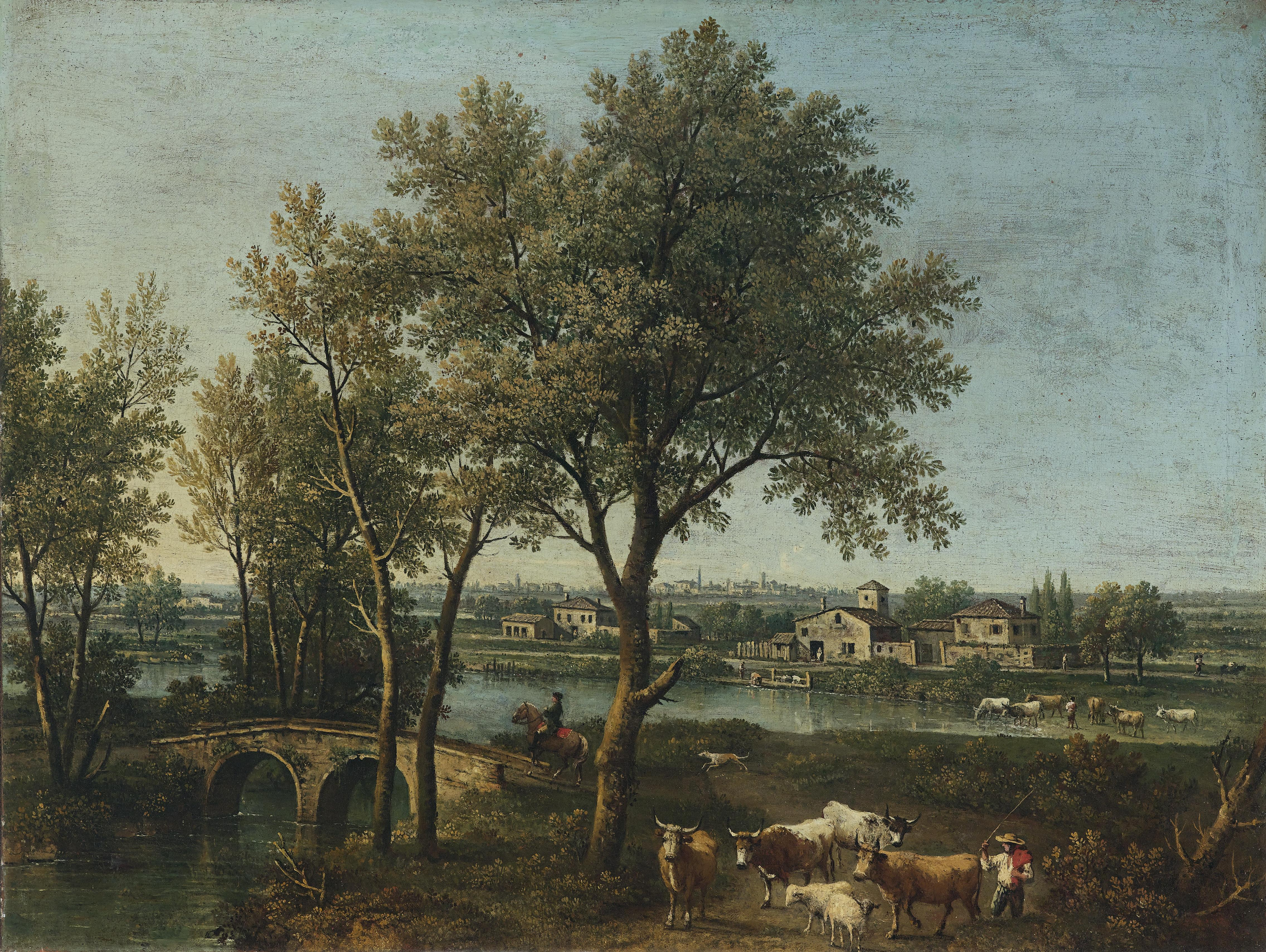
River landscape with shepherds and flock

Important early patrons of Cimaroli were Marshal Schulenberg, Count Tessin of Sweden, and the British merchant and diplomat settled in Venice, Joseph (Consul) Smith. It was through the disposition of Consul Smith's art collection, hand-picked by Smith for King George III, that six landscapes by Cimaroli entered the Royal Collection, of which three oval views survive. Cimaroli, despite the esteem of contemporaries, was nearly forgotten until the mid-twentieth century, but has undergone a revival of critical interest, typified by the publication of the first catalogue raisonné of his paintings.
