= Francesco Zuccarelli =

Italian painter (1702–1788)

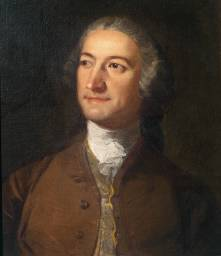
- Portrait of Zuccarelli by Richard Wilson
- Born: Giacomo Francesco Zuccarelli; 15 August 1702; Pitigliano, Grand Duchy of Tuscany
- Died: 30 December 1788 (aged 86); Florence
- Known for: Painting; drawing
- Movement: Rococo
- Patrons: Joseph (Consul) Smith

Giacomo Francesco Zuccarelli (commonly known as Francesco Zuccarelli, Italian pronunciation: [franˈtʃesko ddzukkaˈrɛlli; ttsuk-]; 15 August 1702 – 30 December 1788) was an Italian artist of the late Baroque or Rococo period. He is considered to be the most important landscape painter to have emerged from his adopted city of Venice during the mid-eighteenth century, and his Arcadian views became popular throughout Europe and especially in England where he resided for two extended periods. His patronage extended to the nobility, and he often collaborated with other artists such as Antonio Visentini and Bernardo Bellotto.

In 1768, Zuccarelli became a founding member of the Royal Academy of Arts, and upon his final return to Italy, he was elected president of the Venetian Academy. In addition to his rural landscapes which frequently incorporated religious and classical themes, Zuccarelli created devotional pieces and on occasion did portraiture. Besides paintings, his varied output included etchings, drawings, and designs for tapestries as well as a set of Old Testament playing cards.

Despite the fame he experienced in his lifetime, Zuccarelli's reputation declined in the early 19th century with naturalism becoming increasingly favoured in landscapes. Turner criticized him in mild terms while confessing that his figures could be beautiful, paving the way for more severe Victorian assessments. In 1959, the art historian Michael Levey offered suggestions for why Zuccarelli held such wide contemporary appeal among the English, concluding that his best work is highly decorative. More recently, since the 1990s there has been a renewed focus on Zuccarelli among Italian scholars, who have given him prominence in several books and articles, and his paintings and drawings are regularly shown in exhibitions.

== Rome and Tuscany (1702–32) ==
The third-youngest of four sons, Giacomo Francesco Zuccarelli was born at Pitigliano, in southern Tuscany, on 15 August 1702. His prosperous father Bartolomeo owned several local vineyards, and also in the northwest not far from Pisa, a shop offering kitchen tools and spices. Around the age of eleven or twelve, Zuccarelli began his apprenticeship in Rome with the portrait painters Giovanni Maria Morandi (1622–1717) and his pupil Pietro Nelli (1672–1740), under whose tutelage he learned the elements of design while absorbing the lessons of Roman classicism. Zuccarelli completed his first commission in his hometown of Pitigliano in the years 1725–27, a pair of chapel altarpieces. With the sponsorship of the Florentine art connoisseur, Niccolò Gabburri (1676–1742), from 1728 to 1731 he devoted his energies mostly to etching, eventually producing at least 43 prints, the majority consisting of two series which recorded the deteriorating frescoes of Giovanni da San Giovanni (1592–1636) and Andrea del Sarto (1486–1531). During his five years spent in Florence, though preoccupied with figurative subjects, he began to experiment with drawings in the landscape, as shown by works now preserved in the department of prints and drawings at the Uffizi, including a view of the Tuscan capital. According to Luigi Lanzi, writing in the 1790s, the Roman landscape painter and etcher Paolo Anesi (1697–1773) was the key mentor of Zuccarelli in the genre which eventually led to his renown. (Note: Olivier cites Lanzi as the source which states Zuccarelli followed Anesi's lead in painting landscapes, but Olivier notes a certain hesitation in wording when comparing Lanzi's 1792 and 1795 editions. However, it seems likely that Zuccarelli already knew Anesi from Rome, or met him in Florence via their common friend Gabburri, whose collection of paintings were devoted almost exclusively to landscape, and included five by Anesi, four from Ricci, and one of Claude. Both Zuccarelli and Anesi exhibited in Florence at the Academy of Design in 1729, held in the cloister of the basilica Santissima Annunziata, through Gabburri who had been a leading organizer of the event since 1705.)

== Twenty years in Venice (1732–52) ==
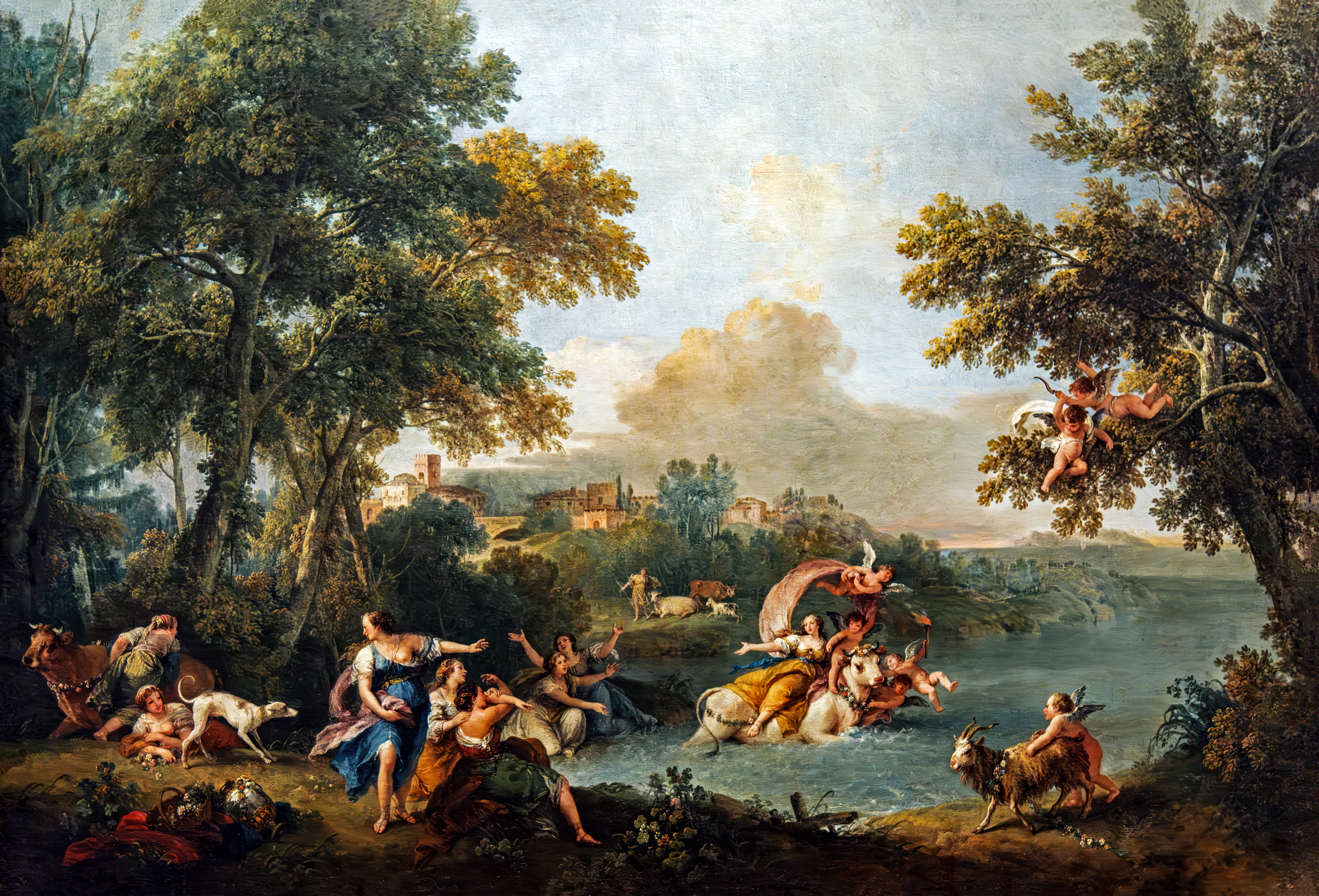
The Rape of Europa. Mid–1740s. Gallerie dell'Accademia, Venice.

In 1732, after a stay of several months in Bologna, Zuccarelli relocated to Venice. (Note: In Bologna, Zuccarelli published a book of prints dedicated to an unknown Florentine friend. There is some disagreement about the timing and extent of Zuccarelli's movements from his Florentine period in the late 1720s to his arrival in Venice, which a few commentators date to 1730.) Prior to his arrival in the Republic, the death of Marco Ricci in 1730 had created an opening in the field of landscape painting amid a marketplace crowded with history painters. While continuing to paint religious and mythological works, he increasingly devoted his attention to landscapes, drawing inspiration from the classicism of Claude and the Roman school. His early paintings from the 1730s show briefly the influence of Alessandro Magnasco, and for a longer period, of Ricci. Zuccarelli brought a more mellow and airy palette to the typically Venetian colours, and using tonal values of higher luminous content than Ricci, the figures in his idyllic landscapes came to life. An almost immediate success in Venice, he enjoyed early patronage, from amongst others, Johann Matthias von der Schulenburg; Joseph (Consul) Smith, who became his longtime patron; and Francesco Algarotti; who recommended him to Augustus III of Poland. In 1735, Zuccarelli married Giustina Agata Simonetti in the church of Santa Maria Zobenigo in Venice, and they had four daughters, the first two dying as infants, followed by two sons. He attended the baptism of the daughter of the painter Gaspare Diziani in 1743, and he often worked with other artists, including Bernardo Bellotto and Antonio Visentini. Under the auspices of Consul Smith, during the mid–1740s he produced with Visentini a series featuring neo-Palladian architecture, as can be seen in Burlington House (1746). The most interesting of the Zuccarelli and Visentini collaborations was a set of 52 playing cards with Old Testament subjects published in Venice in 1748. The hand-coloured scenes are treated in a light manner; the suits are circles, diamonds, hearts, and jars, each containing a mixture of inscribed emblems; and the cards begin with the creation of Adam and end with a battle scene that has an elephant carrying a castle. (Note: Succi published the entire set in 1986. As written by Massar in 1998, before the museum's closure in 2001, the set formerly held in the collection of the United States Playing Card Company, in Cincinnati, Ohio, was of particular interest because it contained Zuccarelli's original graphite drawings for the cards. Massar noted that the drawings exemplified Zuccarelli's soft, feathery touch.) The outstanding achievement of his first Venetian period was a series of seven canvases, now located at Windsor Castle, (Note: A letter from William Pitt to King George III, dated 27 December 1804, states that three of the paintings were moved from Hampton Court to Windsor Castle on the orders of His Majesty. At a later date, Landscape with a Woman Wading in a Pond with Ducks was relocated from Windsor Castle to Buckingham Palace.) which according to a note in an 18th-century manuscript catalogue, represent the biblical characters of Rebecca with Jacob and Esau. (Note: Cust, in his introduction to the Italian List, stated that internal evidence indicates the catalogue was prepared by Consul Smith.) The tall paintings are delicately painted and dream-like, and most likely were originally situated at Consul Smith's villa at Mogliano Veneto. He also occasionally created pastiches of various 17th-century Dutch masters. (Note: Levey writes of three works showing a mid-17th century Dutch influence in the Royal Collection. Landscape with a Wayside Tavern, (possibly a pastiche of Wouvermans), Hampton Court; Landscape with Ruins and Beggar, (a more obvious pastiche of Berchem), Windsor Castle; and Landscape with a Sleeping Child and a Woman Milking a Cow, noted in the Italian List as being a pendant to a work formerly attributed to Rembrandt, and "in his stile [sic]," at Holyroodhouse.)

In the years 1748 to 1751, Zuccarelli made frequent trips to Bergamo, invited by his friend Francesco Maria Tassi. Through Tassi, he met Cesare Femi, a student of the portrait painter Fra Galgario, and under his influence he realized three portraits now held at the Accademia Carrara.

Around this time, Zuccarelli's paint handling became more responsive to mood, utilizing bright colours that demonstrate a vibrant quality even though thinly laid on. The artist Richard Wilson painted a portrait of Zuccarelli in 1751 at Venice, and Zuccarelli was influential in redirecting Wilson away from portraits and towards landscape painting. During the following year, Zuccarelli discussed the techniques of Italian Renaissance painters with Joshua Reynolds, with Zuccarelli expressing the opinion that Paolo Veronese and Tintoretto painted on gesso grounds, while Titian did not.

== First English period (1752–1762) ==
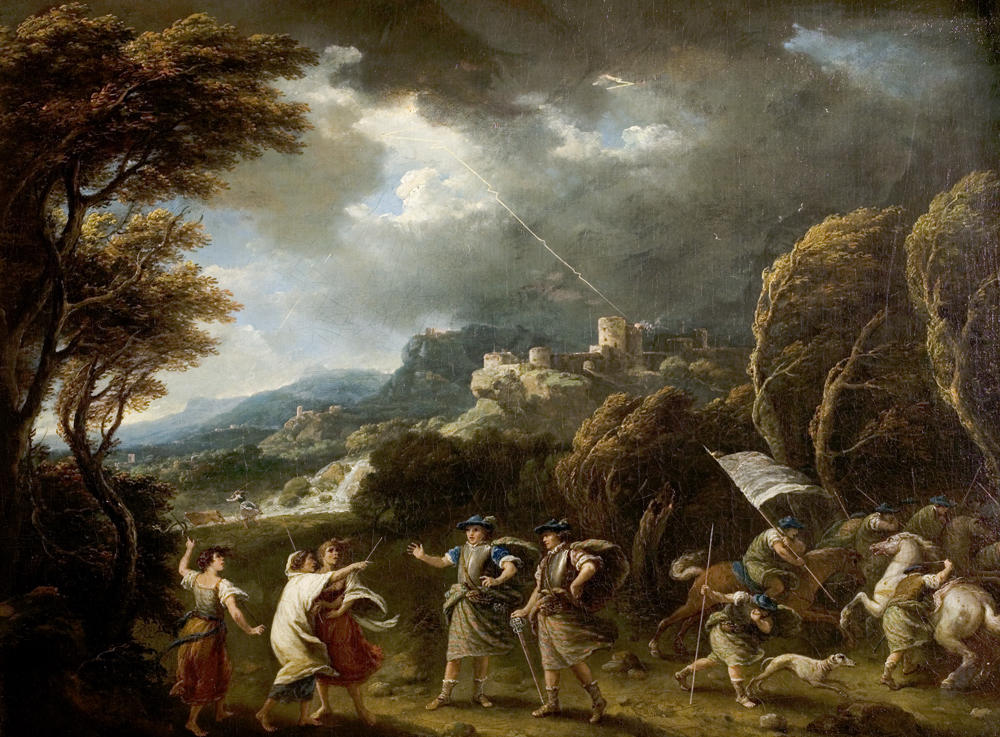
Macbeth and the Witches. c. 1760.

According to Henry Angelo, it was Richard Dalton, the royal librarian, who persuaded Zuccarelli to travel to England. Consul Smith was also likely involved in some way. A splendid canvas of the artist's early English period, signed and dated 1753, depicts a cheerful country festival. The Arcadian style remains his best known, where nature is transfigured into pleasant scenery, representing a platonic golden age, pervaded with beauty and love.

His decorative talent resulted in diverse work, including the design of tapestries with the weaver Paul Saunders at Holkham Hall. Based on the tapestry cartoons, Zuccarelli was commissioned in 1758 by Thomas Coke, 1st Earl of Leicester to produce the corresponding paintings of Oriental themes, such as Pair with Dromedary.

By November 1757, Zuccarelli had become a member of the Society of Dilettanti. In 1760, he painted the elegiac Et in Arcadio Ego, a work described as an "admirable picture" by the poet George Keate. In the same year, Zuccarelli borrowed from Shakespeare, depicting a scene from Macbeth where Macbeth and Banquo encounter the three witches, noteworthy as being one of the first paintings to portray theatrical characters in a landscape. The impetus of the work may have come from the portrayals of Macbeth by the actor David Garrick, a later acquaintance. Its initial genesis was a pen and ink sketch, followed by paintings on panels and then canvas.

In this period, he also produced vedute, a genre new to him, seen for example in A View of the River Thames from Richmond Hill looking towards Twickenham, and the View of Vicenza with Ancient Monuments. Zuccarelli held a sale of his canvases in 1762 at Prestage and Hobbs in London, before his departure for Italy. The pictures listed for sale comprise a heterogeneous lot, including religious scenes, a portrait, the Four Seasons, and an Arabian horse Also in 1762, King George III acquired thirty of his works through the purchase of much of Consul Smith's extensive art collection and library in Venice.

== Venetian interlude (1762–1764) ==
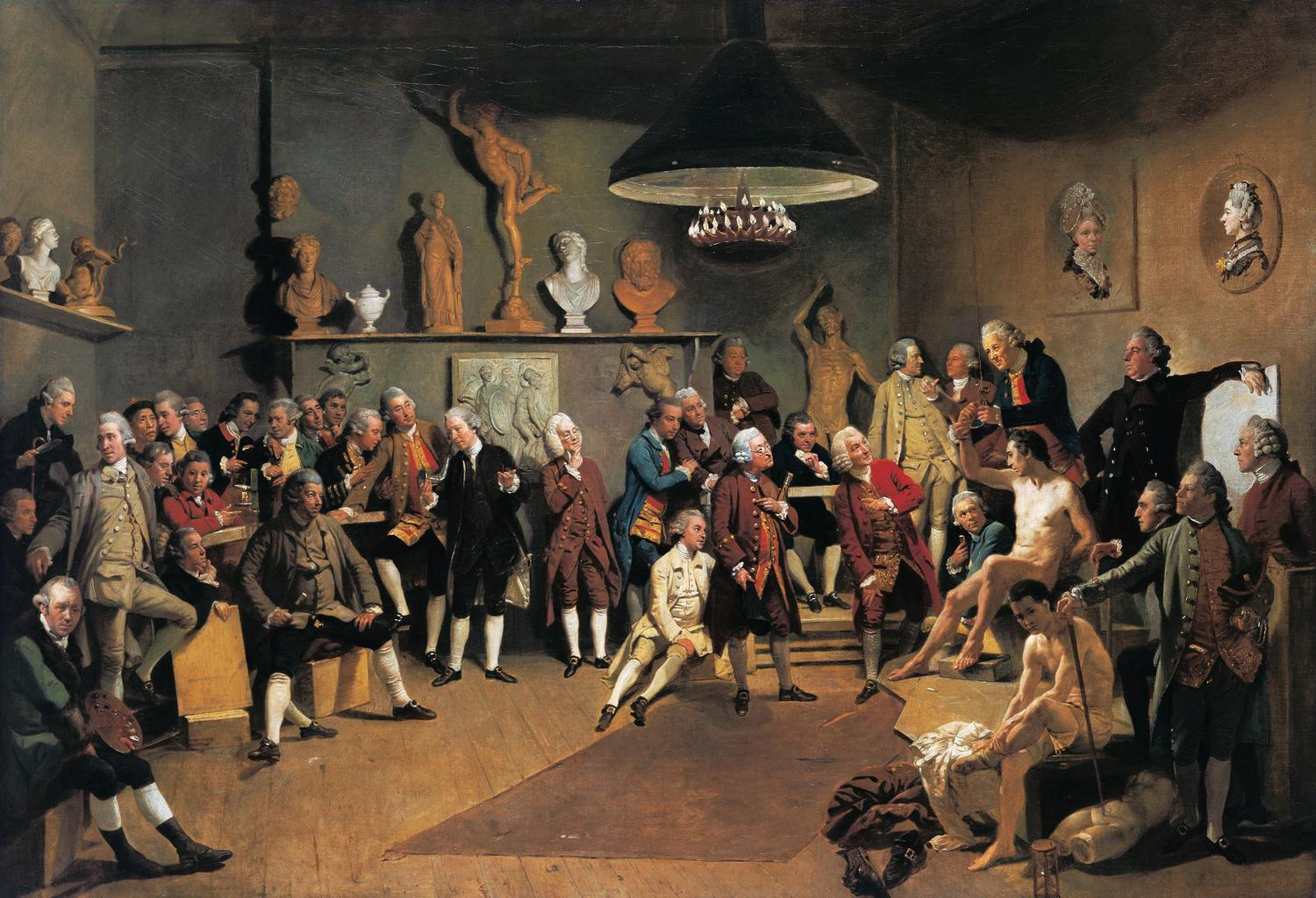
The Academicians of the Royal Academy, by John Zoffany, 1771–72. Francesco Zuccarelli is standing and wearing red. He is given prominence as an artist favoured by the king.

Zuccarelli arrived in Venice in September 1762, and he became a member of the Venetian Academy in 1763. There is only one known painting from this interval, the rather academic St. John the Baptist, a composition required by the academy after gaining admittance. Zuccarelli was induced to journey back to London in 1764 by his friend Algarotti's bequest of a cameo and group of drawings made to Lord Chatham.

== Second English period (1765–1771) ==
On this second visit to England, Zuccarelli was lauded by the English nobility and critics alike, and invited to exhibit at leading art societies. He continued to draw from diverse sources, as indicated by a work in a private collection. The peasant woman breast-feeding her child in a landscape shows the influence of Flemish-Dutch artists, Nordic clothing, and hints of Thomas Gainsborough, a favourite referent of Zuccarelli during the 1760s.

The artist contributed works to shows held by the Free Society of Artists in 1765, 1766, and 1782. In 1767, his painting Macbeth and the Witches, probably a third version, was exhibited at The Society of Artists. Shown alongside was the Journey of Jacob. The two paintings had differing compositional styles. While Macbeth had quick and almost unformed brushstrokes, Jacob revealed careful attention to detail. Macbeth later achieved widespread dissemination through a 1770 engraving by William Woollett.

Zuccarelli was a founding member, in 1768, of the Royal Academy of Arts. King George III commissioned the out-sized painting River Landscape with the Finding of Moses (1768), a privilege granted to no other Italian artist. (Note: The Crown also paid Zuccarelli £428.8s for 2 pictures and 2 frames on 12 January 1771, and Levey suggests the pictures may have been A Harbour Scene with Ruins, Figures and Cattle, and Landscape with a Temple and Cascade, both at Windsor Castle.) The painting, impeccable from a formal point of view, clearly shows the influences of Gaspard Dughet as well as Claude Lorrain. In 1769, Zucccarelli exhibited at the inaugural exhibition of the Royal Academy, showing two landscapes and figures; in 1770, three landscapes, a St. John Preaching in the Wilderness, and a Holy Family; and finally, in 1771, another Holy Family. As a postscript, the Finding of Moses was shown in 1773, two years after his departure to Italy.

== Final years in Italy (1771–88) ==
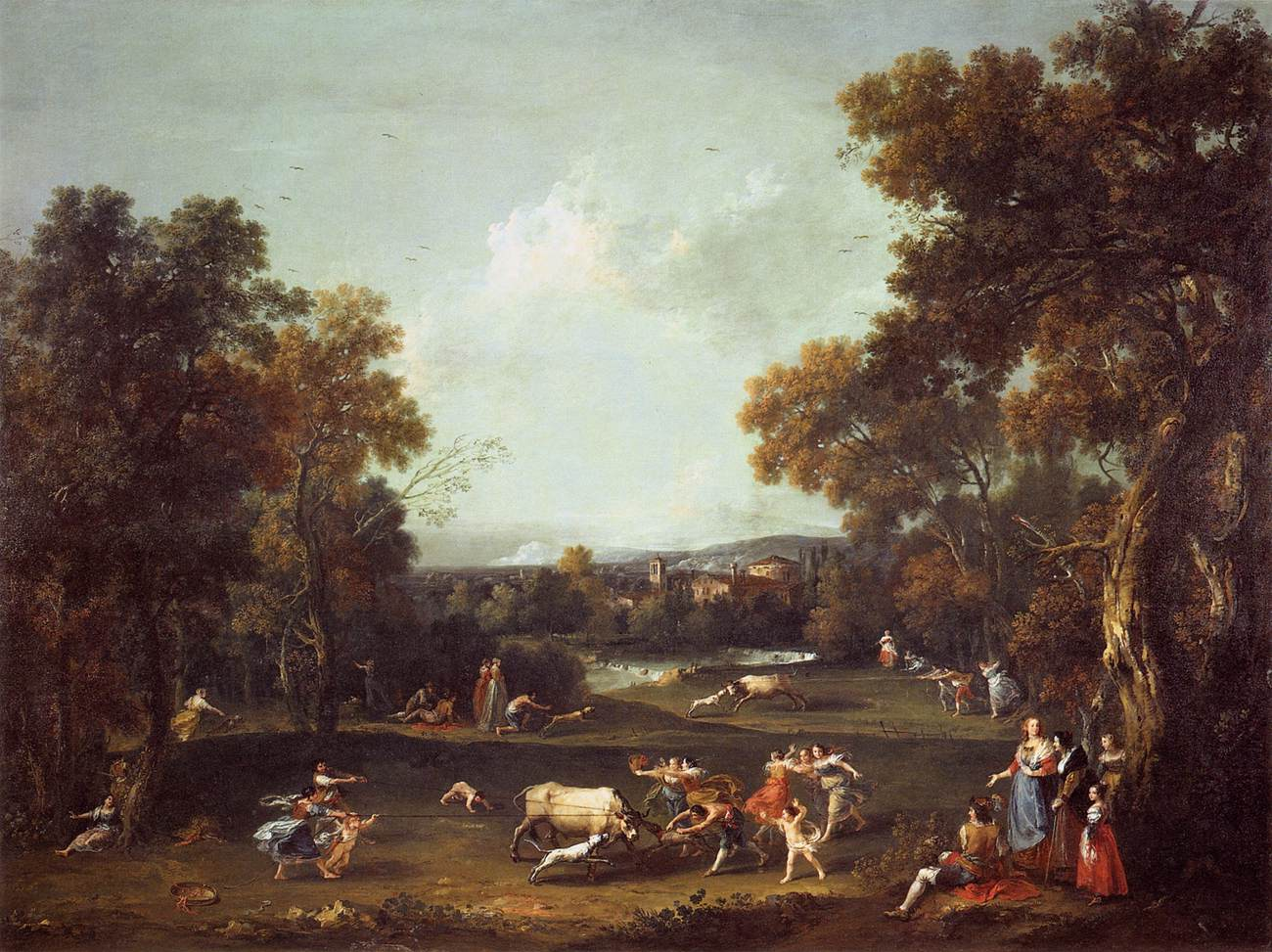
Bull Hunting. Gallerie dell'Accademia, Venice. Early 1770s.

Upon his return to Venice in 1771, Zuccarelli was received with affection and pride, and in September of that year, the artistic community appointed him director of the Academy of Fine Arts of Venice, followed by president in the following month. Now entering his eighth decade, he departed from his accustomed Arcadian landscapes and adopted an approach more congenial to the current Venetian taste, neoclassical in outlook, harkening back to his youthful emulation of Ricci. A masterpiece of his late maturity, the unusual Landscape with Bridge, Figures, and a Statue, adheres to the model of Francesco Guardi who reinvented capricci by casting them with pre-romantic moods, while at the same time, the composition gently mocks Guardi, by the placement of the statue in the centre of the composition. The painting has many elements common to Zuccarelli, such as a fisherman, waterfall, bridge with animals, traveller, and a peasant, but is done with quick brushstrokes, a technique characteristic of this period, and the atmosphere is one of pathos, recalling his earlier Macbeth and the Witches. Another beautiful canvas, Banquet of a Villa, at which outdoor diners sit at a festive table, is realistic in a manner reminiscent of Pietro Longhi, and the parallel and sloping bands of the landscape are typical of those favoured by English topographical artists. This continued desire to look at fresh approaches, even as he grew old, perhaps helps explain why Zuccarelli showed little interest in his role as president of the ossified Venetian Academy, where he was often absent from sessions. In 1774, without giving notice, and to the consternation of the membership, he departed permanently to Florence.

It is apparent that Zuccarelli kept in contact with Great Britain, for in 1775, he was commissioned for a set of four paintings destined for the Scottish residence of Wedderburn Castle, based on engravings of the ruins of Palmyra, first published by Robert Wood in 1753. The small Turkish-style figures standing amidst the classical ruins are in keeping with other oriental scenes of his late maturity, some of which are similar to paintings done by Giovanni Antonio Guardi for Zuccarelli's early patron Marshal Schulenburg in 1746–1747. Having been a member of the Florentine Academy of Design since his youth, Zuccarelli was created "Master of Nudes" at the academy in 1777, a more prestigious designation than that of a painter of landscapes, then considered a minor art form, in comparison to the traditional elite status given to figure drawing. Zuccarelli continued teaching at the academy until its reorganization in 1784.

In his will of 1787, Zuccarelli made his "beloved wife" Giustina his sole heir, and one and a half years later, he died in Florence on 30 December 1788. His lengthy obituary, which appeared in the Gazzetta Toscana, described his personality as "straightforward, humble, grateful, compassionate, generous, uniting these solid virtues in the most courteous tactful manner, with much grace in speaking", and it also took note that since his youth, he possessed a "natural genius" for landscapes.

== Reputation and legacy ==
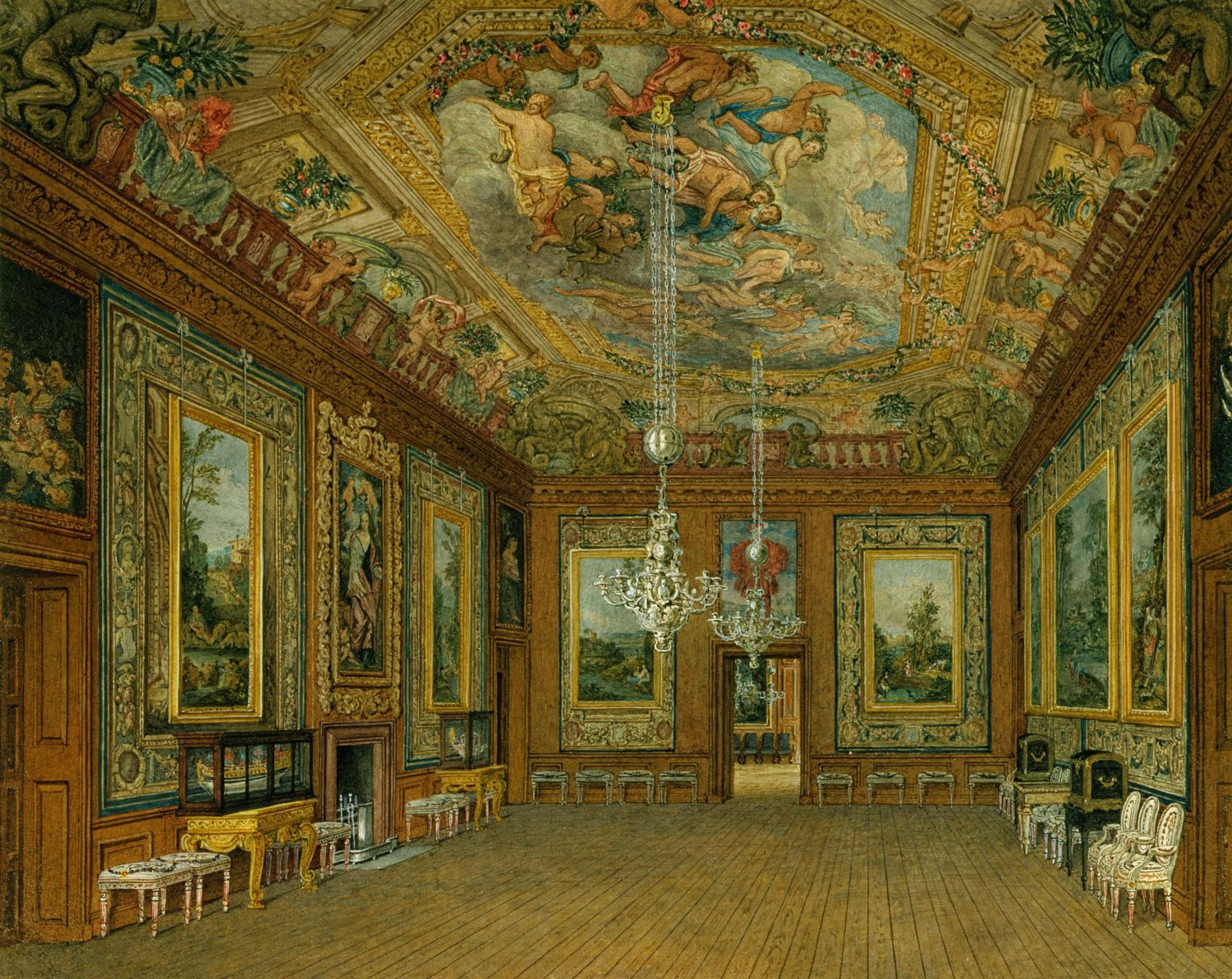
The Queen's State Drawing Room at Windsor Castle in 1816, depicting seven landscapes by Francesco Zuccarelli, underneath a ceiling fresco by Antonio Verrio. The room was commonly known as the Zuccarelli Room in the Victorian era. Watercolour by Charles Wild. (Note: This watercolour by Charles Wild, with touches of bodycolour over pencil, was first published as an engraving in 1816 by Thomas Sutherland (1785–1838), in preparation for Pynes' The History of the Royal Residences. The paintings by Zuccarelli were laid on Mortlake tapestries of the Seasons, situated beneath a ceiling painted by Antonio Verrio (1636–1707), depicting the Assembly of the Gods. During renovations in the 1830s, Verrio's fresco was replaced by decorative plasterwork, and Zuccarelli's paintings were hung in different places, while the underlying tapestries were removed. In 1854, Harriet Beecher Stowe wrote, "I was charmed also by the nine landscapes of Zuccarelli, which adorn the state drawing room. Zuccarelli was a follower of Claude, and these pictures far exceed in effect any of Claude's I have yet seen." The Zuccarelli Room stayed intact until shortly after Queen Victoria's death, when it was overhauled and became a picture gallery with displays of other old masters, and the Italian's paintings were moved elsewhere.)

Zuccarelli was one of the few Venetian painters of his era to win universal acclaim, even from critics who rejected the concept of Arcadia. He was especially popular among the followers of Rousseau. Francesco Maria Tassi (1716–1782), in his Lives of the Painters, Sculptors, and Architects of Bergamo remarks that Zuccarelli paints "landscapes with the most charming figures and thus excels not only artists of modern times but rivals the great geniuses of the past; for no one previously knew how to combine the delights of an harmonious ground with figures gracefully posed and represented in the most natural colours". With the move to more representational modes of depicting landscape in the 19th century, negative criticism began to develop, as described by the art historian Michael Levey in a landmark 1959 article, Francesco Zuccarelli in England. Turner's view was restrained, saying Zuccarelli's work was "meretricious", lacking the charm and grace of Watteau, and yet his figures were "sometimes beautiful". Victorian writers, among them partisans of Richard Wilson, sensitive to the neglect of their favourite while the Italian flourished, used adjectives such as theatrical and insincere. Levey contributed to a reevaluation of the artist by explaining the appeal of Zuccarelli to his contemporaries, drawing a parallel with the affection of the 18th century English for pastoral poetry, since everyone could recognize a pleasing convention when they saw one; in this case, a fairyland where "the skies are forever blue, the trees forever green." The exaltation of the rural life as a retreat from the bustle of urbanity had the sanction of a long and distinguished history; for "Virgil had recommended it, Petrarch had practiced it; Zuccarelli was left to illustrate it"; and in Levey's continuation, "at its best—in comparison to an age he never saw—Zuccarelli's work is highly decorative and still capable of giving pleasure". While sparsely treated in Italy for much of the 19th and early 20th centuries, the painter never fell into disfavour there as in England. The last few decades have seen a resurgence of interest in Zuccarelli by Italian scholars, notably by Federico Dal Forno, who published an artistic biography with sixty paintings in 1994, and Federica Spadotto, who issued a catalogue raisonné in 2007. In a larger cultural context, modern historians have considered him to be a figure of interest because of his love of escapism, seen as not untypical of the late Baroque.

During the mid to late 18th century Zuccarelli was widely imitated, and artists influenced by him included Richard Wilson, Giuseppe Zais, Giovanni Battista Cimaroli, and Vittorio Amedeo Cignaroli. Among those who created engravings after his work were Joseph Wagner, Fabio Berardi, Giovanni Volpato, Francesco Bartolozzi, and William Woollett.

The Francesco Zuccarelli Municipal Library and Historical Archives is located in the Fortezza Orsini Cultural Centre, in Pitigliano, Italy, the town of the artist's childhood. Also in the vicinity, the Museum of the Orsini Palace has on permanent exhibit Zuccarelli's earliest commissioned altarpieces.

== Identification ==
His paintings are rarely signed, (Note: Spadotto's catalogue raisonné of 430 paintings only describes 26 with signatures.) yet they often contain a gourd water bottle that was held at the waist by rural Italian women, a punning allusion to his surname, zucco being the Italian word for gourd. A defining touch found consistently across the long span of Zuccarelli's career is a sweet expression on the faces of his rounded figures.

== Selected paintings ==
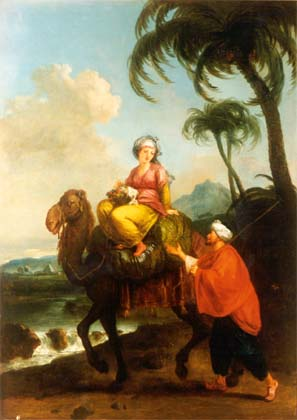
Pair with Dromedary. c. 1756–8. Palazzo Thiene, Vicenza.

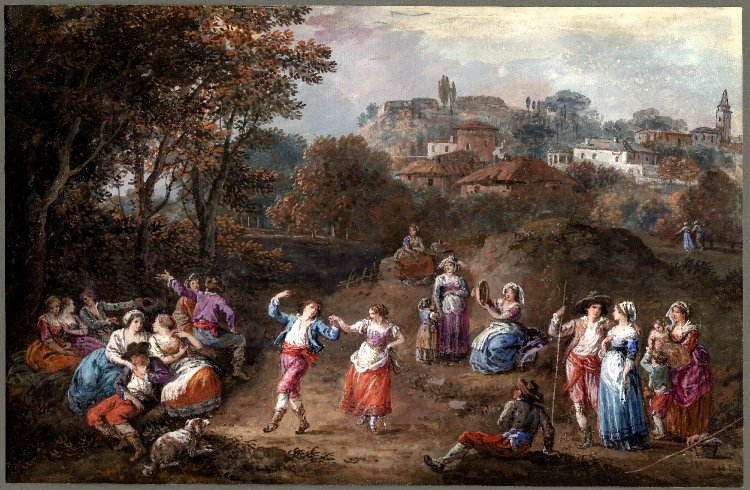
Italian Landscape with a Country Festival. Drawing with body colour. British Museum, London.

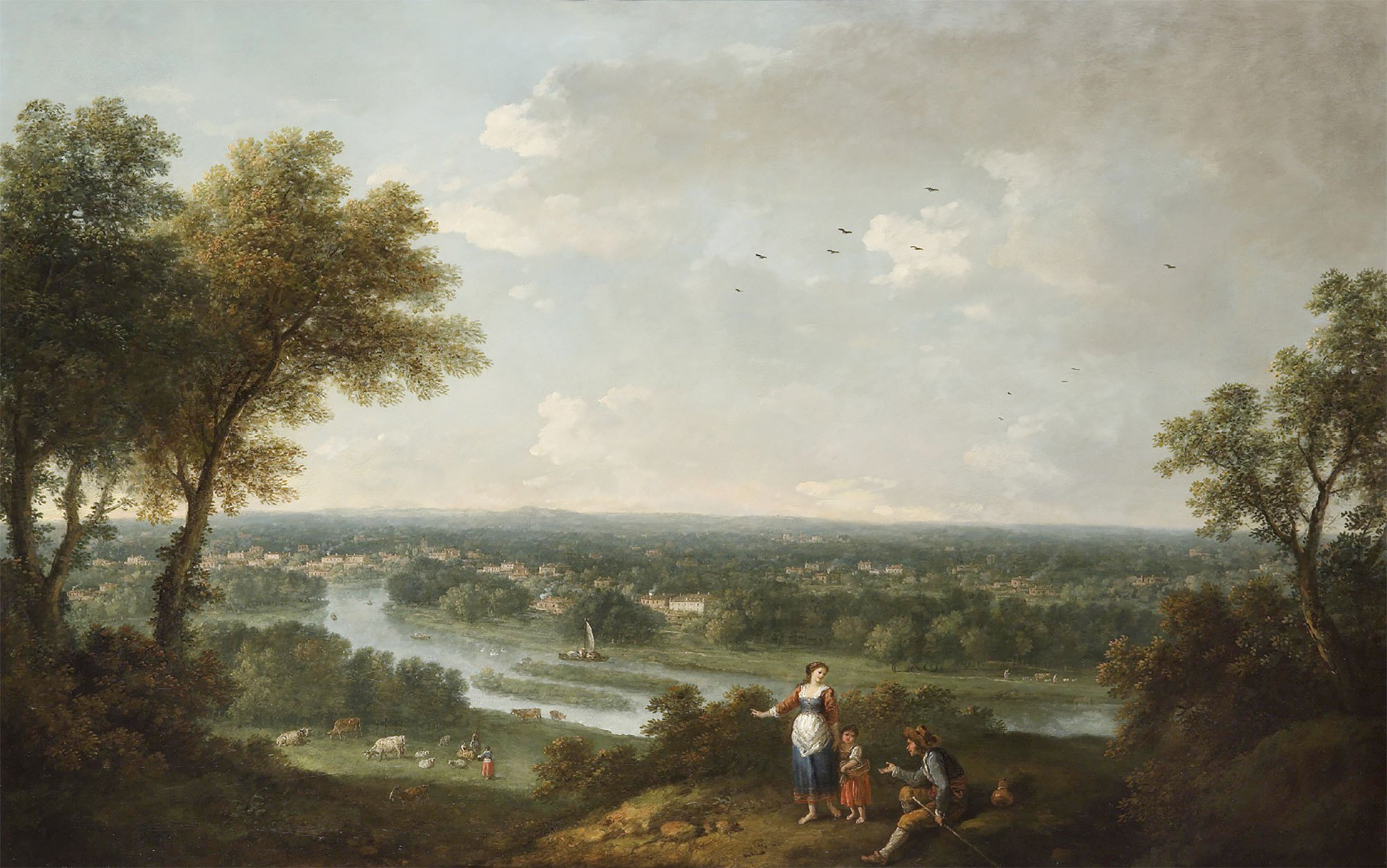
A View of the River Thames from Richmond Hill looking towards Twickenham, c. 1760.

- Saint Michael the Archangel defeating the Devil; and The Redeemer and the Holy Souls of Purgatory (1725–27) - Oil on canvas, 292 cm x 197 cm, Museo di Palazzo Orsini, Pitigliano
- Landscape with a Castle; and Landscape with a Bridge (c. 1735) - Oil on canvas, 56 cm x 73 cm, Museum of Fine Arts, Budapest
- Landscape with River and Shepherds at Rest; and Landscape with Bridge and Knight (c. 1736) - Oil on canvas, 41 cm x 62 cm, Accademia Carrara, Bergamo
- Landscape with Peasants at a Fountain (c. 1740) - Oil on canvas, 79.4 cm x 120.6 cm, Metropolitan Museum of Art, New York
- Landscape with a Sleeping Child and a Woman Milking a Cow (early 1740s) - Oil on panel, 61 cm x 91.4 cm, Holyrood Palace, Edinburgh
- Landscape with a Wayside Tavern (early 1740s) - Oil on canvas, 82.6 cm x 113 cm, Hampton Court Palace, East Molesey, Surrey
- Landscape with a Woman fording a Stream on Horseback (c. 1742–43) - Oil on canvas, 36.8 cm x 50.2 cm, Windsor Castle, Windsor
- Roman Capriccio with Triumphal Arch, the Pyramid of Cestius, St. Peter's Basilica and the Castle of the Holy Angel (with Bernardo Bellotto, 1742–47) - Oil on canvas, 117 cm x 132 cm, Galleria nazionale, Parma
- Wooded Landscape with the Meeting of Isaac and Rebecca (1743) - Oil on canvas, 230 cm x 448 cm, Windsor Castle, Windsor (Note: In the first volume of his The History of the Royal Residences, Pyne in 1819 states "It was upon that picture [The Meeting of Isaac and Rebecca] that Zuccarelli rested his fame, and upon its reputation he found so much employment in England," and in addition, that "its composition is very superior" to the even larger The Finding of Moses. However, Levey qualifies Pyne by saying that his words shouldn't be taken very literally, as Zuccarelli had been well employed in England for at least ten years when the painting arrived, but it may well have attracted attention, if only due to its size.)
- Landscape with Jacob Watering Laban's Flock (1743) - Oil on canvas, 230.5 cm x 138.4 cm, Windsor Castle, Windsor
- Landscape with a Waterfall and Two Women with a Boy Fishing (1740–45) - Oil on canvas, 133.3 cm x 79.1 cm, Buckingham Palace, City of Westminster
- Bacchanal (c. 1745) - Oil on canvas, 142 cm x 210 cm, Gallerie dell'Accademia, Venice
- The Banqueting Hall, Whitehall (with Antonio Visentini, 1746) - Oil on canvas, 84.1 cm x 128.9 cm, Windsor Castle, Windsor
- Silenus with Nymphs (1747) - Oil on canvas, 107 cm x 142 cm, Sanssouci, Potsdam
- Saint Jerome Emiliani with Orphans and the Virgin in Glory with Child (1748) - Oil on canvas, 270 cm x 181.5 cm, Pinacoteca Repossi, Chiari
- Portrait of Ercole Comini at Two Years (1751) - Oil on canvas, 51 cm x 41 cm, Accademia Carrara, Bergamo
- Pastoral Scene (early 1750s) - Oil on canvas, 60 cm x 88 cm, Hermitage Museum, Saint Petersburg
- Eastern Couple with Dromedary (c. 1756–58) - Oil on canvas, 180 cm x 130 cm, Palazzo Thiene, Vicenza
- Refreshment during the Ride (c. 1760) - Oil on canvas, 72 cm x 105 cm, Fitzwilliam Museum, Cambridge
- Et in Arcadio Ego (1760) - Oil on canvas, 76.2 cm x 90.17 cm, collection Sir James Fergusson, London
- River Landscape with the Finding of Moses (1768) - Oil on canvas, 227.3 cm x 386 cm, Windsor Castle, Windsor
- Saint John the Baptist Preaching on the River Jordan (late 1760s) - Oil on canvas, 56 cm x 97 cm, Pinacoteca di Brera, Milan
- Bull Hunting (early 1770s) - Oil on canvas, 114 cm x 150 cm, Gallerie dell'Accademia, Venice
- Banquet at a Villa (1770–1775) - Oil on canvas, 80 cm x 163 cm, Fondo Ambiente Italiano, Milan

== Selected exhibitions showing his works ==
- Exhibition of Italian Pictures from the 1600s and 1700s - Milan, 1922
- Exhibition of Italian Art - London, 1930
- Exhibition of Venetian Landscape Painting from the 1700s - Rome, 1940
- Five Centuries of Venetian Painting - Venice, 1945
- Eighteenth Century Venice - London, 1951
- An Exhibition of 18th Century Venice - Detroit, 1953
- From Caravaggio to Tiepolo - Rome, 1954
- Italian Art and Britain - London, 1960
- Landscapes and Vedute - Milan, 1967
- Venice in the 18th Century - Paris, 1971
- George III Collector and Patron - London, 1974
- European Drawings from the Fitzwilliam - New York, 1976–1977
- Portrait of Italy in the Century of Tiepolo - Paris, 1982
- Aspects of Venetian Painting in the 18th Century - Madrid, 1990
- The Glory of Venice - London and Washington, 1994–1995
- The Grand Tour: Landscape and Veduta Paintings, Venice and Rome in the 18th Century - Atlanta, 1996
- From Canaletto to Zuccarelli: Venetian Landscapes of the 1700s - Milan, 2003
- Portrait of the City: The Vicenza Palladio in the Views of Zuccarelli - Vicenza, 2017
- Canaletto and the Art of Venice - Buckingham Palace, 2017

== Gallery ==
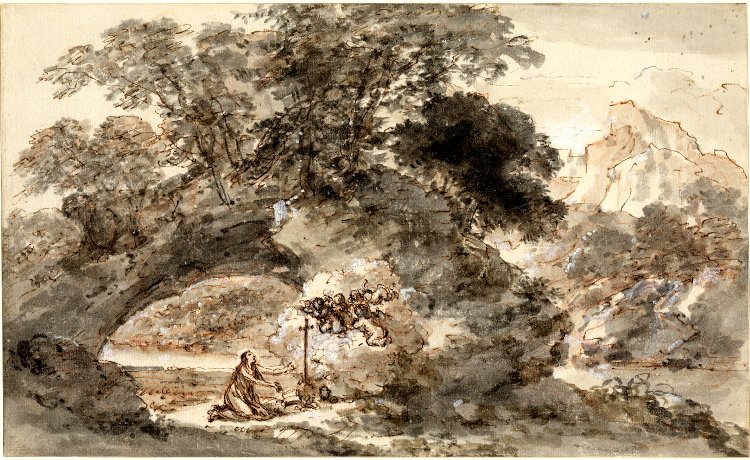
Landscape with the Penitent Magdalene. c. 1728. Drawing. British Museum. (Note: Pen and brown ink with red chalk, and grey and brown wash, touched with white.)

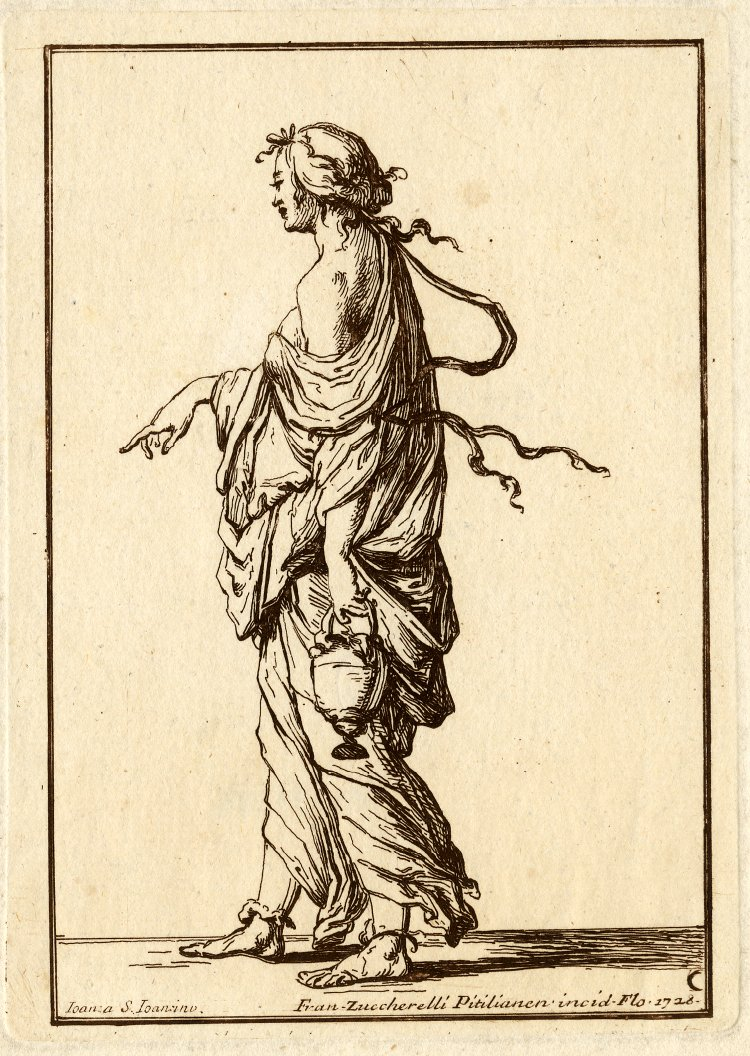
Standing Female Figure Carrying a Lamp. Etching. Florence, 1728. (Note: After Giovanni da San Giovanni.)

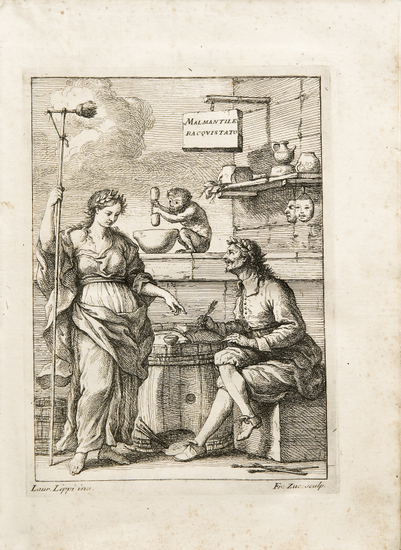
Il Malmantile racquistato. Etching. Florence, 1731.

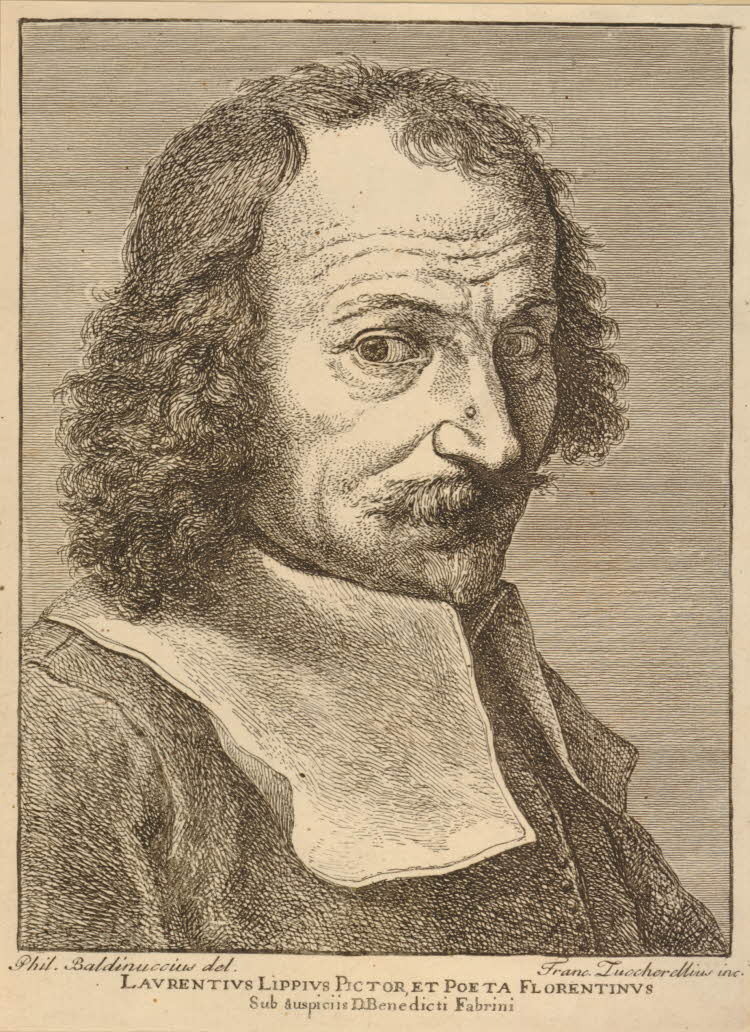
Lorenzo Lippi, after a drawing by Filippo Baldinucci. Florence, 1731.

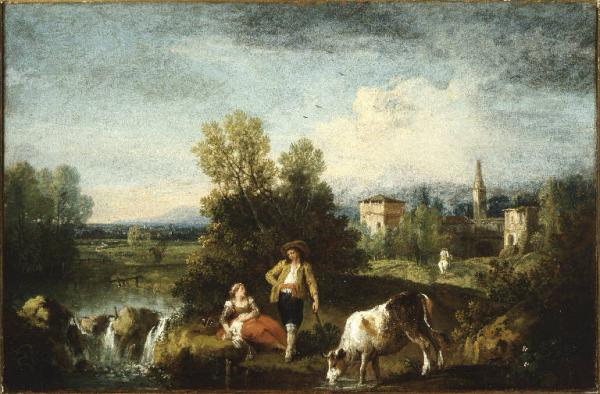
Landscape with River and Shepherds at Rest. c. 1736. Accademia Carrara, Bergamo.

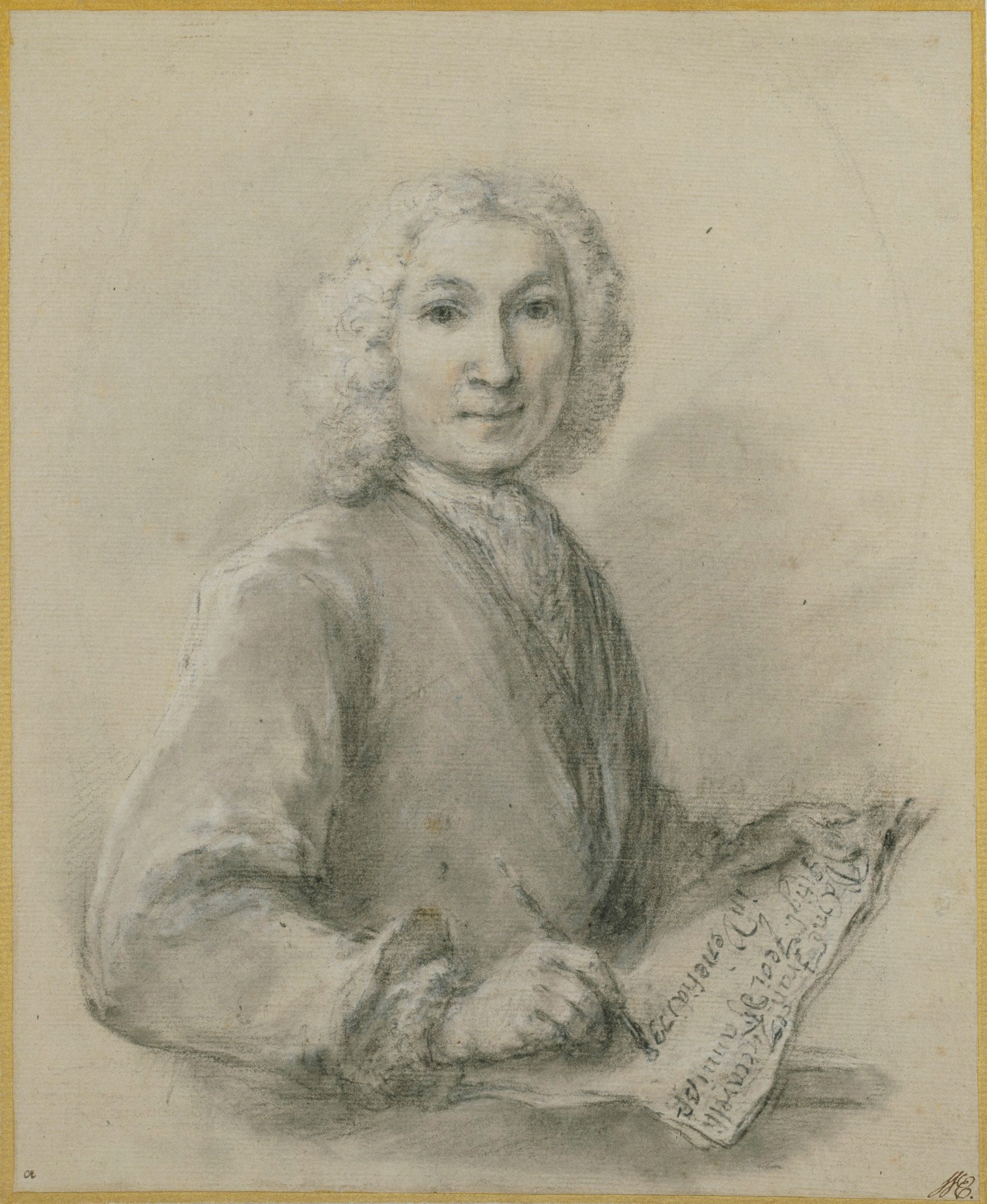
Self-portrait. Drawing in chalks. 1736 or 1738. Royal Academy of Arts, London.

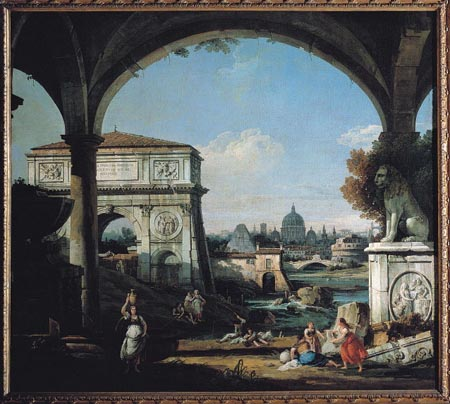
Roman Capriccio with Triumphal Arch, the Pyramid of Cestius, St. Peter's Basilica and the Castle of the Holy Angel. Bernardo Bellotto and Francesco Zuccarelli. Mid–1740s. Galleria nazionale, Parma.

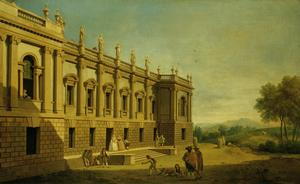
Burlington House. Antonio Visentini and Francesco Zuccarelli. 1746. Windsor Castle, Windsor.

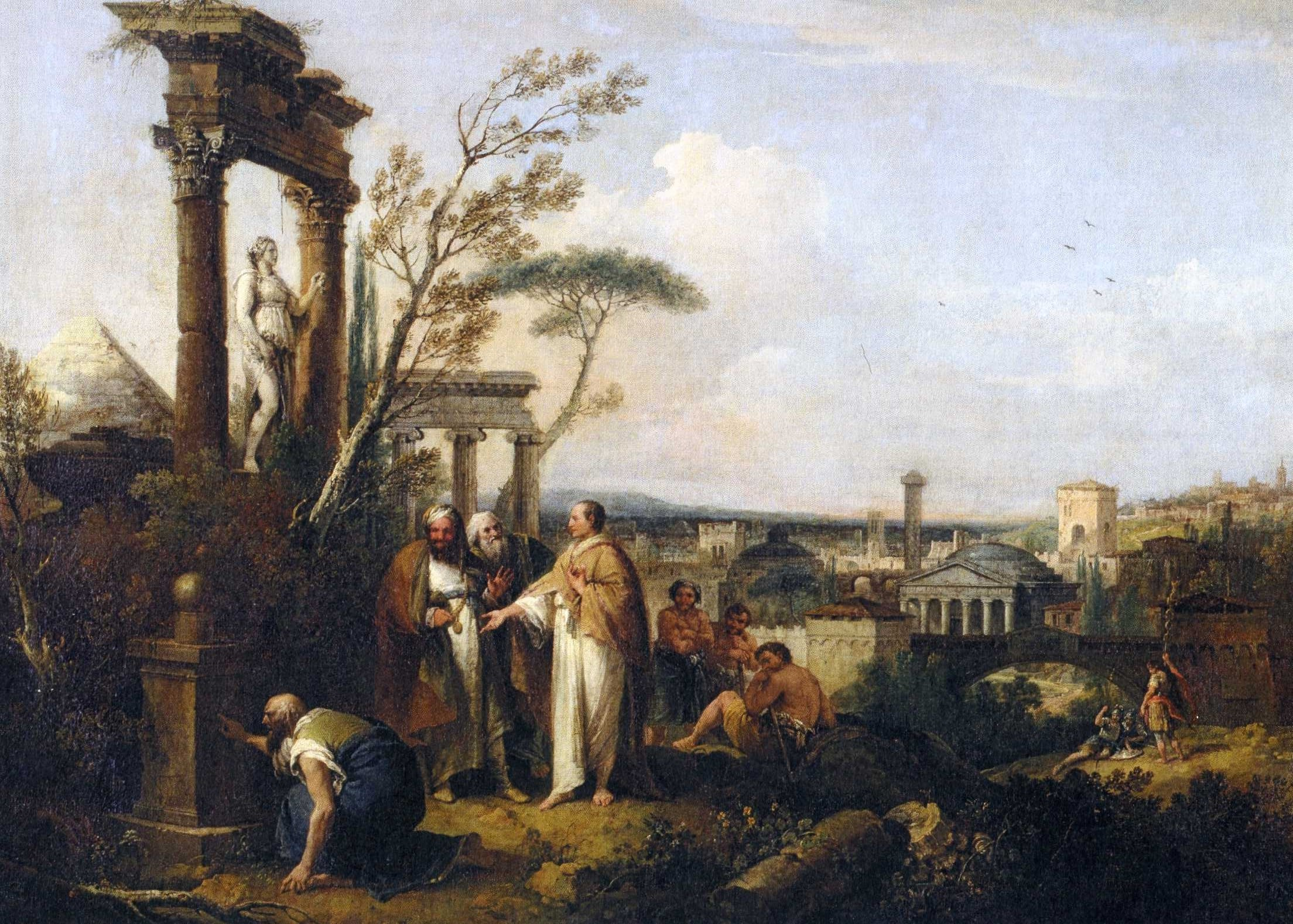
Cicero Finds the Tomb of Archimedes. 1747. Sanssouci, Potsdam.

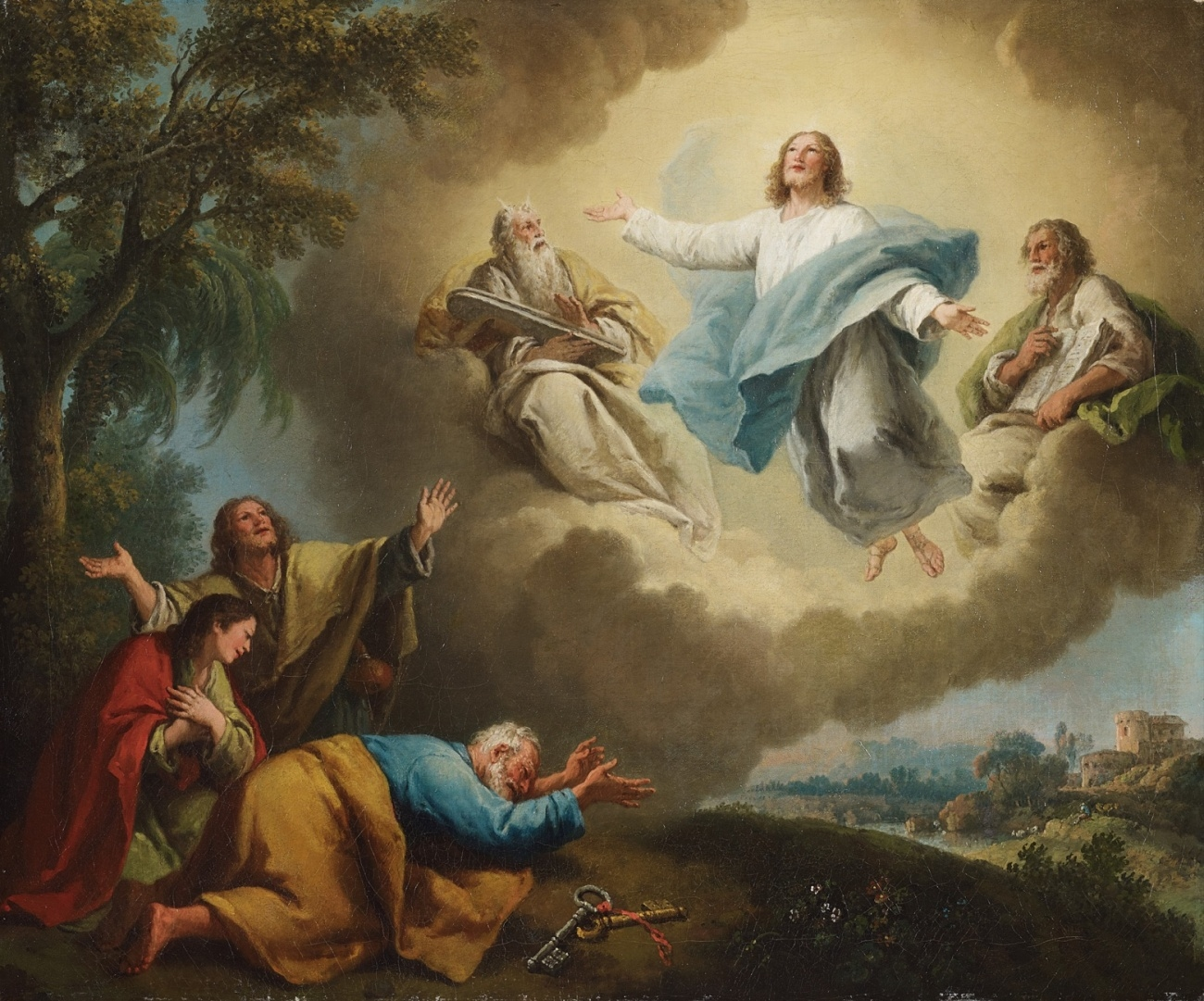
Transfiguration of Jesus. 1747.

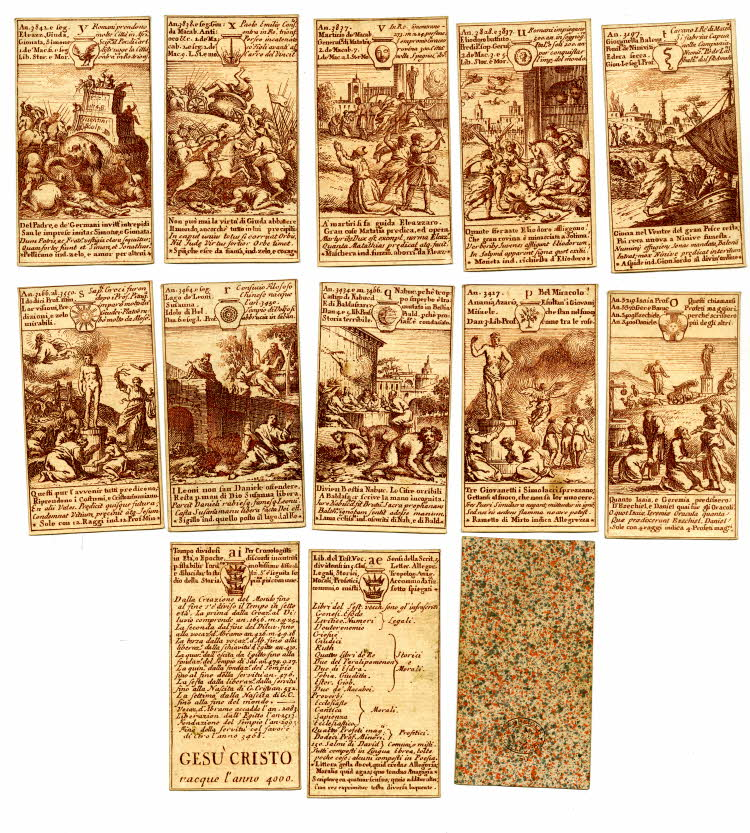
Old Testament Playing Cards. Francesco Zuccarelli and Antonio Visentini. Venice, 1748. British Museum. (Note: A complete set of 52 playing cards, bequeathed by Lady Charlotte Guest in 1896, accompanied by the original leather case.)

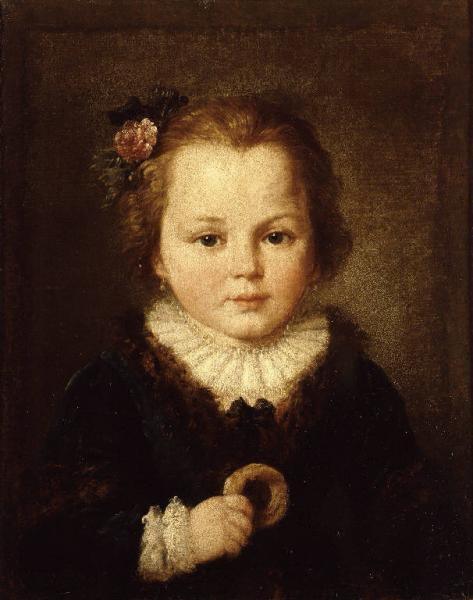
Margheritina Tassi. 1751. Accademia Carrara, Bergamo.

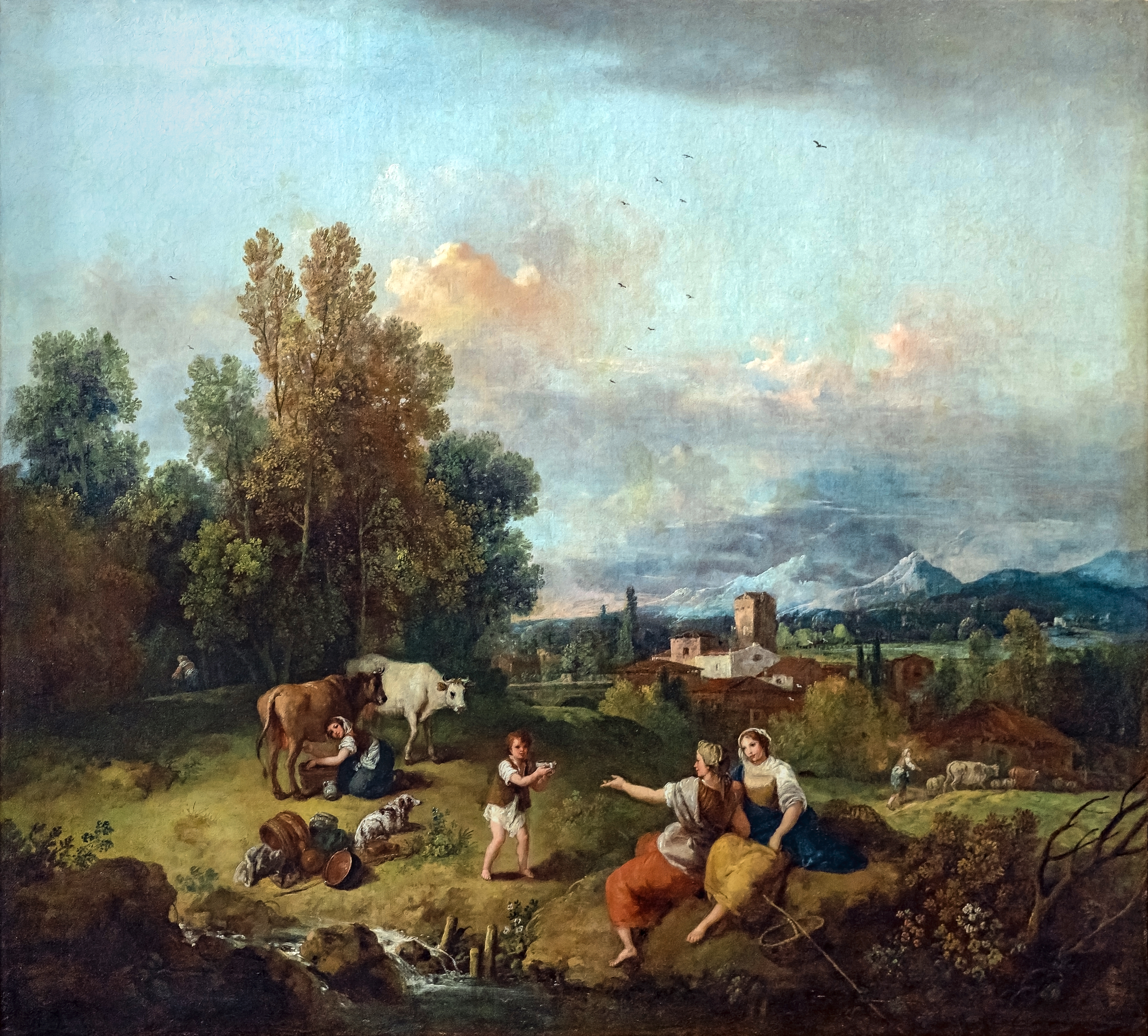
Pastorale. c. 1755. Ca' Rezzonico, Venice.

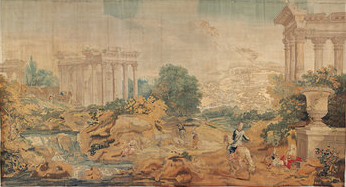
Ruins of Palmyra. Wool and silk tapestry by Paul Saunders, designed by Francesco Zuccarelli. 1758. Victoria and Albert Museum, London.

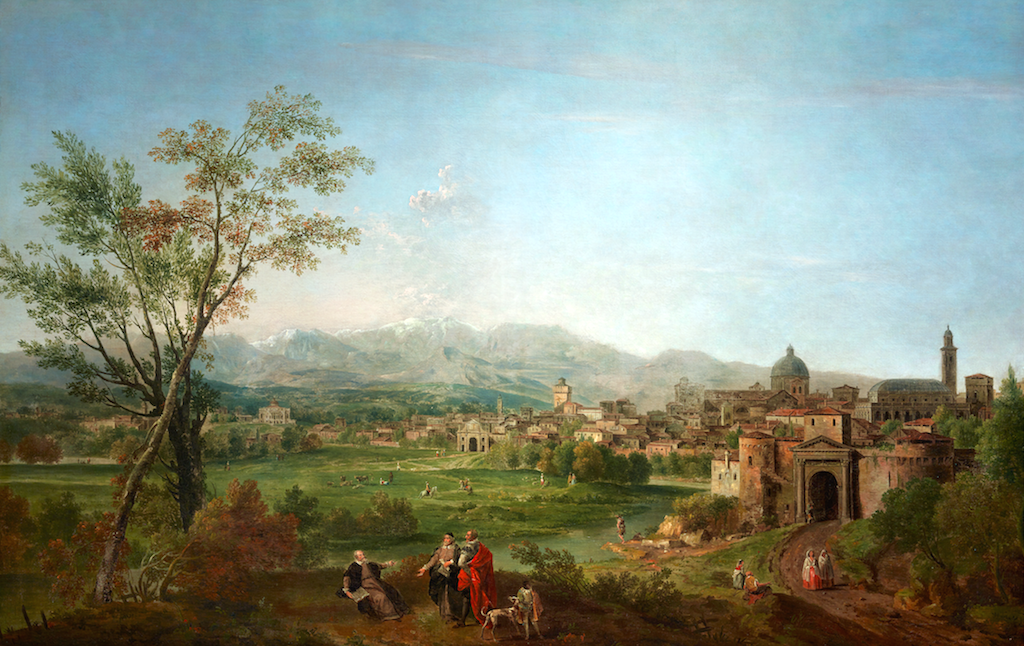
View of Vicenza with Ancient Monuments. c. 1760. Palazzo Leoni Montanari, Vicenza. Intesa Sanpaolo collection.

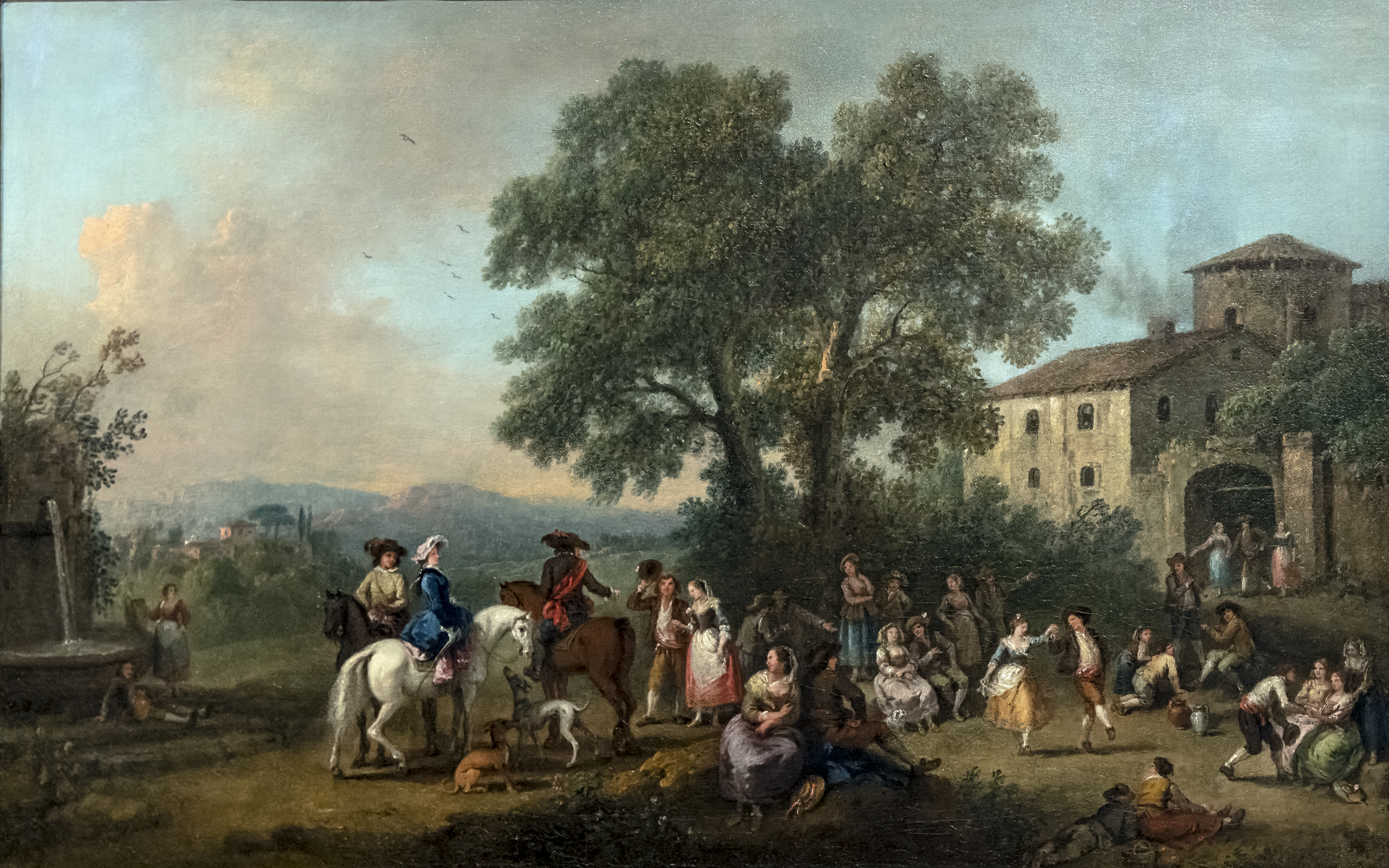
Garden party. After 1762. Fondation Bemberg, Toulouse.

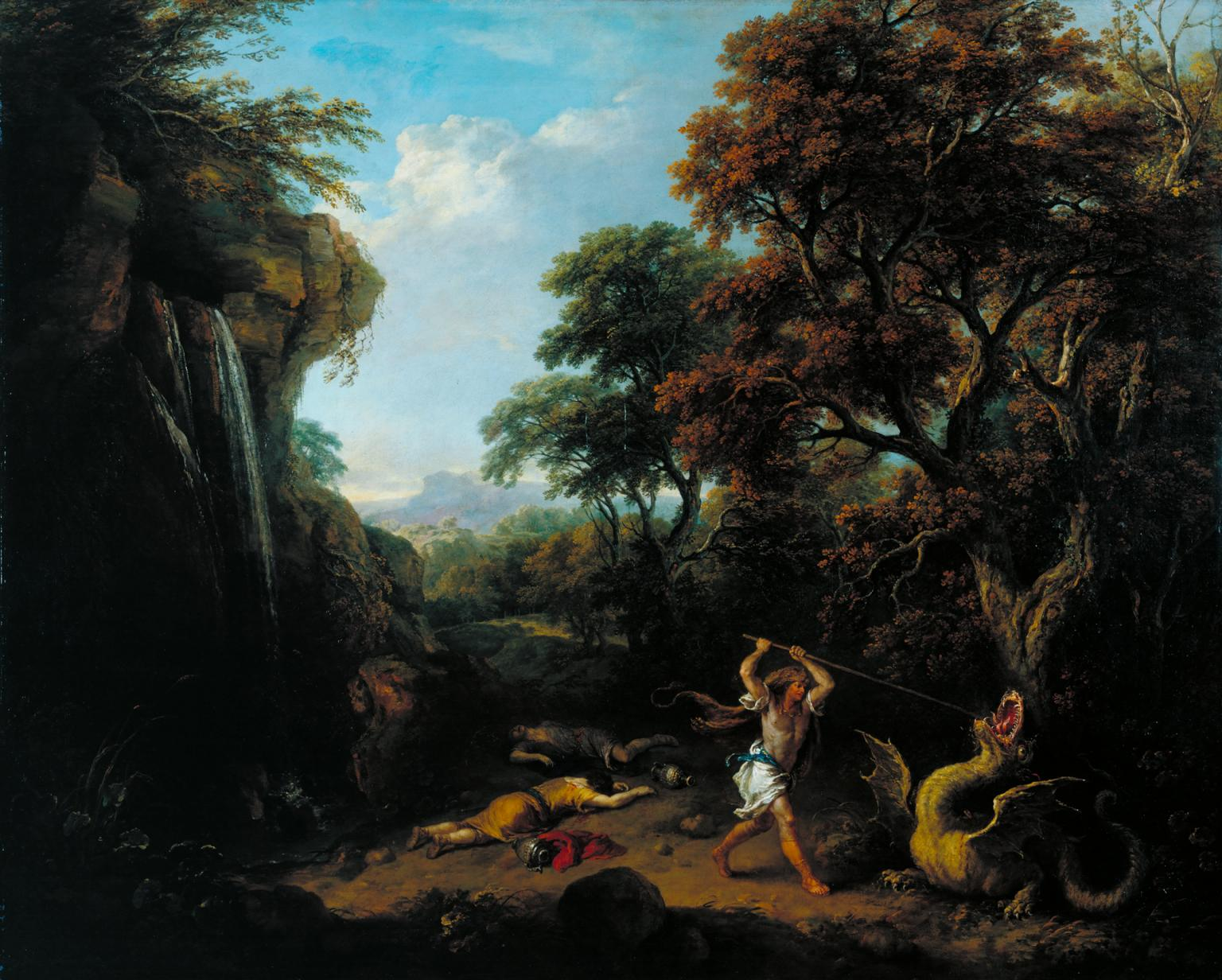
Landscape with the Story of Cadmus Killing the Dragon. Exhibited in 1765. Tate, London. (Note: Exhibited at the Free Society of Artists in 1765, and described by James Barry as an "exceedingly good landscape by Zuccarelli.")

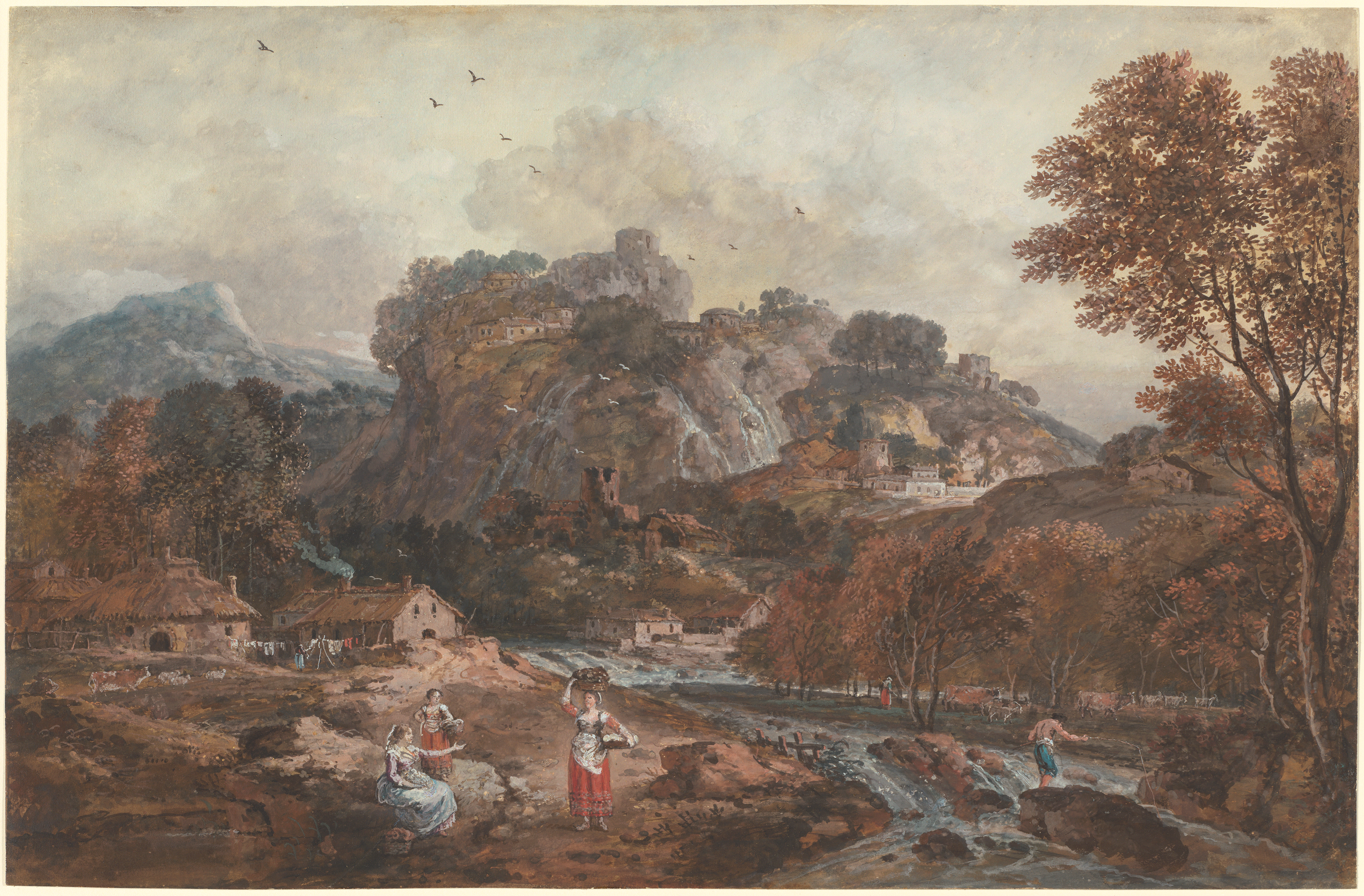
Mountain Landscape with Washerwomen and a Fisherman. c. 1765–8. National Gallery of Art, Washington, D.C. (Note: Gouache over black chalk, laid on modern paper.)

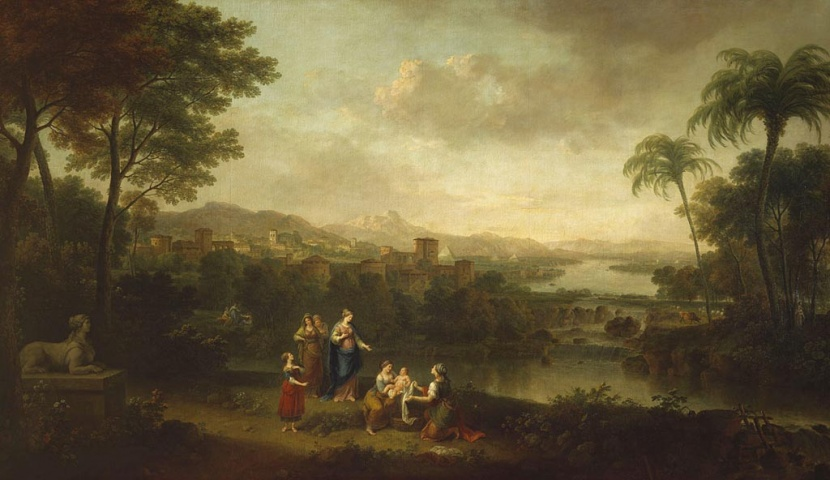
River Landscape with the Finding of Moses. 1768. Windsor Castle, Windsor.

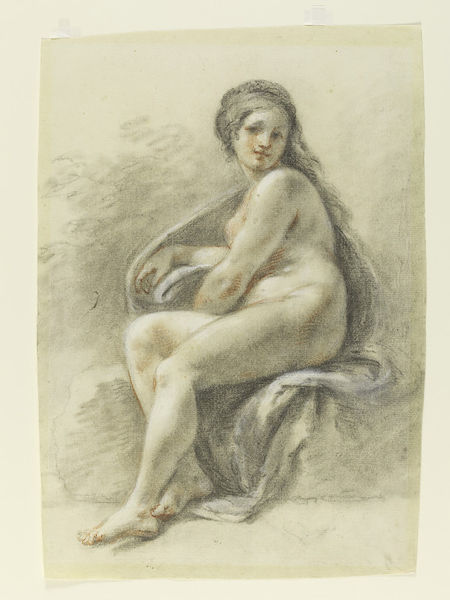
Seated female nude. Before 1769. Victoria and Albert Museum, London. (Note: The drawing comes from one of two albums that belonged to the 18th century English architect, Richard Norris. The album is entitled Sketches Taken in Italy 1769. Theodoli notes that drawings by Zuccarelli were much sought after by English collectors. Charcoal and grey wash, heightened with white body-colour and red chalk, on cream paper.)

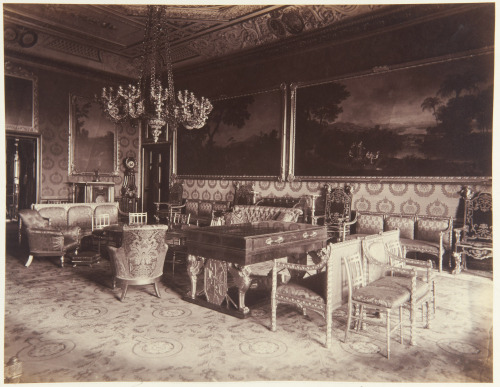
The Zuccarelli Room in 1880, looking South West. Windsor Castle, Windsor. (Note: Two landscapes by Zuccarelli are shown. The photograph shows a Wyatville ceiling, and the paintings overlay wallpaper with a VR motif. Albumen photograph attributed to John Wesley Livingston (1835–1897). The image was commissioned by the Royal Collection for inventory purposes.)

== Sources ==
- Angelo, Henry (1828). Reminiscences of Henry Angelo, with memoirs of his late father and friends, including numerous original anecdotes and curious traits of the most celebrated characters that have flourished during the last eighty years. Vol. I. London: H. Colburn.
- Anon. (1771). Georgian Papers in the Royal Archives at Windsor (historical papers). Windsor Castle, Windsor.
- Biondi, Jean-Pierre, ed. (1991) [10 January 1789]. "Gazzetta Toscana". Francesco Zuccarelli. 1702-1788. Atti dell Onoranze, Pitigliano (in Italian). Florence.
- Cust, Lionel (1913). "Notes on Pictures in the Royal Collections–XXV" [The Italian List]. Burlington Magazine. XXIII.
- Dal Forno, Federico (1994). Francesco Zuccarelli pittore paesaggista del Settecento (in Italian). Verona: Centro per la formazione professionale grafica "San Zeno".
- Ditchfield, P. H.; Page, William, eds. (1923). "A History of the County of Berkshire". British History Online. London: Victoria County History.
- Edwards, Edward; Walpole, Horace (1808). Anecdotes of painters, who have resided or been born in England, with critical remarks on their productions. London: Leigh and Sotheby.
- Gabburri, Franceso Maria Niccolò (1719–1741). Vite de' pittori (unpublished manuscript) (in Italian). Vol. II. Florence: Biblioteca Nazionale Centrale.
- Hargrave, Catherine Perry (1966). Playing Cards and a Bibliography of Cards and Gaming: Compiled and Illustrated from the Old Cards and Books in the Collection of the United States Playing Card Company in Cincinnati. New York: Dover Publications.
- Haskell, Francis (1986). Patrons and Painters: A Study in the Relations between Italian Art and Society in the Age of the Baroque (2nd ed.). New Haven and London: Yale University Press. ISBN 0-300-02540-8.
- Huber, Michel (1803). Catalogue raisonné du cabinet d'estampes de feu Monsieur Winckler banquier et membre du sénat à Leipzig, contenant une collection des pieces anciennes et modernes de l'ecole italienne, dans une suite d'artistes depuis l'origine de l'art de graver jusqu'à nos jours (in French). Leipzig: Breitkopf et Härtel.
- Knox, George (June 1996). "Consul Smith's villa at Mogliano: Antonio Visentini and Francesco Zuccarelli". Apollo. CXLIII.
- Lanzi, Luigi (1792). La storia pittorica della Italia inferiore, o sia delle scuole fiorentina, senese, romana, napolitana (in Italian). Florence: A.G. Pagani.
- Lanzi, Luigi (1795). Storia pittorica della Italia dal Risorgimento delle Belle Arti fin presso la fine del XVIII secolo (in Italian). Bassano: Remondini.
- Levey, Michael (1959a). "Francesco Zuccarelli in England". Italian Studies. XVI.
- Levey, Michael (April 1959). "Wilson and Zuccarelli at Venice". Burlington Magazine. CI: 139–143.
- Levey, Michael (1964). The Later Italian Pictures in the Collection of Her Majesty the Queen. London: Phaidon Press.
- Lippi, Lorenzo (pseud. Perione Zipoli) (1731). Il Malmantile Racquistato (in Italian). Florence: Michele Nestenus and Francesco Moucke.
- Massar, Phyllis Dearborn (September 1998). "The Prints of Francesco Zuccarelli". Print Quarterly. XV.
- Olivier, Michel (1996). "Recherches Biographiques sur Paolo Anesi". Vivre et Peindre à Rome au XVIIIe Siècle (in French). Rome: Palais Farnèse.
- Perini, Giovanni (1998). "Gabburi Francesco Maria Niccolò". Dizionario Biografico (in Italian). Trecanni, La Cultura Italiana. Archived from the original on 11 October 2016.
- Prestage and Hobbs (1762). Pictures, of Mr. Zuccarelli, painted by himself, consisting of variety in landscapes, history. London.
- Pitt, William (1967) [27 December 1804]. "William Pitt to the King". In Aspinall, Arthur (ed.). The Later Correspondence of George III. Vol. Four, 1802–1807. Cambridge University Press.
- Pyne, William Henry (1819). The history of the royal residences of Windsor castle, St. James' palace, Carlton house, and Frogmore. Vol. I. London: A. Dry.
- Sillars, Stuart (2006). Painting Shakespeare: The Artist as Critic, 1720-1820. Cambridge University Press. ISBN 978-0-521-85308-8.
- Smith (?), Joseph (c. 1770). Catalogue of paintings of the Italian school, all in fine preservation, and in carved gilt frames in modern and elegant taste. Bought by His Majesty in Italy, and now chiefly at Kew (manuscript catalogue). Windsor Castle, Windsor.
- Spadotto, Federica (2007). Francesco Zuccarelli (in Italian). Milan: Bruno Alfieri. ISBN 978-88-902804-1-2.
- Spadotto, Federica (2009). "Zuccarelli tra emuli, imitatori e copisti". In Pedrocco, Filippo; Craievich, Alberto (eds.). L'impegno e la conoscenza: studi di storia dell'arte in onore di Egido Martina (in Italian). Verona: Scripta edizioni. ISBN 978-88-96162-13-2.
- Spadotto, Federica (2014). "Francesco Zuccarelli". Paesaggio veneti del '700 (in Italian). Minelliana. ISBN 978-88-6566-050-8.
- Spadotto, Federica (2016). Francesco Zuccarelli in Inghilterra: genesi di un capolavoro (in Italian). Verona: Cierre Grafica. ISBN 978-88-98768-52-3.
- Stowe, Harriet Beecher (1854). Sunny Memories of Foreign Lands. Vol. II. London: Sampson, Lowe, Son & Co.
- Succi, Dario (1986). "Antonio Visentini: l'opera incisa". Canaletto & Visentini: Venezia & Londra, catalogo della mostra a cura di Dario Succi (in Italian). Padua: Citadella.
- Tassi, Francesco Maria (1793). Vite de' pittori, scultori e architetti bergamaschi (in Italian). Vol. II. Bergamo: Locatelli..
- Theodoli, Olimpia (1995). "Francesco Zuccarelli". In Martineau, Jane; Robison, Andrew (eds.). The Glory of Venice: Art in the Eighteenth Century. New Haven: Yale University Press. ISBN 978-0-300-06186-4.
- "The Royal Collection". Royal Collection Trust.
- Zampetti, Pietro (1971). "Zuccarelli Francesco". A Dictionary of Venetian Painters. Vol. 4. Leigh-On-Sea: F. Lewis. ISBN 978-0-85317-181-2.
