= Palazzo Smith Mangilli Valmarana =

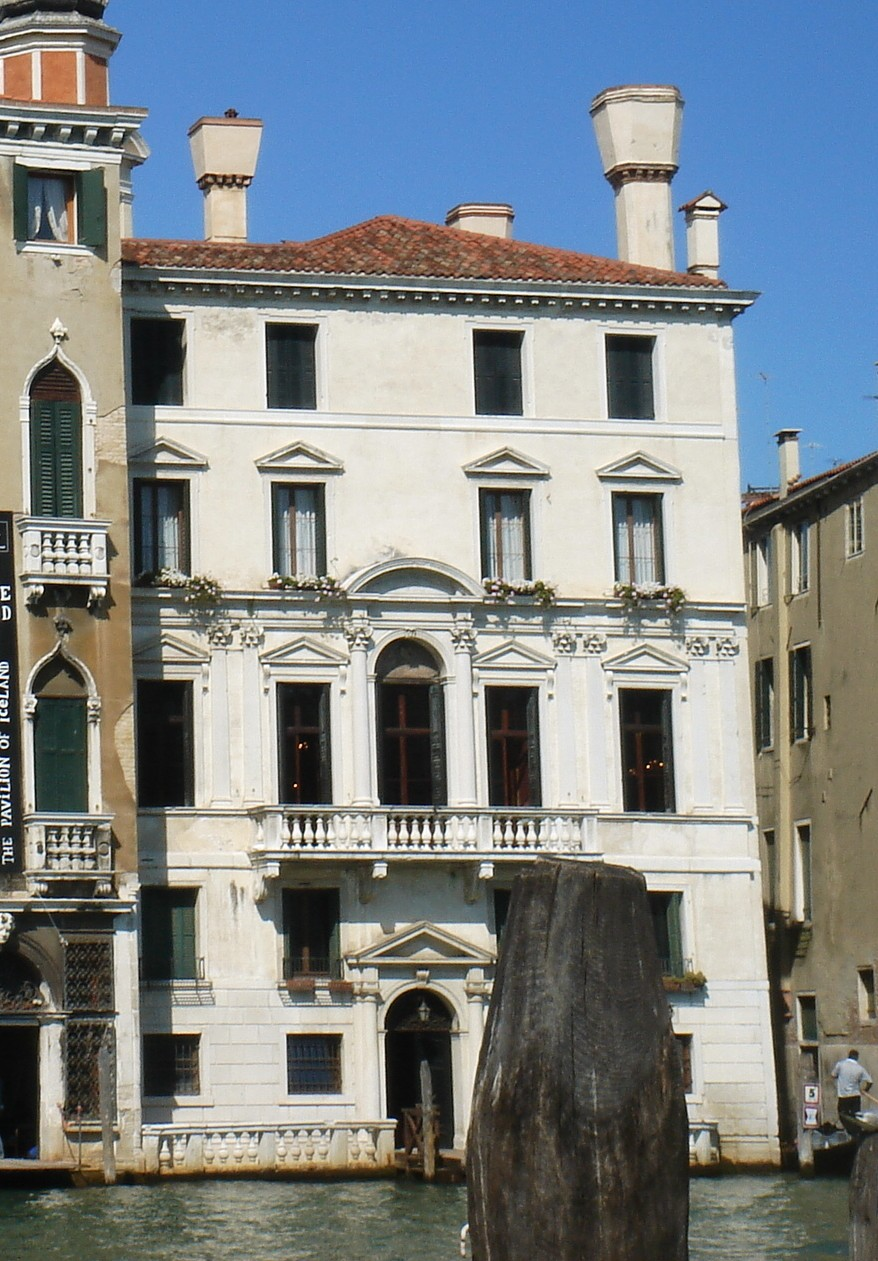
- Palazzo Smith Mangilli Valmarana
- Interactive map of the Palazzo Smith Mangilli Valmarana area

General information
- Type: Residential
- Architectural style: Neoclassical
- Location: Cannaregio district, Venice, Italy
- Coordinates: 45°26′24.29″N 12°20′08.64″E
- Construction started: 18th century

Technical details
- Floor count: 4

Palazzo Smith Mangilli Valmarana is a palace in Venice, located in the Cannaregio district and overlooking the Grand Canal. The neighbouring building is Palazzo Michiel del Brusà.

== History ==
The palazzo is best known for having been the residence of the English consul Joseph Smith, who was Canaletto's agent to sell his paintings to the British customers. Smith bought the palazzo in 1740.

The palace was originally a Gothic Byzantine building, but when it became the seat of the English embassy and the residence of Smith, he altered the structure according to the taste of the time: in 1743, painter and engraver Antonio Visentini designed the new facade; the work lasted until 1751. The new facade only reached the present first noble floor.

In 1784, the palace passed to Count Giuseppe Mangilli, who added the above floors and invited Giannantonio Selva to decorate the interiors. Selva created a luxurious and unified series of rooms in neoclassical style, still perfectly preserved today. Later the palace passed to the Valmarana family from Vicenza.

== Architecture ==
The neoclassical building consists of three floors with mezzanine in the attic. The ground floor has a water portal placed centrally and dominated by a tympanum. Each of the two noble floors has four rectangular windows arranged regularly and divided by pairs of Corinthian pilasters on the first floor, which also offers a central large opening flanked by Corinthian half-columns supporting a larger gable.
