= Giovanni Battista Pasquali =

18th-century Venician printer

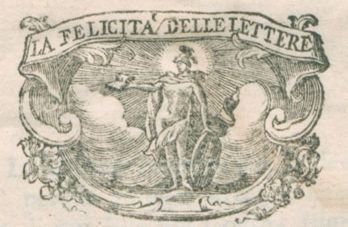
Pasquali's mark (BEIC)

Giovanni Battista Pasquali was a leading printer in 18th-century Venice, supported by the British consul Joseph Smith (1682–1770), a patron and collector. Pasquali was a scholar himself, who published his own essays as well as finely printed, unpretentious editions for a scholarly readership. He signed the Latin preface to his printed catalogue of Smith's distinguished library, Bibliotheca Smithiana, seu Catalogus librorum d. Josephi Smithii (Venice: Pasquali, 1755). Pasquali's peers in the revival of fine printing among the presses of Venice were the editor and connoisseur Giovanni Battista Albrizzi and the political writer and publisher Antonio Zatta.

Giambattista Pasquali's marks

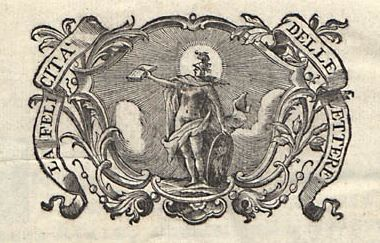

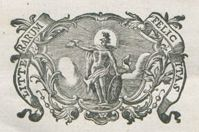

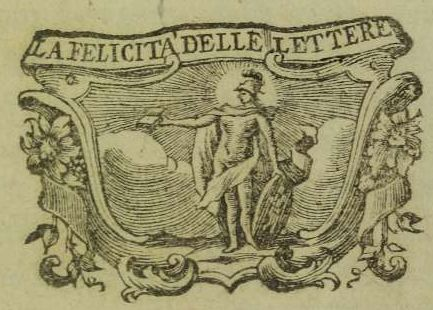

== Bibliography ==
- Minuzzi, Sabrina (2014). "PASQUALI, Giambattista". Dizionario Biografico degli Italiani, Volume 81: Pansini–Pazienza (in Italian). Rome: Istituto dell'Enciclopedia Italiana. ISBN 978-8-81200032-6.
