= Antonio Visentini =

Italian painter (1688–1782)

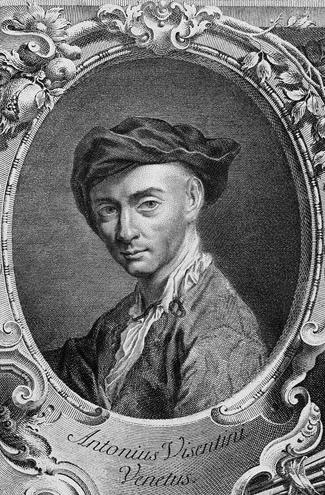
- Self-portrait
- Born: 21 November 1688; Venice
- Died: 26 June 1782 (aged 93); Venice
- Occupation: Architect
- Practice: Accademia di Belle Arti di Venezia
- Design: Palazzo Giusti

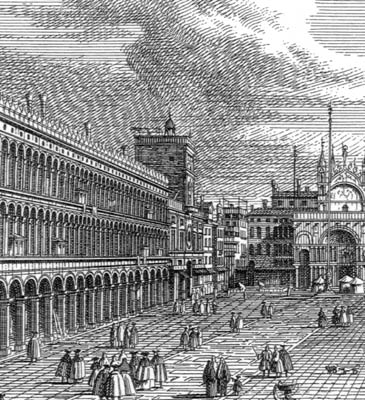
View of Piazza San Marco in Venice, by Antonio Visentini (1742)

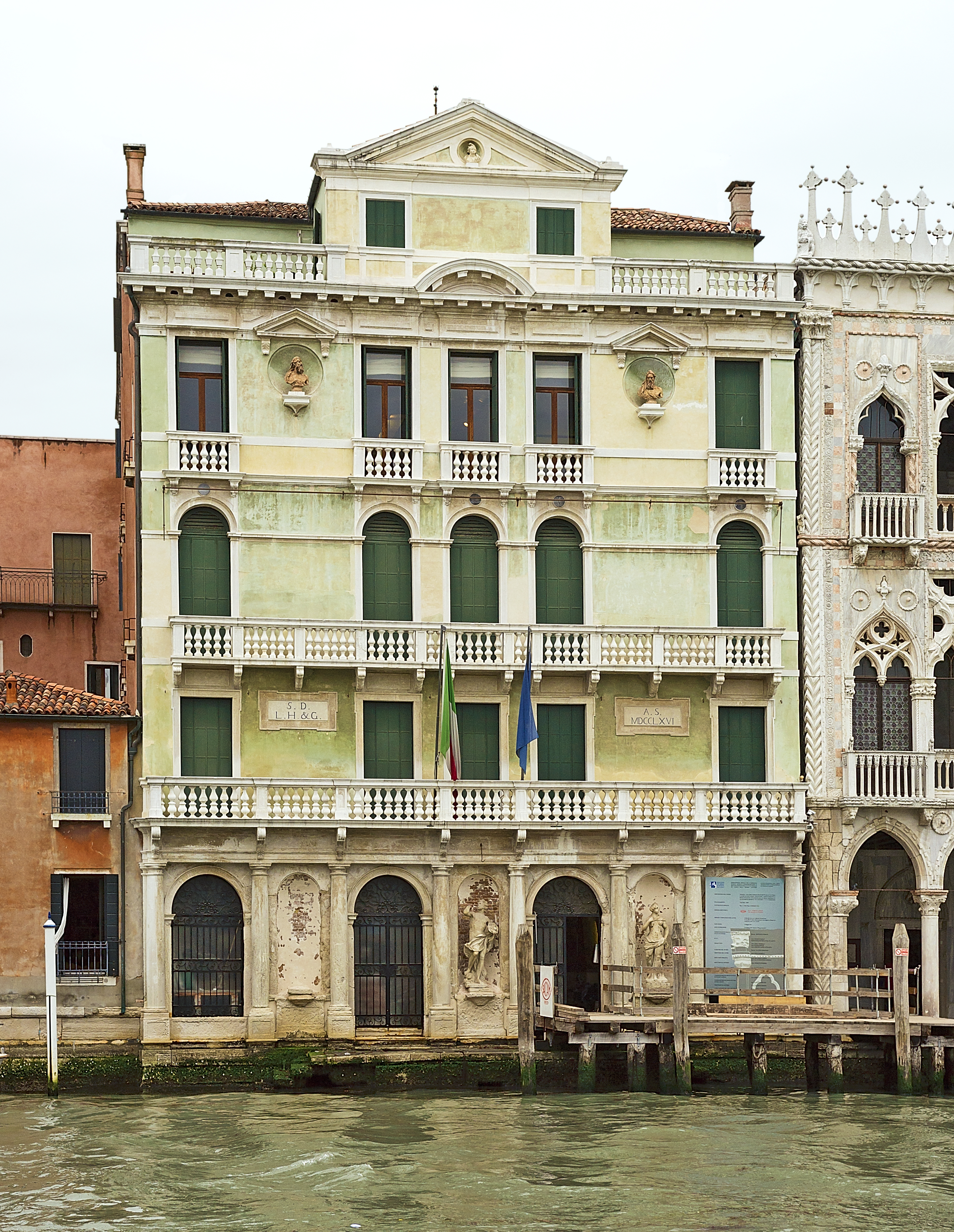
Palace Giusti on Grand Canal in Venice, facade by Antonio Visentini

Antonio Visentini (21 November 1688 – 26 June 1782) was a Venetian architectural designer, painter and engraver, known for his architectural fantasies and capricci, the author of treatises on perspective and a professor at the Venetian Academy.

== Life and works ==
Born in Venice, Visentini was a pupil of the widely travelled Baroque painter Giovanni Antonio Pellegrini, who had painted some decors in English country houses at the beginning of the 18th century. Visentini is best known today as the engraver for Canaletto's first great series of Venetian vedute published under the title Urbis Venetiarum Prospectus Celebriores ex Antonii Canal, organised by British resident Joseph (Consul) Smith (1682–1770). The series was begun around 1728 and by the time it was completed in 1735, thirty-eight etchings and engravings had been printed.

On the Grand Canal, Visentini was commissioned to redesign the façade of the residence of Consul Smith, the Palazzo Smith Mangilli Valmarana. He collaborated with Francesco Zuccarelli on capriccios based on English Palladian villas, again for Consul Smith; some have passed with Smith's collection to the British Royal Collection. In Vicenza, Visentini painted frescoes at the Villa Valmarana, for which Gian Domenico Tiepolo painted the figures. In the 1760s the English architect James Wyatt studied with him as an architectural draughtsman and painter.

Visentini's work, the Osservazioni, published in Venice in 1771, was intended as a complement and an extension of a treatise by Teofilo Gallacini (1564–1641), which concerned itself with the errors of Mannerist and early Baroque architecture. Visentini's engravings in the Osservazioni illustrate his proposed modifications correcting Baroque architectural details.

Visentini taught at the Accademia di Belle Arti in Venice from 1772 until 1778, and he died in Venice in 1782.

== Gallery ==
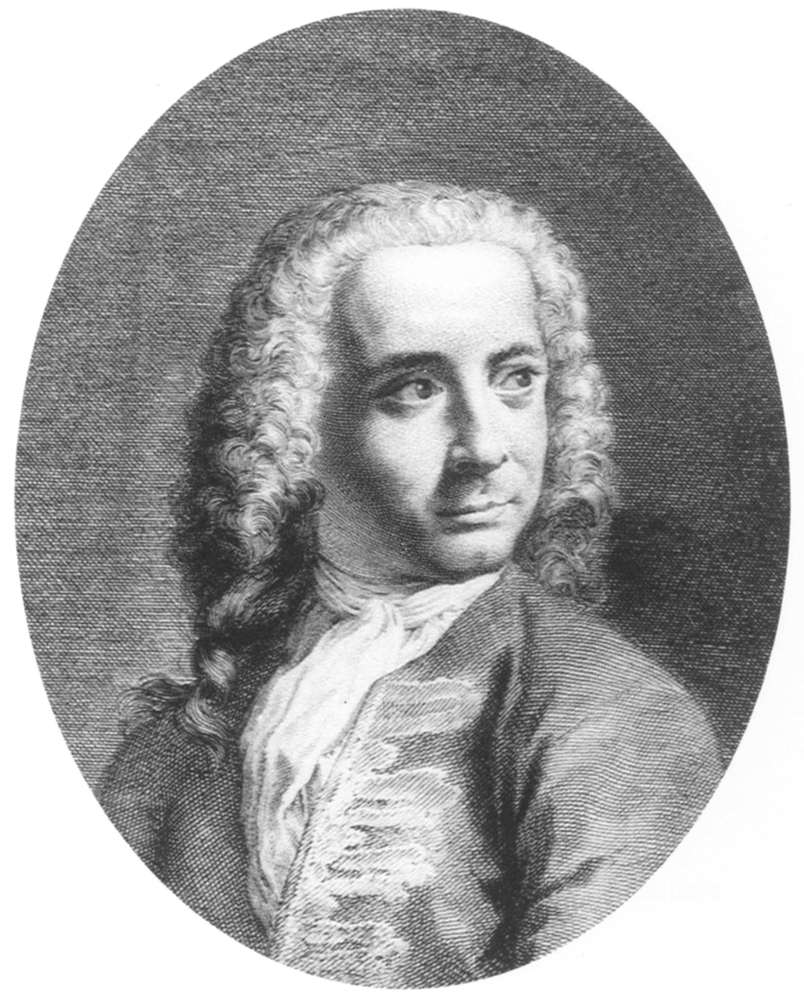
Portrait of Giovanni Antonio Canal, called Canaletto

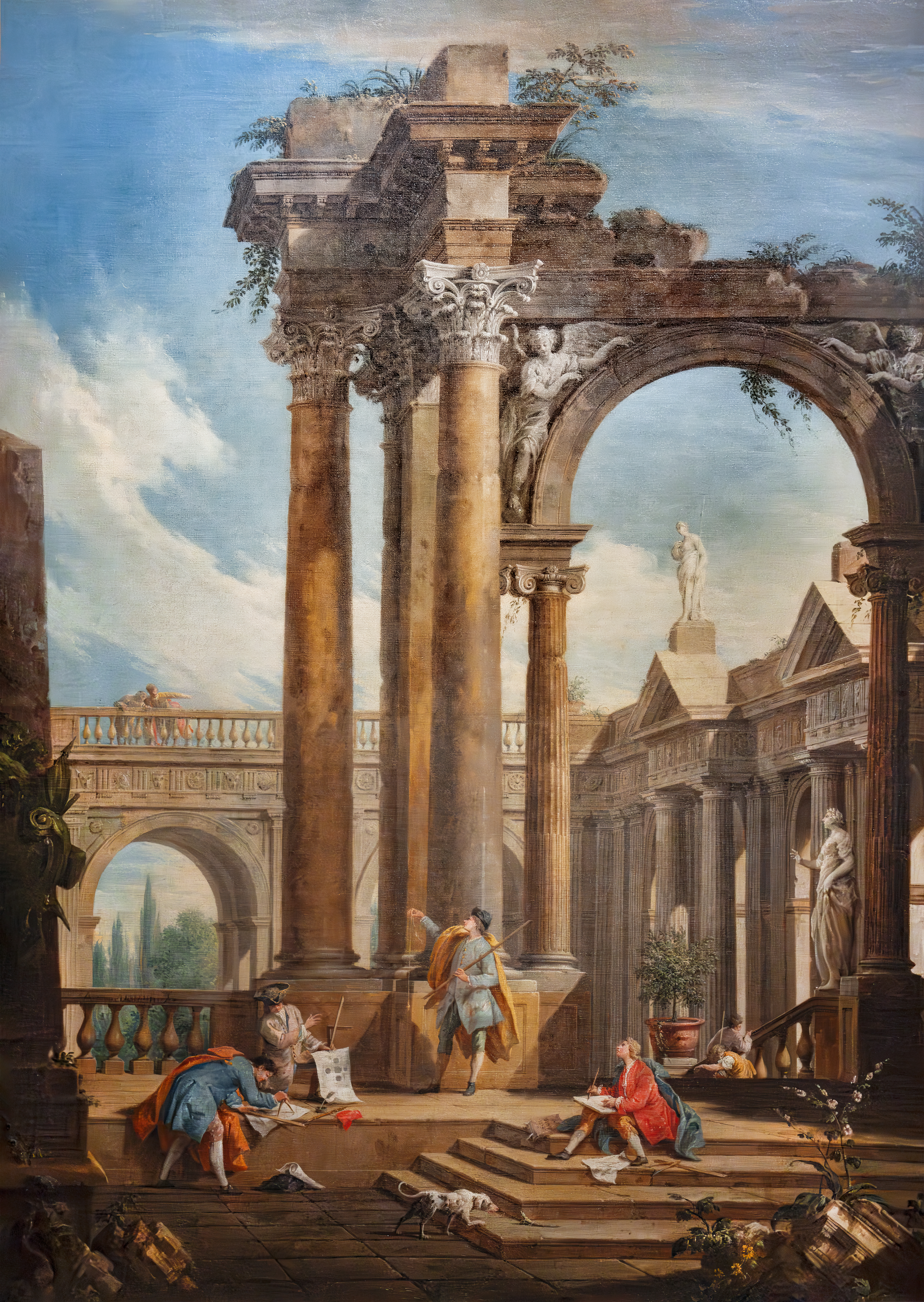
Architectural fantasy Gallerie dell'Accademia

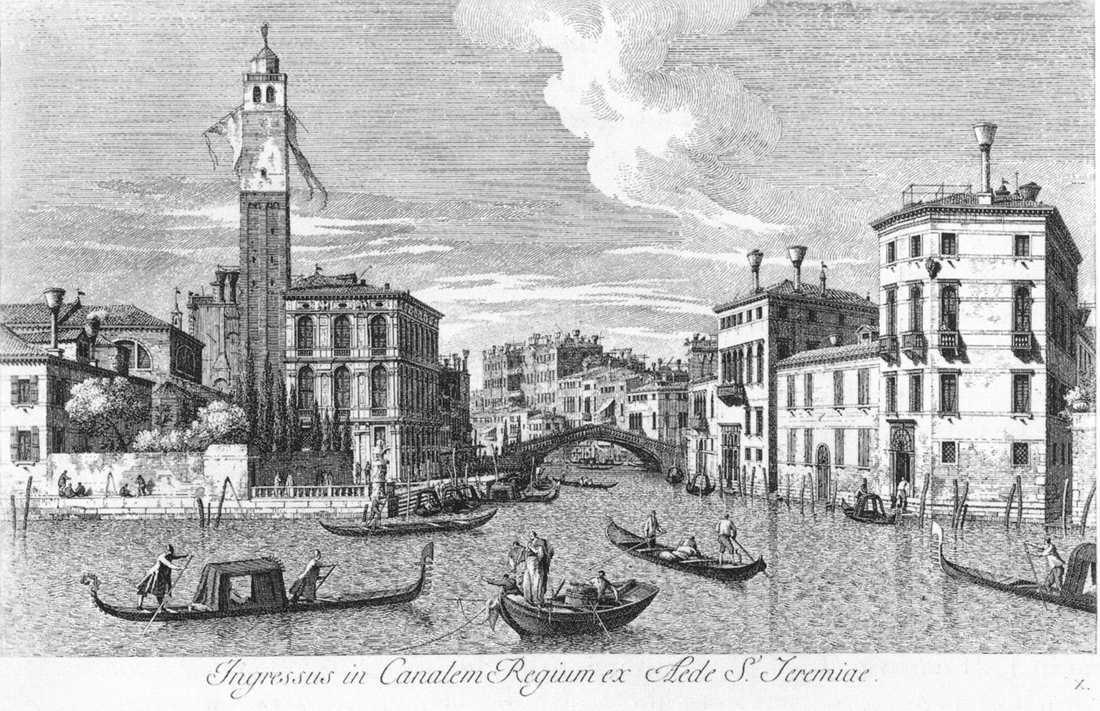
San Geremia and the Entrance of Cannaregio

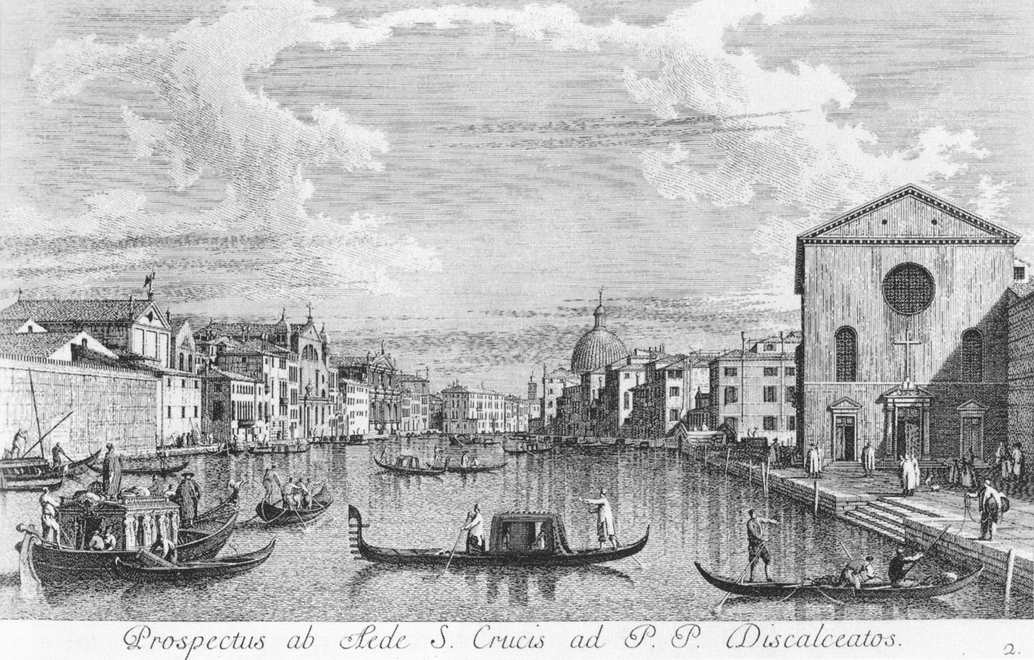
The Grand Canal from Santa Croce to the East

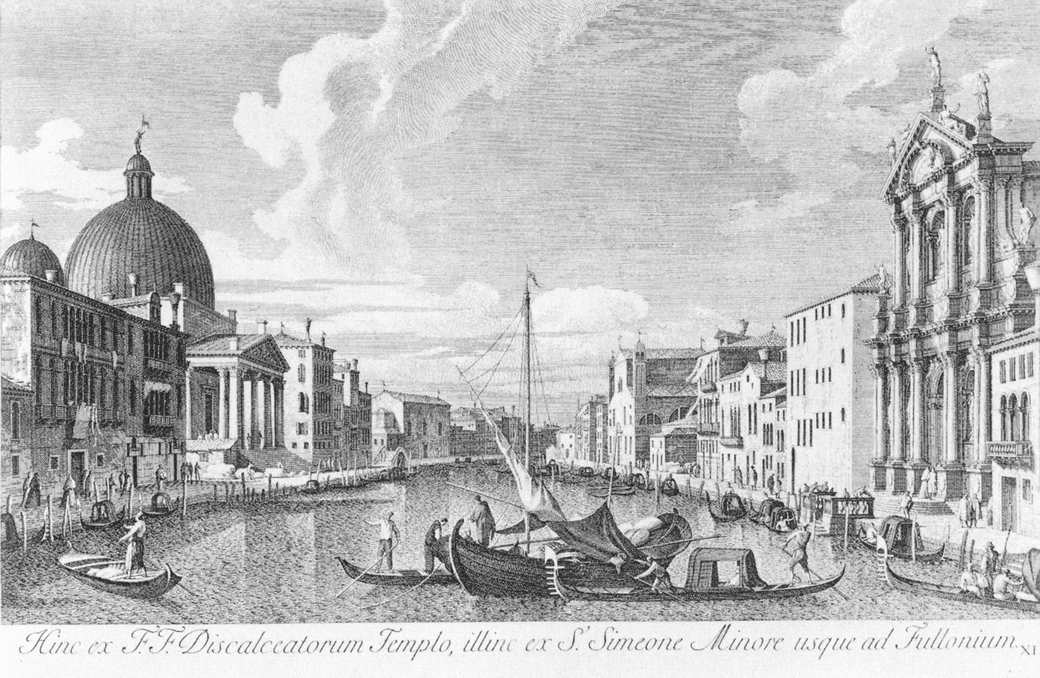
The Grand Canal with San Simeone Piccolo and the Scalzi

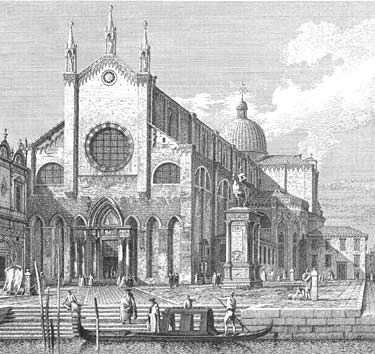
The Basilica di San Giovanni e Paolo

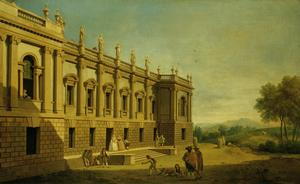
Antonio Visentini and Francesco Zuccarelli, Burlington House

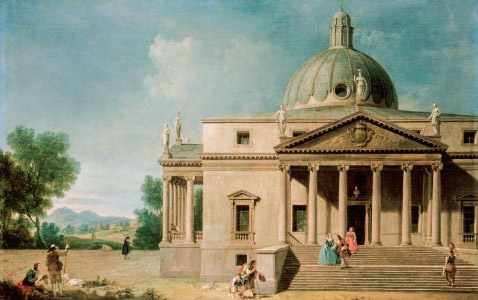
Antonio Visentini and Francesco Zuccarelli, Mereworth Castle

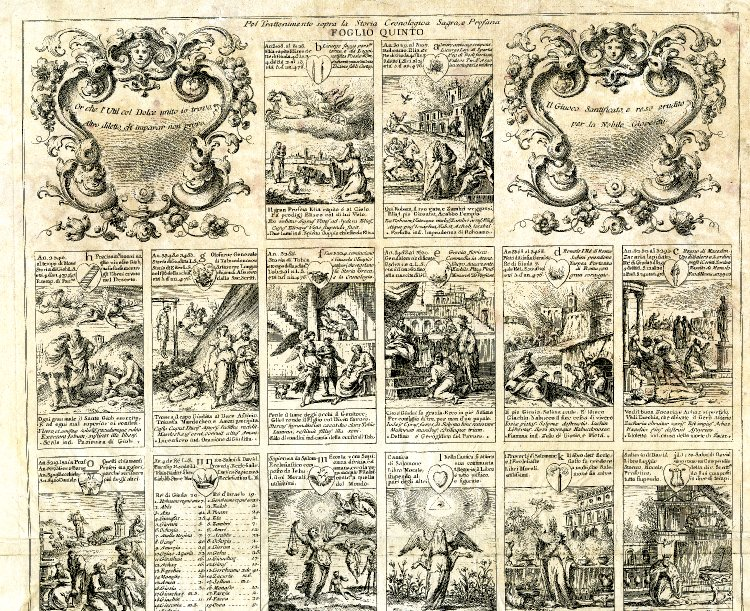
Antonio Visentini after Francesco Zuccarelli, Old Testament Playing Cards
