= Charles Wild =

English painter (1781–1835)

Charles Wild (1781–1835) was an English watercolour artist, known as a specialist in architecture.

== Life ==
Born in London, England, he was articled young to Thomas Malton, and concentrated on architectural subjects from the outset of his career. In 1803, Wild began to exhibit in the Royal Academy. On 15 February 1809, he was elected an associate of the Old Watercolour Society, becoming a full member on 8 June 1812. He soon gave up his membership, but then was re-elected on 12 February 1821; he was treasurer in 1822, and then secretary in 1827 until 1832 when Robert Hills took over.

In 1827, Wild's sight began to fail, and in 1832 he became blind. He died on 4 August 1835 at 35 Albemarle Street, Piccadilly, where he had lived since 1820. His children included the architect James William Wild.

== Works ==
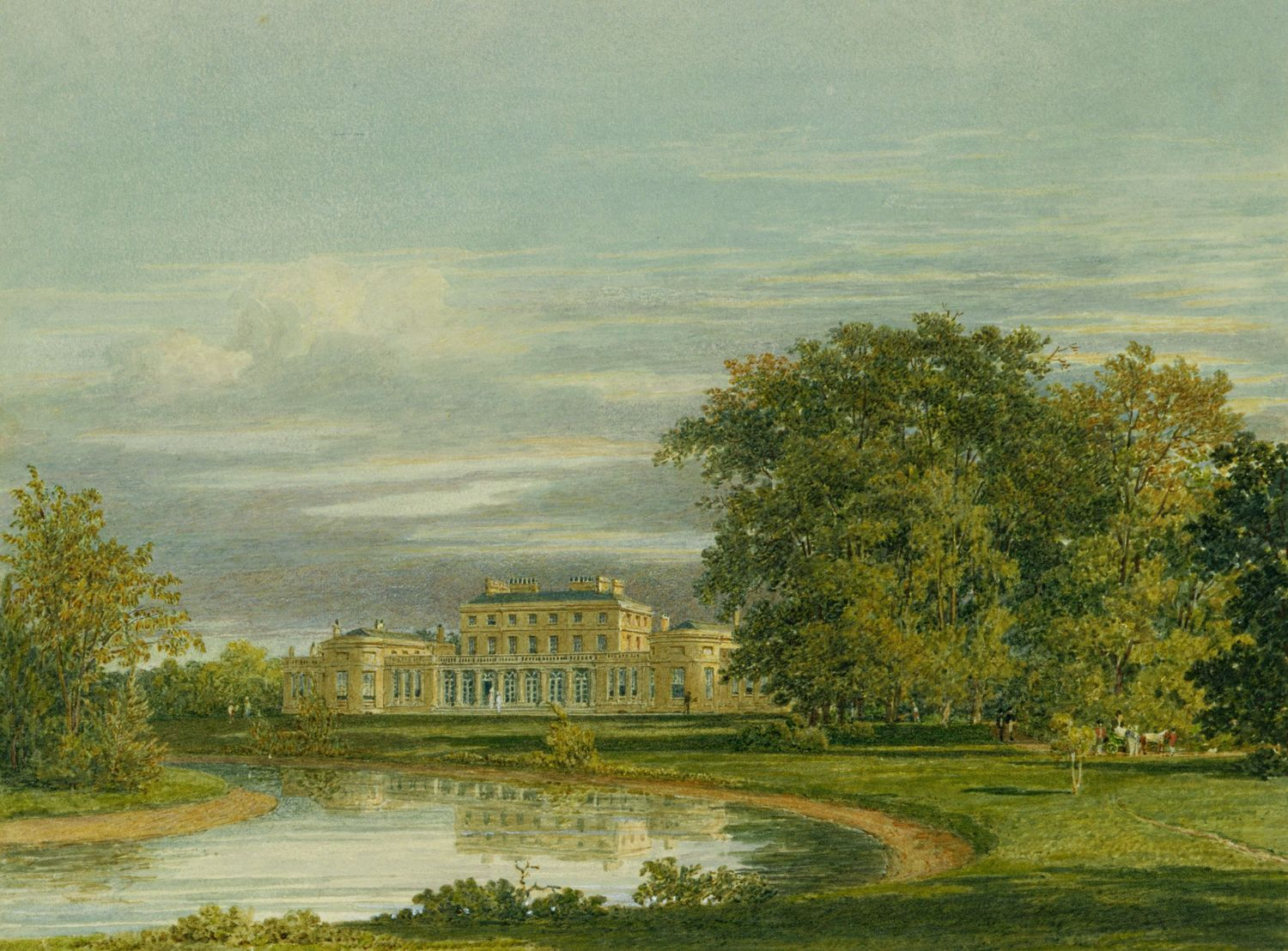
Frogmore House, Garden Front, watercolour by Charles Wild, 1819

Wild's earliest exhibited works from 1803 were two views of Christ Church, Oxford, followed in 1805 by drawings of Westminster Abbey, and in 1808 of York Cathedral. He published six series of works on English cathedrals: Canterbury (1807); York (1809); Chester (1813); Lichfield (1813); Lincoln (1819) and Worcester (1823).

The illustrations that Wild supplied for William Henry Pyne's Royal Residences (published 1819) were reproduced, after the style of Rudolph Ackermann's Microcosm of London, as hand-coloured aquatints.

Travels on the continent resulted in Wild's Examples of the Ecclesiastical Architecture of the Middle Ages chiefly in France, and a volume published in 1833 of sketches in Belgium, Germany, and France. A miscellaneous collection, entitled Twelve Beautiful Specimens, from the Cathedrals of England, lacked a date. Architectural Grandeur appeared in 1837, consisting of continental sketches that were etched by John Le Keux and others.

== Notes ==
Attribution

This article incorporates text from a publication now in the public domain: Lee, Sidney, ed. (1900). "Wild, Charles". Dictionary of National Biography. Vol. 61. London: Smith, Elder & Co.
