= Joseph Smith (art collector) =

British diplomat and art collector (c. 1682–1770)

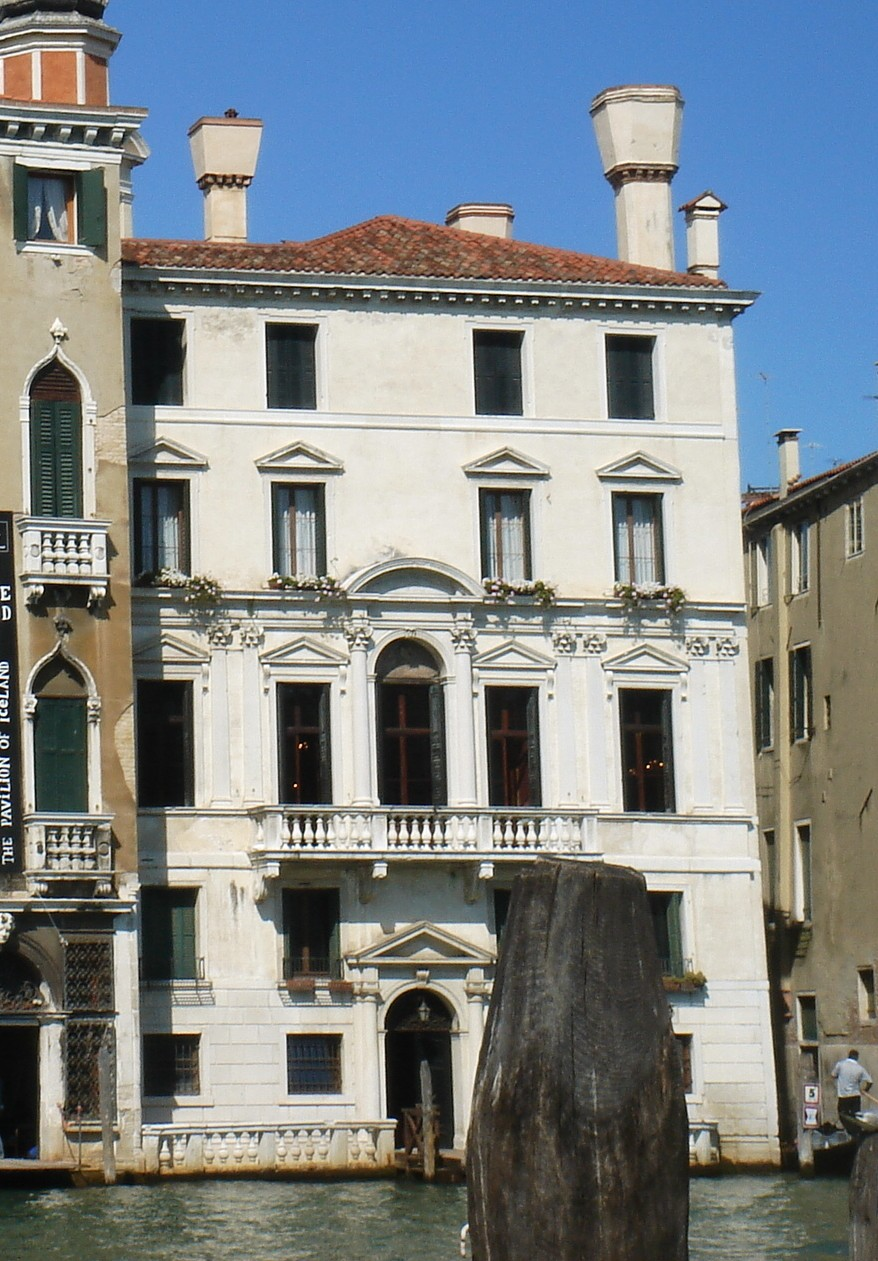
Palazzo Smith Mangilli Valmarana

Joseph Smith (c. 1682 – Venice, 6 November 1770), often known as Consul Smith, was the British consul at Venice from 1744 to 1760. He was a patron of artists, most notably Canaletto, a collector and connoisseur, banker to the British community at Venice, and a major draw on the British Grand Tour. His collection of drawings was bought for George III of Great Britain and forms a nucleus of the Royal Collection of drawings in the Print Room at Windsor Castle.

== Smith the collector ==
Joseph Smith, a man of obscure origins, was educated at Westminster School before travelling to Venice. He took up residence there in 1700 in the import-export trade and merchant banking house of Thomas Williams, the British consul at that time. Smith eventually headed the partnership of Williams and Smith and made a modest fortune.

Smith's reputation was as a passionate collector of paintings and drawings – both of sixteenth- and seventeenth-century masters and of living artists – and of manuscripts and books, coins and medals, and engraved gems. Beside Canaletto, among the living painters whom he patronised were Francesco Zuccarelli, of Florence, and the Venetian Giuseppe Zais. Smith's favoured architect for rebuilding the façade of his palazzo was Antonio Visentini.

== Smith and the Pasquali press ==
It was Smith's pleasure to issue lavishly printed books in extremely limited editions, for which he had the services of Giovanni Battista Pasquali, whose press he bankrolled. A reproduction of Boccaccio's Decamerone from the Pasquali press, guided by Smith, was so exact a facsimile of the rare edition of 1527 that only close examination tells them apart. A Catalogue Librorum Rarissimorum was in fact a partial catalogue of the outstanding rarities in Smith's own library; the first edition consisted of twenty-five copies. A second edition (1737) adds thirty-one titles. A general catalogue of his library was published in 1755.

== Smith's patronage ==
Smith's central role in the network of patronage of painters in eighteenth-century Venice, in which he created a market in the taste for vedute, was as the prime facilitator of purchases made by the British aristocrats passing through on the Grand Tour. As the agent for Canaletto for several years (circa 1729–35), he virtually controlled the artist's output, to the benefit of both. It was Smith who arranged for Visentini to engrave thirty-eight of Canaletto's views in 1730, and Smith who encouraged the artist to make his successful trip to London in 1746.

Smith himself was a passionate collector of contemporary Venetian paintings and drawings, as well as etchings and engravings. In 1768, he published a facsimile of the original edition of Andrea Palladio's I quattro libri dell'architettura of 1570.

In 1762, Smith sold the vast majority of his books, gems, coins, prints, drawings and paintings – including many works by Canaletto – to the young George III for £20,000. The books today form the nucleus of the King's Library, now transferred from the British Museum to the British Library, while the Royal Collection retains his other treasures.

== Musical Smith ==
Smith's other passion was for music, which he indulged in part by marrying the noted but temperamental soprano Catherine Tofts (c.1685–1756). She had been the first true prima donna in London, who had introduced Italian opera in Thomas Clayton's Arsinoe, Queen of Cyprus (1705), the first Italian-style opera heard in England, and Bononcini's Trionfo di Camilla (1706). She arrived in Venice in 1711, and Smith immediately made her his wife.

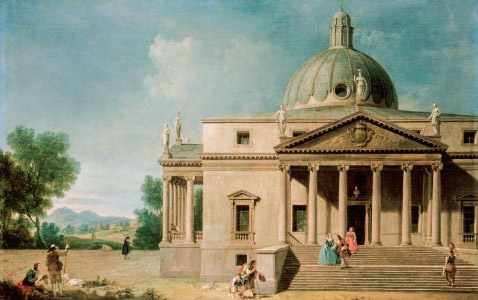
Capricco of Mereworth Castle (cropped at right), by Antonio Visentini and Francesco Zuccarelli, commissioned by Consul Smith, 1742 (Royal Collection)

== "Consul" Smith ==
His appointment as British consul was gazetted on 24 March 1743, Old Style (1744 by modern dating), after which he was the "Consul Smith" whose name appears in every history of eighteenth-century British collecting and art patronage. He retained the post until the accession of George III in 1760. In expectation of his appointment Smith purchased outright the Palazzo Balbi on the Grand Canal, which he had heretofore been renting, on 20 April 1740. Soon thereafter he commissioned Antonio Visentini to redesign the façade in the Palladian style. Smith, who was in correspondence with the "architect earl", Lord Burlington, was as devoted to Palladio as any of his British visitors: in the 1740s he asked Canaletto (whose agent he had been for many years) to paint the principal buildings by Palladio in Venice. A production of the Pasquali press was a facsimile of Andrea Palladio's Quattro libri dell'Architettura, as it had been printed in Venice, 1570, but presented as an eighteenth-century bibliophile felt it ought to have been printed in the first place, on fine paper with generous margins and engravings substituted for the original woodcuts. Further neo-Palladian structures in a veduta ideata fantasy setting commissioned by Consul Smith are the series of eleven paintings commissioned in 1746 from Francesco Zuccarelli and Antonio Visentini showing English Palladian structures in idealised fantasy settings.

== Dispersing the collections ==
George III began to form his library by purchasing Smith's in virtually its entirety in 1765, for £10,000; it forms that part of the British Library known as the "King's Library". Smith did not stop collecting; the dispersal of his second collection of books by auction in London took thirteen days in January–February 1773.

Many of Smith's paintings also went to the British Royal Collection, through the mediation of James Smart Mackenzie, brother of Lord Bute. The collection is celebrated for its dazzling series of Venetian views by Canaletto, together with other Italian views by Canaletto and works by Sebastiano Ricci, Francesco Zuccarelli and Pietro Longhi. On a more workaday level, there are numerous architectural drawings of sixteenth-century architecture at Venice and at Vicenza made in the studio of Antonio Visentini that are scaled in British feet and must have been intended for some British milordo.

A generous selection of his manuscripts were purchased by Lord Sunderland for the library at Blenheim Palace, which was dispersed in turn during the nineteenth century.

== Legacy ==
At quite an advanced age, the widowed consul Smith, his wife having died in 1756, married a sister of John Murray, resident at Venice and afterwards British ambassador to Turkey. His grave was on the Lido, where Goethe, travelling in the late seventeen-eighties, stopped to pay respects: "to him I owe my copy of Palladio, and I offered up a grateful prayer".

The palace that Smith owned in Venice is now known as Palazzo Smith Mangilli Valmarana. Smith's summer villa in the terraferma was at Mogliano Veneto; it does not survive.
