= Giusti (surname) =

House of Giusti (1715)
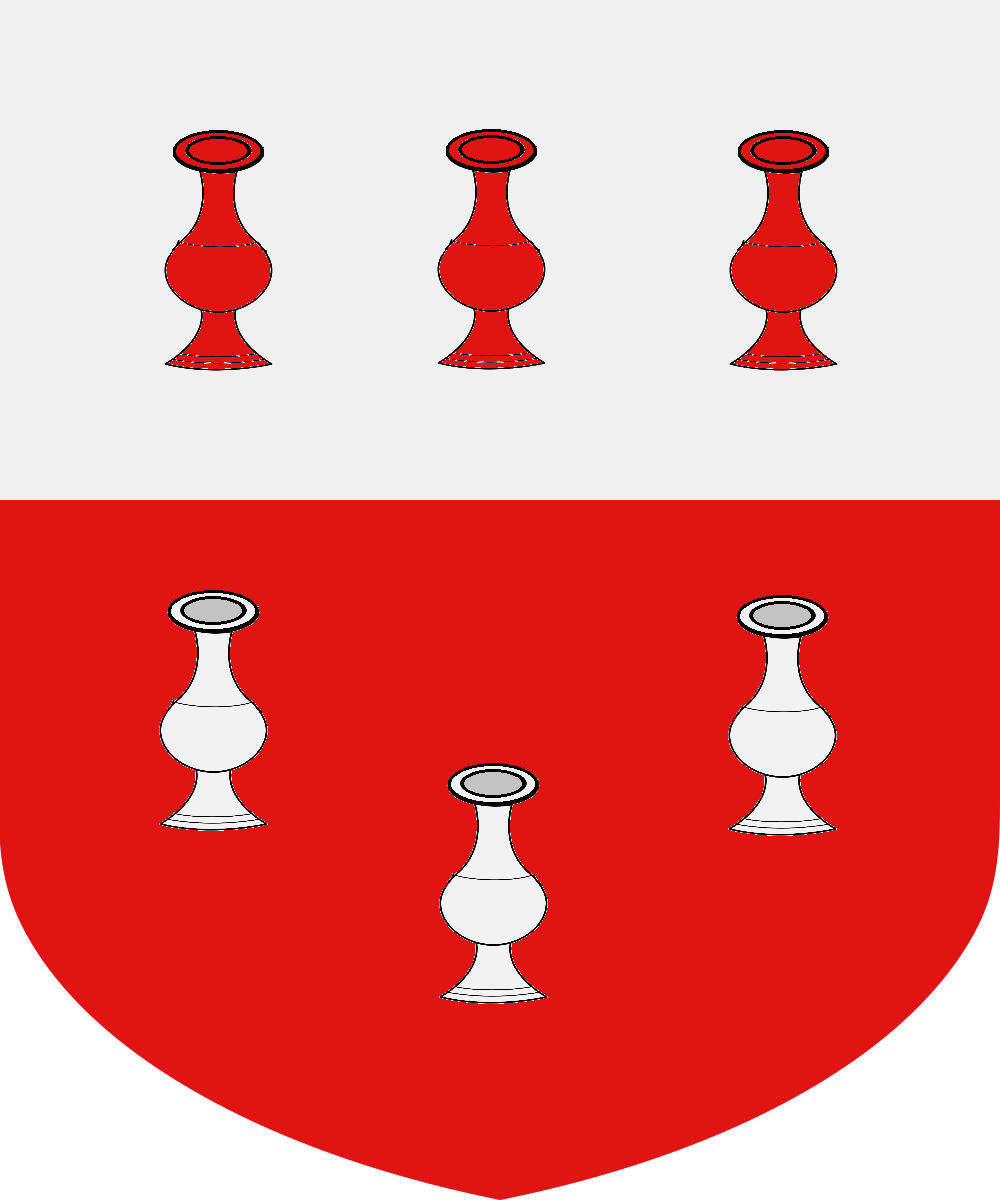
- 1715 -- Arms for the House of Giusti in argent on gules, six weights in the form of vases without handles from one to the other, 3 by 3.

House of Giusti (1715)
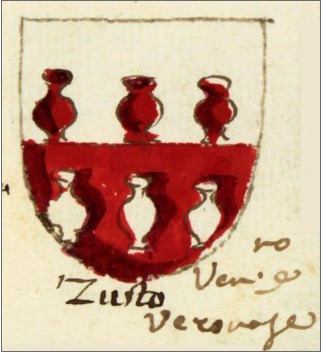
- 1715 -- Arms for the House of Giusti from the library at the University of Modena.

House of Giusti (After 1650)
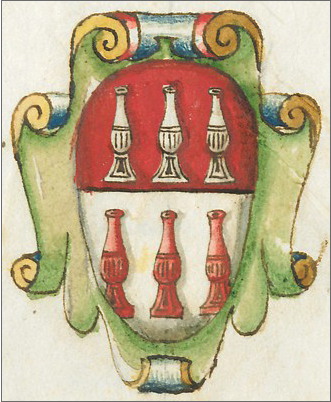
- 1650 -- Arms for the House of Giusti from the library at the University of Modena.

House of Giusti (1650)
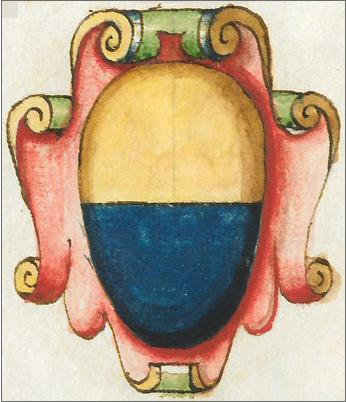
- 1650 -- Arms for the House of Giusti from the library at the University of Modena.

House of Giusti (1500)
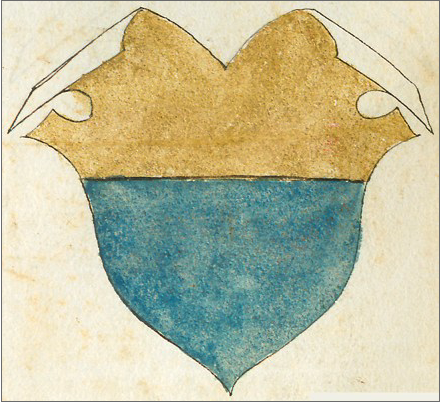
- 1500 -- Arms for the House of Giusti from the library at the University of Modena.

Giovanni Battista Giusti of Colle Val D'Elsa coat of arms
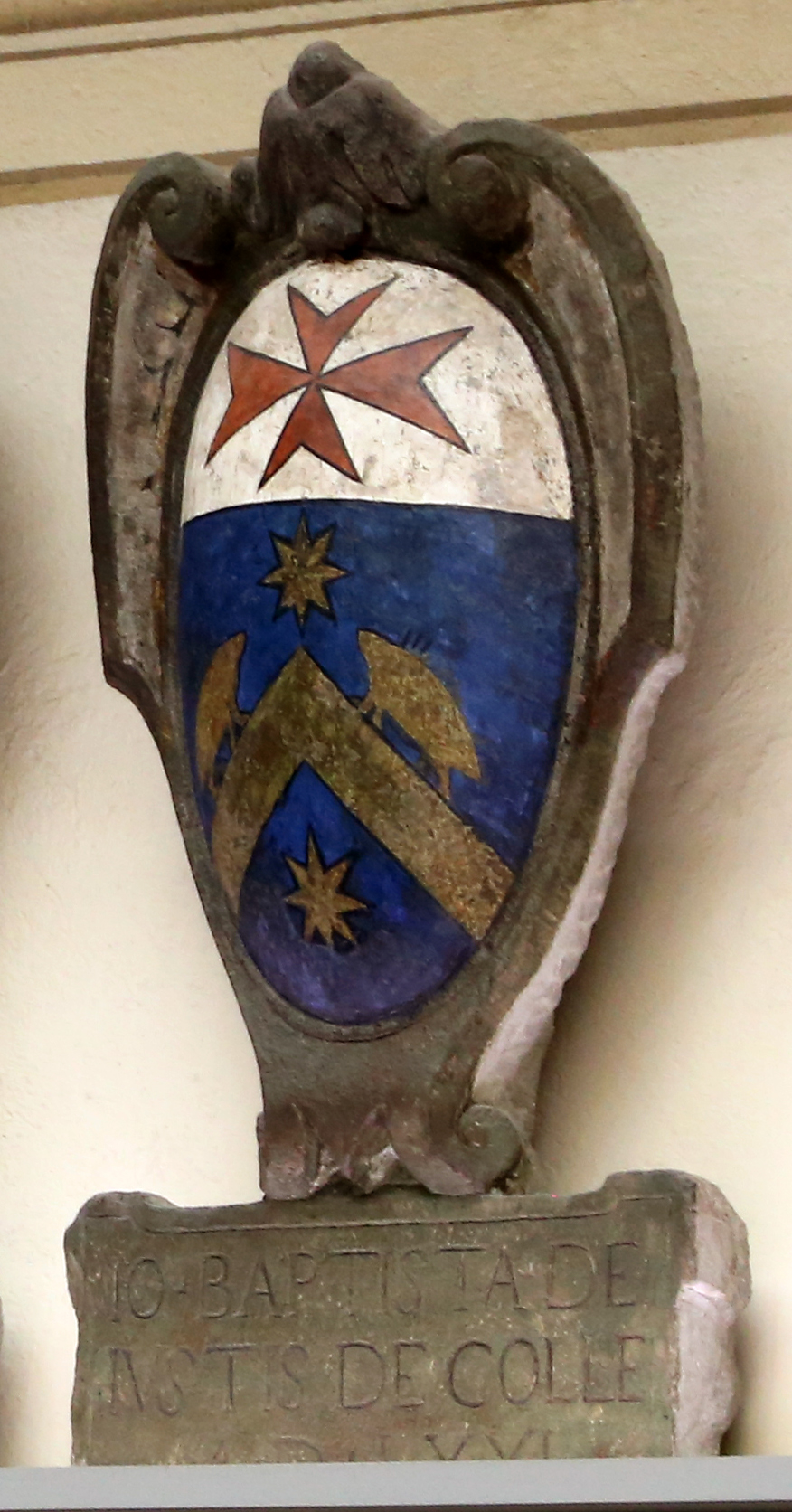
- Coat of arms for Giovanni Battista Giusti di Colle Val D'Elsa from 1571, found in Palazzo della Caravan (Pisa).

Giusti is an Italian surname.

== Variations ==
- Iustis in Latin
- Zufto/Zusto in Venetian
- Giusto/Giusti in Italian
- de' Giusti / de Giusti / De Giusti -- The "de" particle is used as the nobiliary particle. Note the writing at the bottom of Giovanni Battista Giusti's coat of arms found in the Palazzo della Caravan on the image in the side. In the partial writing of the name, it is written as "... Baptista De Iustis De Colle ...".
- Giusti del Giardino
- Giusti or Juste in French
- Justo in Spanish

== Origin ==
- Originally came from Colle di Valle d'Elsa.
- Migrated to Florence where, in addition to citizenship, they were entrusted with distinguished charges and functions.
- Around this time, there is also a migration to Padua.
- In 1141 they then moved to Venice and were integrated into the Venetian nobility as a patrician family.
- They played a part in the election of Orio Mastropiero.
- However, the family was excluded at the closing of the Maggior Consiglio.
- Around 1311, Gumberto or Gomberto de Giusti migrates to Verona at the time of Cangrande I della Scala.
- Lelio Giusti becomes the Podestà of Florence and Ambassador to the Doge Pasquale Malipiero.
- Lorenzo Giusti reinstated their nobility, when they were excluded from the Maggior Consiglio, after the war in Genoa.
- In 1502 the Venetian Republic, under Leonardo Loredan, grants them Dukedoms.
- They receive the title of Counts of the land and castle of Gazzo.
- In 1600 the title was confirmed by Emperor Rodolfo II.
- In 1611 they were elected Roman citizens in the order of patricians and Senators.
- In 1615 Giacomo Giusti was one of the four captains of the Venetian militia enlisted by the Republic on occasion of disturbances in Italy.
- In 1620 they obtained the confirmation of the ancient nobility with the title of Counts of Gazzo and Venetian patricians.

== Geographical distribution ==
Broken down by Giusti and de Giusti.

=== Giusti ===
As of 2014, 61.8% of all known bearers of the surname Giusti were residents of Italy (frequency 1:2,776), 13.8% of Brazil (1:41,500), 7.6% of the United States (1:133,747), 6.9% of Argentina (1:17,375) and 4.4% of France (1:42,362).

In Italy, the frequency of the surname was higher than the national average (1:2,776) in the following regions:

1. Tuscany (1:339)
2. Emilia-Romagna (1:1,964)
3. Abruzzo (1:2,265)
4. Marche (1:2,318)
5. Lazio (1:2,520)

=== de Giusti ===
As of 2014, 71.3% of all known bearers of the surname de Giusti were residents of Italy (frequency 1:75,409), 16.5% of Argentina (1:227,359), 3.7% of Brazil (1:5,097,008), 2.5% of France (1:2,372,240), 2.0% of Venezuela (1:1,313,221), 1.9% of Australia (1:1,227,077), 1.1% of Canada (1:3,070,466), and 0.3% of United States (1:120,819,644).

In Italy, the frequency of the surname was higher than the national average (1:75,409) in the following regions:

1. Friuli-Venezia Giulia (1:10,265)
2. Veneto (1:15,740)
3. Lazio (1:17,799)

== Palaces ==
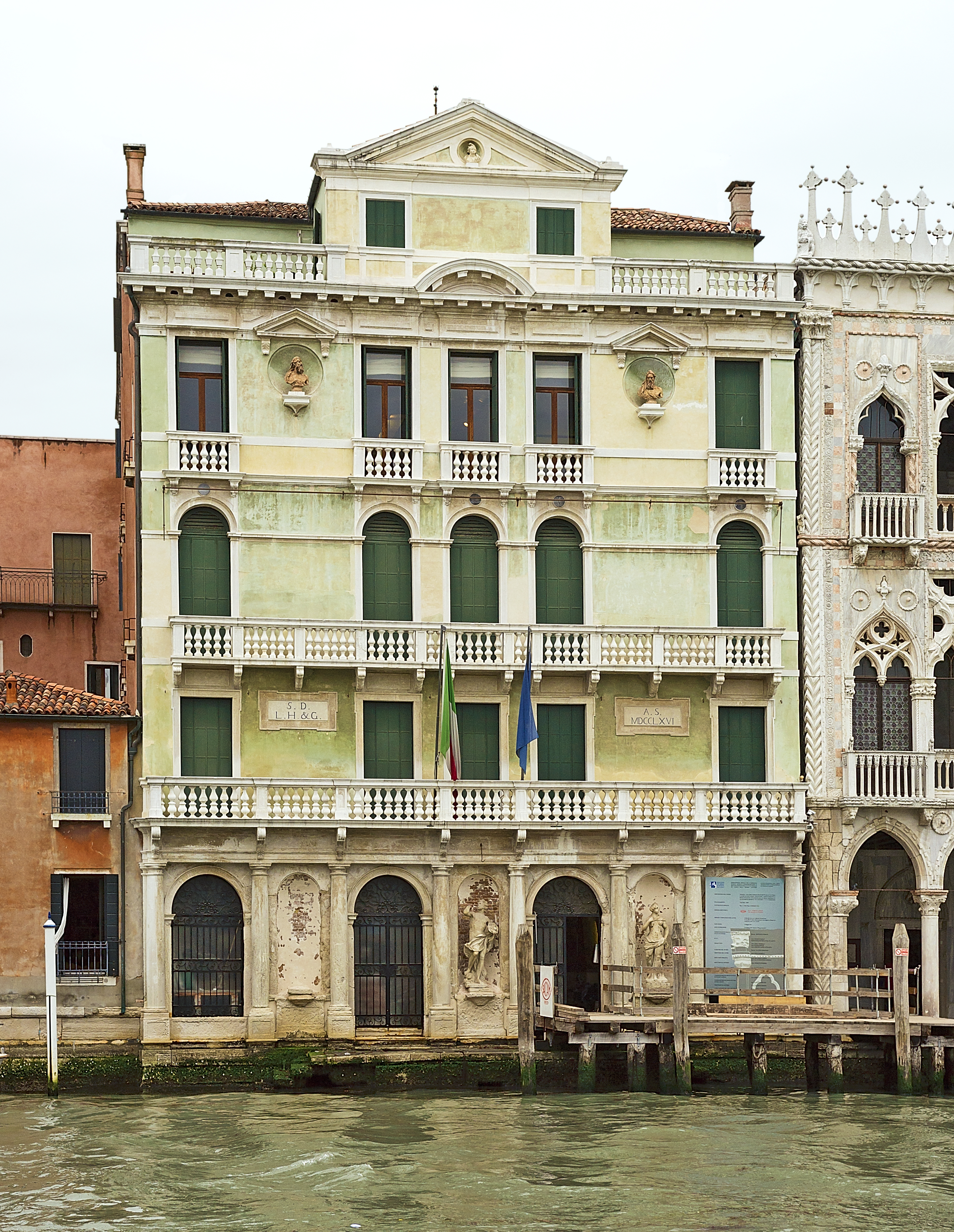
The Palazzo Giusti, located on the Canal Grande of Venice, was built in 1766.

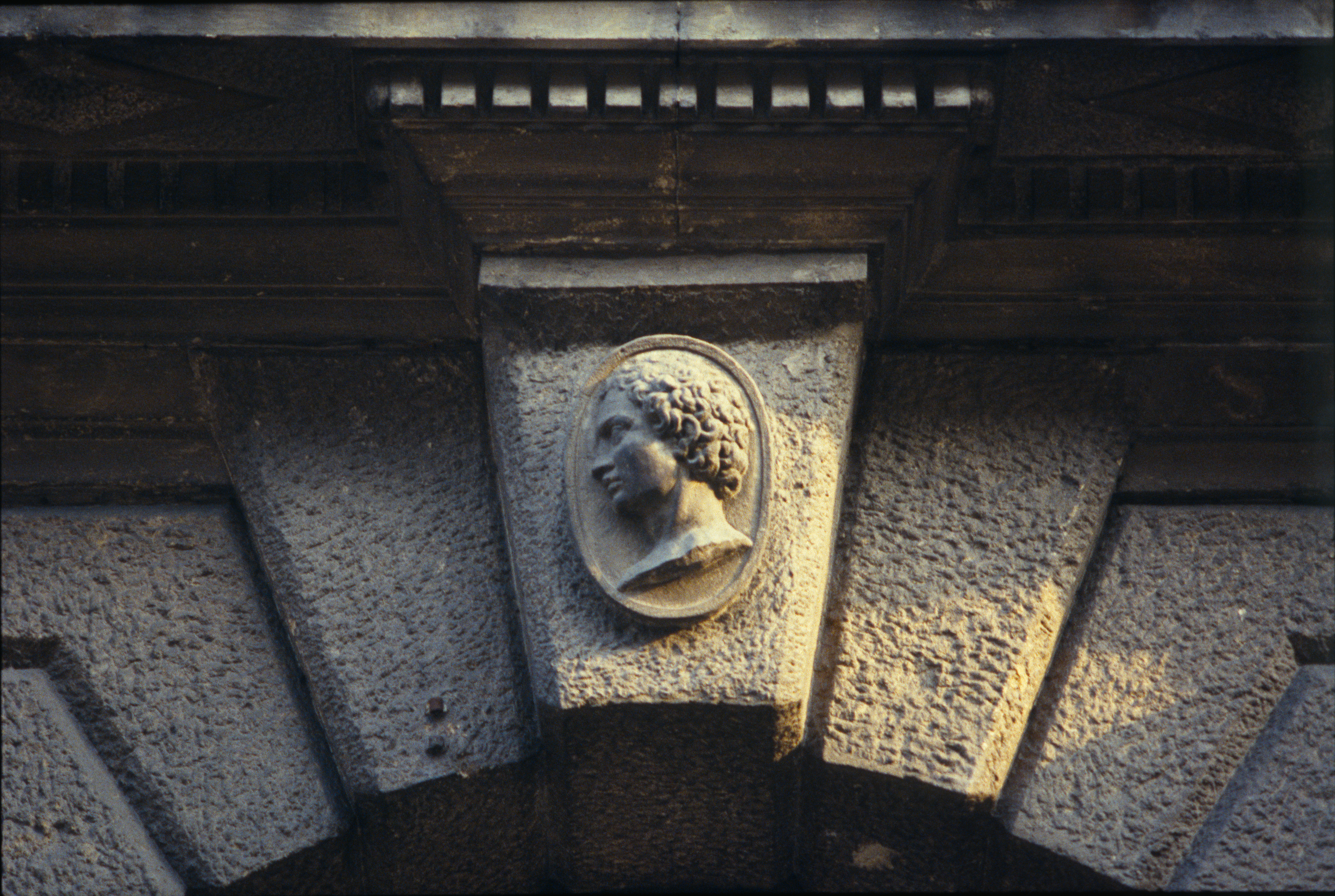
Main entrance Giusti's Palace keystone, with rustic quoins and face of man

- Palace of Miana Colette Giusti in Venice
- Palace of Giusti in Verona
- Villa Giusti del Giardino in Padua

== People ==
14th century

- Gomberto or Gumberto de Giusti (1311)
- Dondedeo de' Giusti (1343), Italian consular of Caffa for the Republic of Genoa

15th century

- Lelio Giusti (1458), Podestà of Florence

16-18th century

- Agostino Giusti (1548–1615), Italian diplomat in the service of the Medici and the Republic of Venice
- Antonio Giusti (1624–1705), Italian painter
- Giacomo Giusti (1615), one of four captains of the Venetian militia enlisted by the Republic on occasions of disturbances in Italy
- Giovanni Battista Giusti (16th century), Italian scientific-instrument maker
- Alvise Giusti (1709–1766), Italian lawyer, poet, and opera librettist
- Girolamo Giusti (1703 – ?), Italian opera librettist
- Luigi (Alvise) Giusti (1709–1766), Italian lawyer, poet, and librettist, nephew of Girolamo Giusti
- His Excellency, the Baron de Giusti (1802), an Italian Baron in Genoa who corresponds with Napoleon

19-21st century

- Giuseppe Giusti (1809–1850), Italian poet and satirist
- Antonino Russo Giusti (1876–1957), Italian dramatist
- Guglielmo Giusti (born 1937), Sammarinese former sports shooter
- Renato Giusti (born 1938), Italian racing cyclist
- Dave Giusti (1939–2026), American Major League Baseball pitcher
- Enrico Giusti (1940–2024), Italian mathematician and historian
- Paolo Giusti (1942–2020), French actor
- Roberto Giusti (1953/1954–2025), Venezuelan journalist
- Ricardo Giusti (born 1956), former Argentine footballer
- Kathy Giusti (born 1958), American health care entrepreneur, president of the Multiple Myeloma Research Foundation
- Timothy D. DeGiusti (born 1962), United States District Judge of the United States District Court for the Western District of Oklahoma
- Walter De Giusti (1962–1988), Argentine spree killer
- Stéphane Giusti (born 1964), French director and actress
- María Elena Giusti (born 1968), Venezuelan synchronized swimmer
- Max Giusti (born 1968), Italian comedian, cabaret artist, impersonator, television presenter, radio personality, actor, voice actor and playwright
- Bernard De Giusti (born 1972), French former rugby union player
- Jenilca Giusti (born 1981), Puerto Rican singer, songwriter and actress commonly known as Jenilca
- Maximiliano Giusti (1991–2016), Argentine football player
- Carlos Eduardo Bendini Giusti (born 1993), Brazilian professional football defender
- Alessandro Giusti (born 2006), French racing driver
- Karin Giusti, Italian sculptor and installation artist
- Silvia Giusti, former Argentine Senator for Chubut Province

== Companies ==
- Miari & Giusti is an Italian automobile brand, founded in Padua in 1894.
- De Giusti Orgoglio is an Italian company in San Vendemiano (TV) that sells prosecco and coffee.
