= Giusti =

Giusti may refer to:

- Giusti (surname)
- Armistice of Villa Giusti, armistice that ended warfare between Italy and Austria-Hungary on the Italian Front during World War I
- Palazzo Giusti and Garden located in the east of Verona, Italy
- Palazzo Giusti, Venice, Neoclassic-style palace located on the Canal Grande of Venice, Italy
- Villa Giusti or Villa Giusti del Giardino, villa in Mandria, outside of Padua in northern Italy
- L'ispettore Giusti, 1999 Italian television series
