= Fantacchiotti =

Fantacchiotti is a surname. Notable people with the surname include:

- Cesare Fantacchiotti (1844–1922), Italian sculptor
- Odoardo Fantacchiotti (1811–1877), Italian sculptor
