= Agostino Giusti =

Italian diplomat

Agostino Giusti (29 September 1548, Verona - March 1615, Verona) was an Italian diplomat in the service of the Medici and the Republic of Venice. He was also a notable patron of the arts and gardening.

== Life ==
Agostino Giusti was the son of Pier Francesco Giusti. His family owned the county of Gazzo Veronese near Verona. Agostino had two children by his wife Alda Malaspina, namely Giovanni Giacomo and Isabella. After his wife's death, he also had two illegitimate children (Laura and Antonio) from a relationship with a servant. In 1570 he started building the Giardino Giusti on a hillside ten minutes from the city centre - it was visited in 1611 by the English traveller Thomas Coryat, who called it "a second paradise".

Venice sent him on several diplomatic missions, and he also hosted the Medici family in his home, as well as accompanying them on several major journeys. In 1567, he entered the Académie philharmonique de Vérone, two years after it set itself up in the house at San Vitale in Verona, owned by the Giusti family. In 1583, he became sole heir to that house and its gardens and ejected the Accademia before moving in himself. Also in 1583, he set up his own 'Ridotto Letterario', a salon at his home to speak informally about literature and philosophy.
