= Juste de Juste =

Italian sculptor (c. 1505 – c. 1559)

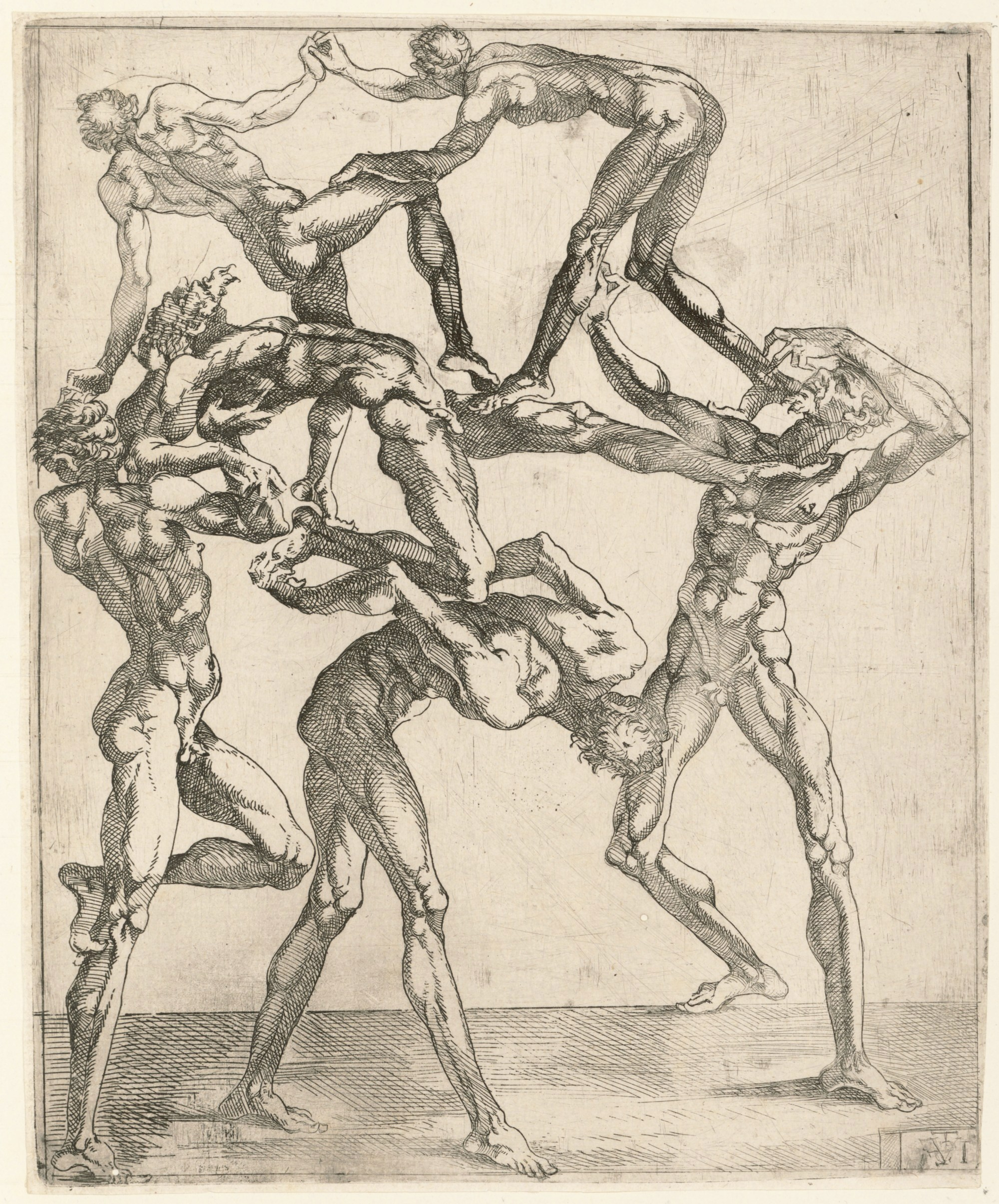
One of Juste's larger series of "Human Pyramid" etchings

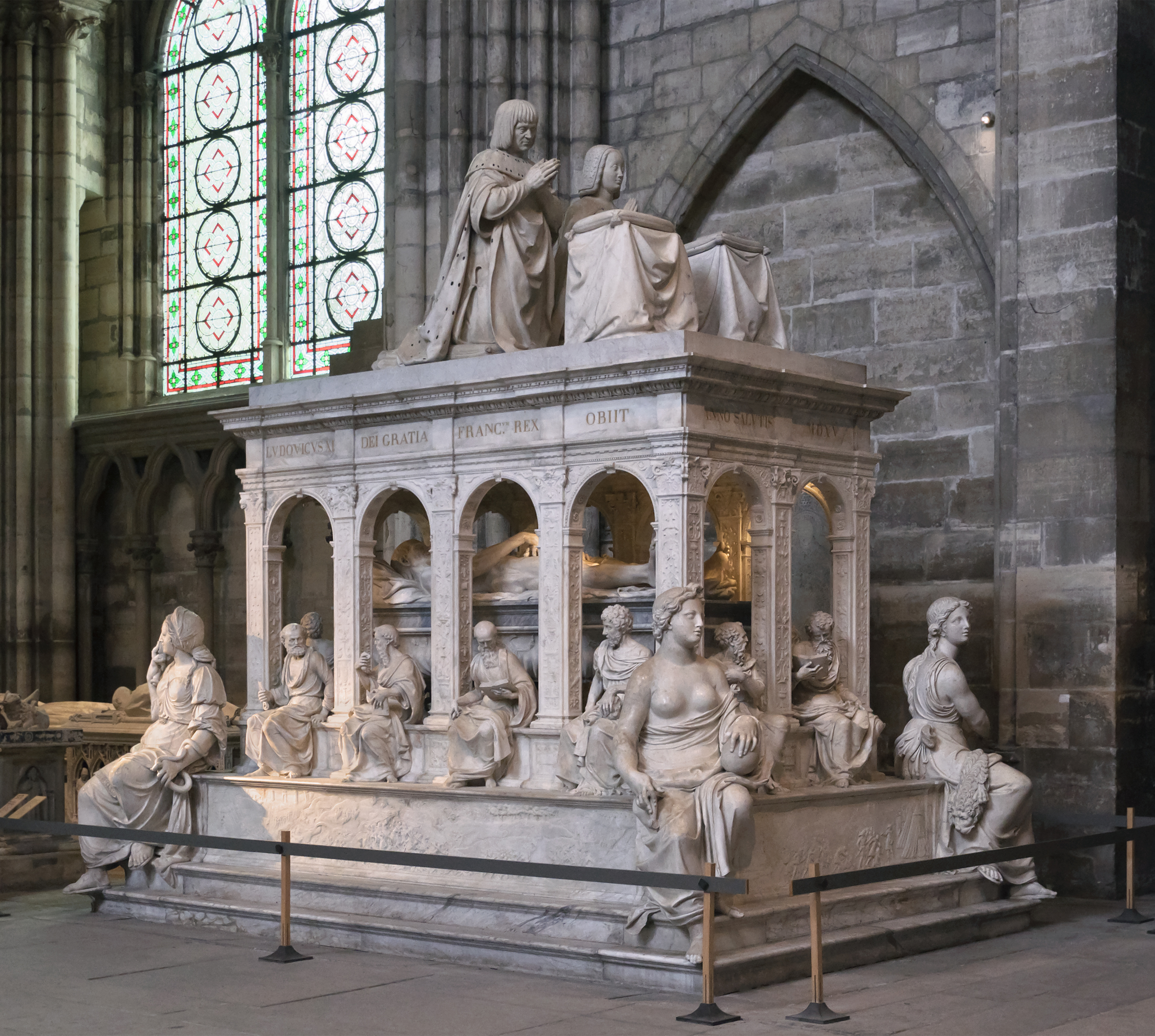
The tomb of Louis XII of France and Anne of Brittany, with Juste's Virtues at the corners

Juste de Juste (ca. 1505 – ca. 1559) was a Franco-Italian sculptor and printmaker in etching, a member of the Betti family of sculptors from near Florence, who became known as the Juste family in France, where Juste de Juste's father Antonio and his two brothers emigrated and spent most of their careers. Juste de Juste has been widely accepted as the author of seventeen etchings of naked or écorché (flayed) male figures signed with a complicated monogram. He also worked as a stuccoist of the School of Fontainebleau under Rosso Fiorentino.

Juste de Juste was born in Tours, and trained by his uncle Jean Juste, his father having died in 1519. He worked with Jean on the mausoleum of Louis XII of France at St-Denis, which occupied his uncle for almost fifteen years from 1516–1531, being especially responsible for the four seated Virtues. In 1529 he was still living in Tours when Francis I commissioned him to make marble sculptures of Hercules and Leda, now lost, and in 1533 he was appointed Sculpteur du Roi (a non-exclusive appointment) as his father and uncles had been before him. The year 1531 marked the beginning of the "First School of Fontainebleau", where Juste de Juste spent most of the period 1531-37, before rejoining the family workshop.

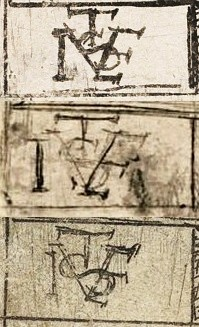
IVSTE monograms from three different "human piramid" etchings

Juste de Juste left a set of twelve small single etched figures (about 195 x 83 mm each; Zerner 6-17) and another set of five larger prints each showing five or six naked male figures forming improbable human pyramids (these about 267 x 205 mm; Zerner 1-5). All the figures are elongated and muscular and many of their faces have anguished grimaces; over much of their bodies the musculature is so exposed they seem flayed, but they have hair and faces. They are usually interpreted as academic exercises in drawing the male figure, perhaps related to the art student's game of marking a number of dots on a piece of paper and then constructing a figure to incorporate them - it is typical of such exercises that the figures touch the frame of the image at several points. The etching technique is personal and direct, but probably not that of a practised printmaker. Like many Fontainbleau prints, the technical finish of the etching is poor, with many unintended marks and variations in the strength of lines, but the images have an intriguing impact. In the case of both sets there is some evidence that there were other members which have not survived.

Only the larger set have the monogram, now agreed to read IVSTE-"Juste" (in reverse). An alternative interpretation has been that they refer to an obscure engraver, Jean Viset, about whom little is known except that he worked at Fontainebleau in 1536. All the prints are rare - again like most School of Fontainebleau prints.

The larger set is often mentioned in the context of works by Henri Matisse culminating in his The Dance (second version) in the Hermitage in St. Petersburg.

He was apparently still living in Tours, where the family workshop continued, at his death about 1559.
