= Juste family =

Family of Italian sculptors

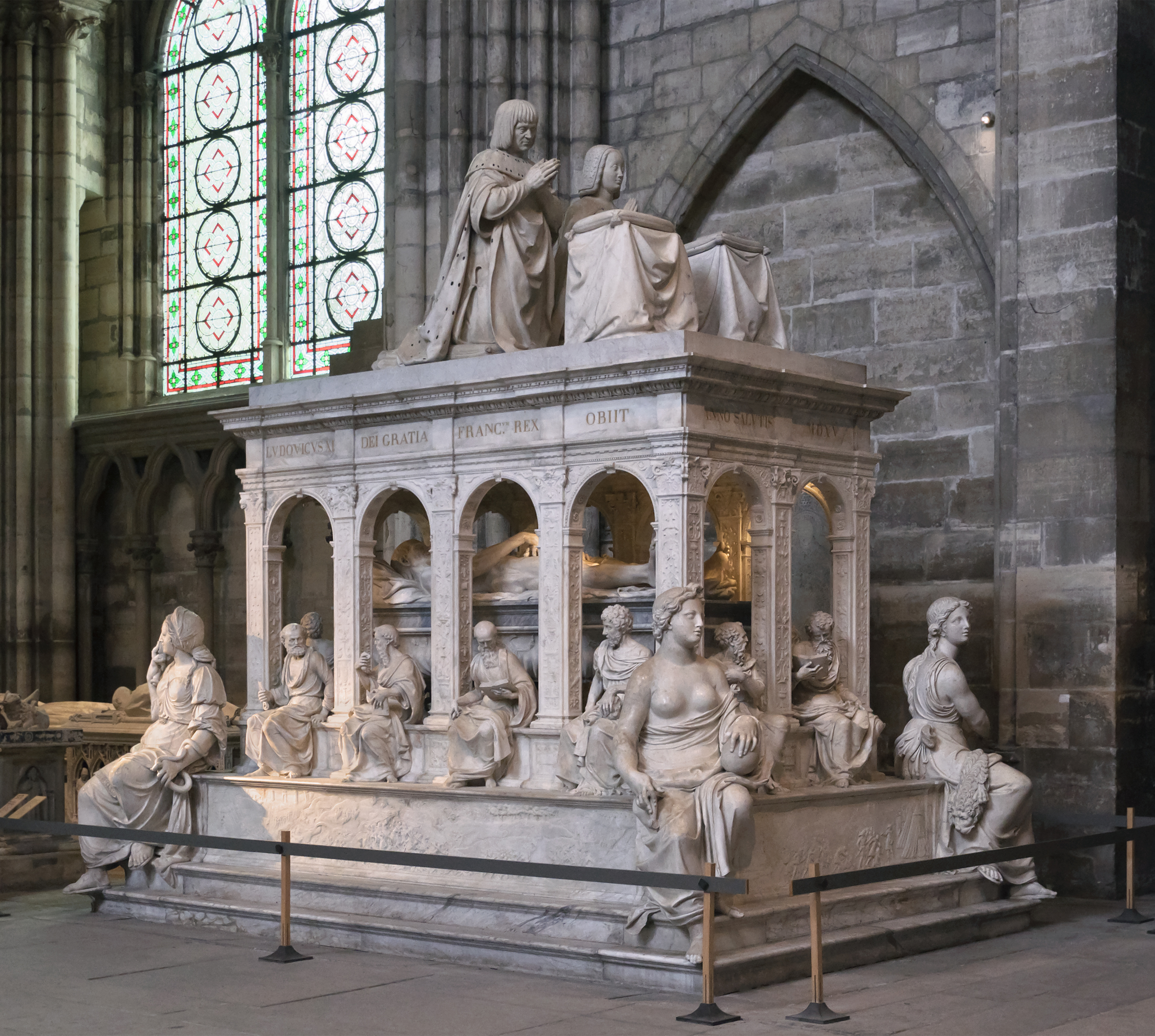
The tomb of Louis XII of France and Anne of Brittany at the Basilique Saint-Denis, mostly by Jean Juste and his nephew Juste de Juste, who was responsible especially for the Virtues at the corners. Completed 1531.

Juste or Giusti is the name conventionally applied to a family of Italian sculptors.

Their real name was Betti, originally from the area of San Martino a Mensola, a church in Florence. Giusto Betti, whose name was afterwards given to the whole family, and Andrea are the first two known to us. Neither seems to have gone out of Italy. But Andrea had three sons - Antonio or Antoine Juste (1479-1519), Andrew (born about 1483), and John or Jean Juste, the best known of the house (1485-1549) - all of whom early emigrated to France and figured prominently during the Renaissance. With Francesco Laurana they stand as the most brilliant representatives and the most active emissaries of Italian art beyond the Alps. Juste de Juste (ca. 1505-ca. 1559), son of Antonio and pupil of Jean, has been widely accepted as the author of some well-known etchings of naked or écorché (flayed) male figures signed with a complicated monogram. He also worked as a stuccoist of the School of Fontainebleau under Rosso Fiorentino.

As early as 1504 the three brothers were in Brittany, at Dol, executing the monument of Bishop Thomas James. Later, they separated. Antoine worked for Georges d'Amboise in the castle of Gaillon; while Jean, attracted to Tours, spent a few years in the atelier of Michel Colombe, famous as the sculptor of the "Entombment" in the Abbey of Solesmes. Colombe was the last representative of the Dijon School, founded by Claus Sluter under the first dukes of Burgundy. At his school Jean Juste became imbued with the realism of Flanders, slightly softened and tempered with French delicacy. Through this combination of qualities, he created for himself a style whose charm consisted in its flexibility and complexity. At the death of Michel Colombe (1512) the Justes worked again in concert and inherited his fame. Francis I of France commissioned them to execute the mausoleum of Louis XII at St-Denis, and this occupied almost fifteen years (1516–31). But Antoine's share in this work was slight, as he died in 1519. The honour of this work belongs entirely to his brother Jean.

The original conception seems to have been Perréal's, and yet it was not wholly his. The iconography of tombs was extremely rich in France in the fifteenth century. Its main theme consists of a gisant or recumbent effigy of the deceased, laid upon a funeral couch surmounting the sarcophagus, upon the sides of which a procession of mourners is represented. The most celebrated example of this style is the monument of Philip the Bold by Claus Sluter, at Champmol, Dijon (1405–10), of which there have been several variants, down to the monument of Philippe Pot (1480) in the Louvre. The tomb of Louis XII inaugurated a new tradition, or rather a colossal development of the subject. The hero is represented kneeling on a catafalque beneath which the gisant appears as a naked, emaciated corpse, "such as death has made it for us".

Jean Juste also executed the tombs of Philippe de Montmorency and of Artus Gouffier in the church of Oiron (Deux-Sèvres), that of Jean Rieux, at Ancenis, of Thomas Bohier, at St-Saturnin, Tours, and of Louis de Crévent at the Trinité, Vendôme. He had one son, John the second, with his cousin Juste de Juste the last sculptor of the family, who died in 1577, and of whom some works are to be seen in the churches of Oiron and Champeaux.
