= Niche (architecture) =

Architectural recess in a wall

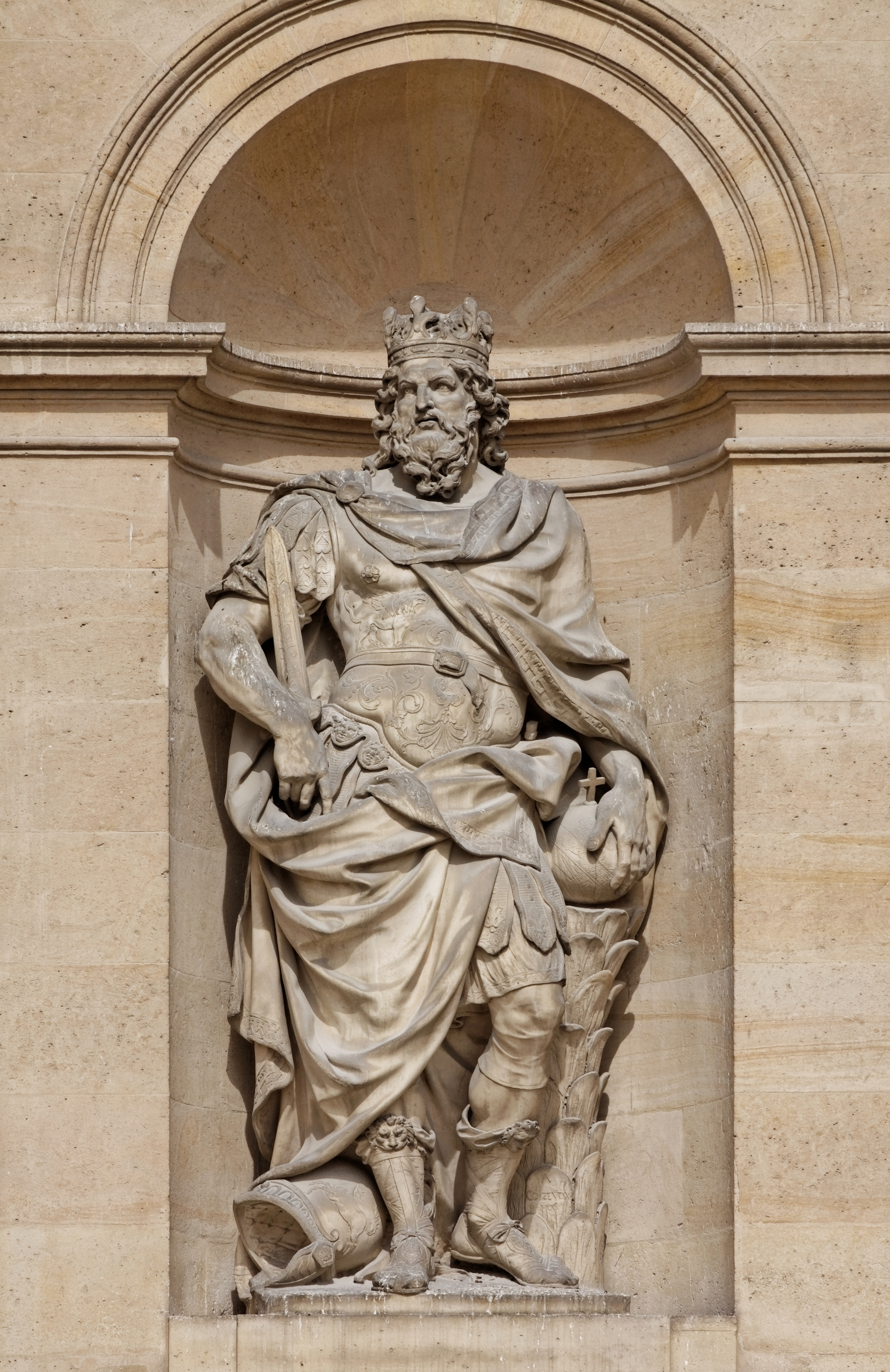
Niche with a sculpture by Antoine Coysevox, in the Les Invalides, Paris

In architecture, a niche (CanE, UK: /ˈniːʃ/ or US: /ˈnɪtʃ/) is a recess or cavity constructed in the thickness of a wall for the reception of decorative objects such as statues, busts, urns, and vases. In Classical architecture examples are an exedra or an apse that has been reduced in size, retaining the half-dome heading usual for an apse. In the first century B.C, there was no exact mention of niches, but rather a zotheca or small room. These rooms closely resemble alcoves similar to a niche but slightly larger. Different sizes and sculpture methods suggest the term niche was understood. Greeks and Romans especially, used niches for important family tombs.

== Etymology ==
The word derives from the Latin nidus (lit. 'nest'), via the French niche. The Italian nicchio (lit. 'sea-shell') may also be involved in the origin of the word, as the traditional decoration for the top of a niche is a scallop shell, hence also the alternative term of "conch" for a semi-dome, usually reserved for larger exedra. As early as the 4th century, such architectural features, or the frame surrounding them are called tabernacles. This definition extends to the ornamentation or framework surrounding doors, windows and niches.

== Types ==
A blind niche is a very shallow niche, usually too shallow to contain statues, and may resemble a blind window (a window without openings) or sealed door. (Compare: blind arcade)

In Gothic architecture, a niche may be set within a tabernacle framing, like a richly decorated miniature house (aedicula), such as might serve for a reliquary. The backings for the altars in churches (reredos) can be embedded with niches for statues.

Though a niche in either Classical or Gothic contexts may be empty and merely provide some articulation and variety to a section of wall, the cult origins of the niche suggested that it be filled with a statue.

In the Encyclopedia Methodique, the authors divide niches into different classes. The classes refer to the shape of the plan and the head (top and bottom), the ornamentation, and entablature. They vary according to their characteristics, from simple to extremely ornate.

== Examples ==
One of the earliest buildings which uses external niches containing statues is the Church of Orsanmichele in Florence, built between 1380 and 1404.

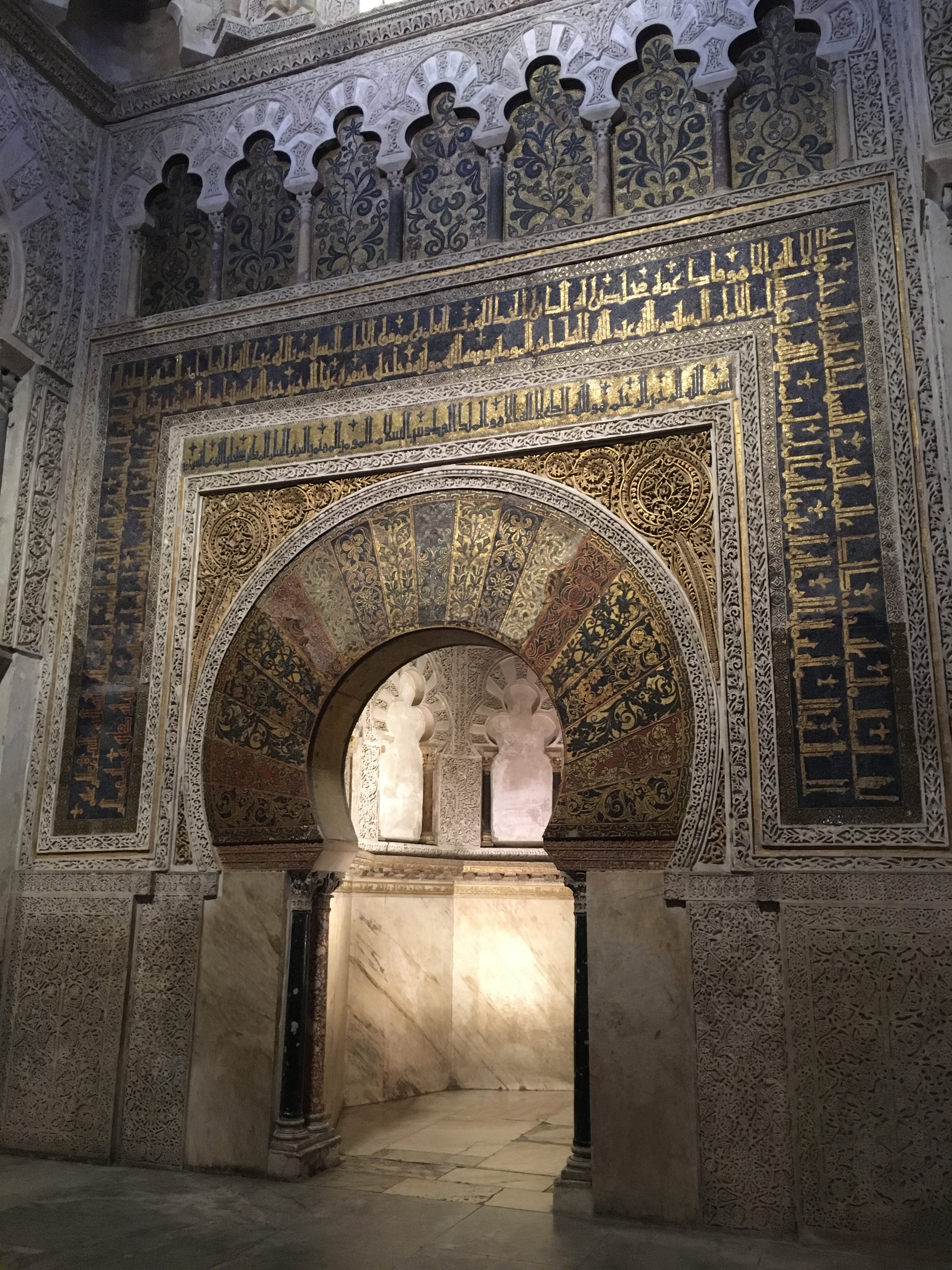
Mihrab from the Mosque of Cordoba (niche shows the direction of prayer)

The Uffizi Palace in Florence (1560–81) modified the concept by setting the niche within the wall so it did not protrude. The Uffizi has two dozen or so such niches containing statues of great historical figures. In England, the Uffizi style niches were adopted at Montacute House (c. 1598), where there are nine exterior niches containing statues of the Nine Worthies.

In Fra Filippo Lippi's Madonna, the trompe-l'œil niche frames her as with the canopy of estate that was positioned over a personage of importance in the late Middle Ages and Early Modern Europe. At the same time, the Madonna is represented as an iconic sculpture who has "come alive" with miraculous immediacy.

Porta Maggiore niches appear between arches.

In Iran, a Mihrab is a type of niche in the wall of a mosque at the point nearest to Mecca toward which the congregation faces to pray. This is The Great Mosque of Cordoba; its Mihrab is formed of small, glazed glass tiles and plaster creating a mosaic.

Niches aren't only one sided as is the case of the Porta Maggiore where niches flank both sides of the gate and at one time displayed statues. Small Roman temples called Aedicula were often decorated with niches. For example, an aedicula on Lake Albano in Italy has six niches of varying heights, suggesting that anything up to the height of the statue could be accommodated.

== Gallery ==
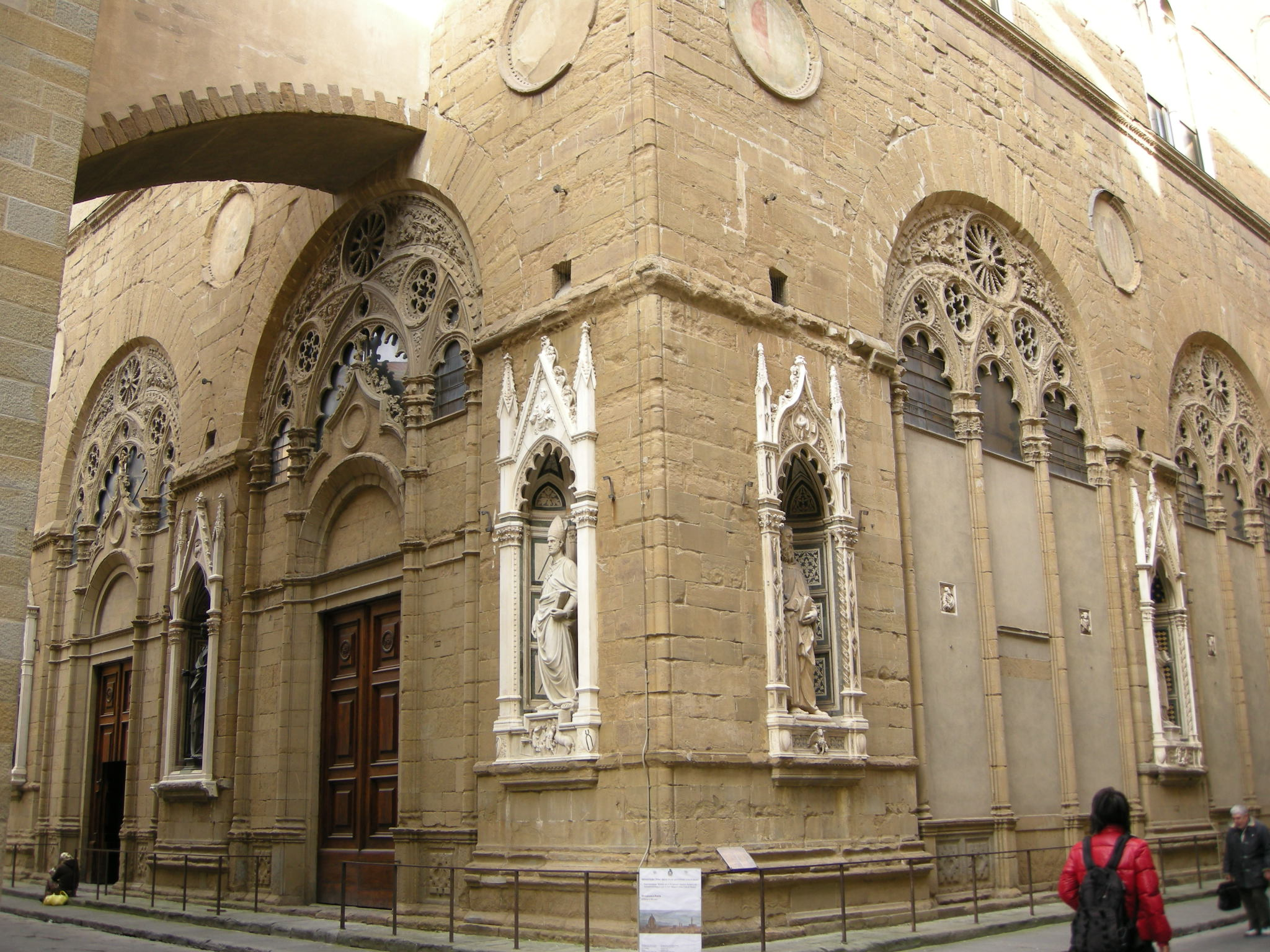
Niches containing statues on exterior of Church of Orsanmichele, Florence, c. 1380–1404

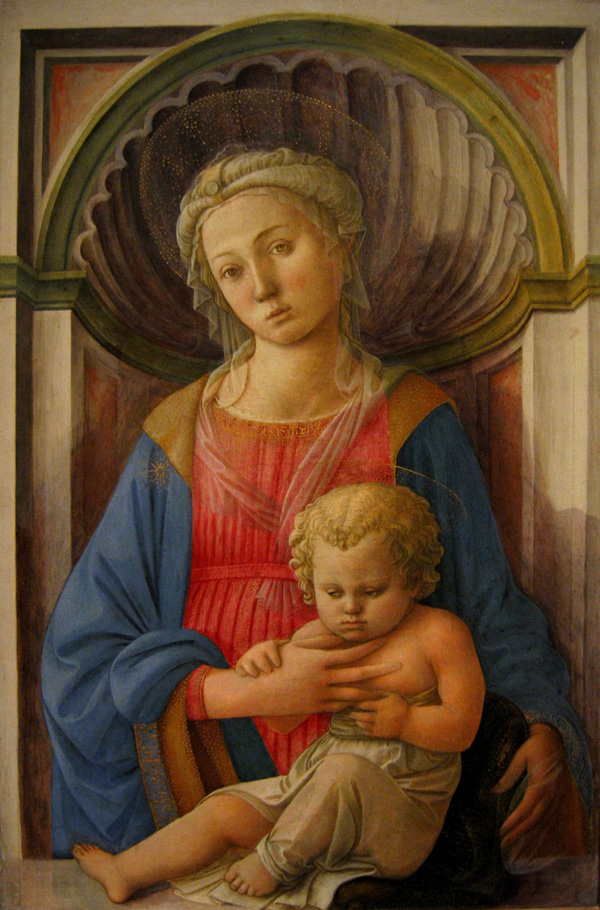
Renaissance painter Filippo Lippi placed his Madonna of the 1440s within a simulated shell-headed niche

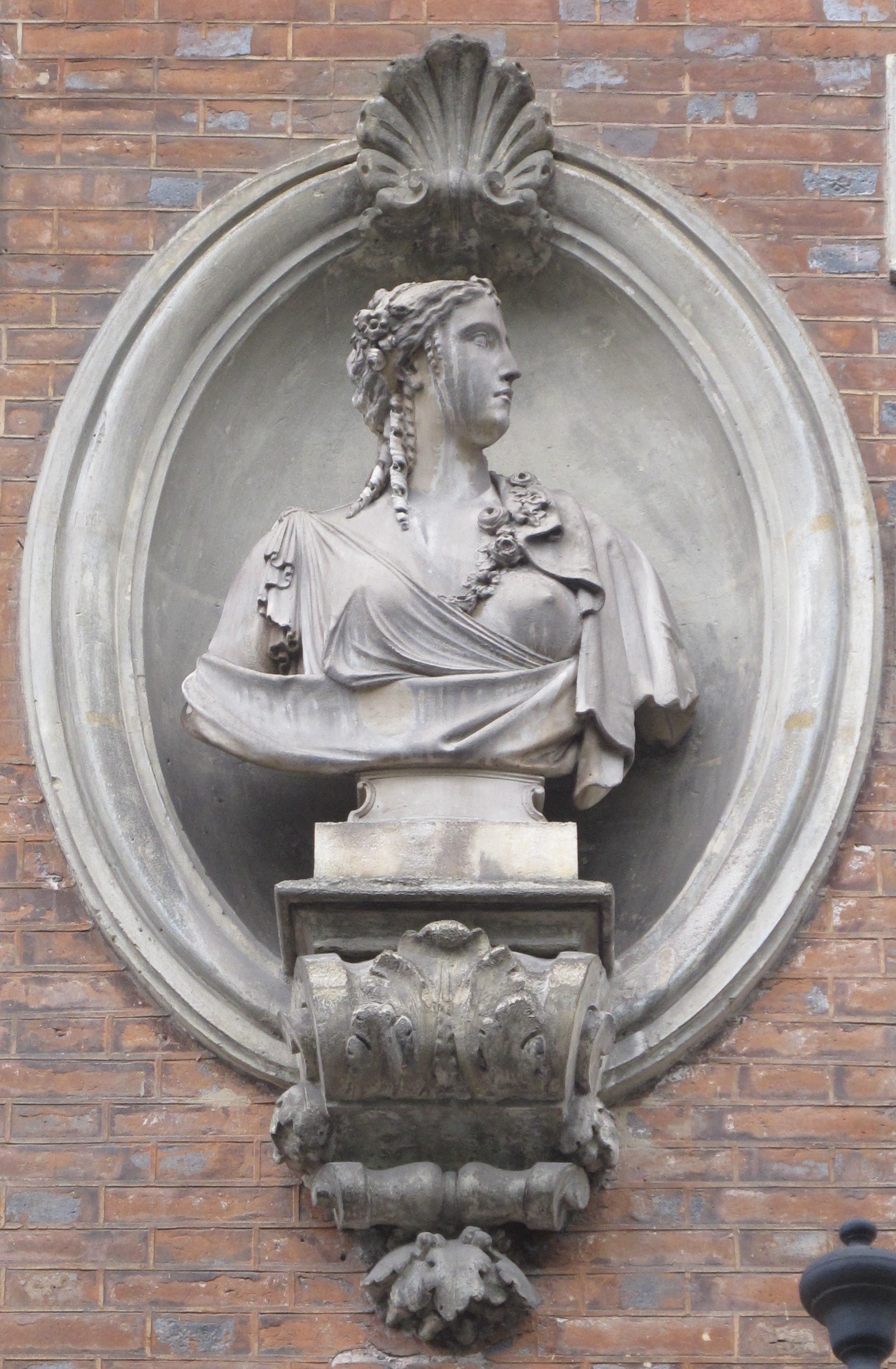
Feminine bust in a niche on a building from Paris

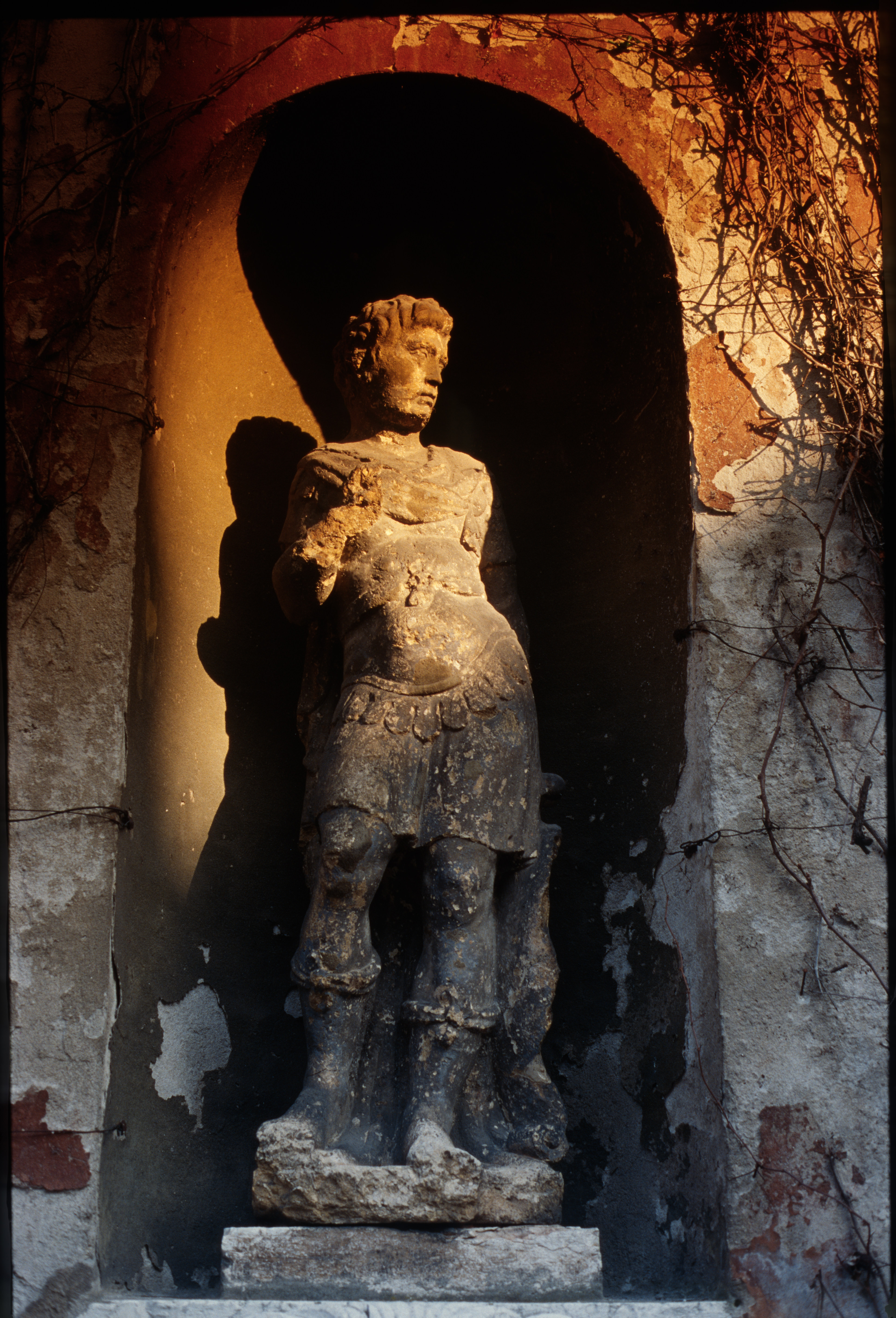
Exedra-shaped niche with a Apollo sculpture, in the Palazzo Giusti, Verona

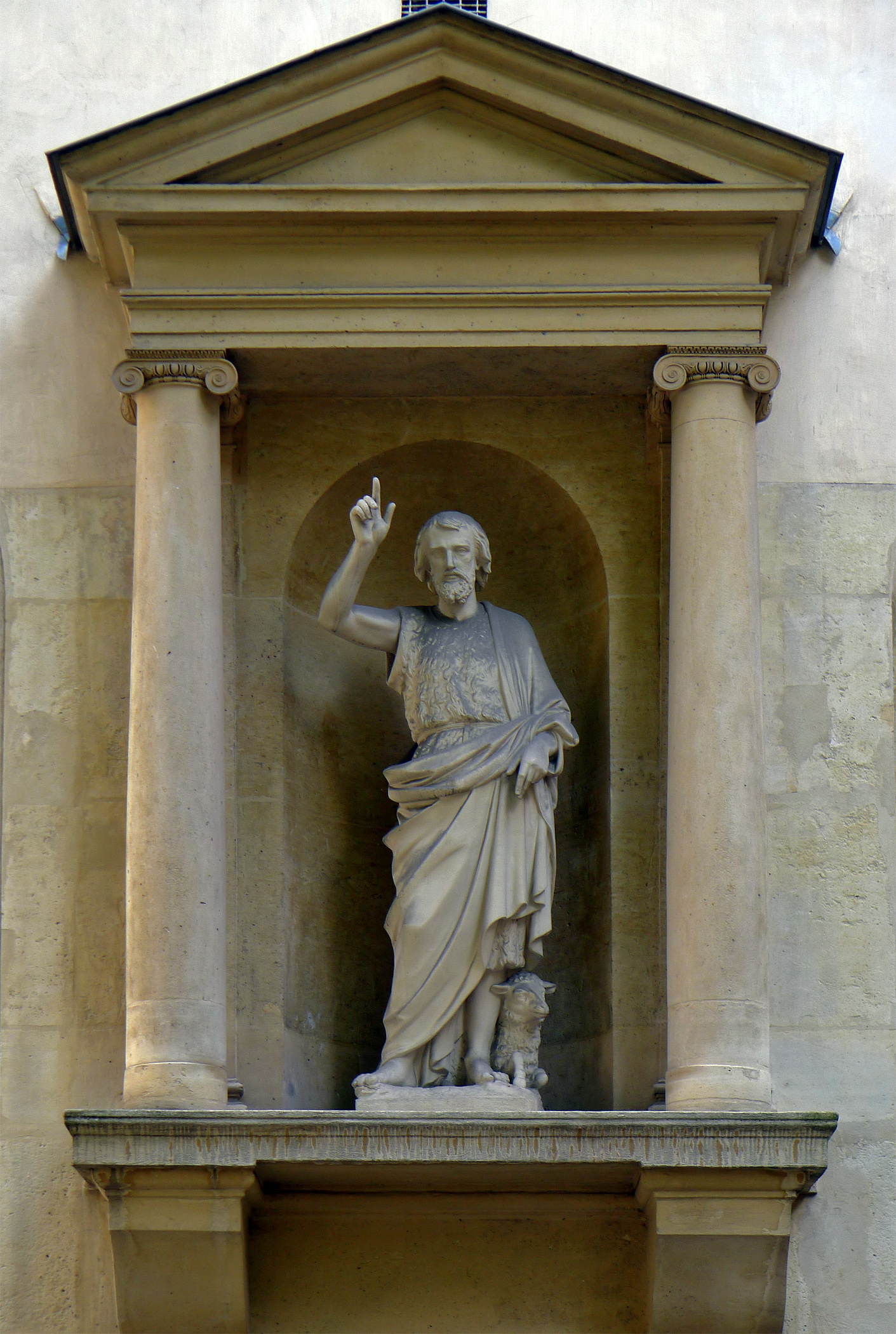
Statue in a niche on a cathedral from Paris

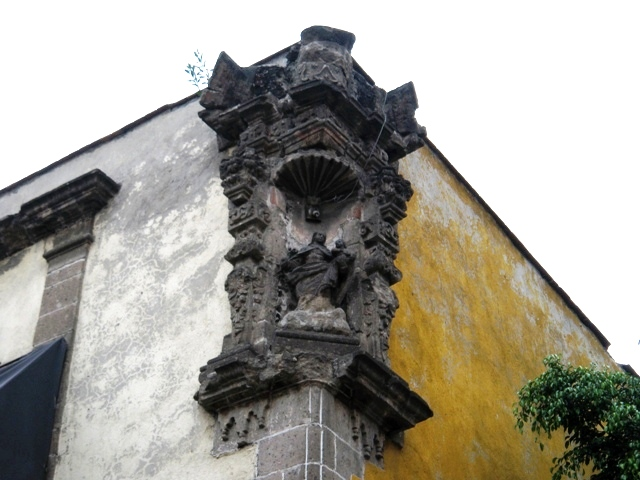
Niche in a Baroque palace in La Merced, Mexico City.

== See also ==
- Alcove (architecture)
- Grotto
- Mihrab

== Sources ==
- Sir John Summerson. Heavenly Mansions, 1948. OCLC 10409612. Discussion of the Gothic aedicule.
