= Palazzo Fontana Rezzonico =

Coordinates: 45.4411°N 12.3333°E

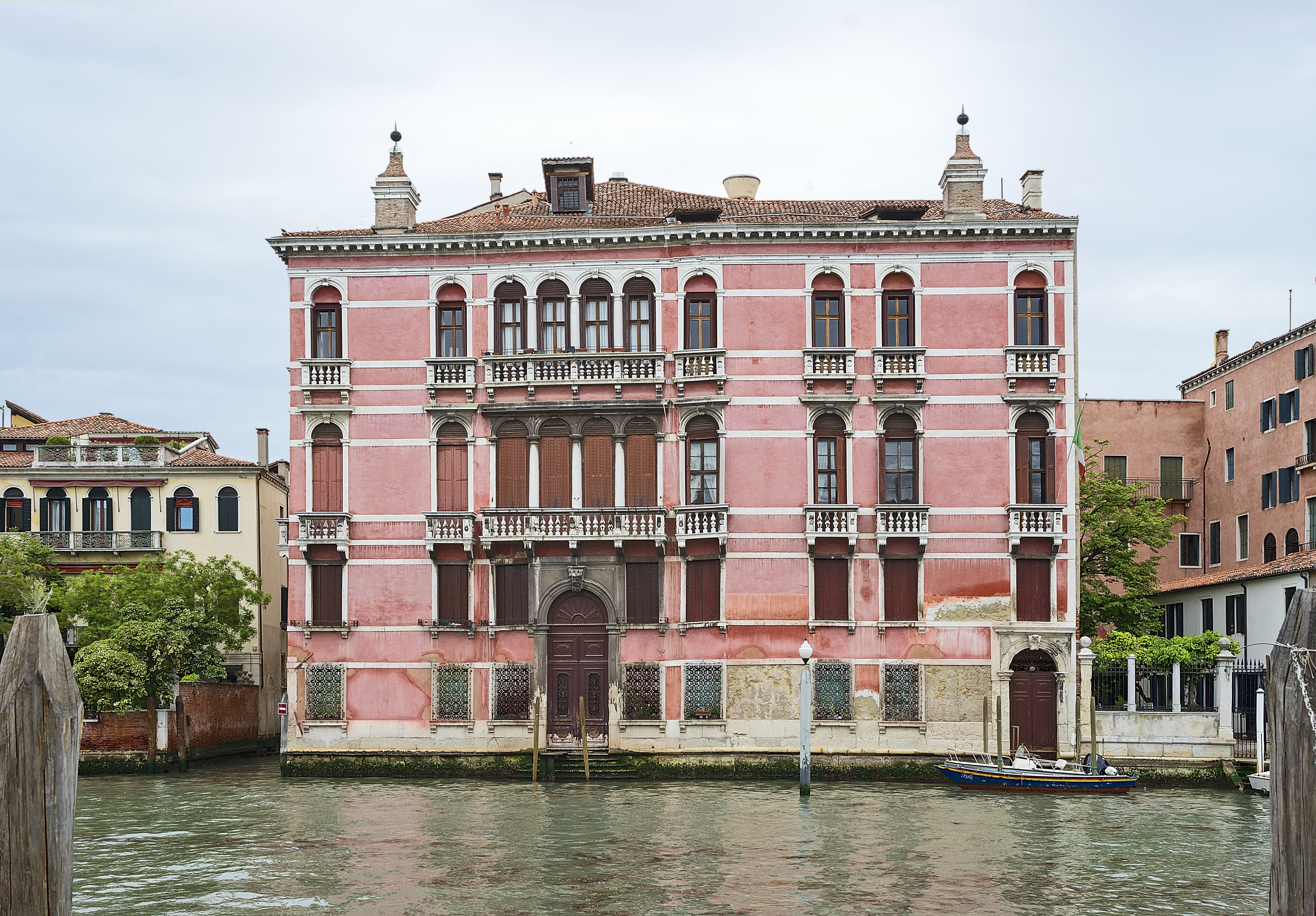
Palazzo Fontana Rezzonico

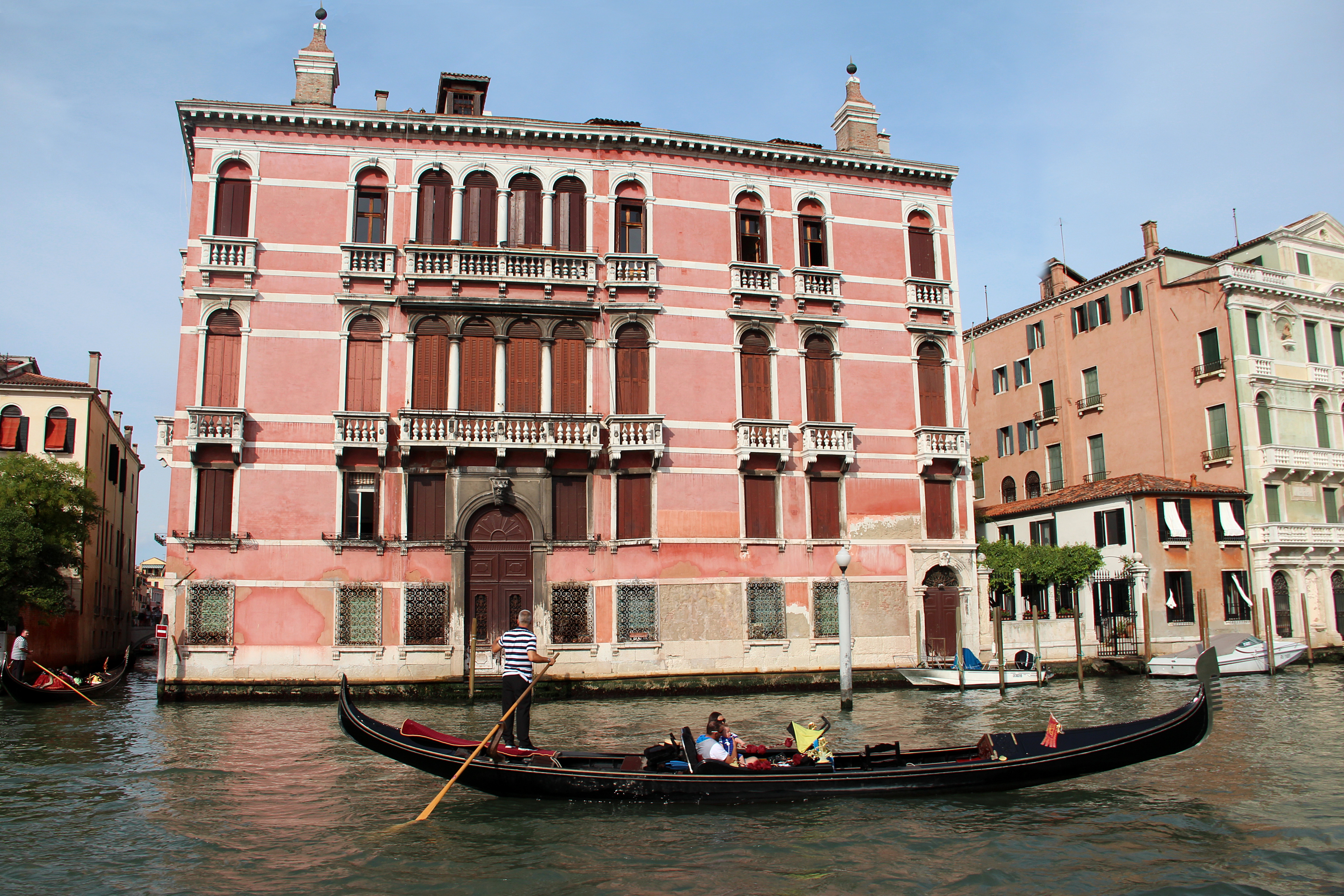
The Canal Grande and the Palazzo. Palazzo Rezzonico.

The Palazzo Fontana Rezzonico is a palace located on the Canal Grande of Venice, between the Rio di San Felice and Palazzo Miani Coletti Giusti in the Sestiere of Cannaregio, Venice, Italy.

== History ==
The palace was erected in the 17th century by the Fontana family. The palace was occupied in the late 1600s by the Rezzonico family, recently added to the Venetian Patriciate. The larger Ca' Rezzonico palace was under construction. In 1693, Carlo Rezzonico, the future Pope Clement XIII was born here. After the fall of the Venetian Republic, the palace was purchased by the banker Johann Conrad Reck, then sold to the Levi, and then Sullam families.

The red-colored palace with an asymmetric facade sports an eclectic style: built during the Baroque period with abundant balconies, but hearkening to earlier models. The front has two obelisk like chimneys.

== Bibliography ==
- Brusegan, Marcello (2007). Newton & Compton (ed.). I Palazzi di Venezia. Roma. ISBN 978-88-541-0820-2. Brusegan.
