= Giuseppe Giusti =

Italian poet and satirist

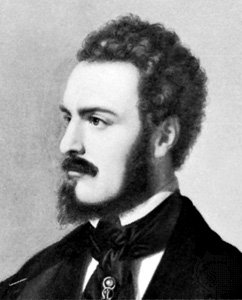
Giuseppe Giusti, detail of an oil painting by Ferdinando Rondoni.

Giuseppe Celestino Giusti (Italian pronunciation: [dʒuˈzɛppe ˈdʒusti]; 12 May 1809 – 31 May 1850) was an Italian poet and satirist.

== Biography ==
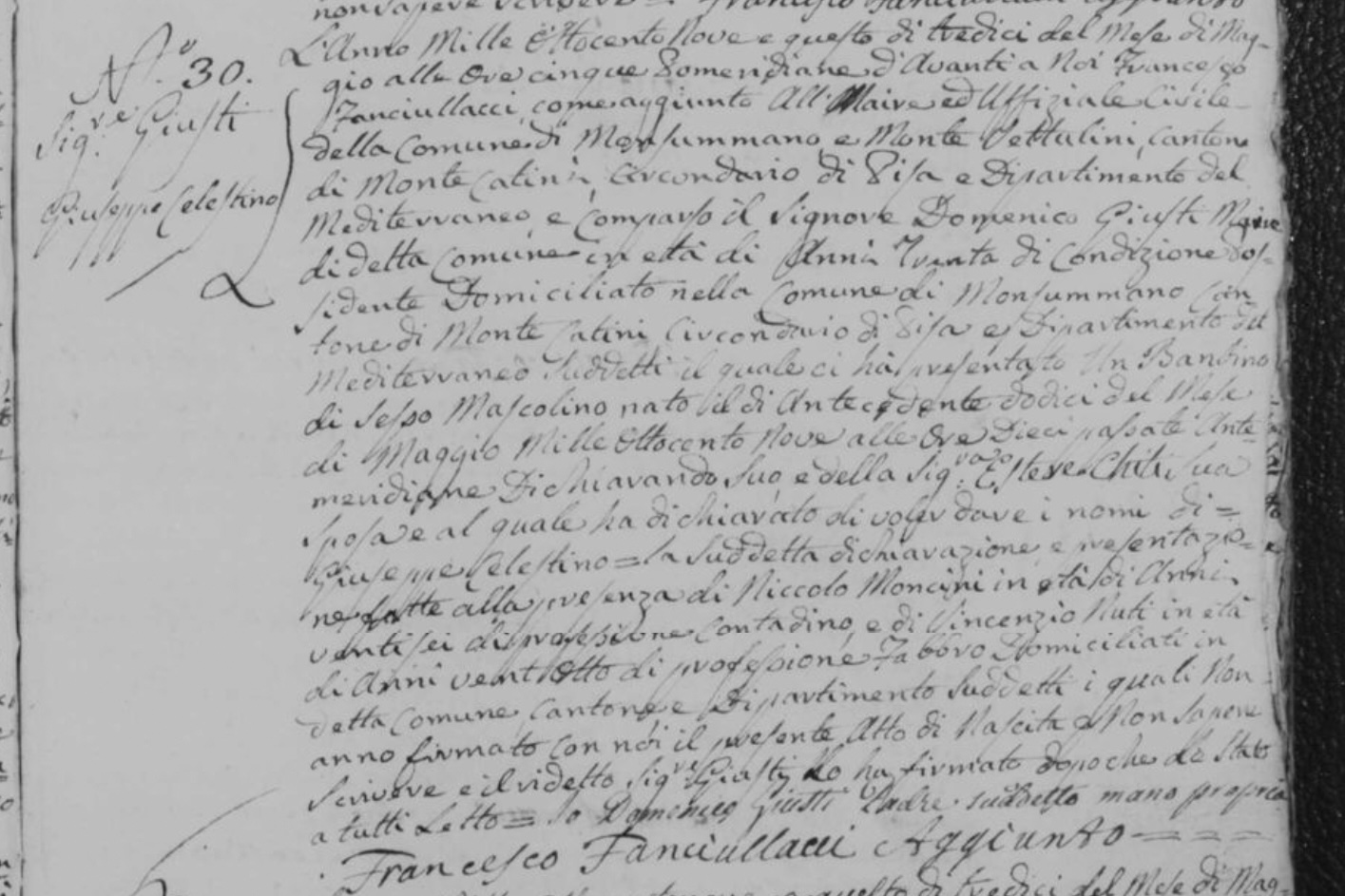
Giuseppe Giusti birth certificate

Giuseppe Celestino Giusti was born at Monsummano Terme, now in the province of Pistoia.

His father, a cultivated and rich man, accustomed his son from childhood to study, and himself taught him, among other subjects, the first rudiments of music. Afterwards, in order to curb his too vivacious disposition, he placed the boy under the charge of a priest near the village, whose severity did perhaps more evil than good. At twelve Giusti was sent to school at Florence, and afterwards to Pistoia and to Lucca; and during those years he wrote his first verses.

In 1826, Giusti went to study law at the University of Pisa. He disliked the subject. Partly because of a political satire he wrote that displeased authorities, it took him eight years, instead of the customary four, before he eventually earned a law degree in 1834. On graduating, Giusti proceeded to establish himself in Florence, Italy, claiming to his parents it was to practice law, but he instead pursued his literary interests. Despite earning a degree, he would never practice law.

He lived gaily, though his father kept him short of money, and learned to know the world, seeing the vices of society, and the folly of certain laws and customs from which his country was suffering. The experience thus gained, he turned to good account in the use he made of it in his satire.

His father had, in the meantime, changed his place of abode to Pescia; but Giuseppe did worse there, and in November 1832, his father having paid his debts, he returned to study at Pisa, seriously enamoured of a woman whom he could not marry, but now commencing to write earnestly in behalf of his country. With the poem called La Ghigliottina (the guillotine), Giusti began to strike out a path for himself and thus revealed his great genius. From this time, he showed himself the Italian Béranger, and even surpassed the Frenchman in richness of language, refinement of humour and depth of satirical conception. In Béranger, there is more feeling for what is needed for popular poetry. His poetry is less studied, its vivacity perhaps more boisterous, more spontaneous; but Giusti, in both manner and conception, is perhaps more elegant, more refined, more penetrating.

In 1834, Giusti, having at last earned a degree in the legal profession, left Pisa to go to Florence, nominally to practice with the advocate Capoquadri, but once there, he set out to enjoy life in the then-capital of Italy, Tuscany, where he devoted himself to literary interests.

He fell seriously in love a second time. As before, he was abandoned by his love. It was then that he wrote his finest verses. Although his poetry was not yet collected in a volume, for some years it passed from hand to hand, as was often the custom, and his name gradually became famous. The greater part of his poems were published clandestinely at Lugano, at no little risk, as the work was destined to undermine the Austrian rule in Italy.

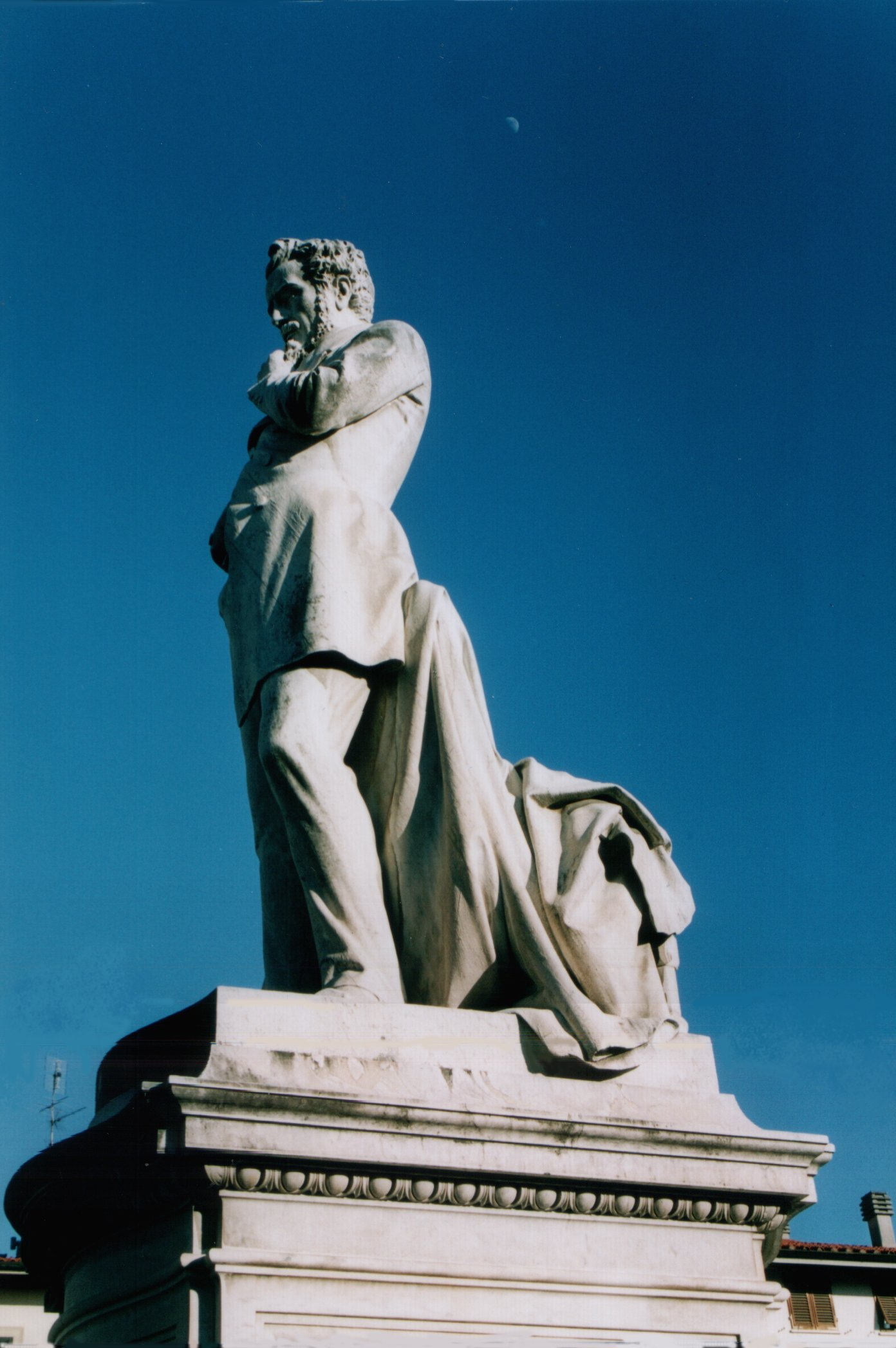
Monument to Giuseppe Giusti in Monsummano Terme, sculpted by Cesare Fantacchiotti.

After the publication of a volume of verses at Bastia, Giusti thoroughly established his fame by his Gingillino, the best in moral tone as well as the most vigorous and effective of his poems. The poet sets himself to represent the vileness of the treasury officials, and the base means they used to conceal the necessities of the state. The Gingillino has all the character of a classic satire. When first issued in Tuscany, it struck all as too impassioned and personal. Giusti entered heart and soul into the political movements of 1847 and 1848, served in the national guard, sat in the parliament for Tuscany; but finding that there was more talk than action, that to the tyranny of princes had succeeded the tyranny of demagogues, he expressed to fear, that for Italy, evil rather than good had resulted. After expressing these sentiments publicly, he lost much of the regard from a public that had held him previously in high estimation, and after 1848, Giusti became regarded as a reactionary. His friendship for the marquis Gino Capponi, who had taken him into his house during the last years of his life, and who published after Giusti's death a volume of illustrated proverbs, would also compromise him in the eyes of people such as Francesco Domenico Guerrazzi, Giuseppe Montanelli and Giovanni Battista Niccolini. On 31 May 1850 he died at Florence in the palace of his friend.

A life of Giusti was written in English and published not long after his death by Susan Horner, The Tuscan Poet Giuseppe Giusti, and his times [Macmillan and Co, 1864].

== Works ==
=== Satire ===
Giusti became known for witty satires written during the period of the Italian Risorgimento. His commentary during the early years of Italy’s nationalistic movement against Austrian rule outlived their political period, and is enjoyed for its lively Tuscan style and preservation of the classic Tuscan tongue.

His satires defended Italy or lamented the social conditions of its political state.

At first, Giusti’s satirical poems were circulated from hand to hand only in manuscript form. To circumvent political repercussions, the first collections had to be printed outside Italy, without the author’s name. His first notable satire, written in 1833, was La guigliottina a vapore (“The Steam Guillotine”). The satire announced that the Chinese had invented a steam guillotine, making the decapitation of dictators much more efficient.

=== Poetry ===
Giusti's early compositions were distributed among people in manuscript form. He called them his "scherzi" ("jokes," or "light, playful verse"), and they were short lyrics of varied themes, some about love, others political or social commentaries. These early verses, a literary style obviously influenced by Petrarch, were finally published with his agreement in 1844, in Leghorn. In university texts of 1874, the poetry of Giusti was described as "nothing extreme, nothing exaggerated, nothing forcefully lyrical or impudently vulgar."

Giusti's poetic style eventually departed from what had been a Tuscan tradition of jocose, playful verse. He developed his own voice and style of an elaborate simplicity, with themes of aspiration to a life that shuns social niceties and untruth. Poetically, it aspires to wisdom, honesty, frankness, and clarity. His work held literary romanticism in contempt.

The poetry of Giusti has a lofty civilizing significance. The type of his satire is entirely original, appeared at the right moment, and wounded judiciously, sustaining the part of the comedy that "castigat ridendo mores." Hence, his verse, apparently jovial, was received by the scholars and politicians of Italy in all seriousness. Alexander Manzoni in some of his letters showed a hearty admiration of the genius of Giusti; and the weak Austrian and Bourbon governments regarded them as of the gravest importance.

=== English translations ===
A selection of Giuseppe Giusti's poetic works was translated by William Dean Howells in Modern Italian Poets (1887). Other parts were translated by Theodosia Trollope.

== Further reading (sources) ==
- Adami, Stefano, 'Giuseppe Giusti', in Encyclopedia of Italian Literary Studies, ed. Gaetana Marrone e
- Puppa P., Routledge, New York-London, 2006.
- Sabbatucci, Nunzio [Ed.]: Opere di Giuseppe Giusti. Torino: Unione Tip.-Ed. Torinese, 1976. (Classici italiani; [89]).
- Zeni, Marilena: L'uomo poeta Giuseppe Giusti. Illustr. da Alberto Fremura. Pisa: Pacini, 1979.
