= Cesare Fantacchiotti =

Italian sculptor

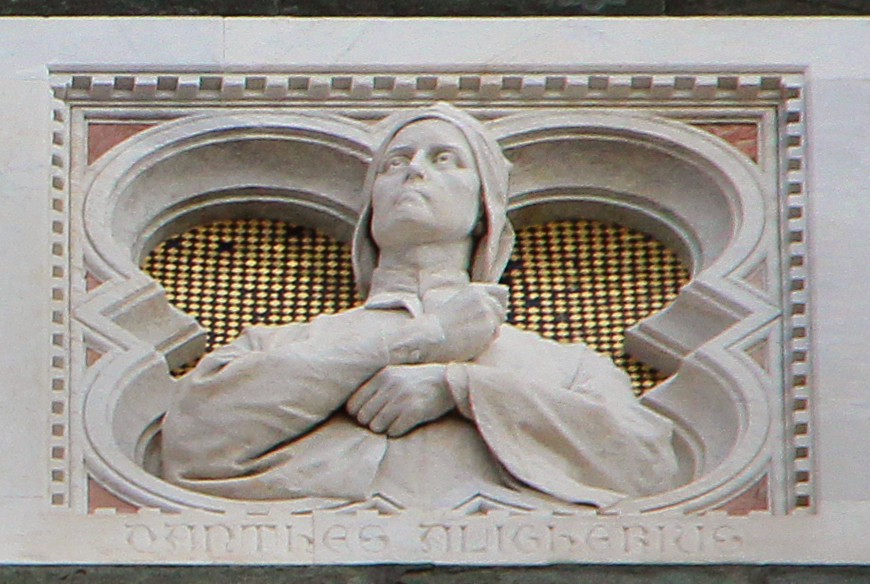
- Sculpture of Dante Alighieri, Santa Maria del Fiore (Florence)' facade
- Born: 1849; Florence, Italy
- Died: 1922 (aged 72–73)
- Known for: Sculptor

Cesare Fantacchiotti (1844 – 1922) was an Italian sculptor.

== Biography ==
He was born in Florence, the son of the famous sculptor Odoardo Fantacchiotti. Cesare sculpted two of the statues (Boccaccio and Accursio at the base of the Loggia of the Uffizi depicting famous Tuscans. He made the Monument to Giuseppe Giusti at Monsummano. his studio in Florence was at Via Panicale #39. He completed the statue of San Bartolomeo for exterior of the Duomo of Florence.
