= Palazzo Giusti, Venice =

Coordinates: 45.4409°N 12.3336°E

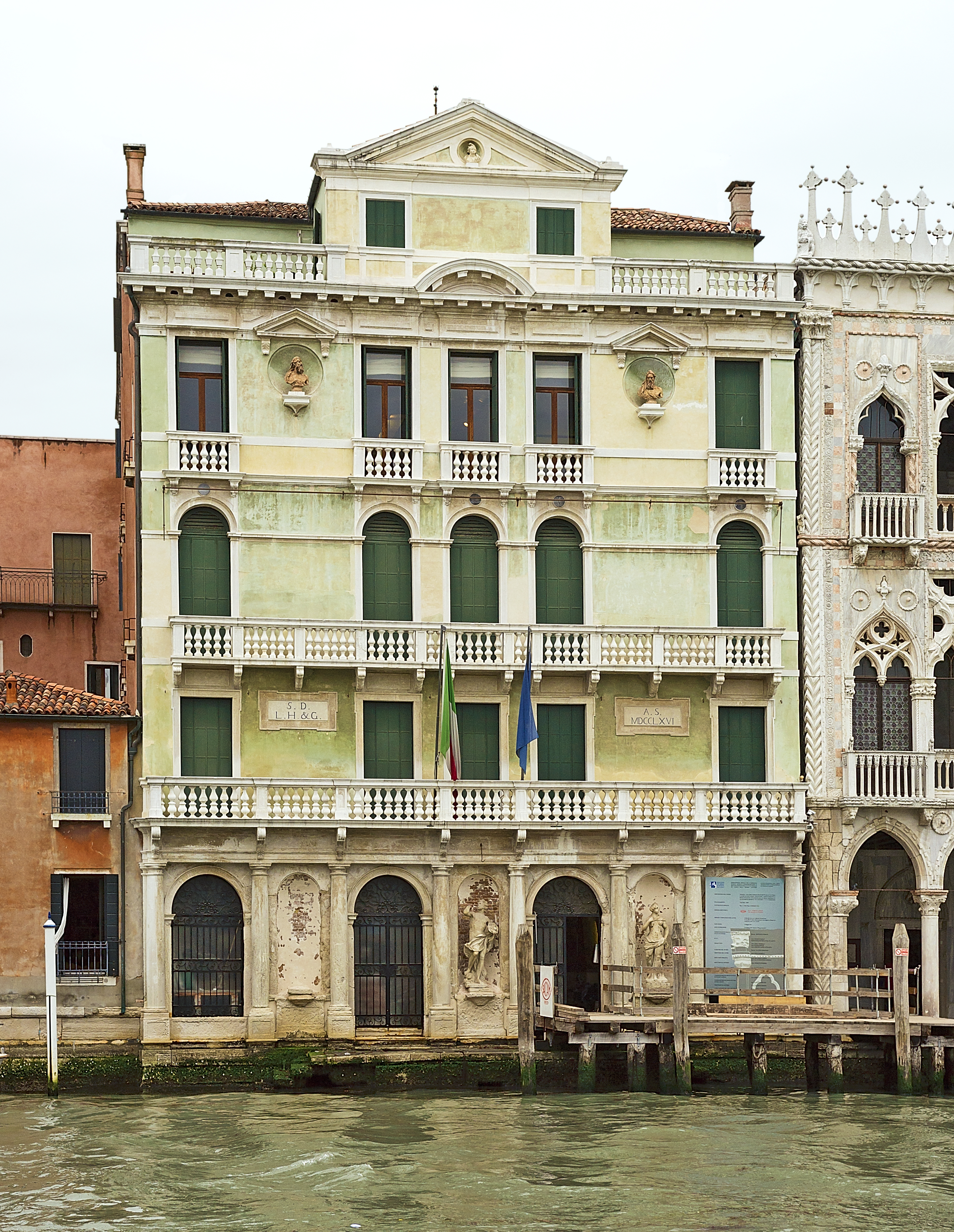
Palazzo Giusti

The Palazzo Giusti, also known as the Palazzo Miani Coletti Giusti, is a Neoclassic-style palace located on the Canal Grande of Venice, between Ca' d'Oro and Palazzo Fontana Rezzonico in the Sestiere of Cannaregio, Venice, Italy.

== History ==
The palace was built in 1766, and soon became property of the Miani family, who sold it to the Coletti, then the Giusti. Along with the adjacent Ca' d'Oro, it houses portions of the Galleria Giorgio Franchetti alla Ca' d'Oro. The architect Antonio Visentini designed the four story palace with three ground floor niches displaying statues, flanked by doric pilasters.

== Architecture ==
The principal façade of Palazzo Giusti is greenish and was designed by Antonio Visentini with various style remainders to the Palladian architecture, such as: a high number of monofora openings instead of the polifora, which normally distinguish the noble (living) floors, the three water doors which are delimited by Doric order pillars and also are separated by three niches containing 18-century human statues, a remarkable eaves line inscribed in a lowered arch, an important attic room facing two terraces with a small column balustrade. The last noble floor hosts two circular niches surrounded by just as much tympana.

== Bibliography ==
- Brusegan, Marcello (2007). Newton & Compton (ed.). I Palazzi di Venezia. Roma. ISBN 978-88-541-0820-2. OCLC 886364236. Brusegan.
