= Odoardo Fantacchiotti =

Italian sculptor

- Born: 20 May 1811; Rome, French Empire (now Italy)
- Died: 24 June 1877 (aged 66); Florence, Italy
- Known for: Sculptor
- Style: late-Neoclassic period

Odoardo Fantacchiotti (20 May 1811 – 24 June 1877) was an Italian sculptor of the late-Neoclassic period.

== Biography ==
He was born in Rome, but his family moved to Florence. In 1820, he enrolled in the Accademia di Belle Arti di Firenze.

At the Academy, he studied under S. Ricci, and first started exhibiting in 1828. Gaining the patronage of the Grand Duke, he continued his studies, following the ideas of Aristodemo Costoli of depicting the "bello naturale". In 1839 at the Academy, he exhibited the work of the Massacre of the Innocents. In 1840 he was named professor at the Academy.

Among his public works are the statue of Boccaccio and Accursius for the ground floor niches of the courtyard of the Uffizi, medallions commemorating Francesco Redi and the bust of Ferdinando II de' Medici for the Museo della Specola, a statue of Sallustio Bandini (now at the Accademia dei Georgofili, but initially planned for the loggia of the Uffizi. A marble Virgin and Child relief by Fantacchiotti at the Victoria and Albert Museum was once mistake for a work by a Renaissance master. He died in Florence.

His son, Cesare Fantacciotti, was also a sculptor.
