= Karin Giusti =

American sculptor

Karin F. Giusti
- Born: Grosse Pointe, Michigan
- Education: MFA from Yale, BFA from University of Massachusetts
- Known for: Arts, Sculpture, Public Art Installations
- Notable work: Three Seasons at Black Forest Farm, Dreamweave, Safety Net
- Awards: John Simon Guggenheim Memorial Foundation Fellowship in Sculpture Installation (1997), Award for Excellence in Creative Achievement from Brooklyn College (CUNY) (2005), Bogliasco Fellowship in Visual Art (2007)
- Website: https://www.karingiusti.com/

Karin Giusti is an Italian American sculptor and installation artist. She splits her time between the United States and Italy. Her parents were Italian from Tuscany, she fell in love with Italy and she has established her Italian studio in Abruzzo.

She has lectured widely at institutions including the Smithsonian Institution, in Washington DC on “Temporary Public Art”, at Columbia University Teachers College, New York (NY) on "Public Art/Public Culture". Her work has been written about in magazines and newspapers including Art New England, The Boston Globe, Berkshire Fine Arts, Art in America, ArtForum and The New York Times. Her projects have been hosted by Creative Time in NYC, Lower Manhattan Cultural Council, galleries and museums like MIT, The Aldrich Museum, Real Art Ways.

== Education ==
Giusti received her MFA from Yale in 1989, and her BFA from University of Massachusetts at Amherst in 1987. Since 1994, Giusti has been Professor of Art and Head of Sculpture at Brooklyn College.

She holds masters in Sculpture from Yale University and a Bachelors of Fine Art from University of Massachusetts Amherst. She is Professor Emirati at Brooklyn College City University of New York.
