= Giovanni Battista Giusti =

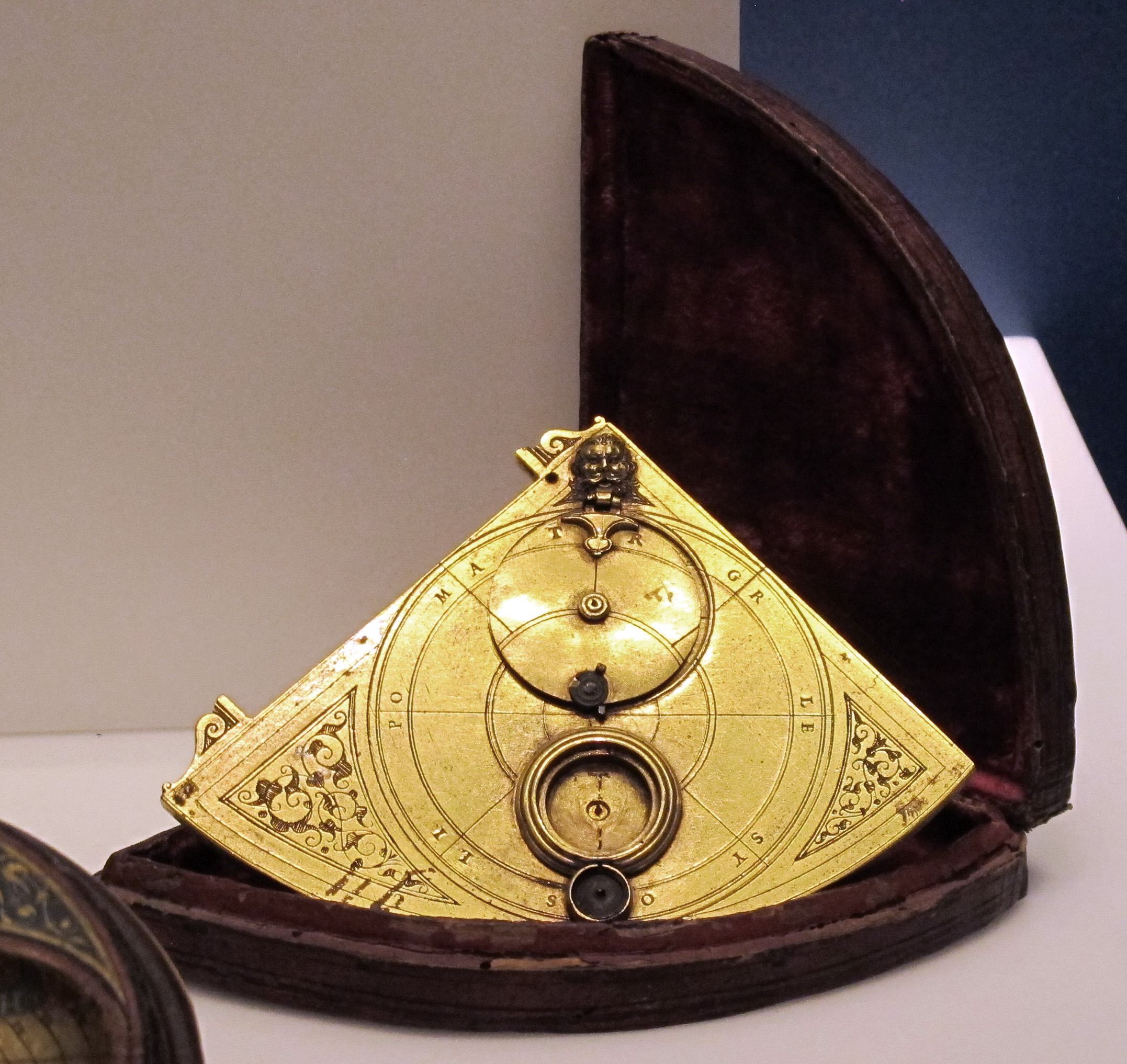
Giovanni Battista Giusti, hour dial, ca 1550–1600, belonged to Vincenzo Viviani.

Giovanni Battista Giusti was a scientific-instrument maker. Giusti worked as a scientific-instrument maker in Florence for the Grand Duke's workshops around the mid-sixteenth century.
