= Quoin =

Masonry blocks at the corner of a wall

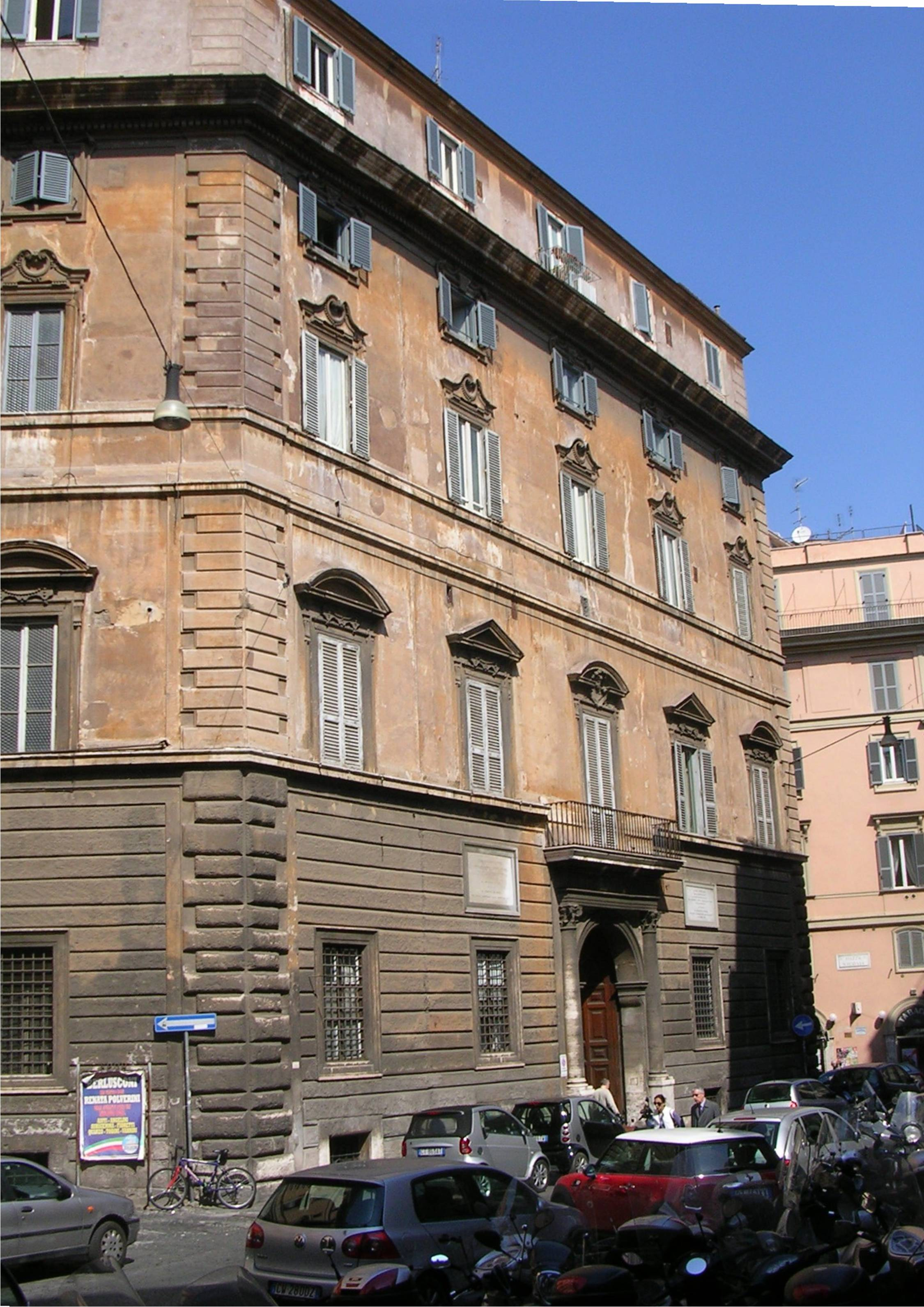
Quoining on the corners of Palazzo Aragona Gonzaga, Rome

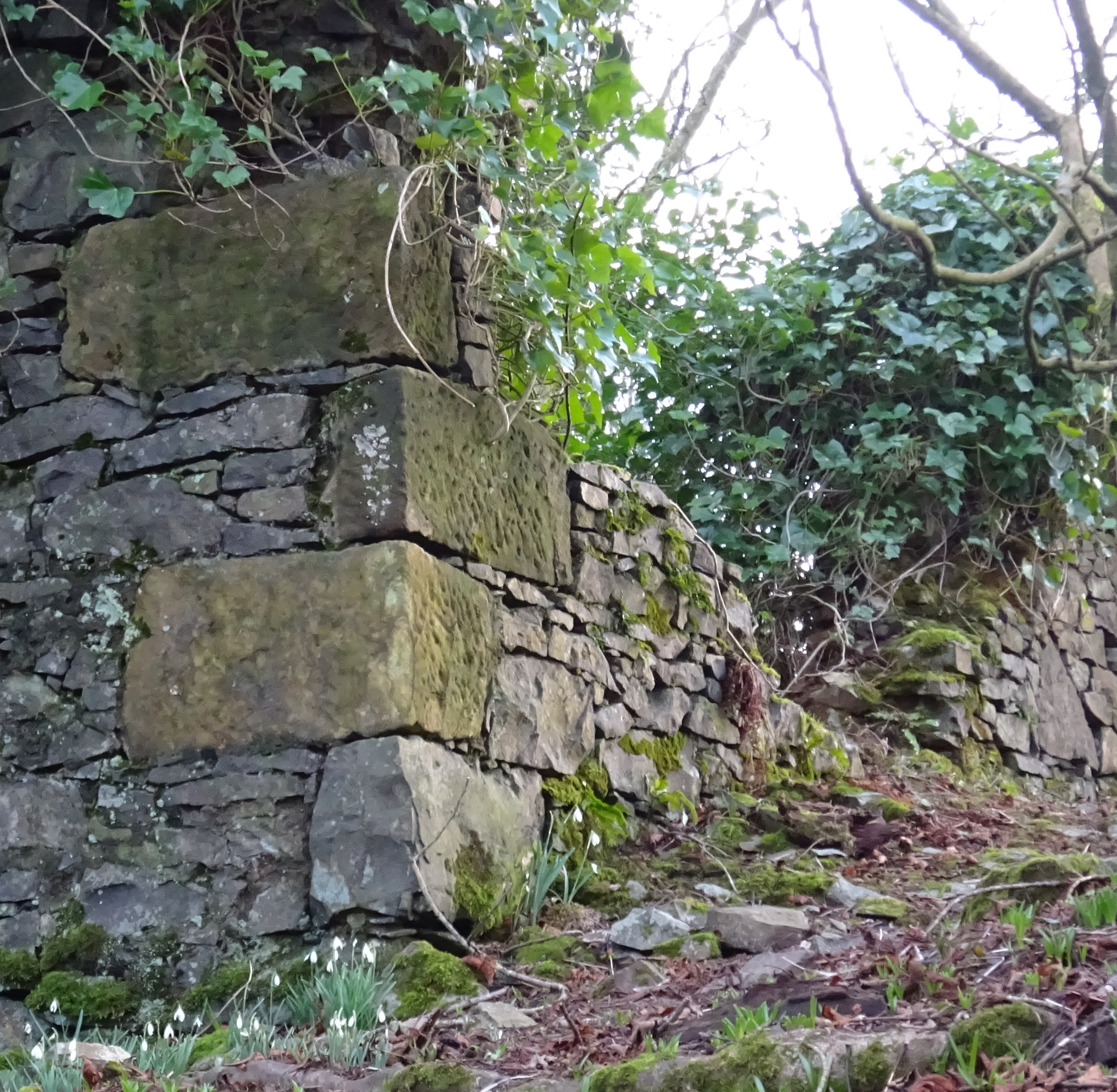
Alternate horizontal quoining on a wall in East Ayrshire

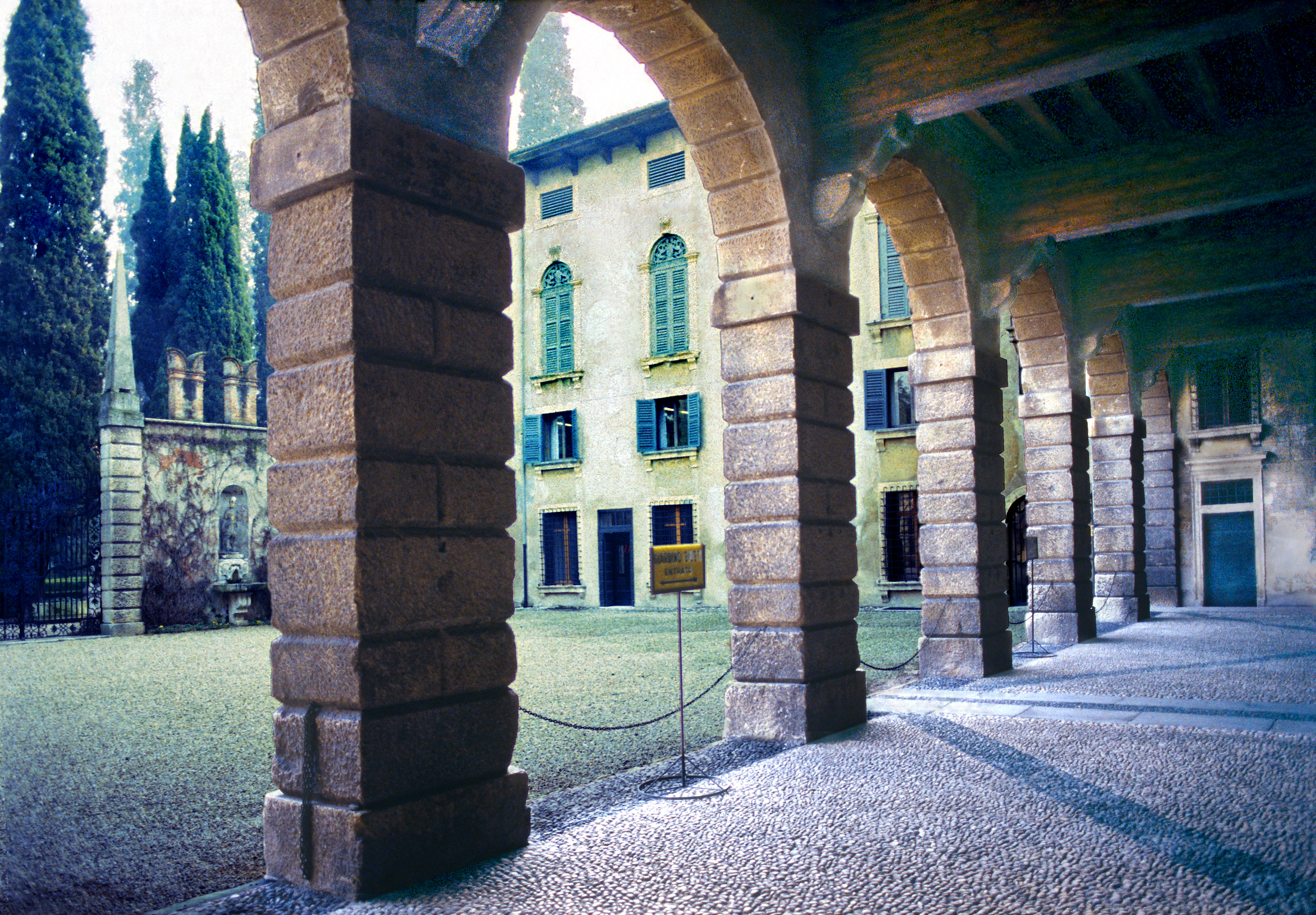
Porch quoins, Palazzo Giusti, Verona

Quoins (/kɔɪn/ or /kwɔɪn/) are masonry blocks at the corner of a wall. Some are structural, providing strength for a wall made with inferior stone or rubble, while others merely add aesthetic detail to a corner. According to one 19th-century encyclopedia, these imply strength, permanence, and expense, all reinforcing the onlooker's sense of a structure's presence.

Stone quoins are used on stone or brick buildings. Brick quoins may appear on brick buildings, extending from the facing brickwork in such a way as to give the appearance of generally uniformly cut ashlar blocks of stone larger than the bricks. Where quoins are decorative and non-load-bearing a wider variety of materials is used, including timber, stucco, or other cement render.

== Techniques ==
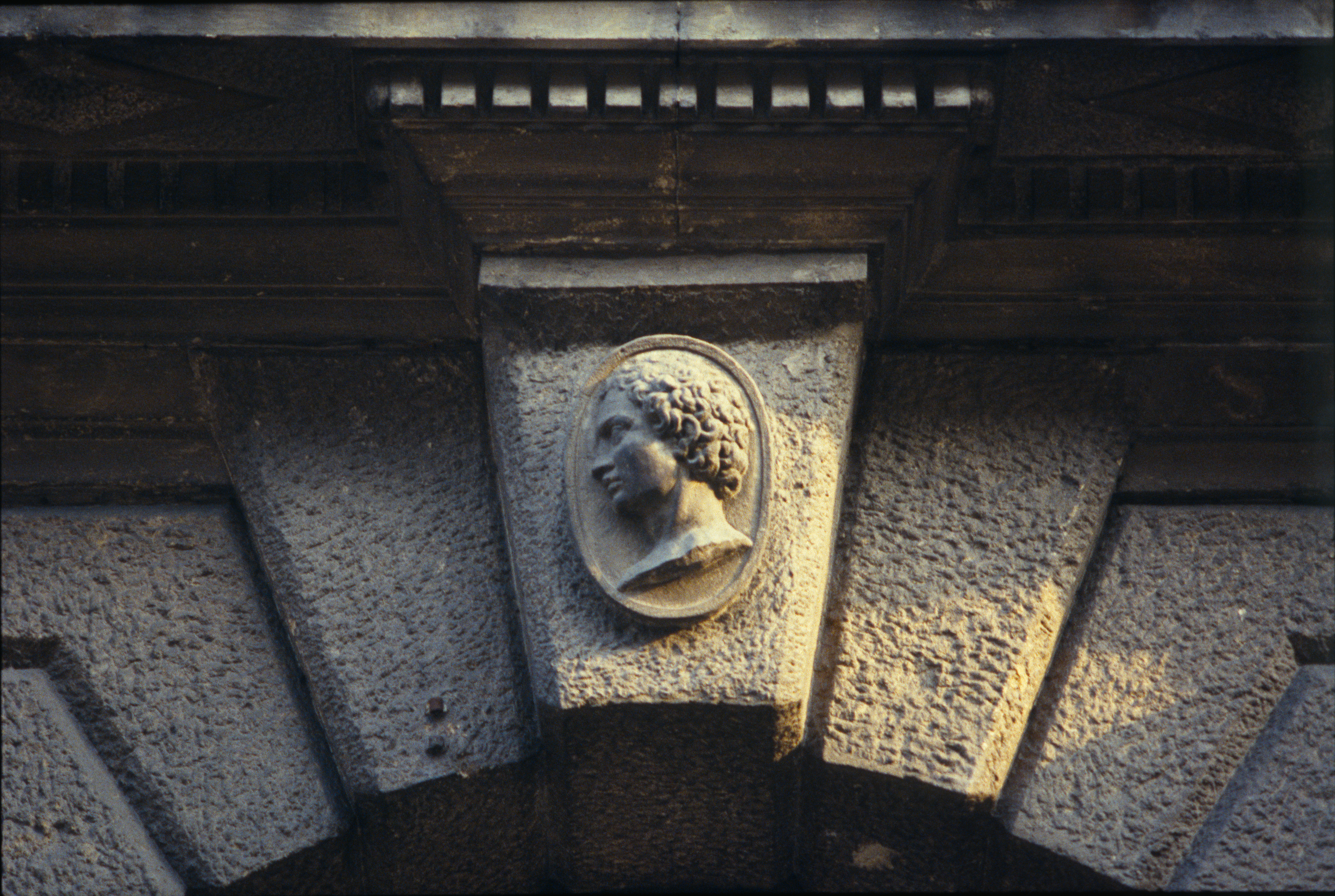
Rustic quoins and keystone on the main entrance to the Palazzo Giusti, Verona

=== Ashlar blocks ===
In a traditional, often decorative use, large rectangular ashlar stone blocks or replicas are laid horizontally at the corners. This results in an alternate, quoining pattern.

=== Alternate cornerstones ===
Courses of large and small corner stones are used, alternating between stones of different thickness, with typically the larger cornerstones thinner than the smaller.

=== Alternate vertical ===
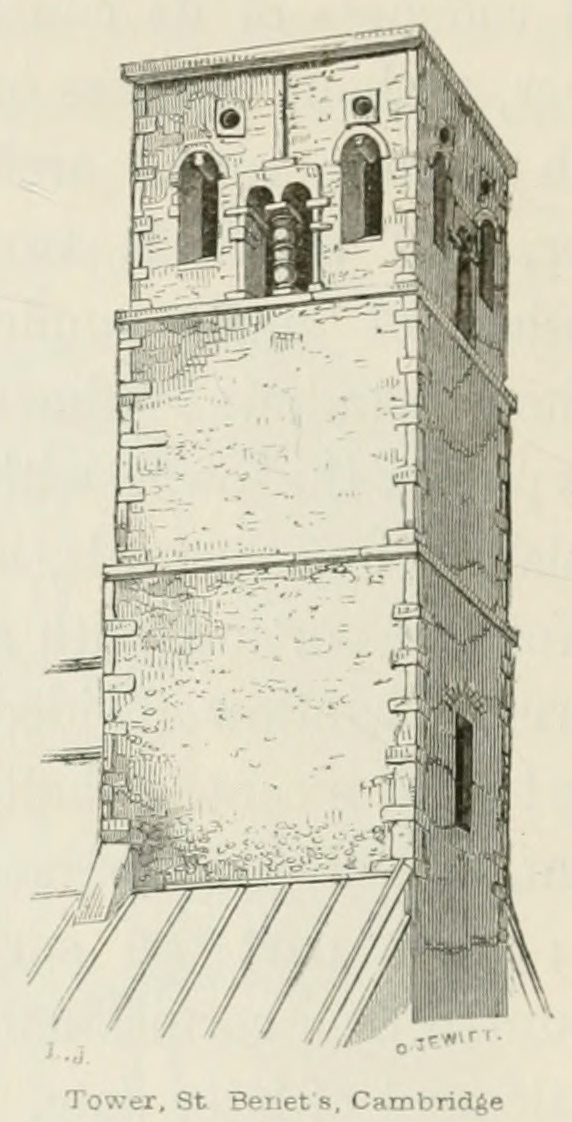
Tower of St Benet's, Cambridge, showing long and short work

The long and short quoining method instead places long stone blocks with their lengths oriented vertically, between smaller ones that are laid flat. This load-bearing quoining is common in Anglo-Saxon buildings such as St Bene't's Church in Cambridge, England.
