= Palazzo Giusti =

Palace and garden in Verona, Italy

Coordinates: 45°26′37″N 11°0′26″E

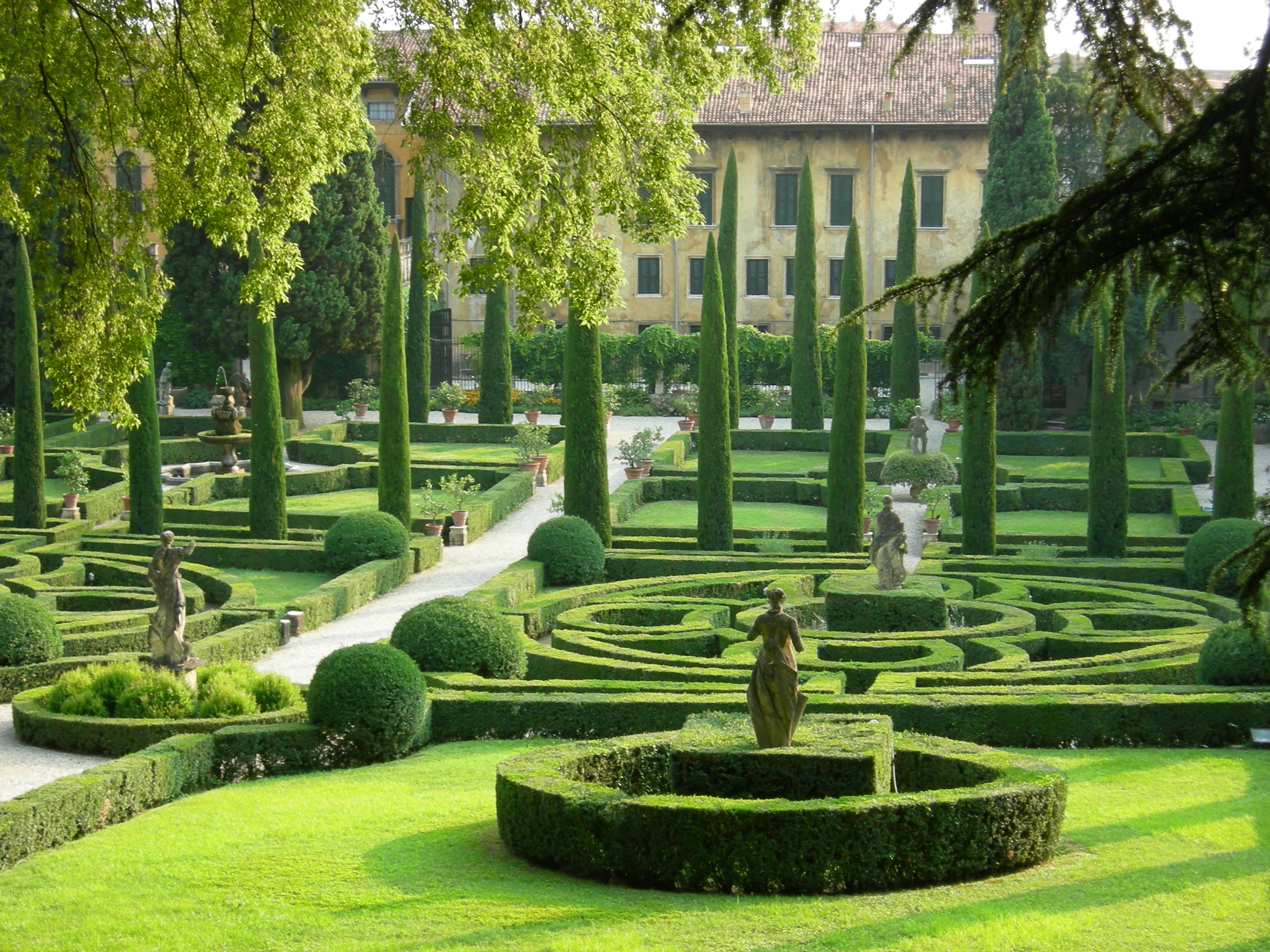
The Giusti garden

The Giusti Palace and Garden (Italian: Palazzo e giardino Giusti) are located in the east of Verona, Italy, a short distance from Piazza Isolo and near the city centre. The palace was built in the sixteenth century. The garden is considered one of the finest examples of an Italian garden.

The palace is a 16th-century Mannerist structure with a tower added in 1701.

The Italian Renaissance gardens were planted in 1580 and are regarded as some of the most beautiful Renaissance gardens in Europe, a splendid park of terraces climbing upon the hill. They include a parterre and hedge maze, and expansive vistas of the surrounding landscape from the terrace gardens. First, only two square parterres right and left hand of the cypress way were designed, and a maze behind the right one, as figured in Nürnbergische Hesperides in 1714. Some years later, four additional flower parterres were laid out left hand, as to be seen at a map in the Verona State Archives. The booklet, Il paradiso de' Fiori by Francesco Pona (1622) informs about the plants used in this time in Giardino Giusti as does also some planting sketches by Pona included in the new edition of this book, Milano 2006. The actual unifying layout of the garden parterres dates from early 20th century. The maze was reconstructed after 1945.

The Giusti family, owner of the palace since the 16th century, was entitled by the Austro-Hungarian Emperor to change its original surname to "Giusti del Giardino" because of the importance of the gardens.

In 2020, the garden was hit by a severe storm, causing severe damage to the plants and killing a lot of the trees, including the 600-year old Goethe cypress. The garden has since this incident been added to Europa Nostra's "7 Most Endangered" list of heritage sites at risk.

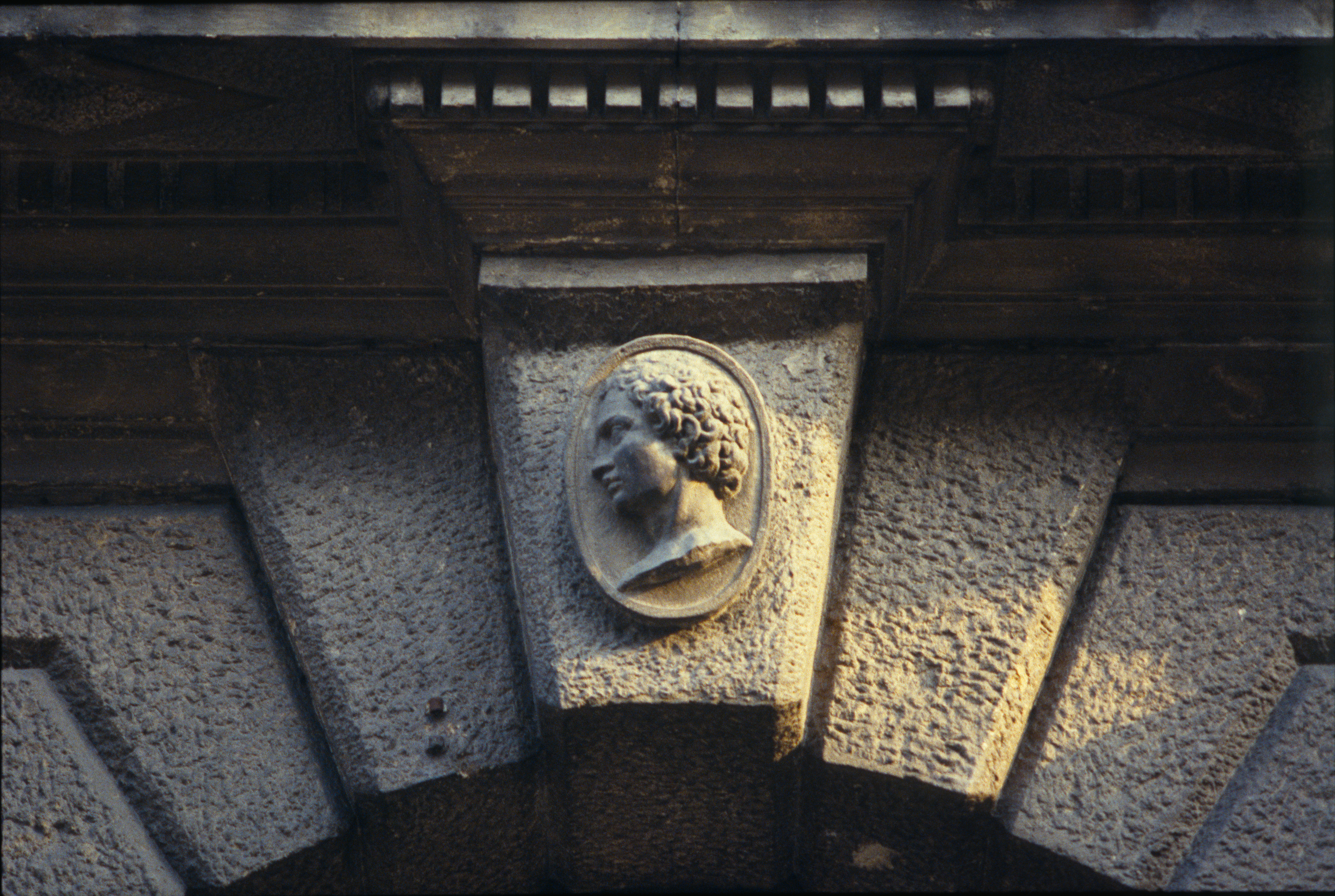
Main entrance Giusti's Palace keystone, with rustic quoins and face of man

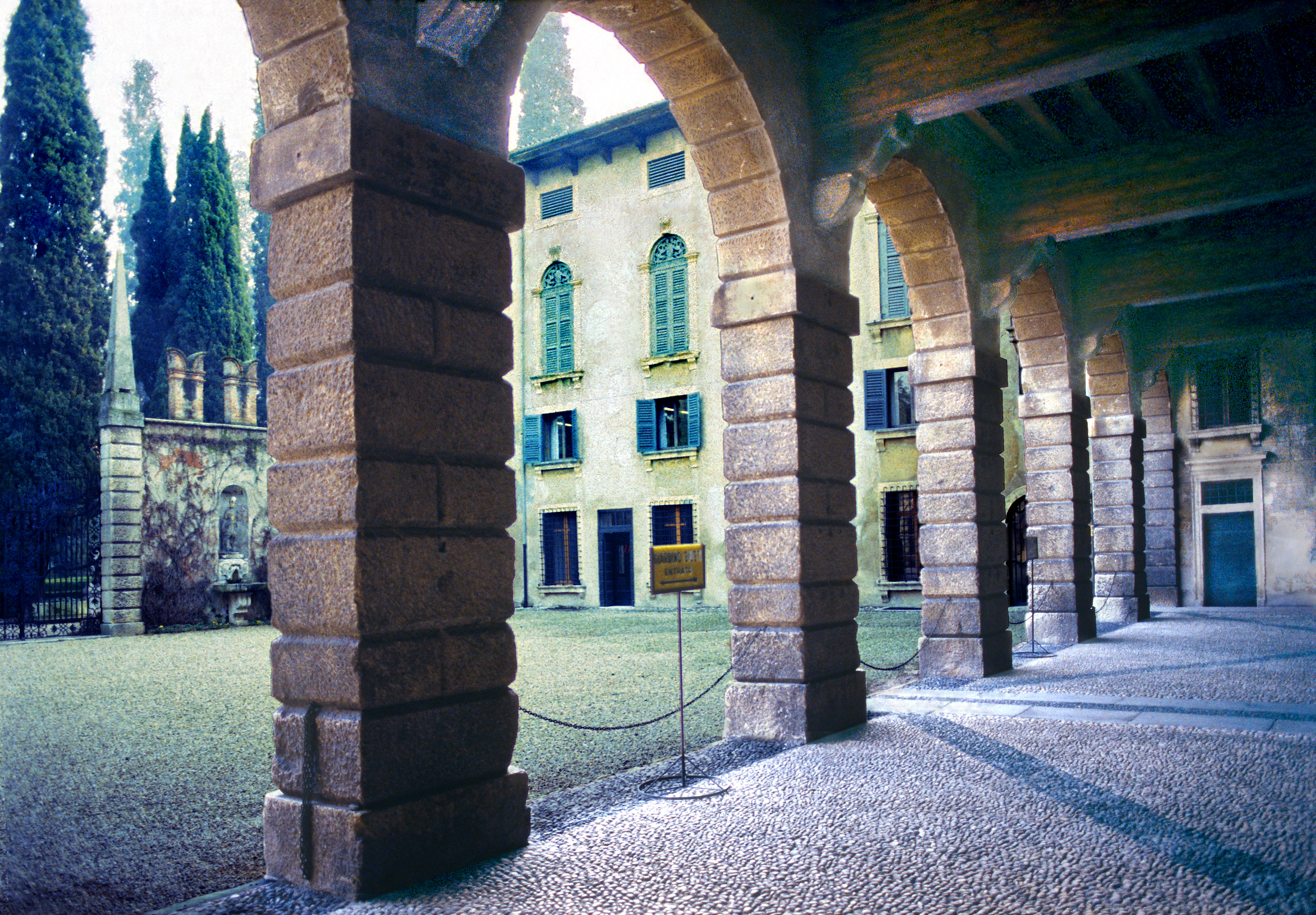
Giusti's Palace Porch

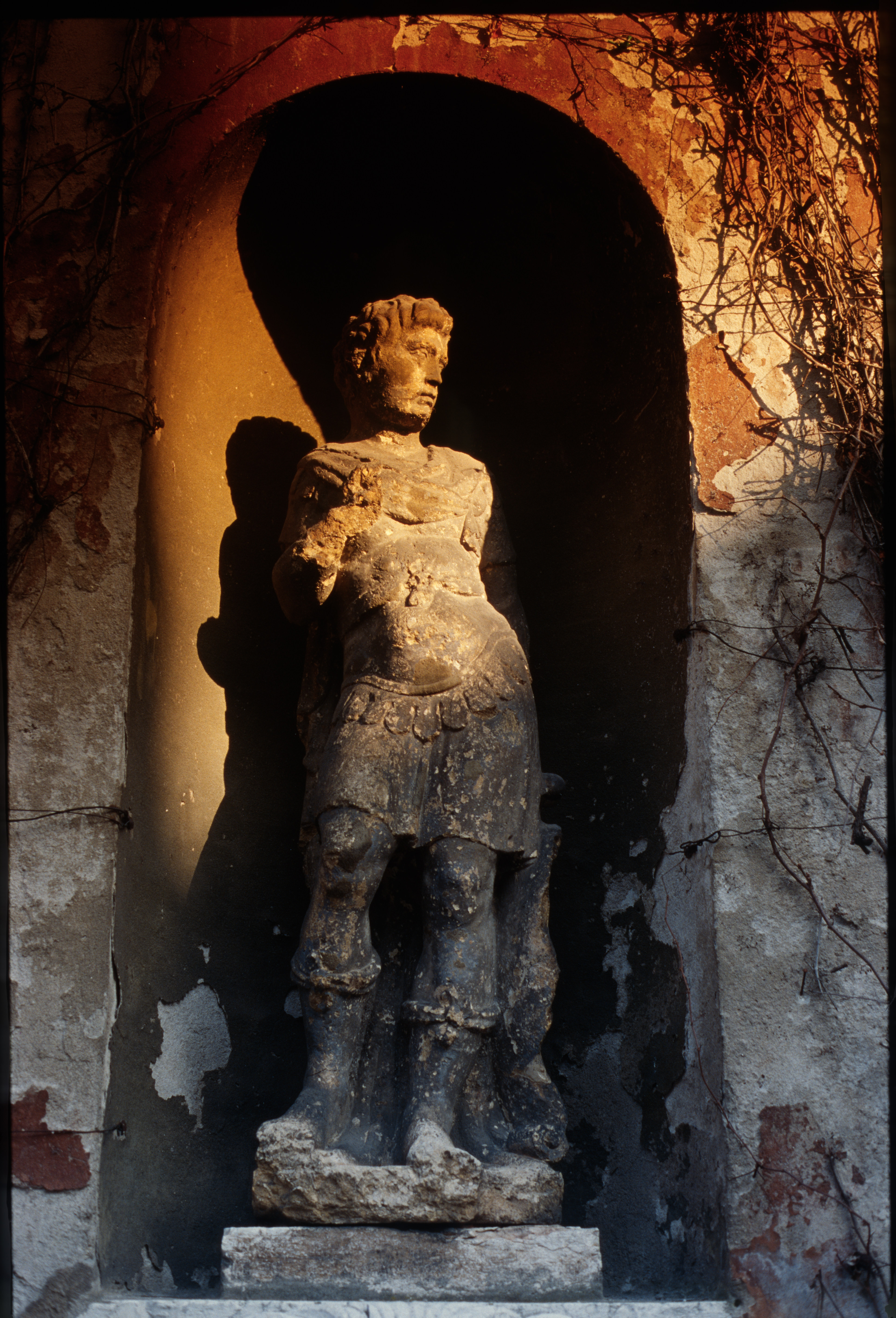
Apollo's sculpture, Palazzo Giusti Verona, Mannerism art with typical Contrapposto

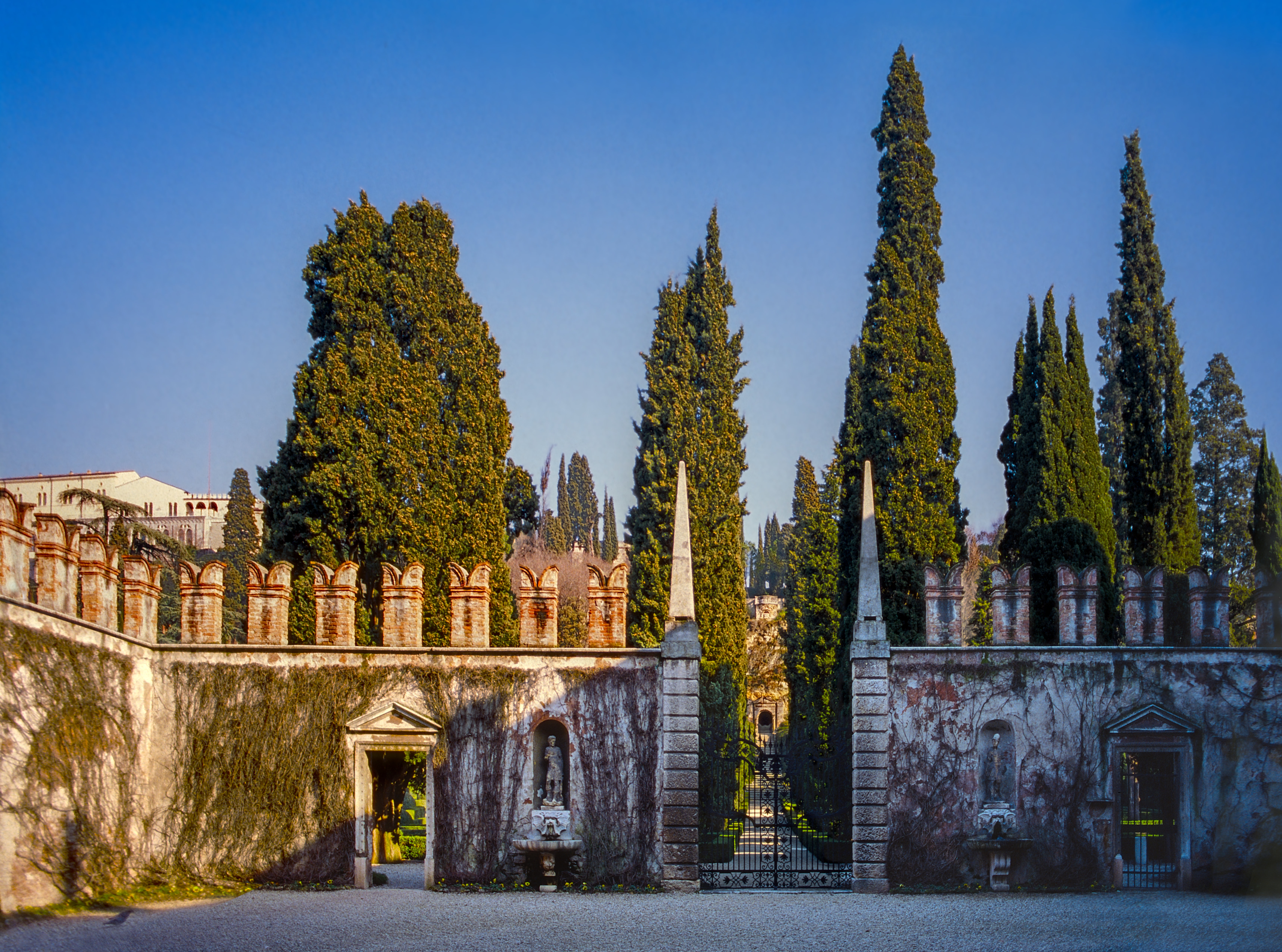
Courtyard and gate to the garden
