= Oratory of San Rocco, Padua =

Oratory in Padua, Italy

Coordinates: 45°24′31.5″N 11°52′31.22″E

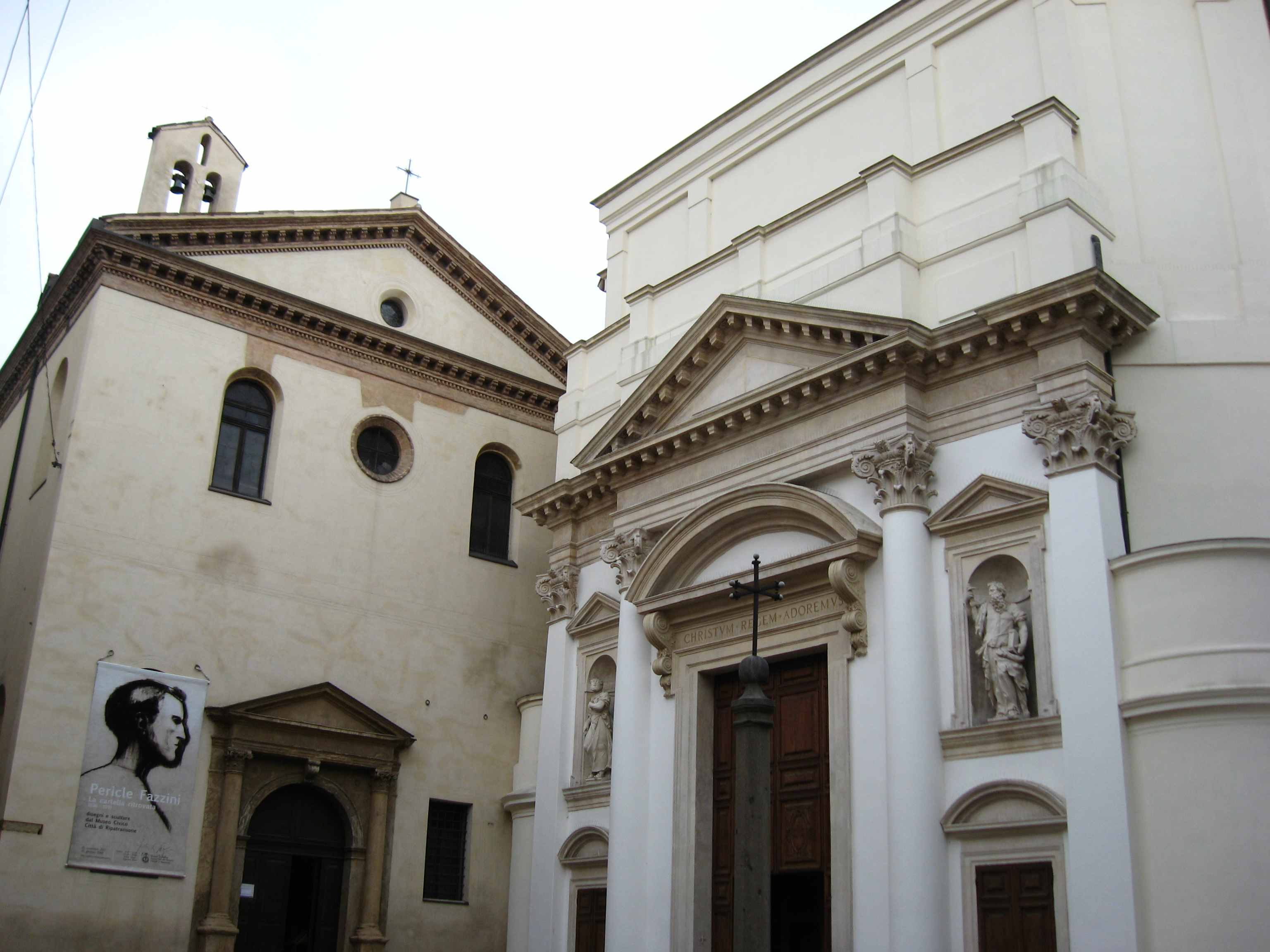
Facades of Santa Lucia (right) and the Oratory (left).

The Oratory of San Rocco (Oratory of St Roch) is a Renaissance style, Roman Catholic oratory located in the city center of Padua, region of Veneto, Italy. It arises adjacent to the church of Santa Lucia, and is notable for its collection of frescoes.

== History ==
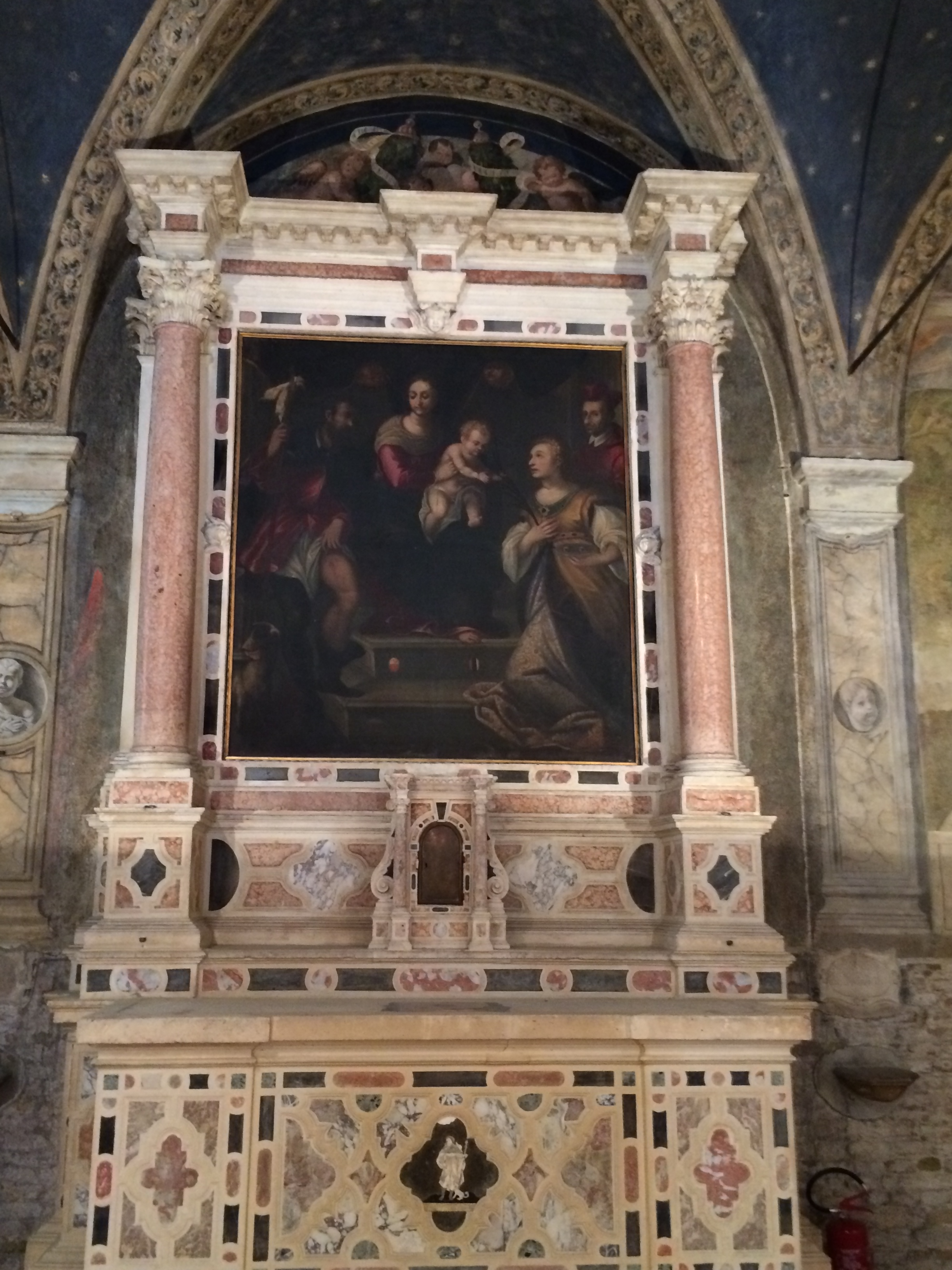
Main altarpiece

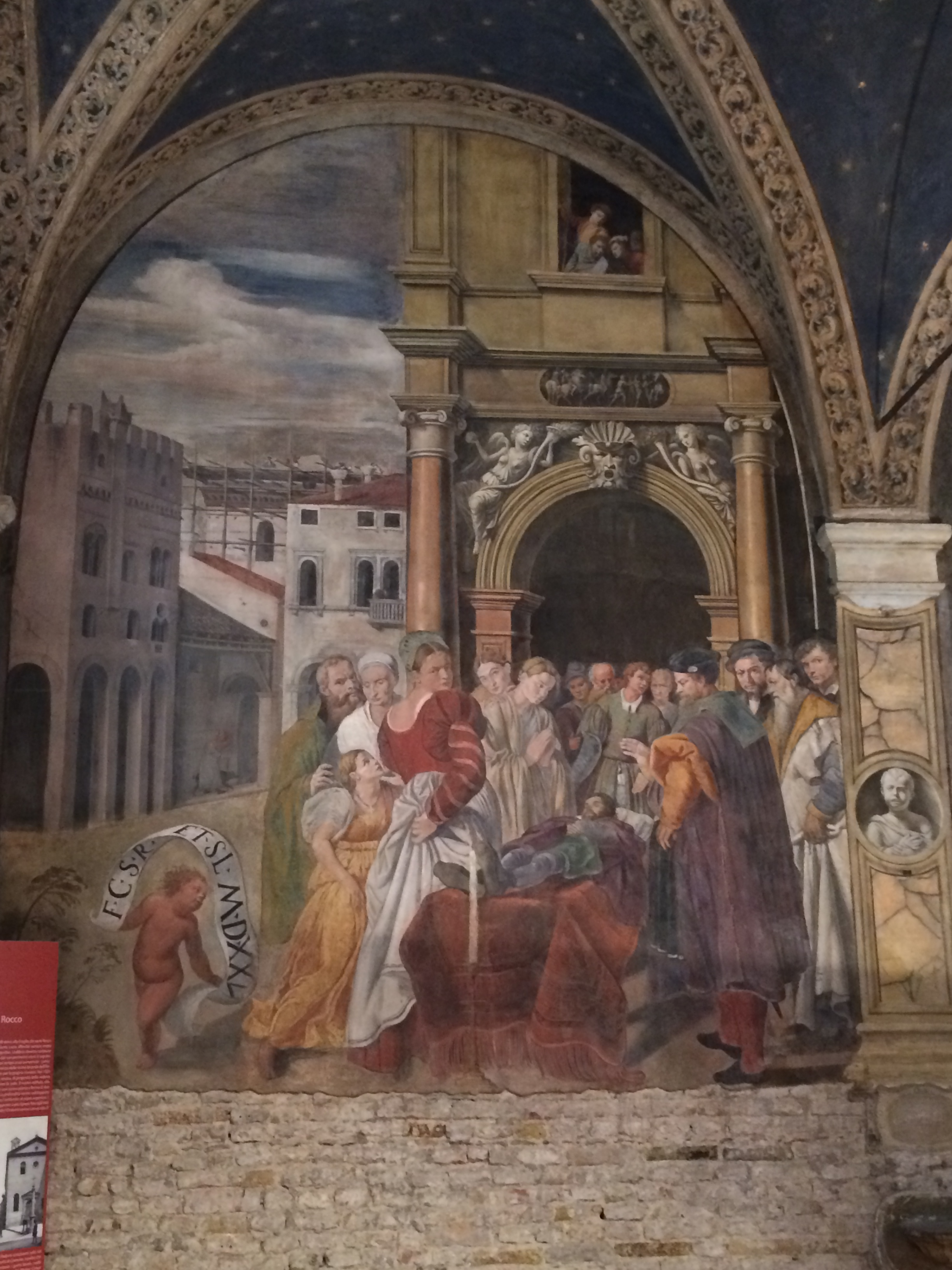
Fresco depicting a miracle by St Roch

The oratory arose at the site used as a church cemetery, but granted to confraternity of San Rocco. In 1525, construction began and was not completed until 1542. The lower hall of the oratory is richly frescoed with scenes of the life of St Roch. The frescoes were completed between 1536 and 1545 by the painters Domenico Campagnola, Girolamo Tessari, Gualtiero Padovano, and Stefano Dall'Arzere. Three of these artists also frescoed the oratory known as the Scuola del Carmine at the church of the Carmine in town. The main altar is made with polychrome marble, and the altarpiece on display is a Madonna with Saints (1697) by Alessandro Maganza. The oratory is now owned by the city, and used for exhibits. Restorations have been pursued in mid-1920s and in 1980s.
