= Santa Lucia, Padua =

Church building in Padua, Italy

Coordinates: 45°24′31.5″N 11°52′31.22″E

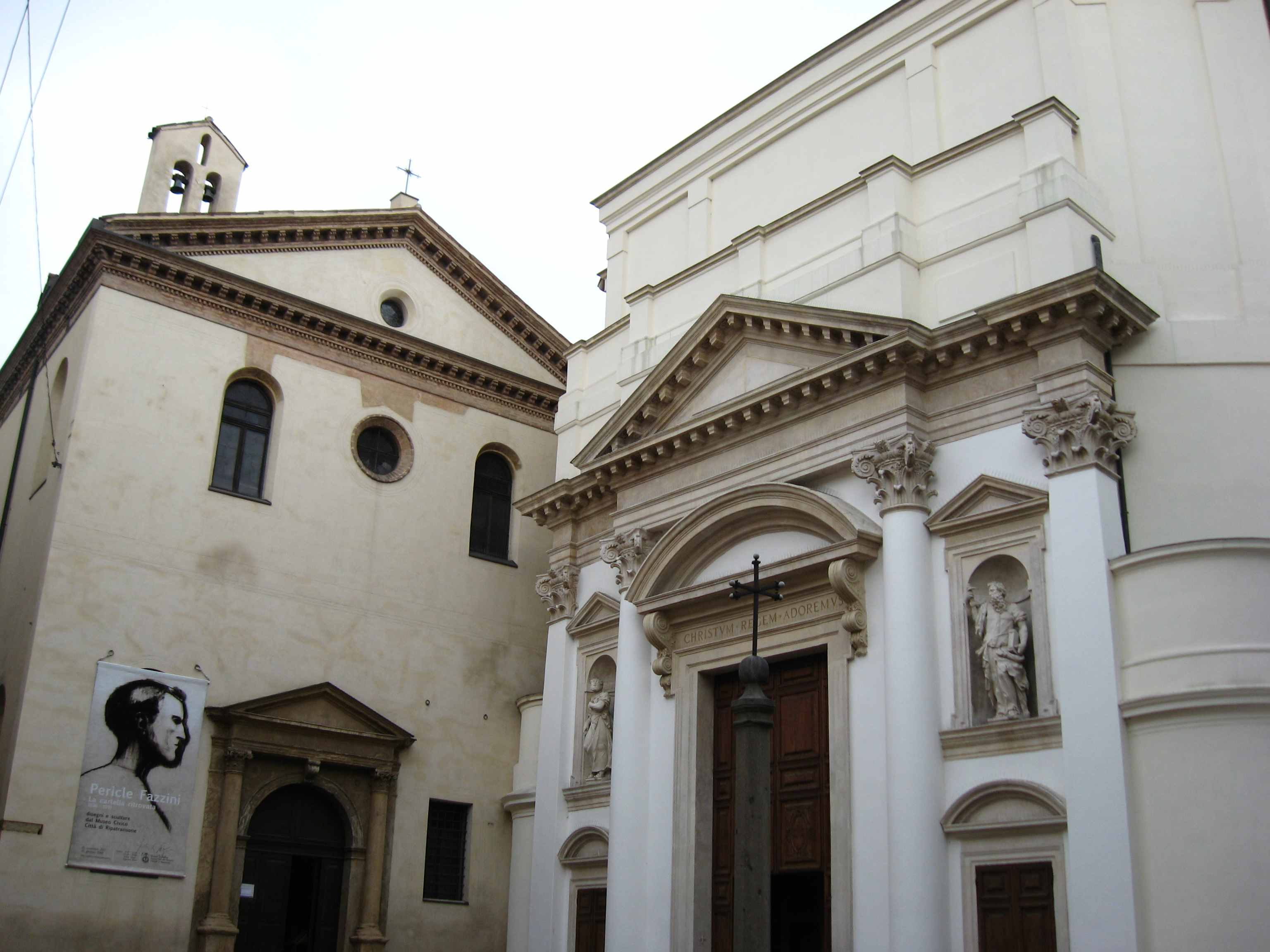
Facade with statues of St Lucy (right) and St Roch (left).

Santa Lucia, also called the Chiesa dell'Adorazione Perpetua is a Roman Catholic church located in the city of Padua, region of Veneto, Italy.

== History ==
A church at the site was present since the 10th century. It was rebuilt in the late 17th-century using designs by Girolamo Frigimelica Roberti, and completed by Sante Bonato. The brick façade has four columns of composite order. Flanking the portal are statues of Saints Peter and Paul by Giovanni Bonazza, and St Bartholemew by Giovanni's son, Antonio Bonazza. The statues of Saints Luke, Cristopher, Matthew, John, and Joseph were carved by Antonio da Verona.

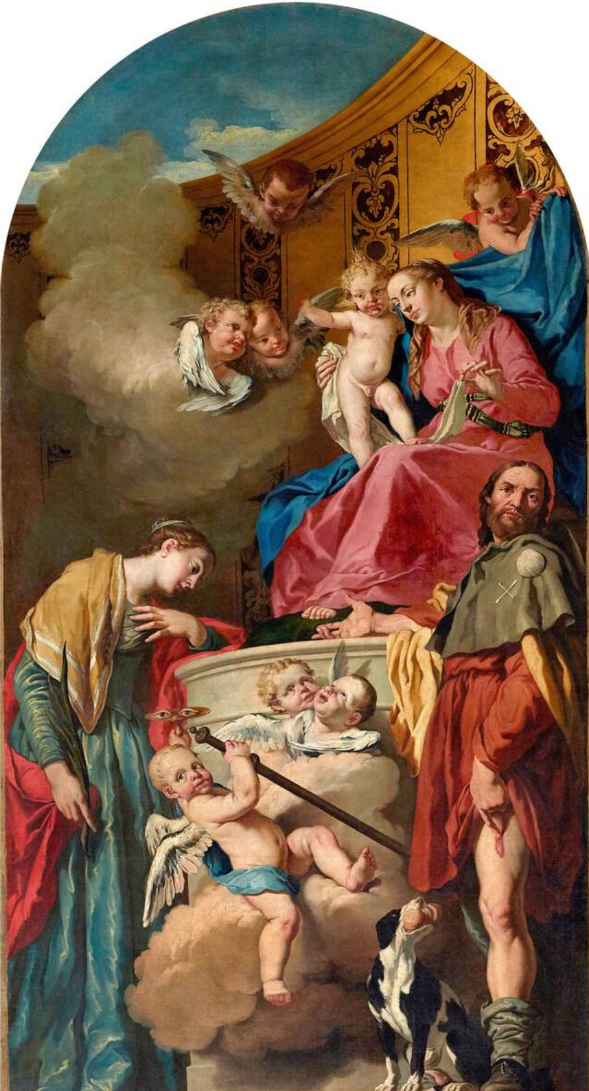
Virgin and Child with St. Lucy and St. Roch by Giacomo Ceruti

Inside, the church houses an altarpiece depicting the Incredulity of St Thomas by Alessandro Varotari; and in the presbytery, an altarpiece depicting the Church in Prayer and the Glory of the Eucharist (1959) by Amleto Sartori. Also in the presbytery is a St Luke by Giovanni Battista Tiepolo. The rigorous hall, illuminated by numerous thermal windows, is almost rectangular, although the angles are rounded to allow for the succession of Corinthian half-columns and twelve niches housing as many statues of the apostles (6 on the right and 6 on the left), works by Giovanni Bonazza, Antonio Bonazza, Giacomo Contiero, Antonio da Verona and Giuseppe Casetti. Corresponding to the niches are monochromes by Giacomo Ceruti depicting the four Evangelists (St. Luke is by Giovambattista Tiepolo), the four protectors of Padua and the four Doctors of the Latin Church. Also by Ceruti is the altarpiece on the high altar, depicting the Virgin and Child with St. Roch and St. Lucy now placed along the nave and replaced with a modern work by Hamlet Sartori (Praying Church and Glorification of the Eucharist).

To the left of the facade when facing the entrance of the church is the Oratory of San Rocco with 16th-century frescoes.
