= Giacomo Ceruti =

Italian painter (1698–1767)

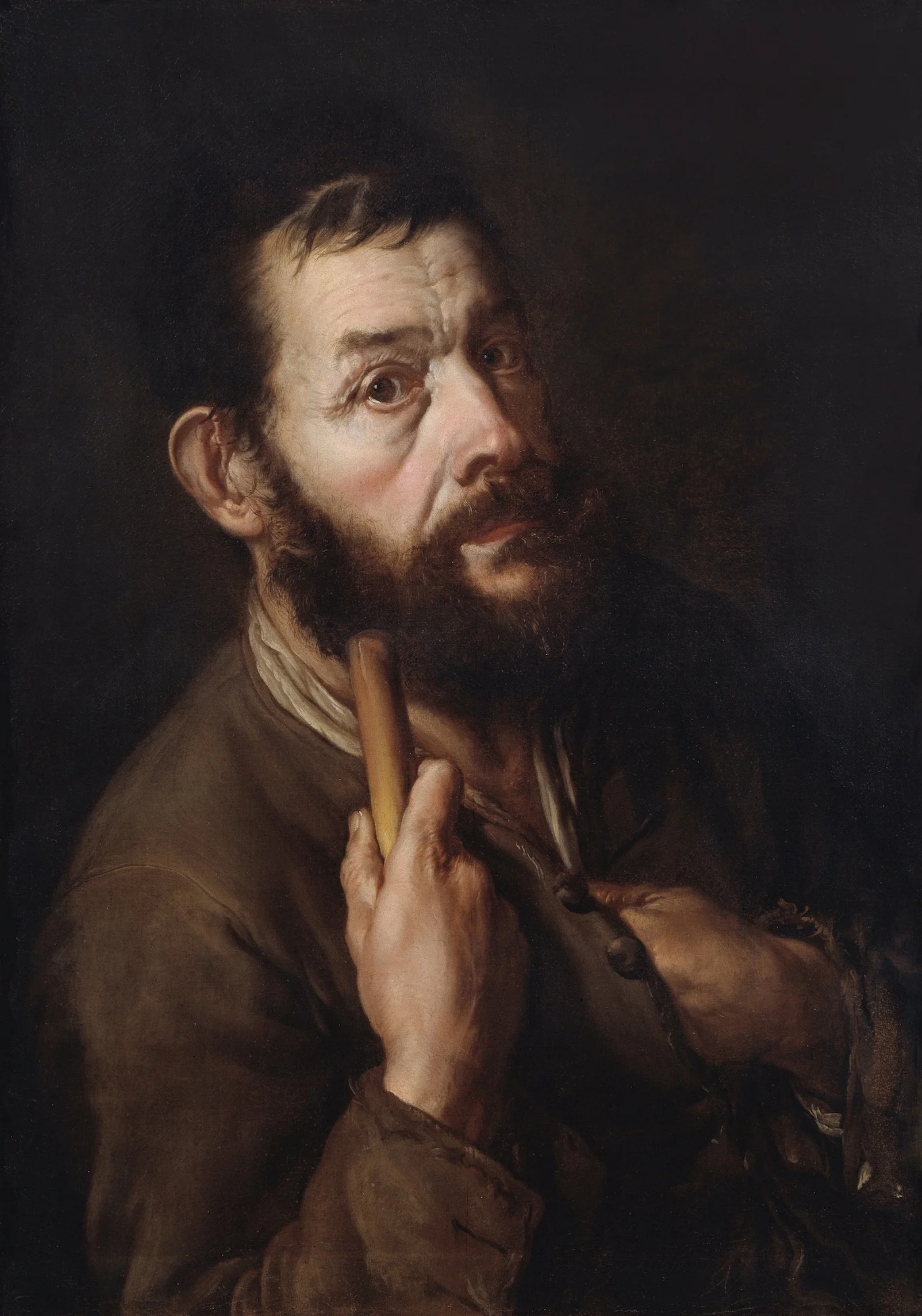
- Self-portrait as a pilgrim, 1737
- Born: Giacomo Antonio Melchiorre Ceruti; 13 October 1698; Milan
- Died: 28 August 1767 (aged 68)
- Known for: Painting
- Movement: Late Baroque

Giacomo Antonio Melchiorre Ceruti (13 October 1698 – 28 August 1767) was an Italian late Baroque painter, active in Northern Italy. He painted a variety of subjects, including portraits, religious and mythological scenes and still lifes. He is best known as a painter of large-scale genre scenes in which beggars, paupers, pilgrims, old people and simple craftsmen are depicted realistically in portrait form or engaged in their daily activities. This subject matter, which he treated with empathy, earned him the nickname Pitocchetto ('little beggar').

== Life ==
He was born in Milan. In 1711, he moved with his family, comprising his parents, a brother and four little sisters, to the town of Brescia, where they settled in the parish of Sant'Agata. The motives behind this move are unknown. Possibly the family had relatives in Brescia. While Ceruti commenced his artistic career in the city, it is likely that his initial artistic training had already started in Milan. This training was likely not a traditional apprenticeship in the form of copying painting examples and learning the principles of composition. His first attempts at history painting were rather clumsy, while he showed a great accomplishment in portrait and genre paintings. It is therefore likely that this initial training took place in contact with a Milan artist experienced in the latter two genres, such as the painter Antonio Lucini.

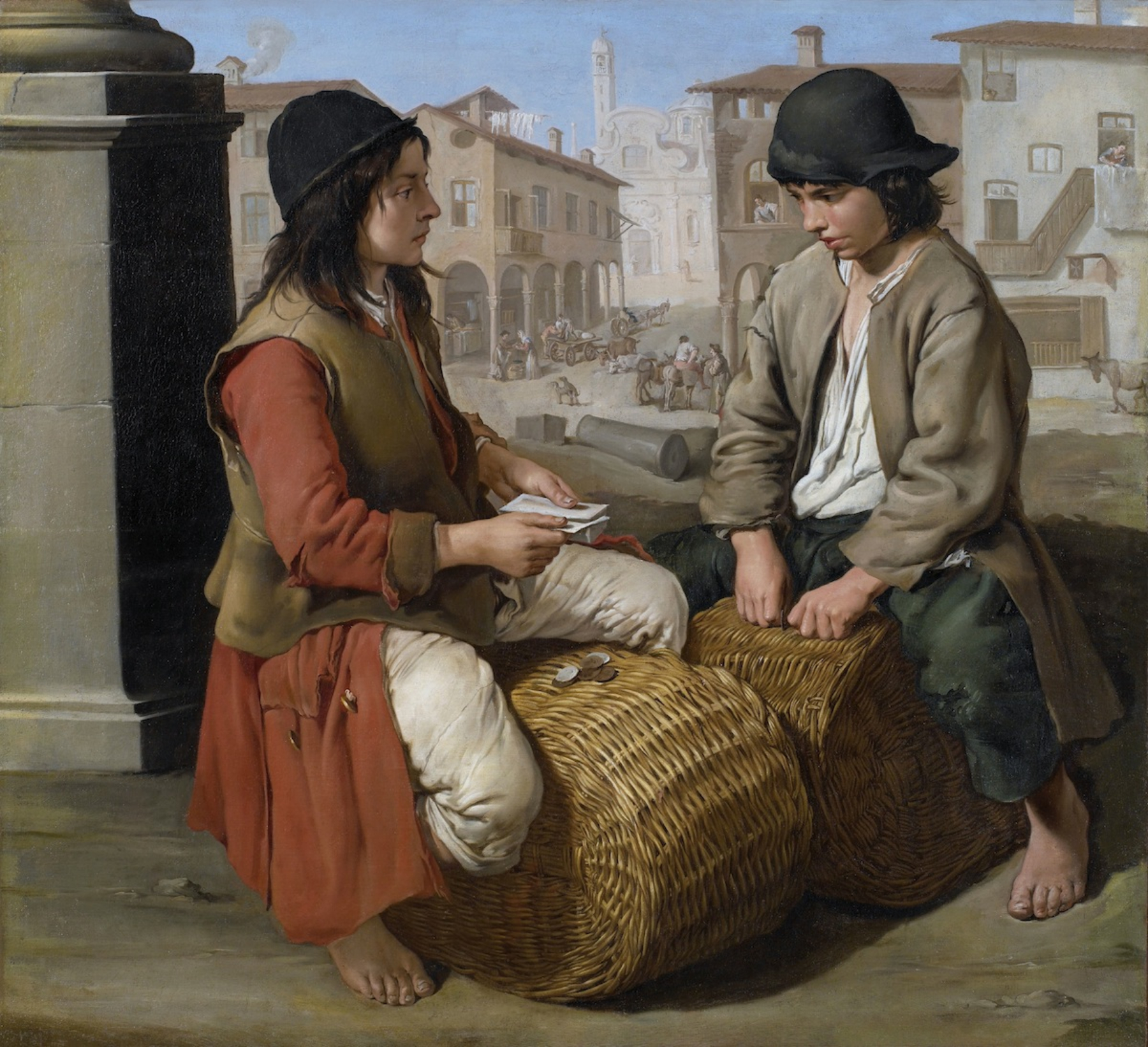
Porter boys playing cards on baskets

In 1717, at the age of 18, he married in Brescia Angiola Carozza, who was 10 years his senior. The couple had two children who both died in their infancy. From around 1721 to 1733, the artist is documented in Brescia. In 1723, he painted three altarpieces and four frescoes for the Saint Anthony Abbot parish church of Rino in Sonico in the Comunità montana di Valle Camonica (Brescia) for which he was paid in the form of a horse. The local nobility commissioned portraits and genre scenes from him. In 1724, he signed and dated his first known work, the Portrait of Count Giovanni Maria Fenaroli.

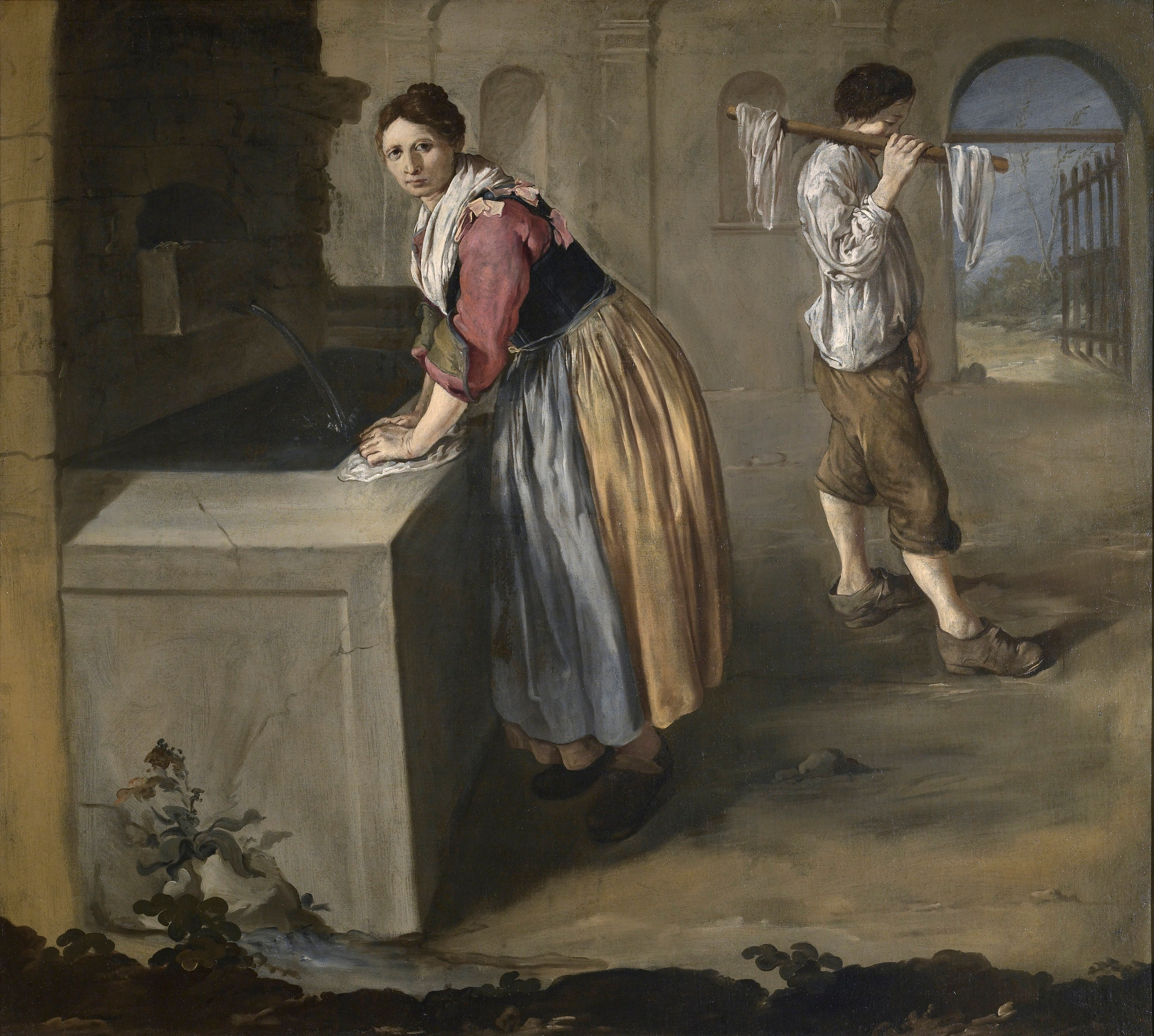
The Laundress (1735), Pinacoteca Tosio Martinengo, Brescia

In Brescia, he caught the attention of Andrea Memmo, the podestà who administered Brescia on behalf of Venice. Shortly before the expiration of his mandate in 1728, Memmo commissioned a series of 17 portraits of the past Venetian magistrates of Brescia to decorate the Palazzo del Broletto. These works were all lost or dispersed at the end of the 18th century. His patrons included some of the most prominent families of Brescia, such as the Fenaroli, the Avogadro, the Lechi and the Barbisoni, and of the Camonica Valley. Ceruti had a very close relationship with the Avogadro family, and in particular Giovanni, whose portrait Ceruti painted in 1730. Giovanni Avogadro put together the extensive family collection. He also acquired other works by Ceruti, including two paintings on glass and a portrait of a girl. The Avogadro patrimony merged in 1800 with the Fenaroli, who had also acquired 9 paintings by Ceruti in their city palace. These He also created altarpieces and Christian-themed paintings.

In 1733, he fled his creditors in Brescia and moved to Gandino. He had run up debts due to a failed investment in forest land for which he had taken out loans, which he had become unable to repay. He obtained commissions for works for the Basilica di Santa Maria Assunta in Gandino. For the cornice of the Basilica, Ceruti produced 28 paintings depicting prophets and characters from the Old Testament who are identified in the paintings. The series was not executed at the same time, and as a result, those conserved at the entrances dated 1734 are executed in a late 17th-century style, while the others, dated to 1737, show the influence of Ceruti's study of the works of Tiepolo and Sebastiano Ricci. The Basilica conserves 12 other works by Ceruti, making it his most complete cycle. In 1734, he signed and dated the Our Lady of the Rosary for the Visitazione di Santa Maria ad Elisabetta Church.

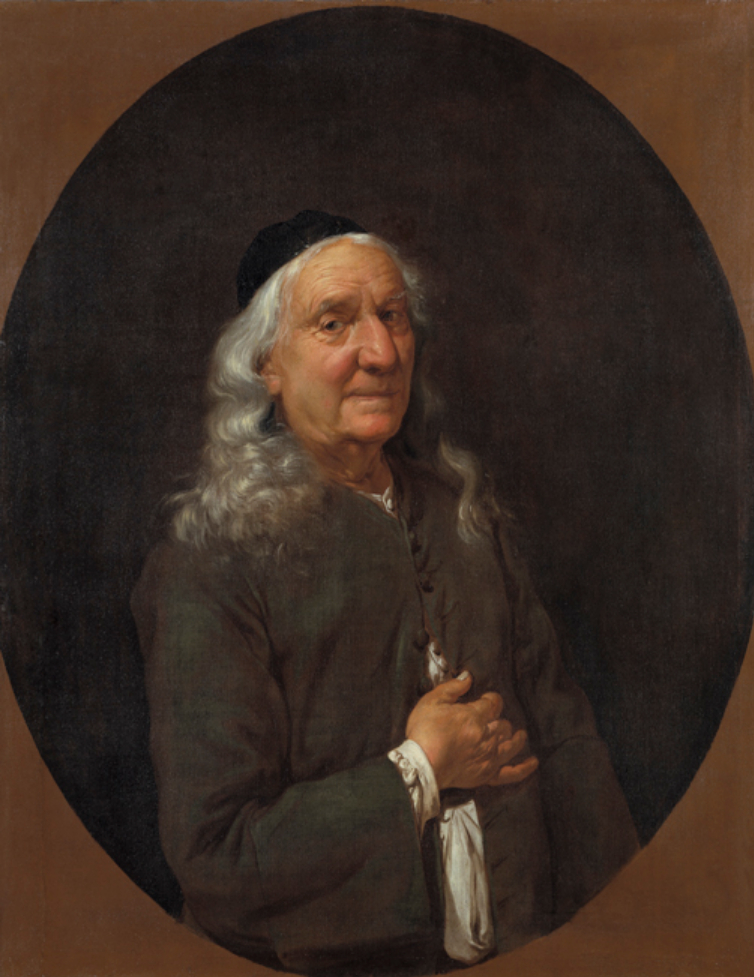
Portrait of count Giovanni Maria Fenaroli

He visited Venice in 1736 at the invitation of Johann Matthias von der Schulenburg, marshal of the Venetian Republic and an avid art collector. Ceruti painted portraits, landscapes, still lifes and scenes with paupers for the marshal. Through the marshal, he came into contact with an artistic milieu with international tastes, resulting in a profound maturation in his pictorial language. During his stay in Venice, he was further able to study the works of Venetian artists such as Giovanni Battista Tiepolo and Giovanni Battista Pittoni, which would influence his later works. In this period, he obtained an important commission to paint an altarpiece for the Basilica of Saint Anthony of Padua.

Ceruti probably met the young bookseller Matilde De Angelis in Schulenburg's milieu. She became his mistress, and the couple had a daughter in 1737 and two further children later. All of their offspring died at a young age. He remained married to his wife while maintaining his relationship with his mistress, with whom he moved around in different cities in northern Italy.

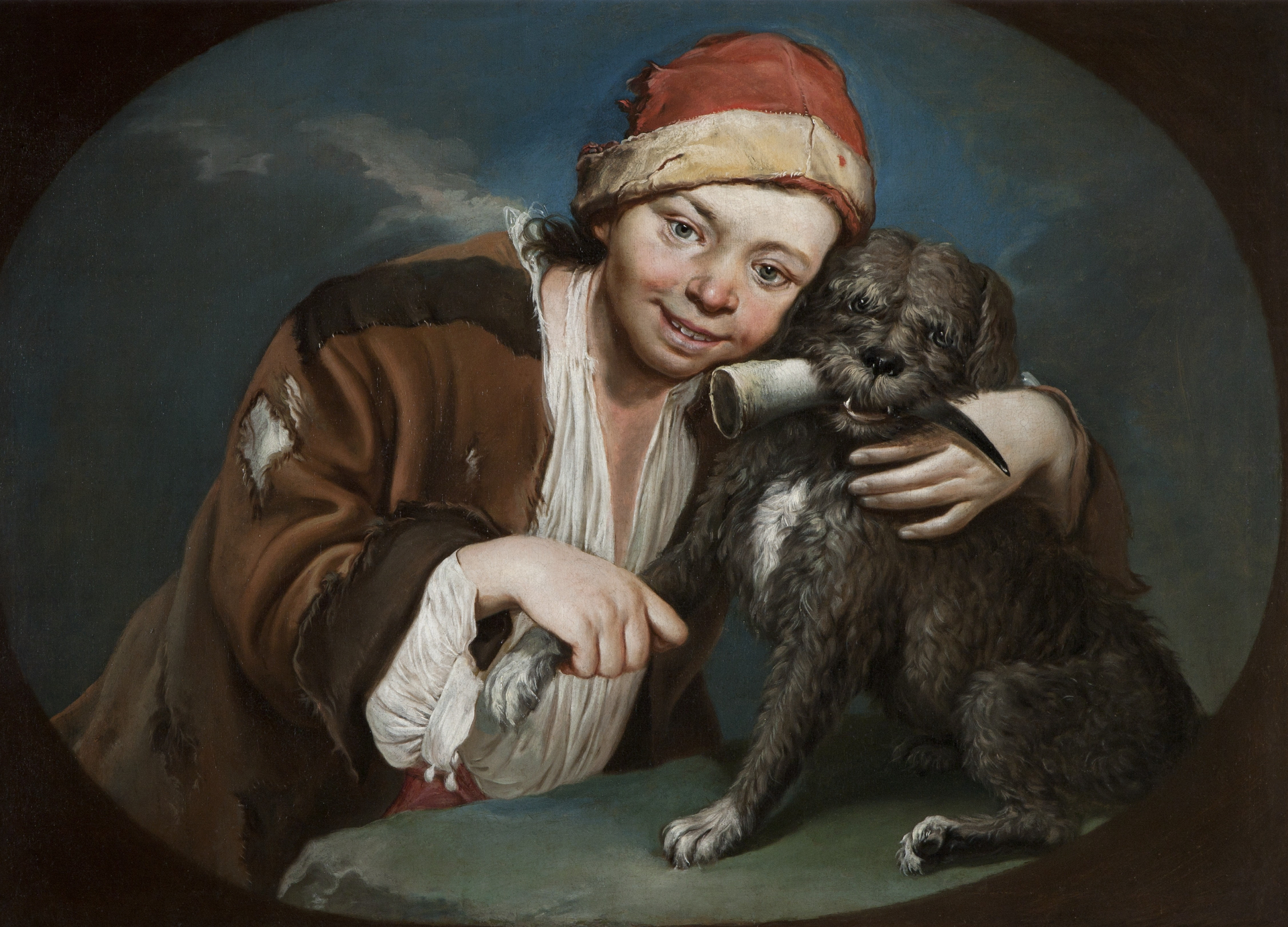
Boy with a dog, Ulster Museum

After his stay in Venice, Ceruti went back to work in Gandino. In 1742, he moved with his mistress to his birthplace, Milan. His first wife continued to reside in Brescia. In Milan, he obtained the patronage of some of the leading families, including the Belgioioso, the Medici di Marignano and the Litta. They commissioned him to paint their portraits and pastoral idylls in which the humble classes were depicted in an Arcadian vision. He also started painting mythological subjects for which he relied on prints by Northern European artists.

He received commissions from patrons in Piacenza. He painted in 1745 the Saint Alexander of Bergamo overturns a pagan altar as an altarpiece for the church of Sant'Alessandro in Piacenza (now in the Santa Teresa di Carmelo, Piacenza). He also worked in 1750 in Tortona, where he created a set of no less than six works with life-like figures and different subjects. One of these was inspired by an illustration of a fable by La Fontaine. In December 1762, Ceruti drafted a will in which he named his lawful wife as his sole heir, although his mistress was still alive. Three years later, he dictated a new will, in which he left his estate to his adopted son. He died in Milan on 28 August 1767 in the company of his lawful wife.

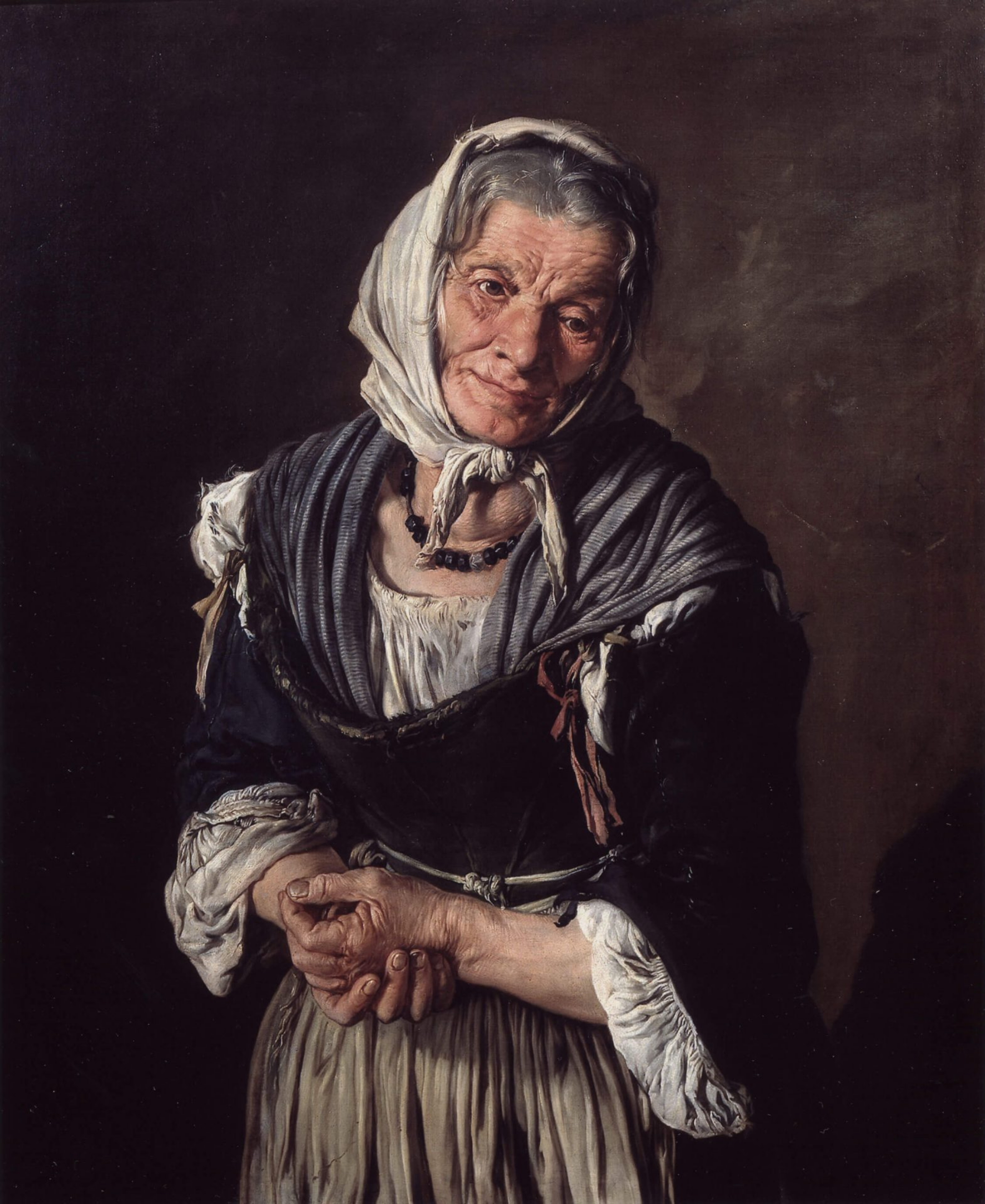
Portrait of an old woman

== Work ==
While he also painted portraits, still-life paintings, religious, mythological and even battle scenes, Ceruti is best known for his genre paintings, especially of beggars and the poor, whom he represented realistically and endowed with an unusual dignity and individuality. Ceruti gave particular attention to this subject matter during the period 1725 to 1740, and about 50 of his genre paintings from these years survive. Generally, a stylistic break in his career was caused by his residence in the Veneto from 1736 to 1742. He abandoned his sober palette with a preference for ocher for vivid colors, which he applied with fluid brushstrokes and imbued with light.

While Ceruti's paintings of lower-class subjects stand in a tradition of Northern Italian realist painting, Ceruti distances himself from this tradition, which often treated the poor with the intent to ridicule or to provide a moral lesson. He depicts his humble subjects in large canvases, giving them a monumental aspect and a pronounced individuality. Ceruti depicts the sitters in a manner in which they appear as individuals rather than generic types, as is typically the case in genre painting. He used a sober palette of dusty, toned-down grays, ochers, and beiges, applied with thin brushstrokes and avoided any sentimentality in their expressions. Through this sobriety them he shows a degree of empathy that is rarely found in European painting of the time. Ceruti's influences include Northern painters such as the Le Nain brothers and their pupil Jean Michelin, as well as the little-known Brescian painter Pietro Bellotti.

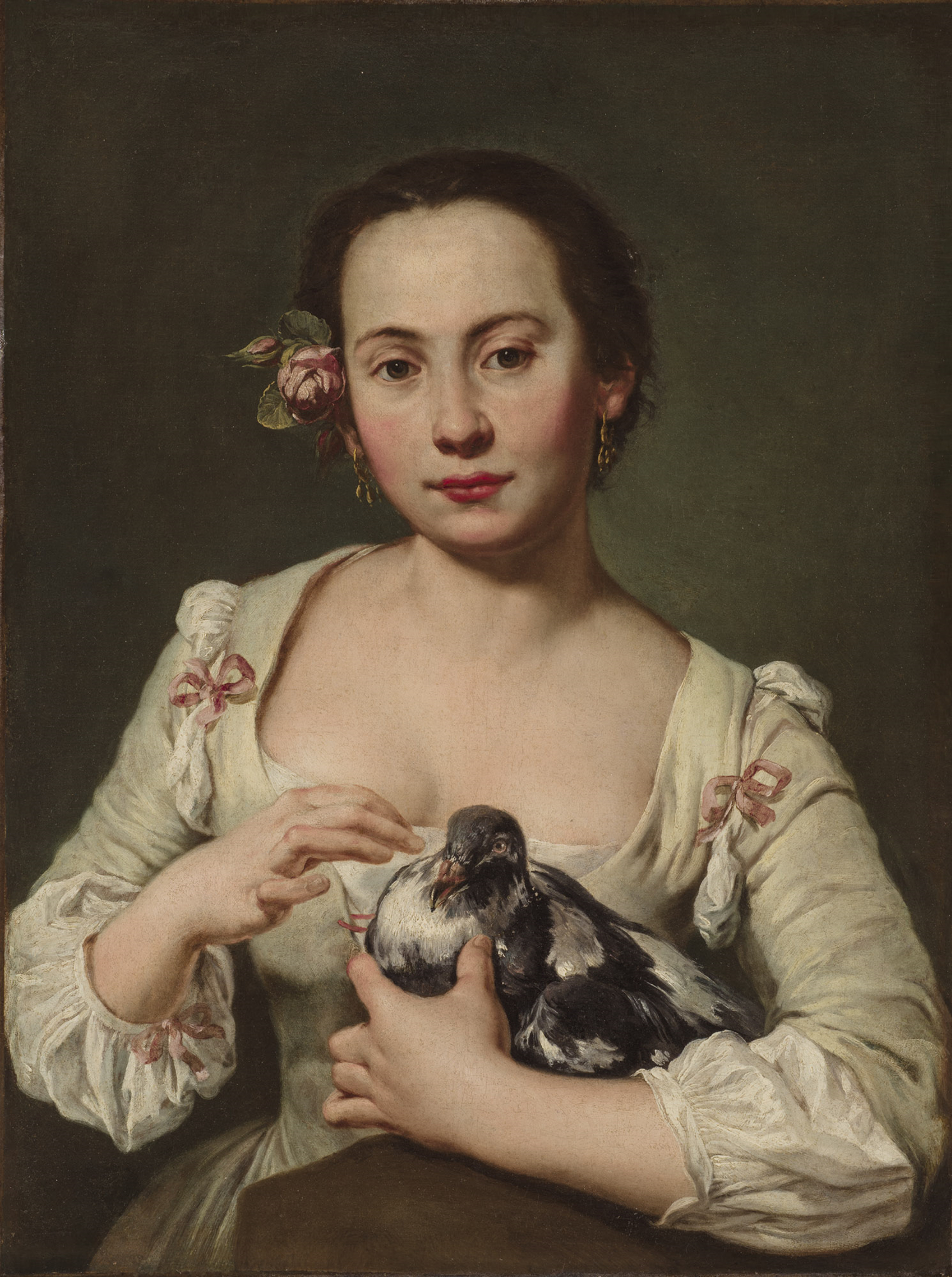
Young woman with a dove

Characteristic for his portrait painting are his Woman with a Dog (Metropolitan Museum of Art) and the Young woman with a dove (Wadsworth Atheneum) which portray a rather plain subject sympathetically and without idealization. Like most of his figures, the sitters appear before an undifferentiated dark background. When Ceruti attempted to represent deep space, the results were frequently awkward. His landscape backgrounds resemble stage flats and are often copied from print sources, such as the engravings of Jacques Callot. The realism Ceruti brought to his genre paintings also distinguishes his portraits and still lifes, while it is less apparent in his somewhat conventional decorative paintings for churches, including frescoes for the Basilica Santa Maria Assunta of Gandino and an altarpiece for Santa Lucia in Padua.

Ceruti started practising still life painting from the 1730s. He innovated, in particular, the still life genre of uncooked food on a table top. He created spare compositions in a naturalist style which developed on the work of still life specialists active in Northern Italy, such as Jacob van der Kerckhoven and Giovanni Agostino Cassana.

In 2025, his Portrait of a Lady was discovered in Argentina, South America, having been looted by the Nazis during World War II. It was briefly misattributed to Fra Galgario.

== Gallery ==
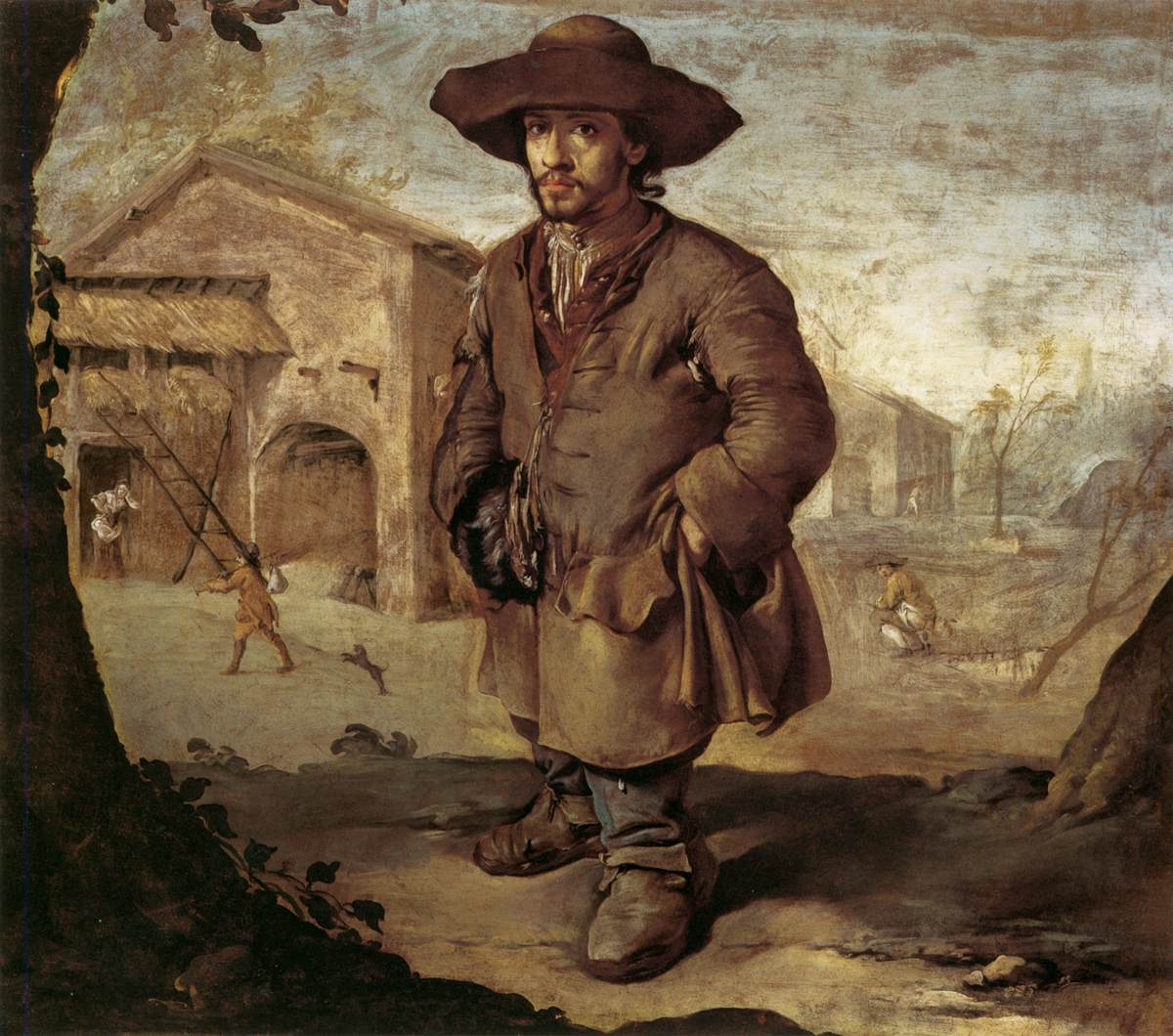
Dwarf (1720s), private collection

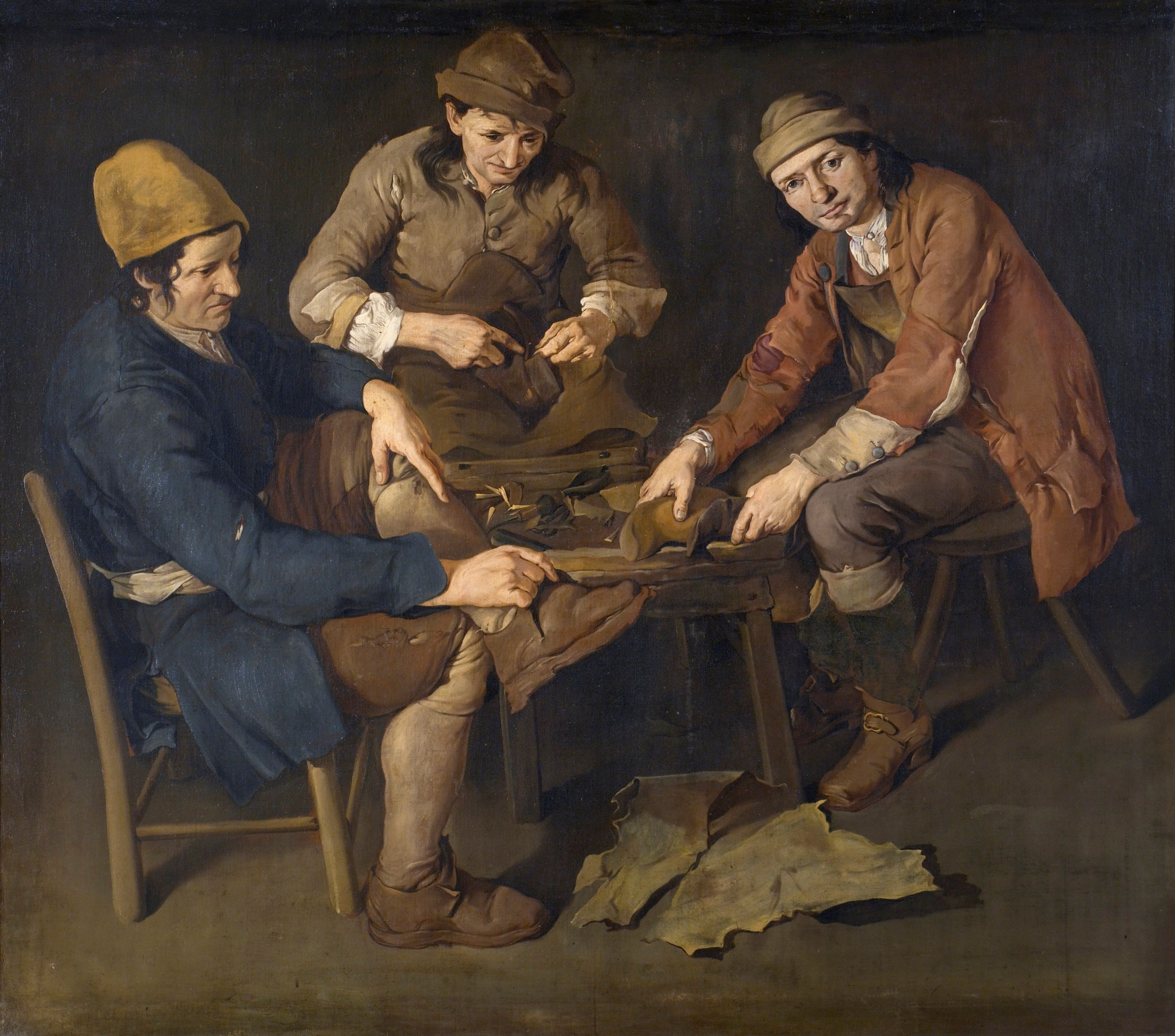
Shoemakers (c. 1727), Pinacoteca Tosio Martinengo, Brescia

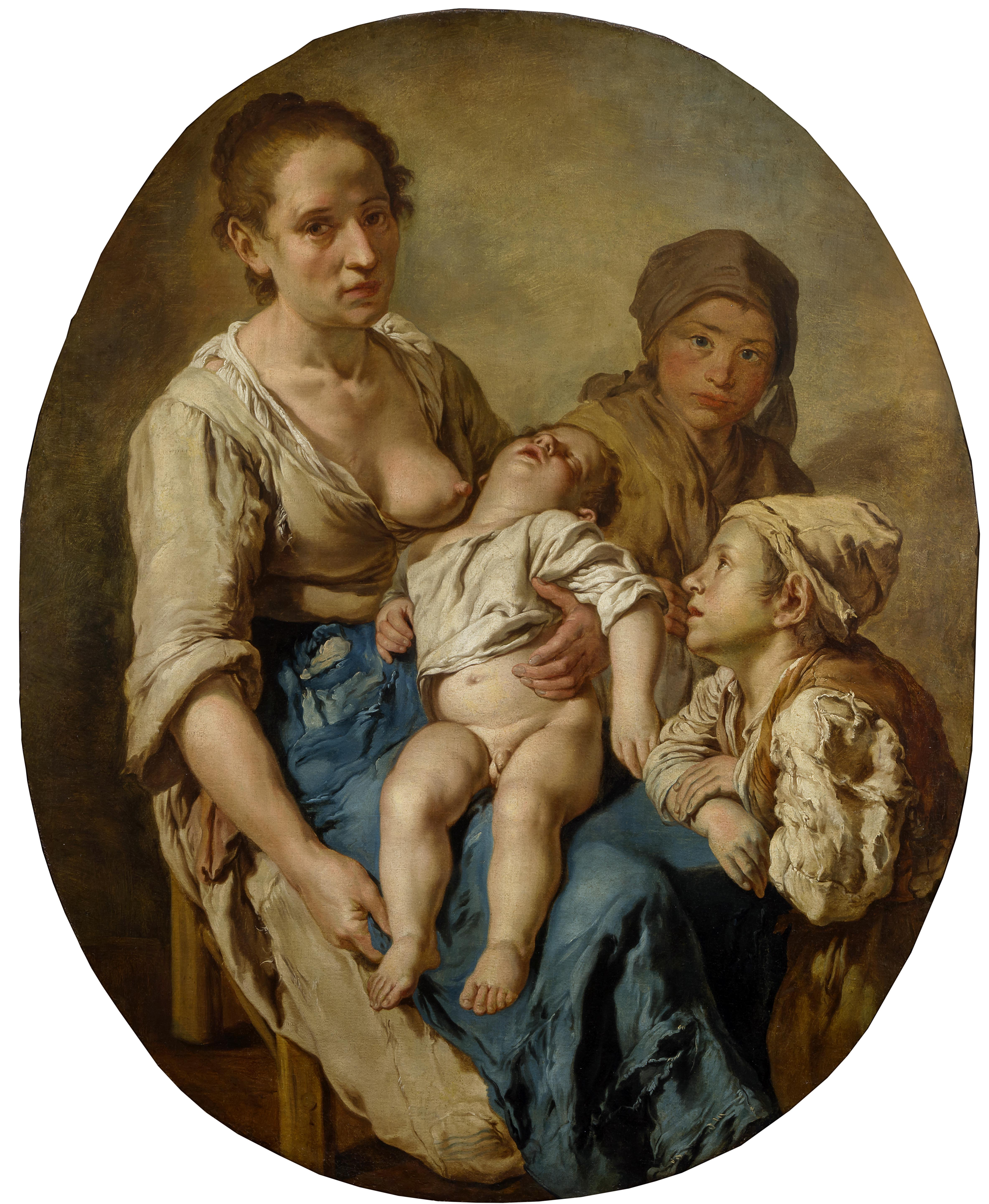
Mother with her children (c. 1733), private collection

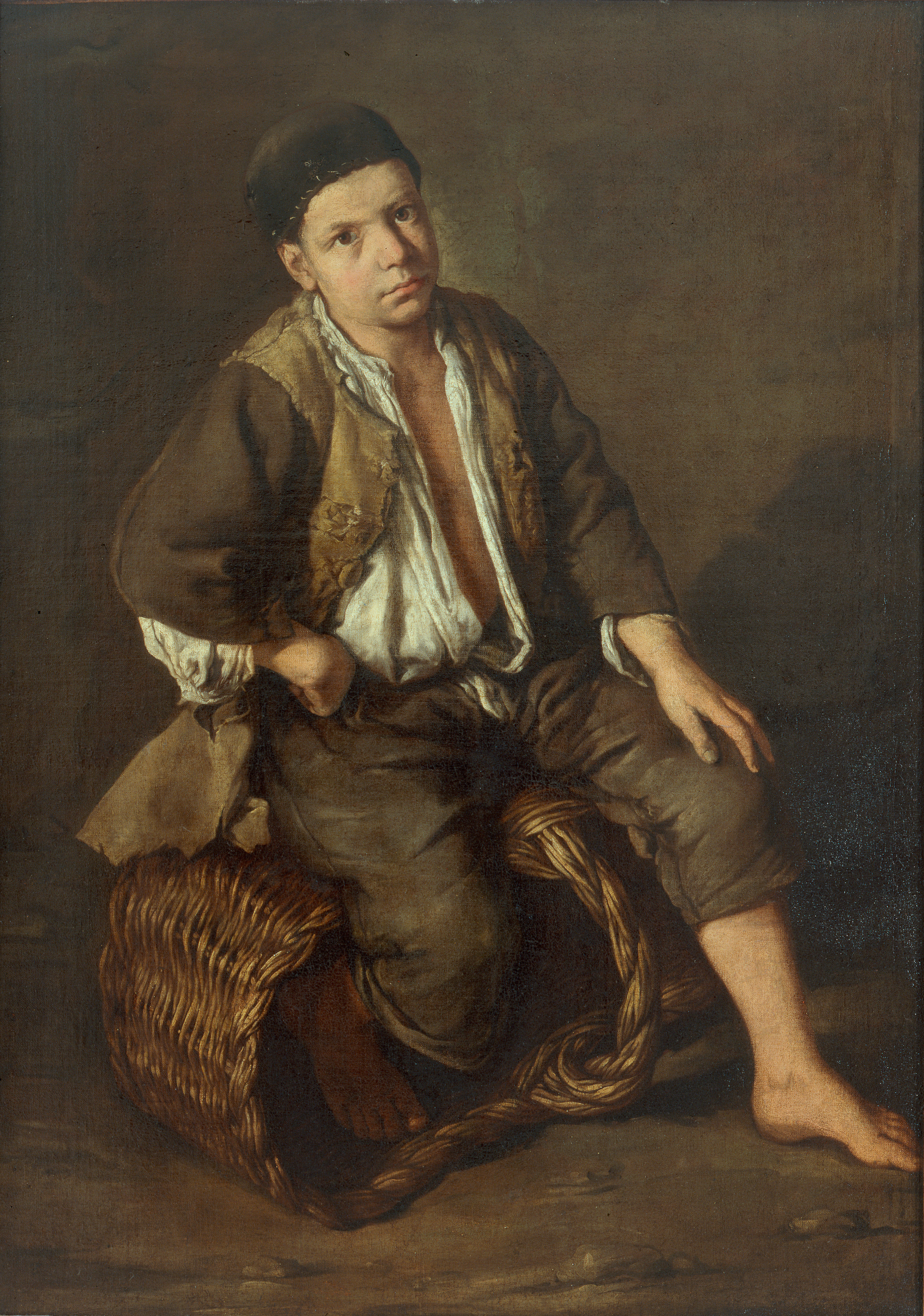
Porter sitting on a basket (c. 1735), Pinacoteca di Brera, Milan

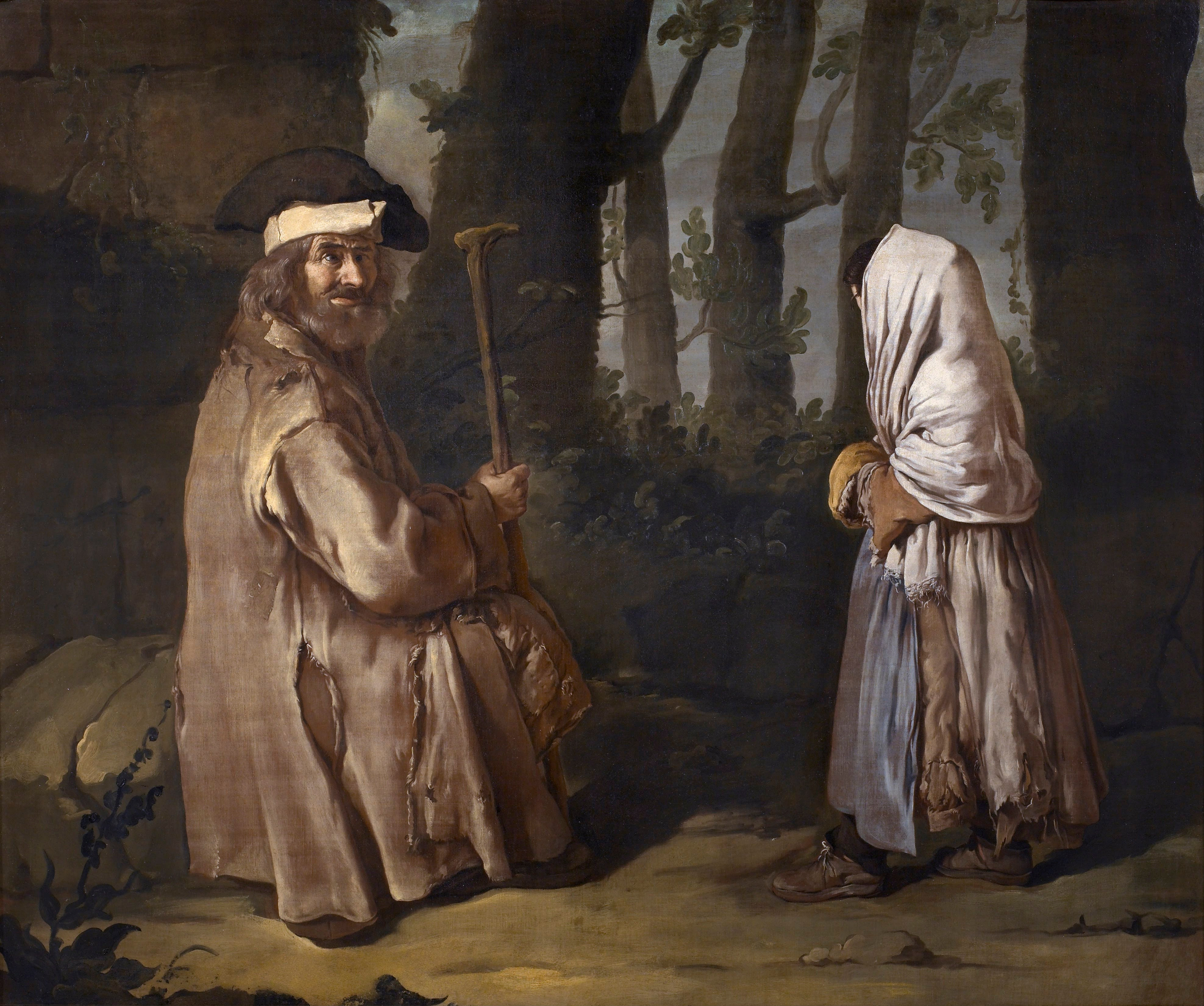
Two Beggars in a Wood

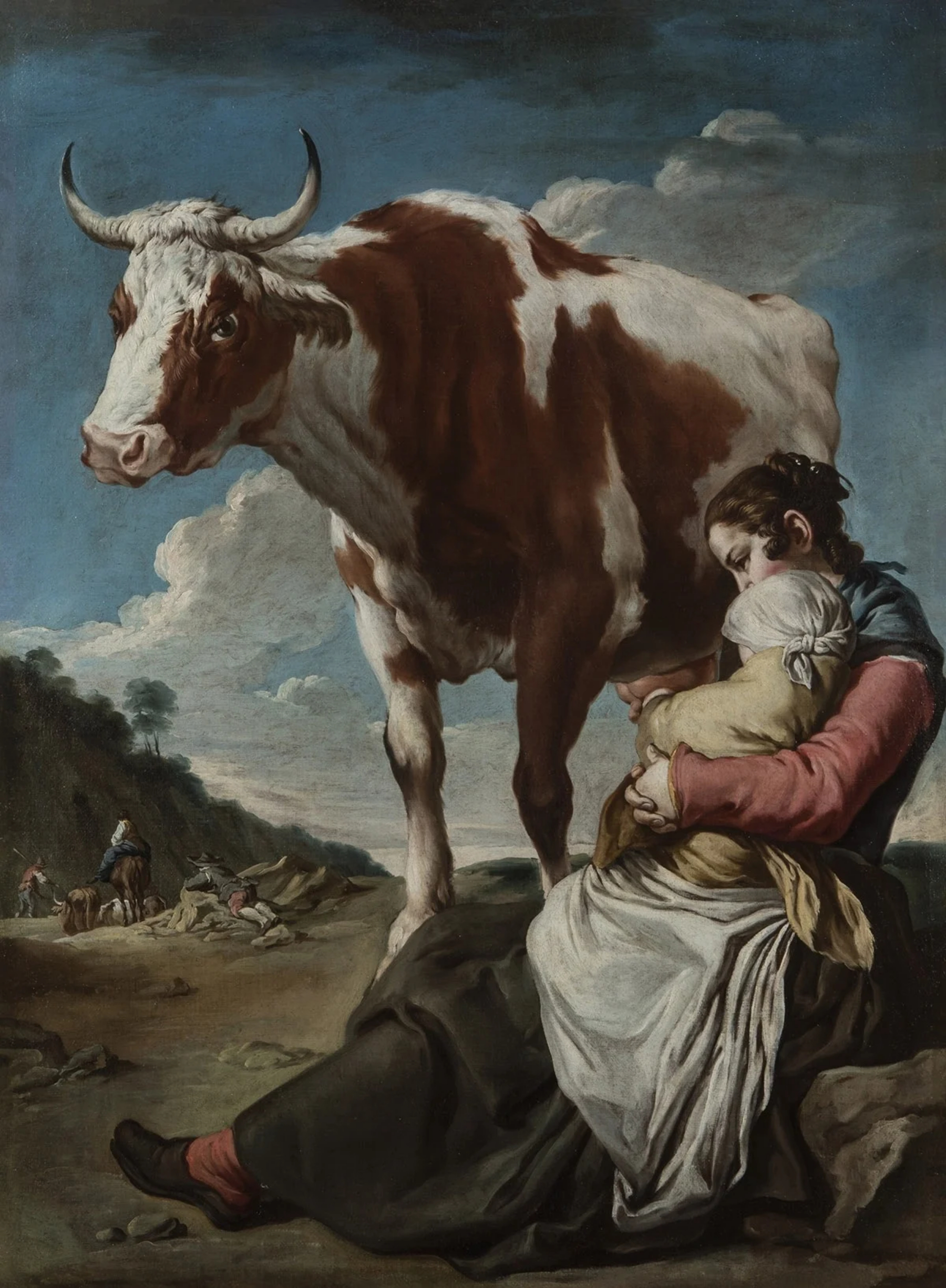
Mother and child with a cow in a rocky landscape

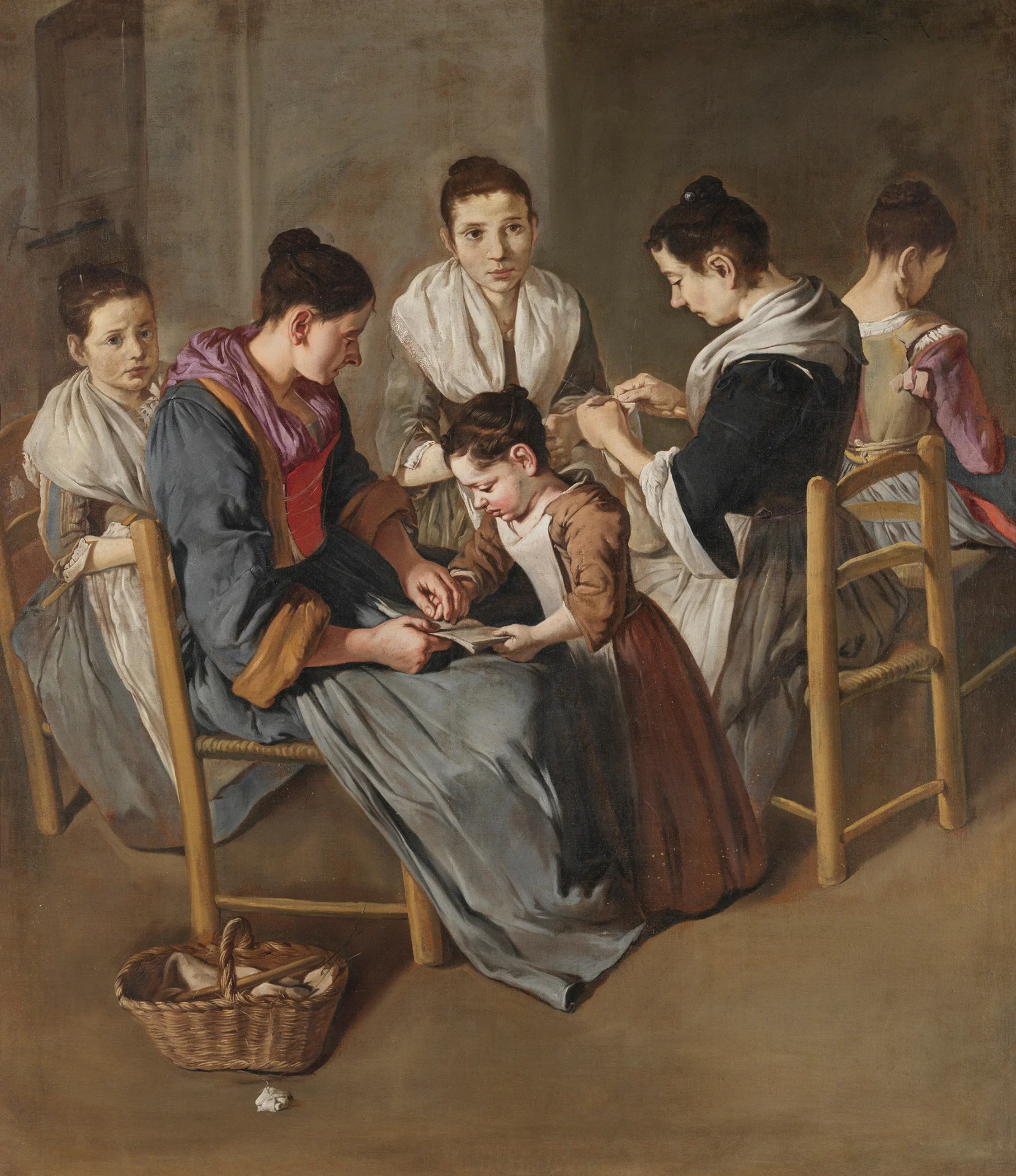
Girls' School

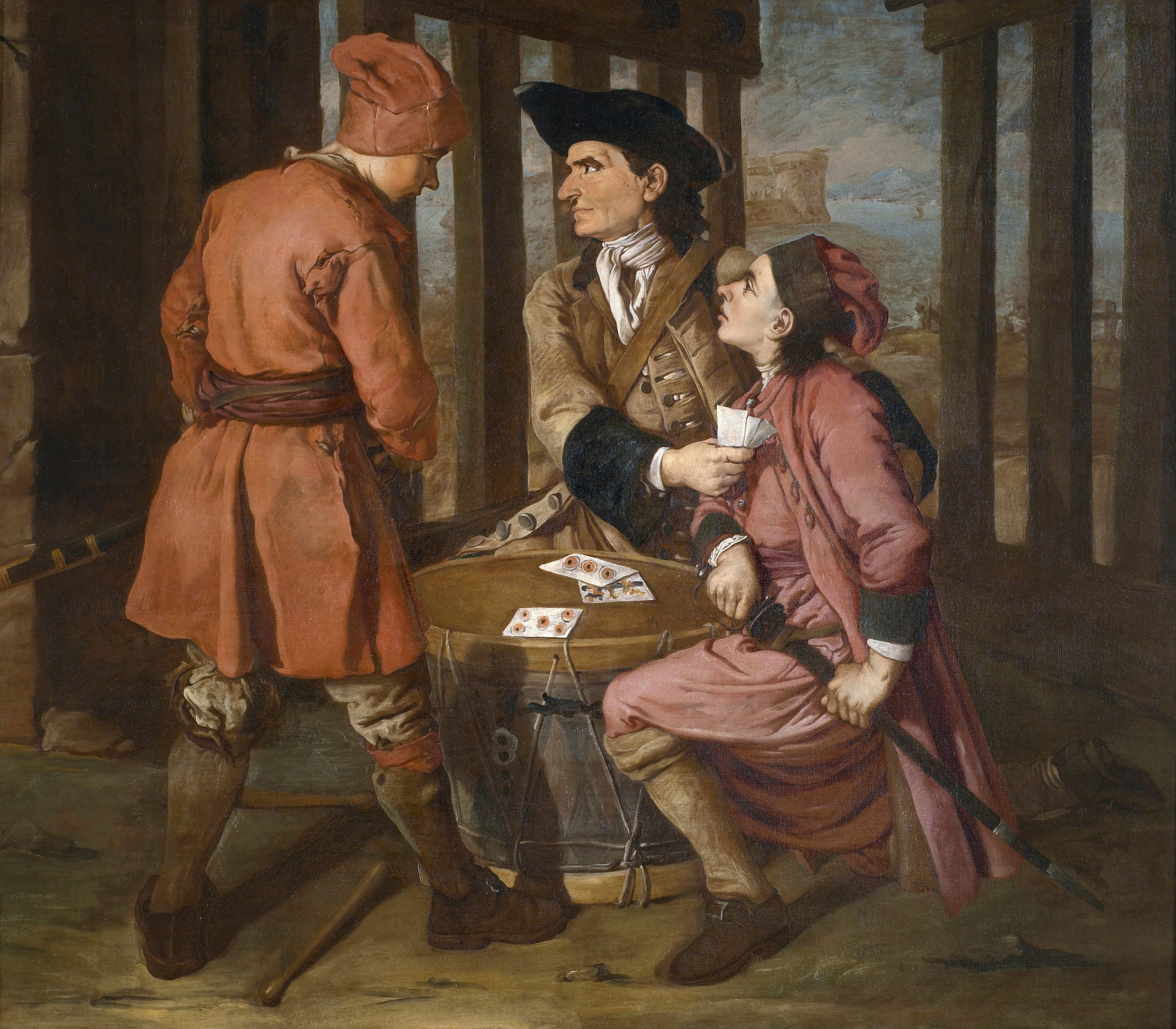
Card Players

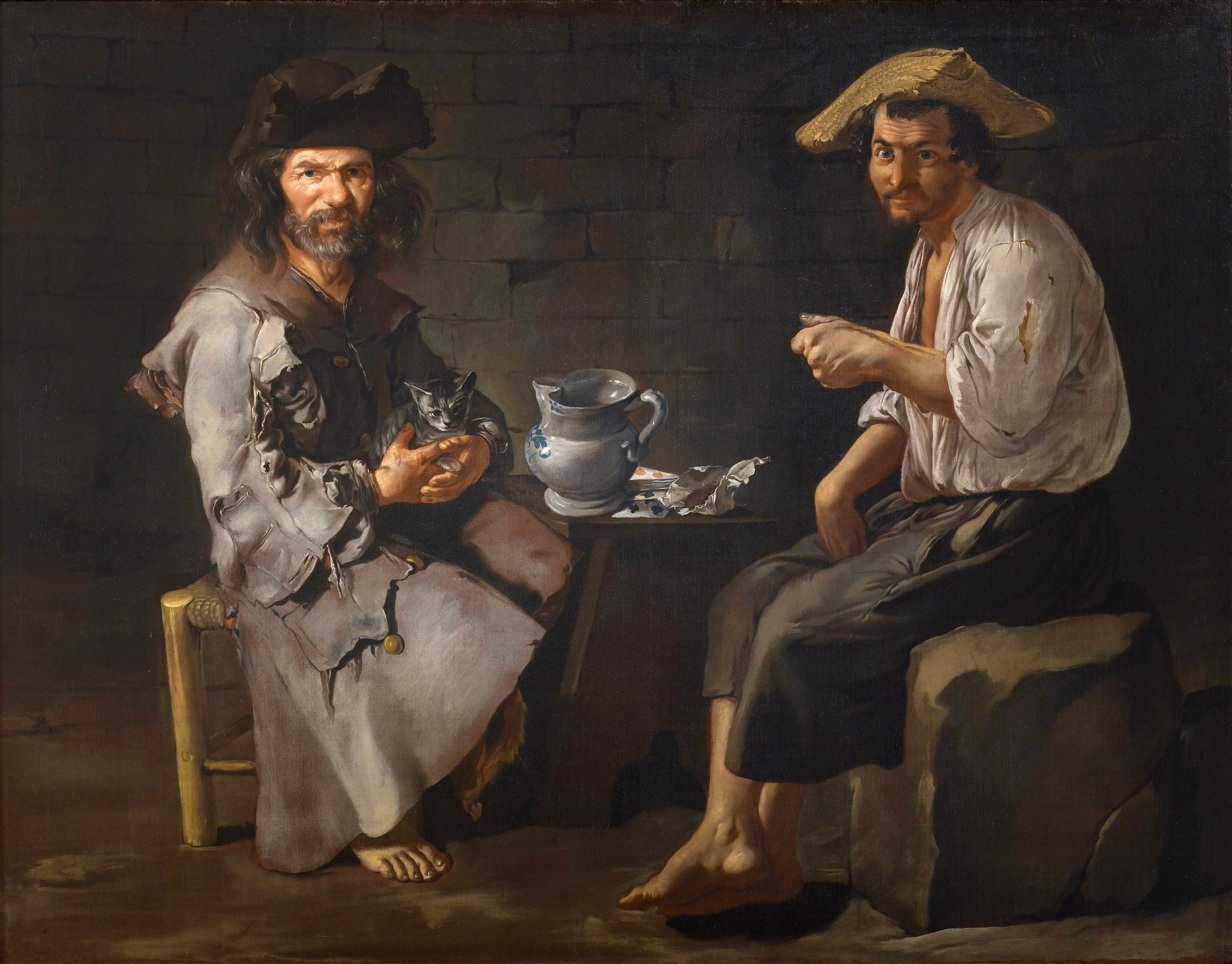
Two Beggars (c. 1737), Pinacoteca Tosio Martinengo, Brescia

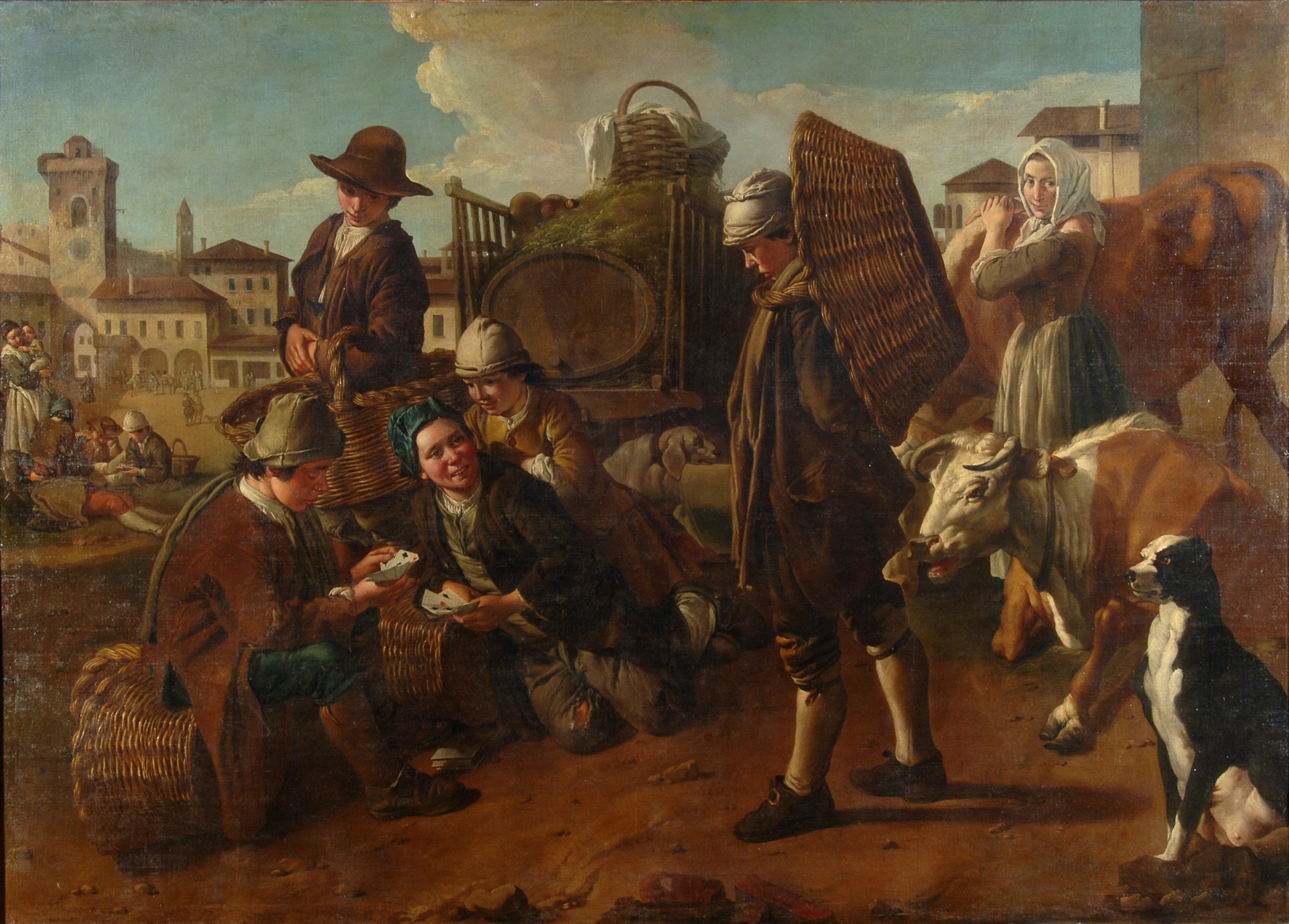
Evening at the Town Square or (Porters playing Cards (1730), Palazzo Madama, Turin

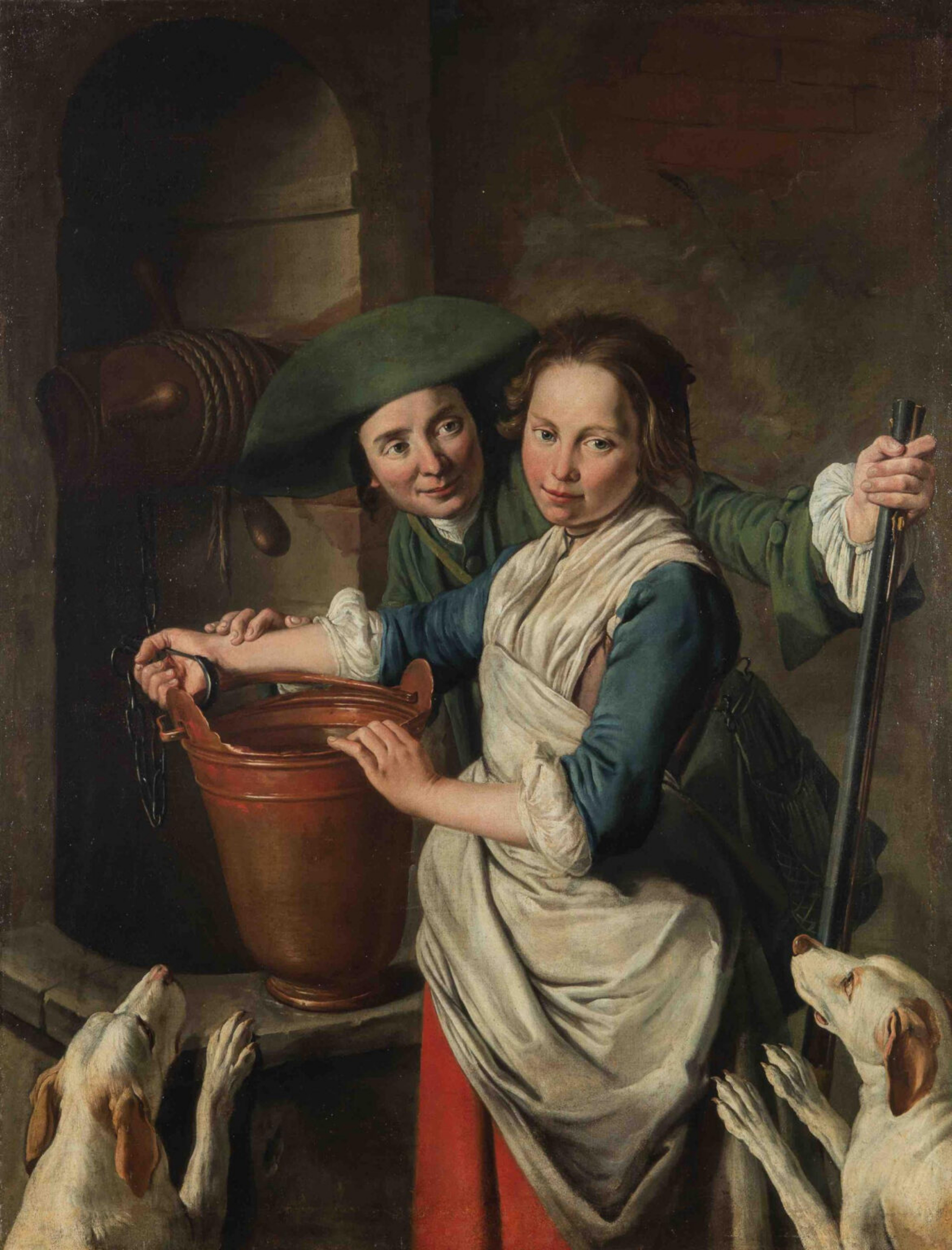
Meeting at the well

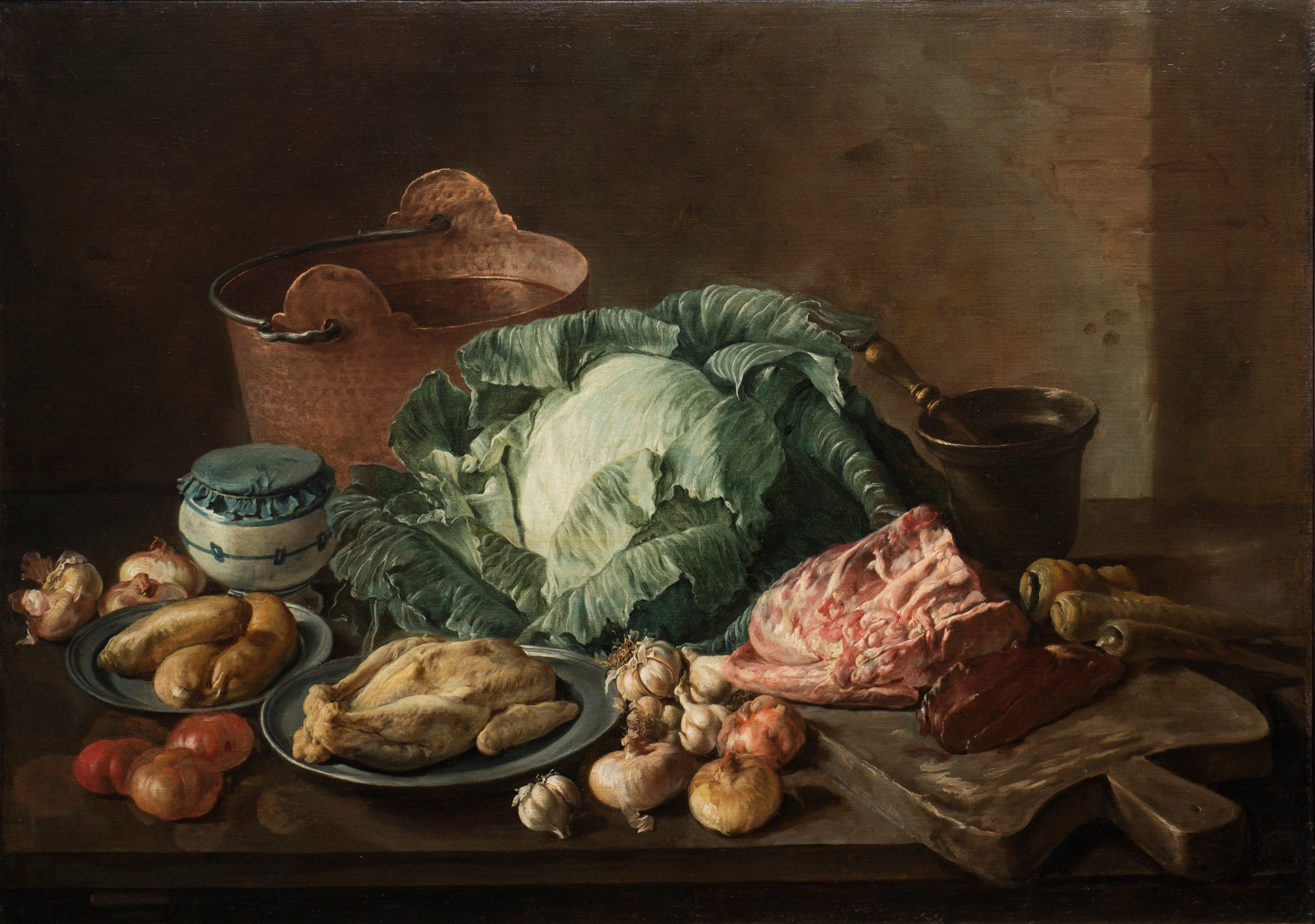
Kitchen still life with meat and vegetables on a table top, private collection

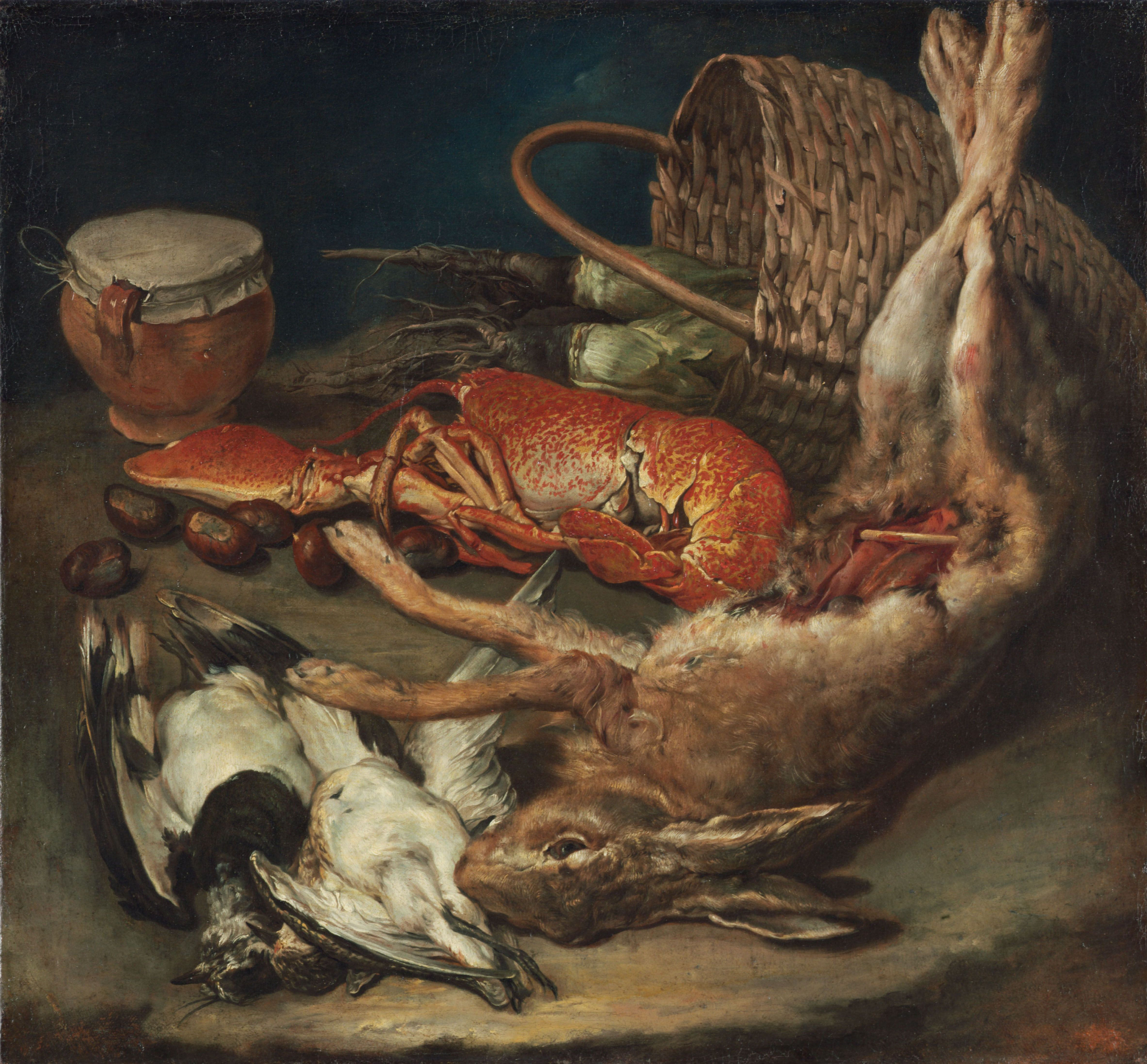
Still life with birds, a lobster and a hare, private collection

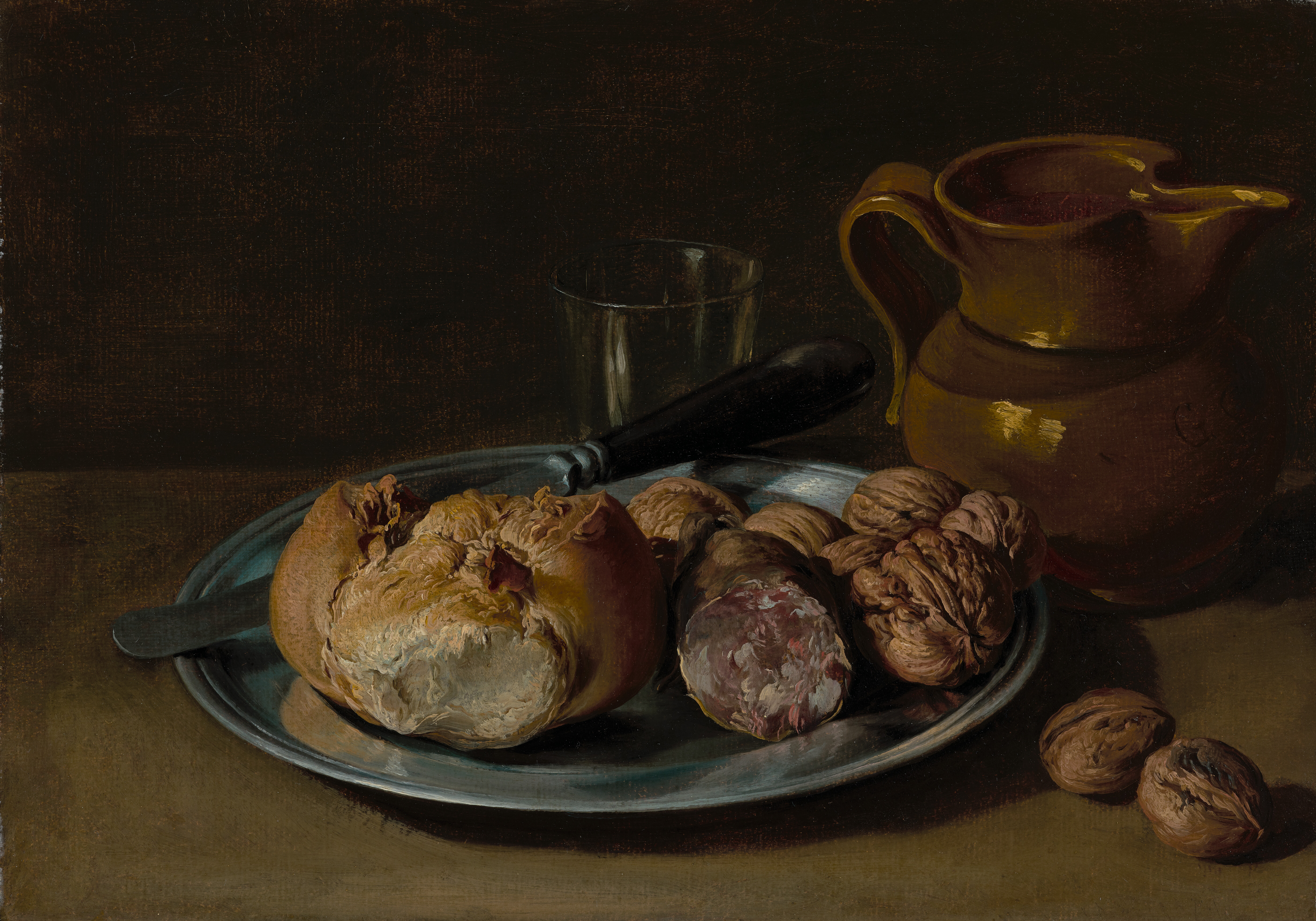
Still Life with Bread, Salami, and Nuts

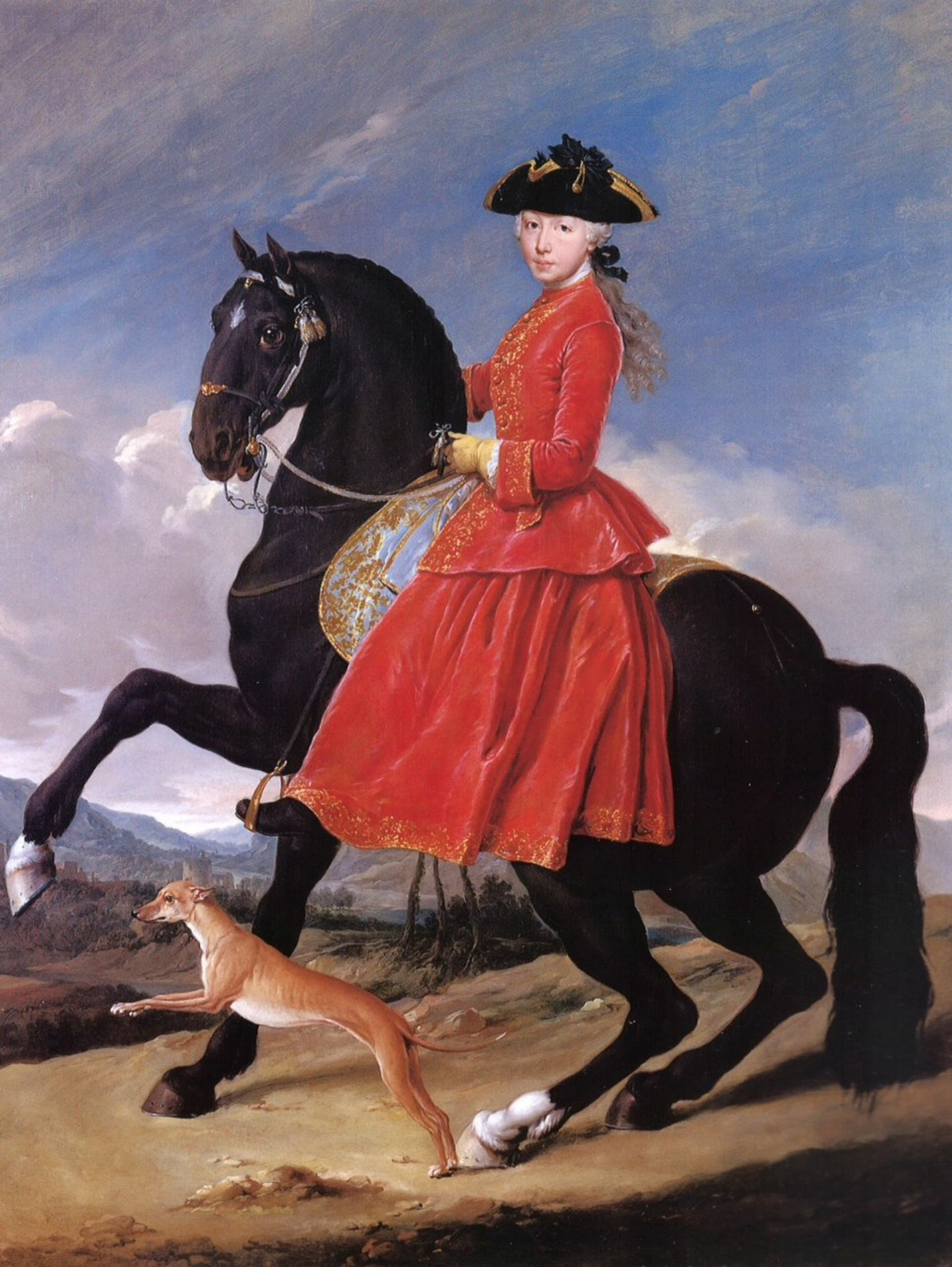
Portrait of a young woman on a horse

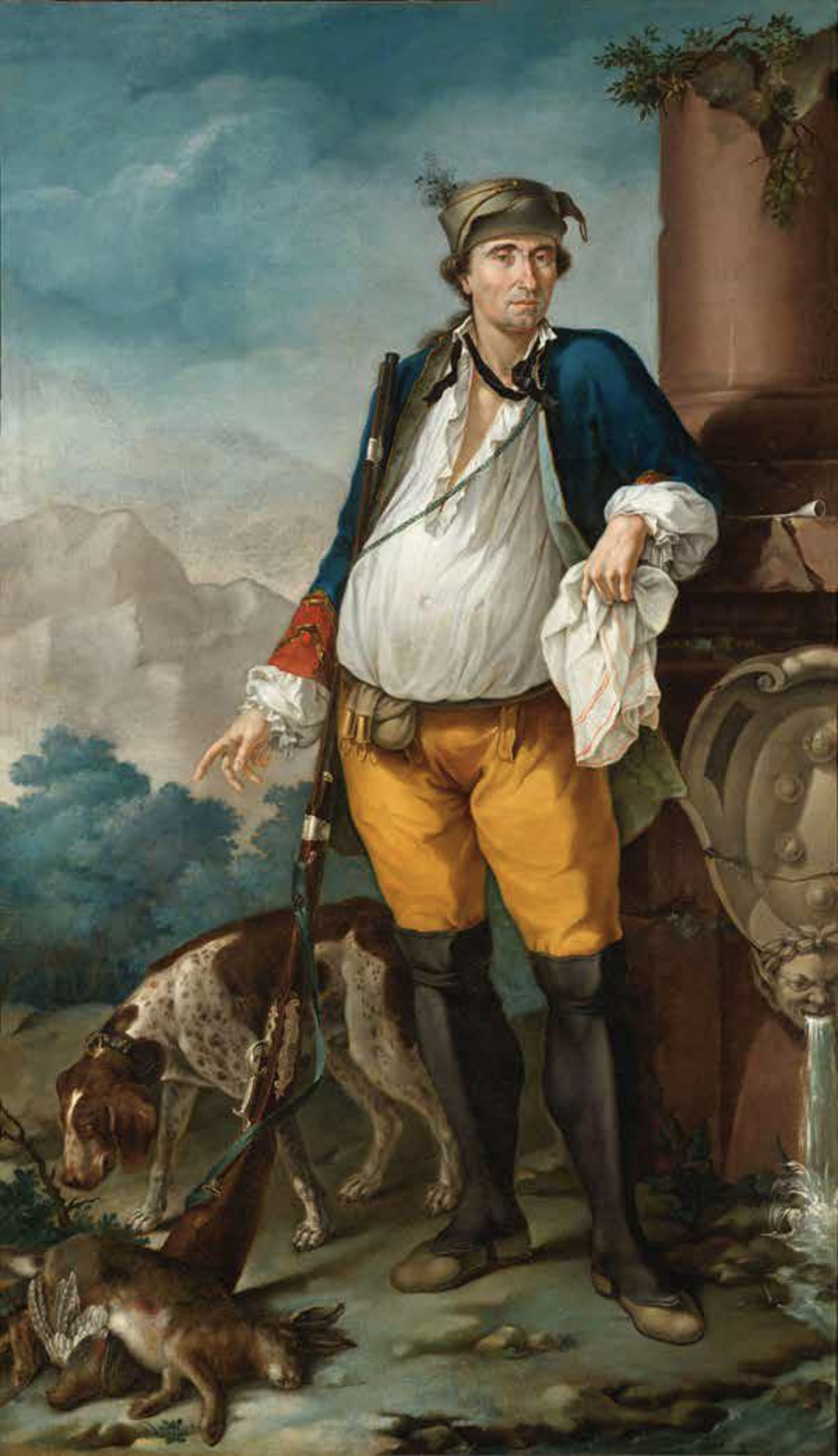
Portrait of Marcquis Carlo Cosimo Medici di Marignano

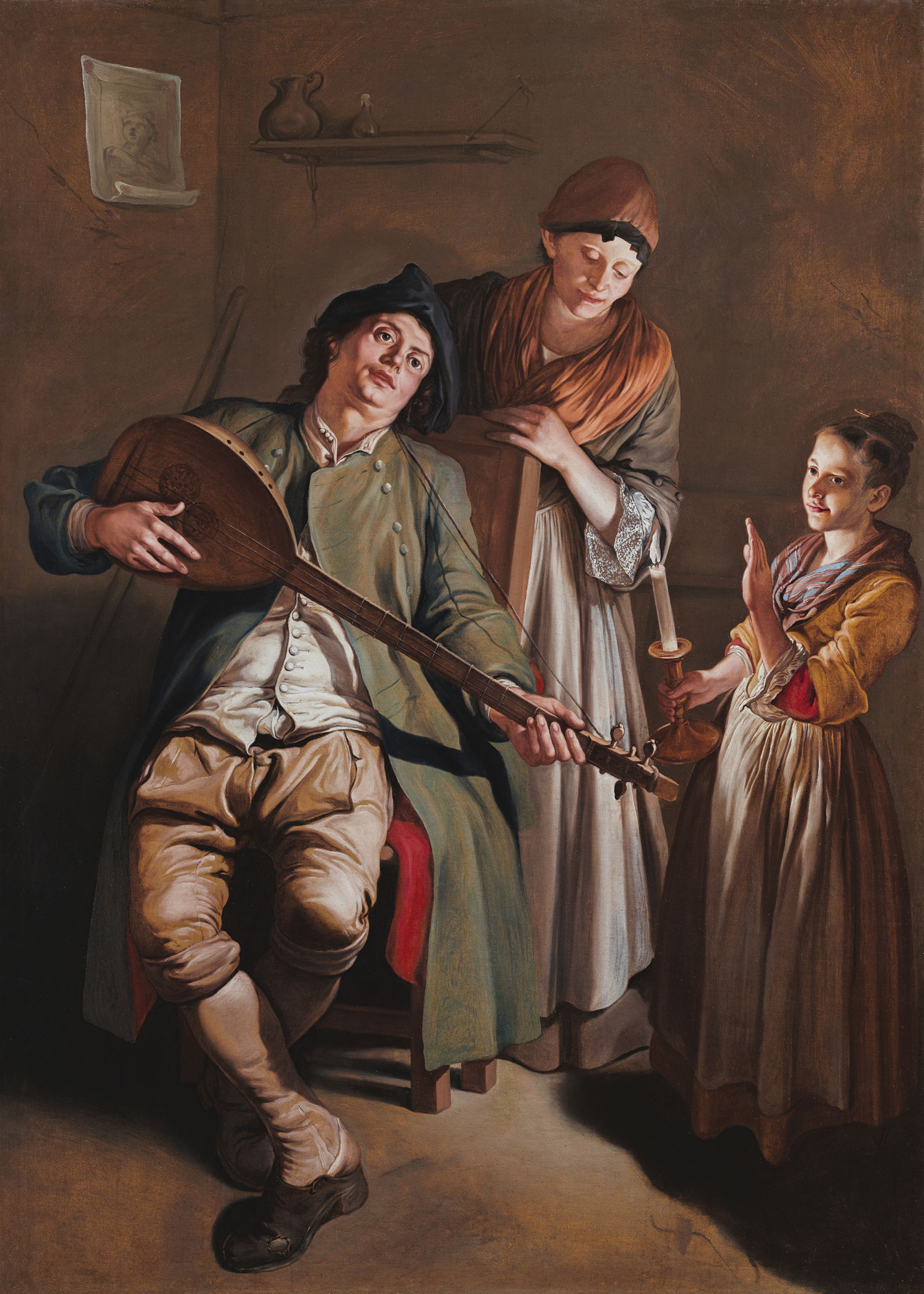
The Colascione player (c. 1740), private collection

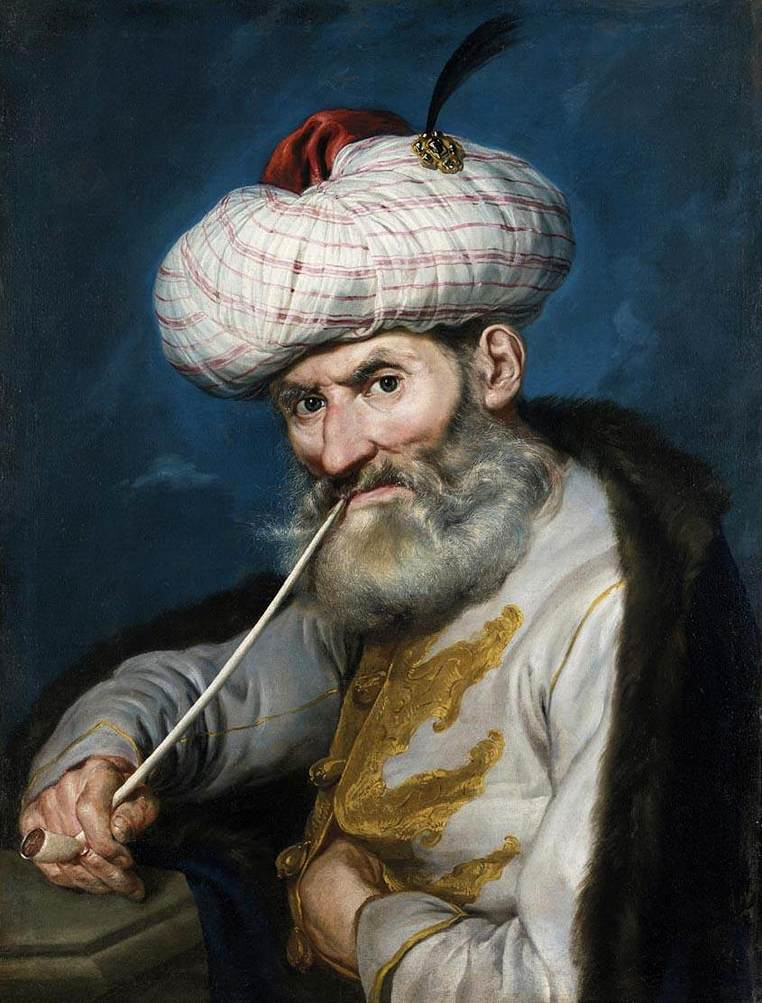
Smoking Man in Turban, private collection

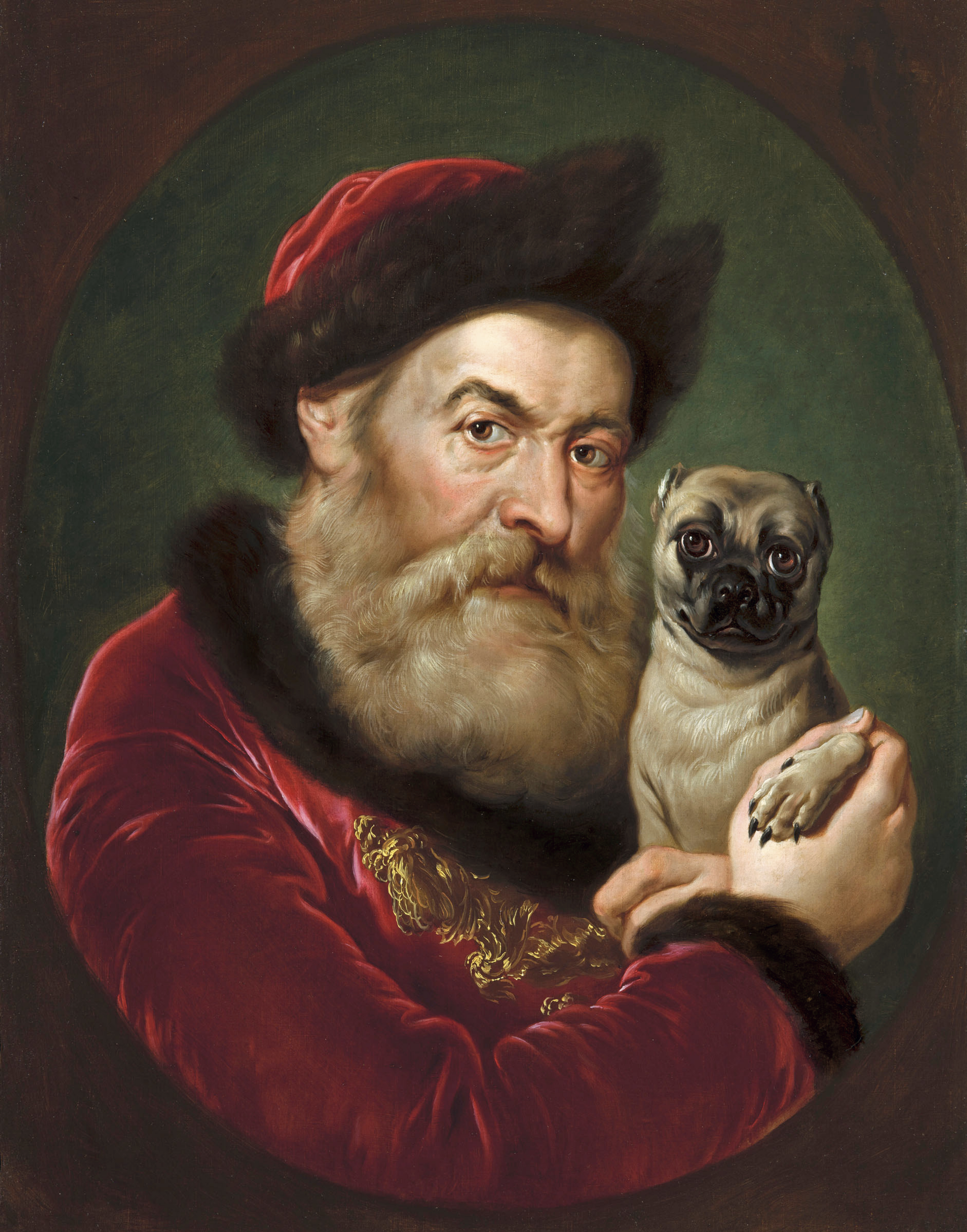
Portrait of an old man with a pug, private collection

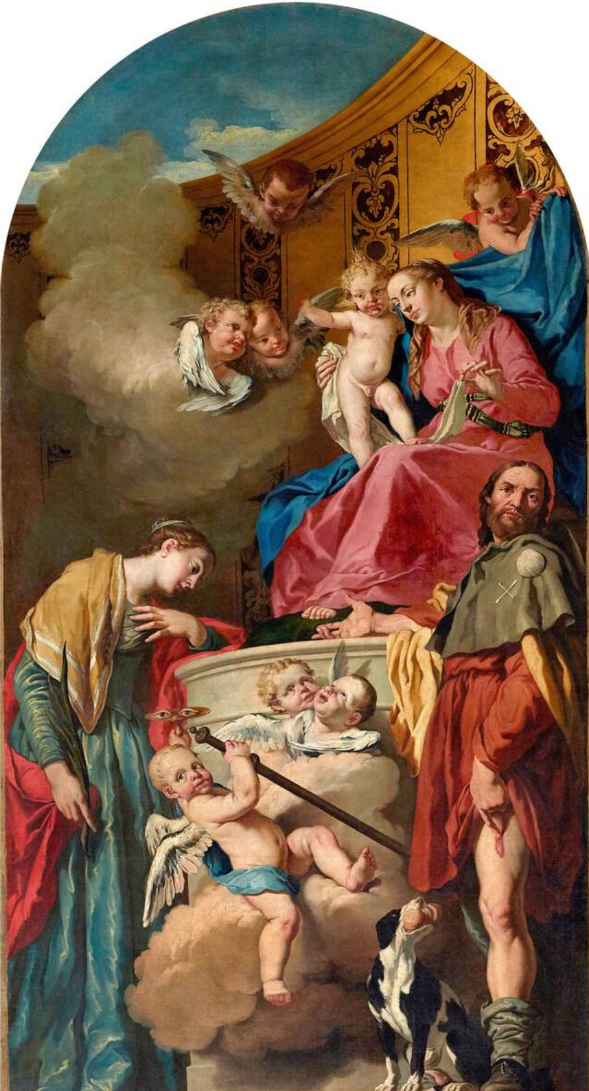
Virgin and Child with St. Lucy and St. Roch (c. 1740), Santa Lucia, Padua
