= The Transfigured Christ =

1513 painting by Andrea Previtali

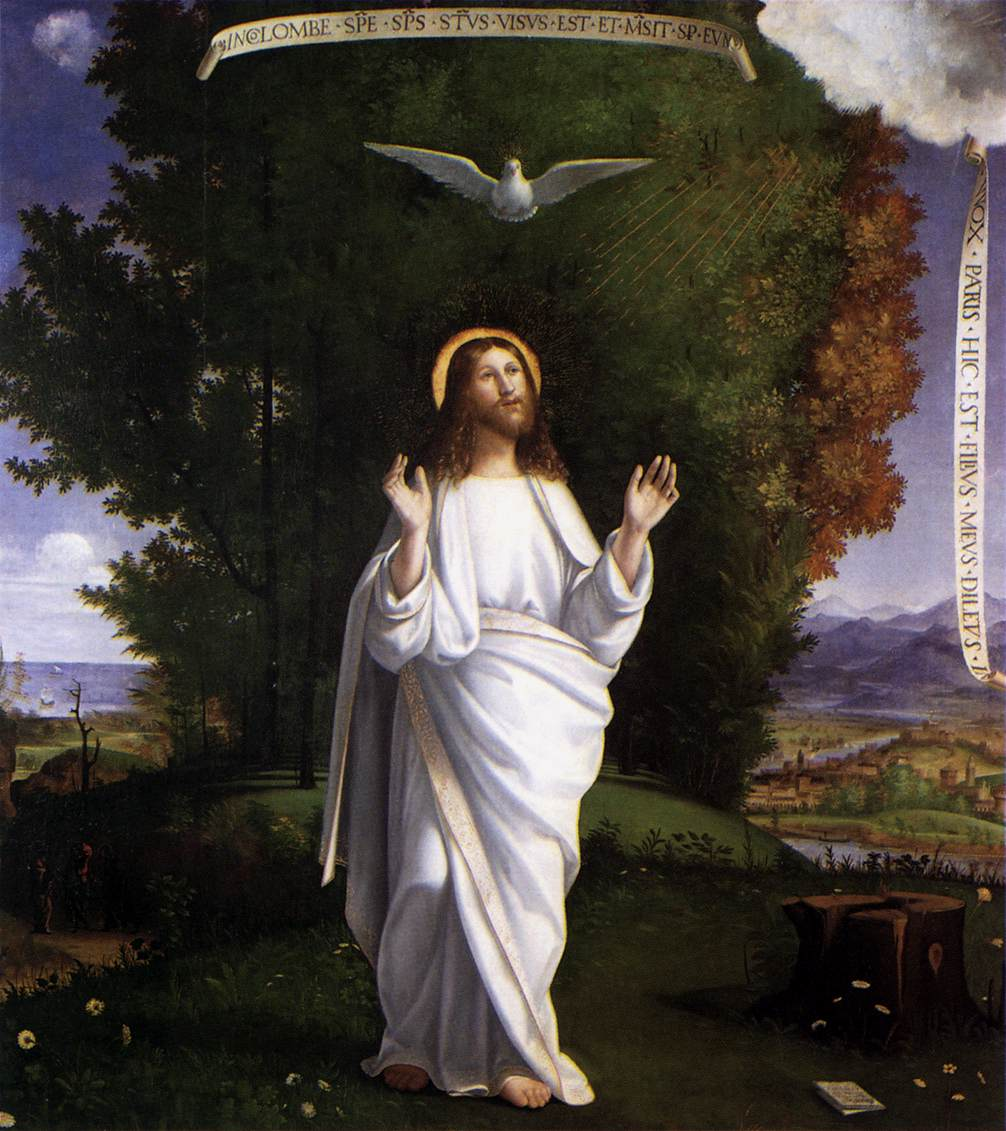
The Transfigured Christ (1513) by Andrea Previtali

The Transfigured Christ is a 1513 oil-on-panel painting by Andrea Previtali, in the Pinacoteca di Brera in Milan since 1811 It is signed and dated Al Nobel homo mr/Andrea dipintor in/Bergamo/MDXIII on a small book at bottom right.

It was one of the first works commissioned in Bergamo by Paolo and Giovannino Casotti, part of the Casotti de Mazzoleni, a merchant family made rich by the wool and silk trade. It was executed in 1513 as shown on the work itself – Francesco Tassi believed it was inscribed NOB.PAULUS, ET JO. FRATRES DE CASPOTTIS TRINO OBTULERUNT HAEC 1513. It is thought to have been for the family chapel in the church of Santa Maria Immacolata delle Grazie in Bergamo.Paolo and the rest of the family commissioned several other works from the artist, most notably the Casotti Madonna (1523).

== Iconography ==
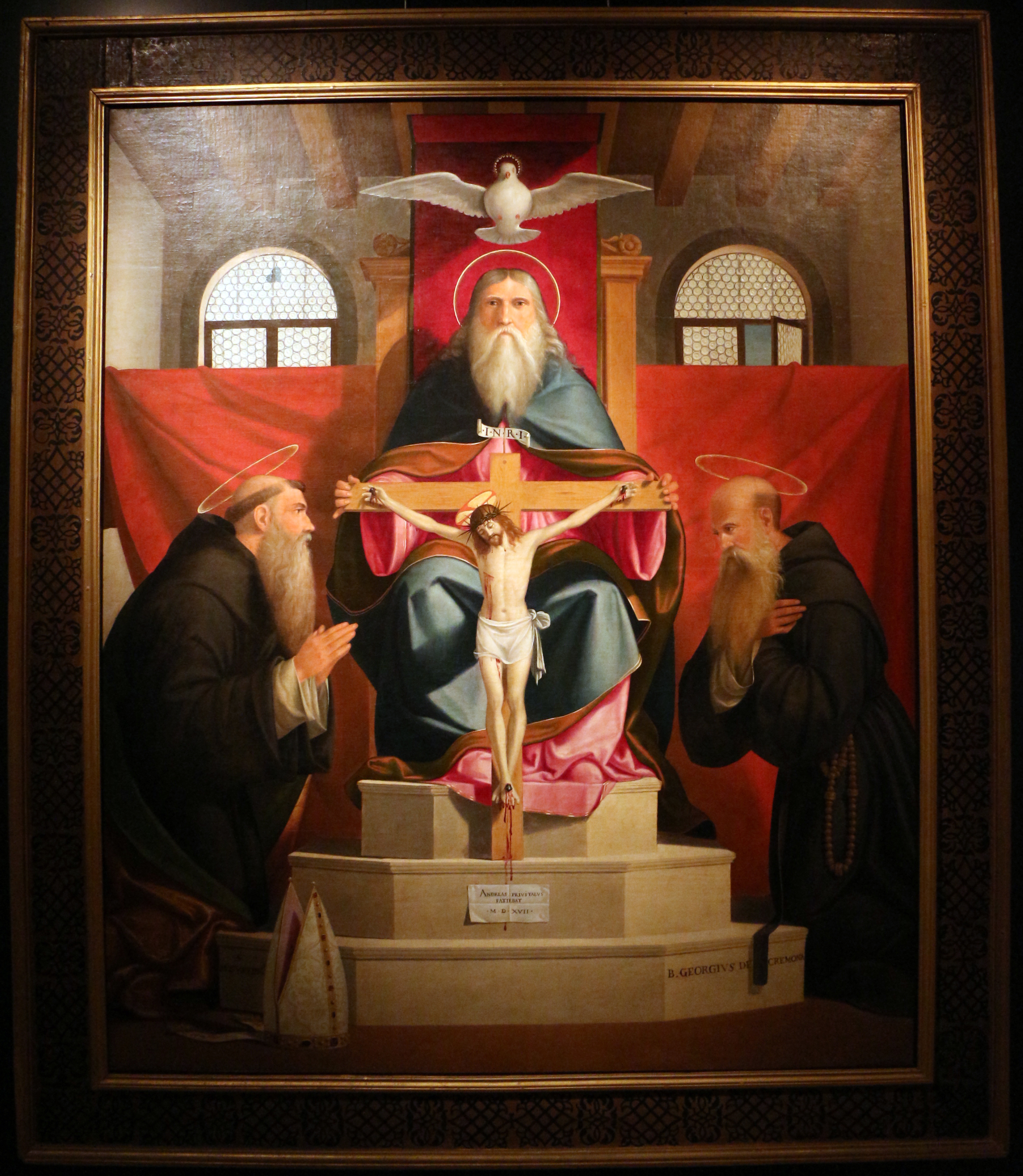
Andrea Previtali, Madonna with St Augustine and Blessed Giorgio da Cremona

The choice of subject was not casual, as it was produced in the year that Bergamo was besieged by French troops, supported by the Holy Roman Emperor, and only two years after Louis XII of France had called an assembly of prelates, threatening schism. The work therefore represented a return to the unifying values of faith. The painter was accompanied by a Franciscan theologian during the work's production.

The work nominally portrays the Transfiguration of Christ, though it omits the three apostles traditional to paintings of that event and relegates the figures of Moses and Elijah to the distance. All three persons of the Holy Trinity are represented, with the Holy Spirit as a white dove and the Father as white light, a cloud and words on scrolls above and beside the Son, a representation of the Trinity very different to that Previtali later produced for the church of Almenno San Salvatore. The scrolls are very narrow, probably due to the space where the work was to be hung – the church stipulated that it could not cover the existing frescoes of The Life of St Francis by Jacopino Scipioni.

The tree behind Christ casts a shadow, intimating his Passion and Resurrection. In the left and right background is a naturalistic landscape and the River Jordan, referring to Christ's baptism, another event marked by the presence of the Father, Son, and Holy Spirit.

== Bibliography ==
- Mauro Zanchi (2009). Andrea Previtali il colore prospettico di maniera belliniana (in Italian). Ferrari Editrice.
