= Ghislandi =

Ghislandi is an Italian surname, often found in the city of Bergamo. Notable people with the surname include:

- Davide Ghislandi (born 2001), Italian professional footballer
- Domenico Ghislandi (c. 1620–1717), Italian painter, father of Giuseppe
- Giuseppe Vittore Ghislandi, known as Fra Galgario (1655–1743), Italian painter
- Pietro Ghislandi (1957–2025), Italian actor
- Sara Ghislandi (born 1998), Italian ice dancer
