= Paolo Bonomino =

Italian painter

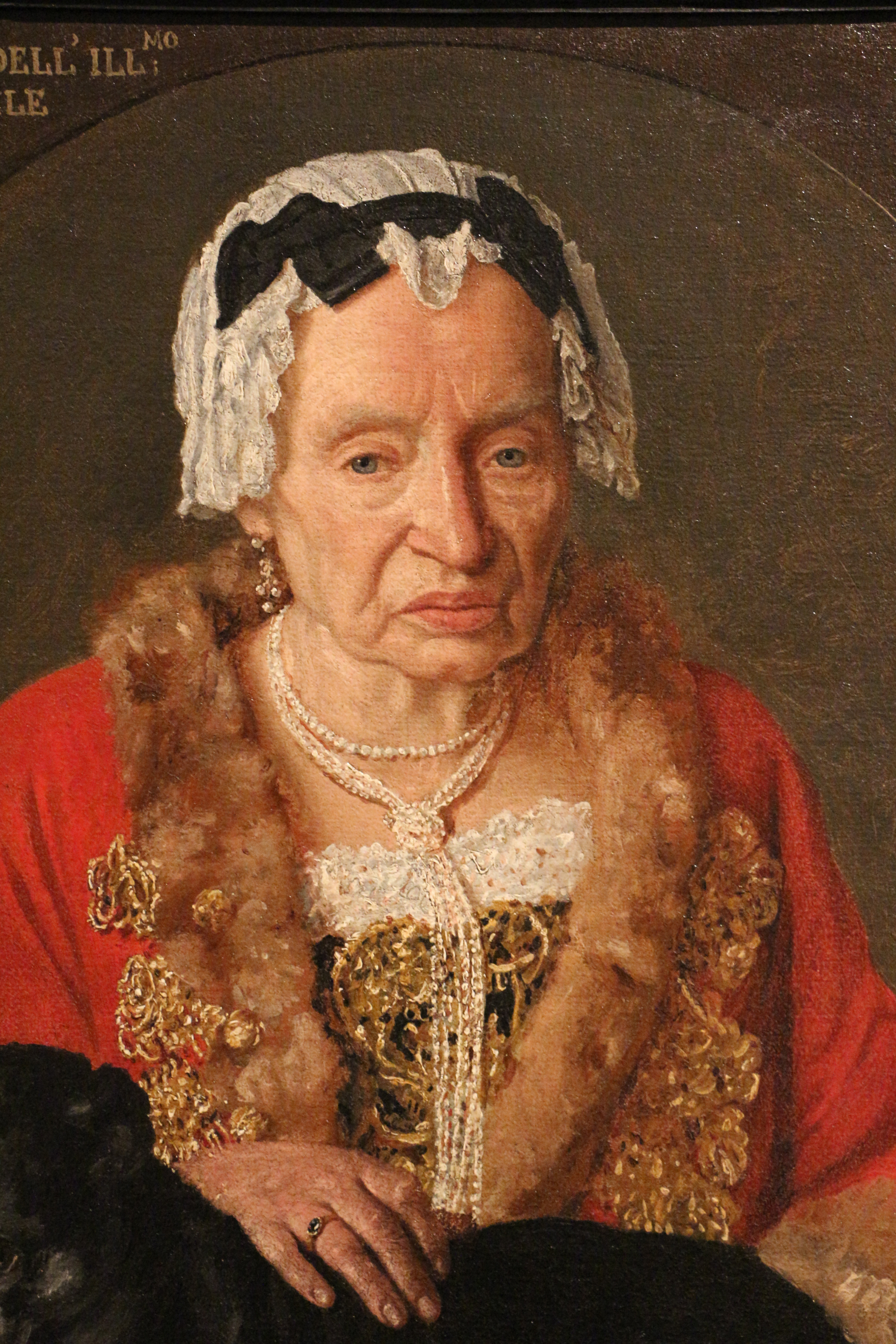
Portrait of Zenobia Benaglio Marenzi, 1737, Accademia Carrara, Bergamo

Paolo Maria Bonomino (1703 – post 1779) was an Italian painter, mainly active in Bergamo as a portraitist during the Rococo or late-Baroque period.

== Biography ==
He was born in Bergamo, and trained under Fra Galgario. His paintings were afterwards often confused with those of his master.

== Bibliography ==
- Brinton, Selwyn (1912). "Fra Vittore Ghislandi". The Burlington Magazine. 21 (114): 350–353, 357. JSTOR 859140.
