= Portrait of a Lady (Ceruti) =

Painting by Giacomo Ceruti

- Ladies portrait (Contessa Colleoni)
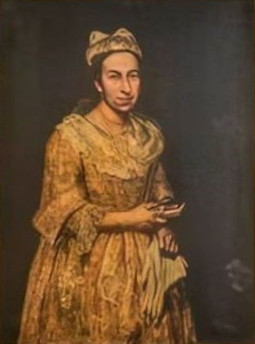
- Dimensions: 119.5 cm (47.0 in) × 89 cm (35 in)
- Location: Argentina
- Owner: Jacques Goudstikker, Friedrich Kadgien, Patricia Kadgien
- Accession: 2709a

Portrait of a Lady, also known as Portrait of a Woman, is a portrait by Giacomo Ceruti, although it was more recently misattributed to Fra Galgario, both being Italian painters of the late 17th century – early 18th century. Missing since 1945, it was discovered in August 2025 via a real estate listing for a private house in Mar del Plata, Argentina. It was surrendered to authorities on 3 September 2025.

== History ==
=== Attribution ===
The portrait dates to the early 18th century. In 1927, art historian Roberto Longhi attributed the work to Italian painter Giacomo Ceruti (1698–1767). In 1984, art scholar Mina Gregori supported this attribution.

Upon its rediscovery in 2025, the painting was widely reported to have been created by the Italian painter Fra Galgario (born Giuseppe Vittore Ghislandi, 1655–1743). Subsequently, art curator Paolo Plebani of Bergamo's Accademia Carrara—which hosts the world's largest collection of Galgario paintings—argued that the work's prior attribution to Ceruti was correct. The attribution to Galgario is regarded as erroneous.

=== Disappearance ===
The painting belonged to Jewish Dutch art dealer Jacques Goudstikker, who died in 1940 while trying to escape the German invasion of the Netherlands by ship. He had listed the portrait amongst his collection of over 1,000 works, about 800 of which were then forcibly sold to Nazi official Hermann Göring. According to a Goudstikker family lawyer, in 1944 Dutch art dealer and Göring associate Alois Miedl sold the portrait to Göring's aide Friedrich Kadgien, an SS officer.

At the end of World War II, Kadgien fled to Switzerland and then South America (first Brazil and then Argentina). He died in 1978 and was survived by his two daughters.

=== Recovery ===
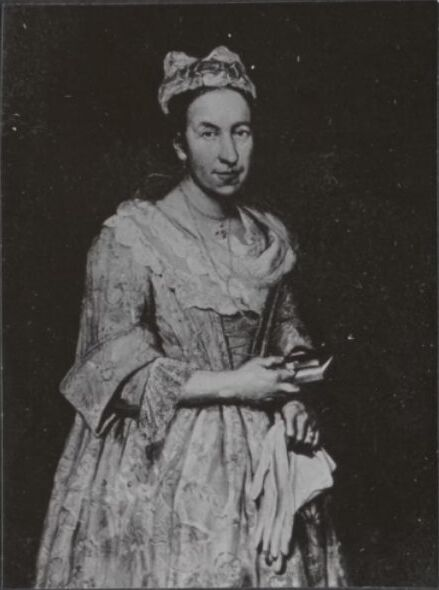
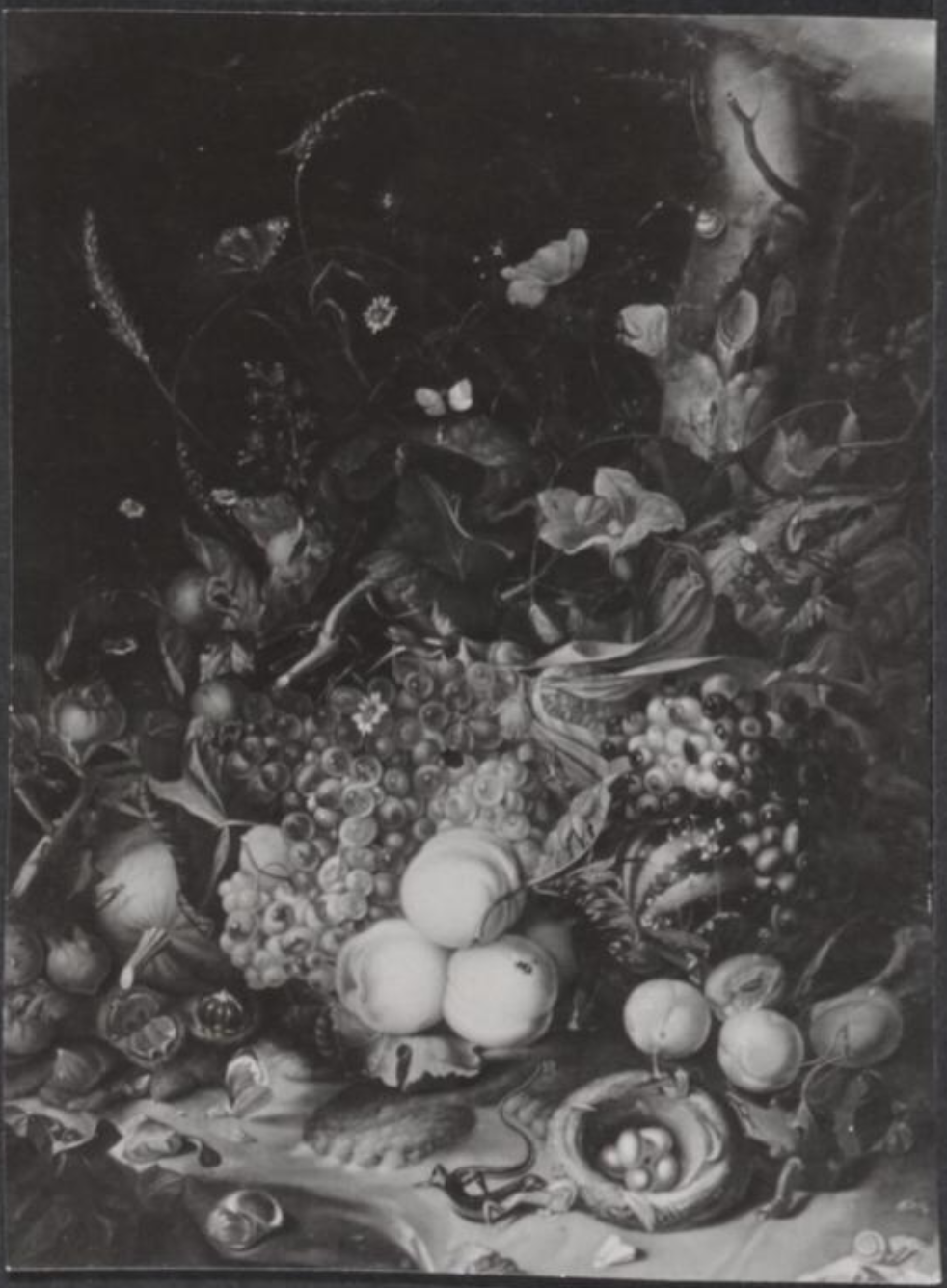
The portrait and the still life, via the RCE

As of 2020, the Cultural Heritage Agency of the Netherlands (RCE) listed Kadgien as possibly having possessed the portrait, as well as a still life by Abraham Mignon. Around that time, Dutch newspaper Algemeen Dagblad (AD) found wartime documents suggesting that Kadgien possessed both works. The AD unsuccessfully tried to discuss the missing art and Kadgien with his daughters, who were living in Buenos Aires, Argentina. A reporter attempted to visit one of their houses, located in Mar del Plata. Learning that it was for sale, he sent the AD a link to the real estate listing. An AD reporter noticed that a photograph apparently showed the portrait, which was supported by art historians. Additionally, two researchers at the RCE thought the still-life painting was visible in a social-media post by one of Kadgien's daughters. The AD reported the discovery on 25 August 2025.

On 27 August 2025, it was reported that officials had searched the property to find the painting removed and replaced with a tapestry. Additionally, during the searches of four total properties, two other paintings and a series of engravings and drawings were found at the home of Patricia Kadgien's sister; these were to be analyzed to determine if they had been stolen. By 2 September, Patricia Kadgien and her husband were placed under house arrest for 72 hours, with a hearing set for 4 September.

On 3 September 2025, Patricia Kadgien's lawyer surrendered the painting to officials, while the family asked the court if they could put it up for auction, which was denied. Kadgien and her husband were questioned about their alleged obstruction of the investigation and were expected to be charged with concealing theft in the context of genocide. Criminal prosecutors stated that they would investigate the painting's provenance to determine its rightful ownership. Kadgien filed a civil claim asserting that her father's sister-in-law bought the painting in 1943 from Cologne's Wallraf–Richartz Museum (which stated that it never possessed the piece) and that she had only removed the artwork from her house for security because she thought the journalist trying to contact her about it was a scammer.

By 4 September 2025, Goudstikker's heir filed a legal claim to the work with the United States Federal Bureau of Investigation. By 5 September, Kadgien and her husband had been charged with concealing the artwork, as well as many other pieces, such as 22 reportedly by French painter Henri Matisse (1869–1954).

In September 2026, a court ruled that the painting must be returned to the heir of its rightful owner.

=== Impact ===
The artwork's recovery coincided with the 80th anniversary of the end of World War II, joining other disclosures about the fascist ratline to Argentina and admissions of some continued secrecy about such matters.
