= Salomon Adler =

German painter (1630–1709)

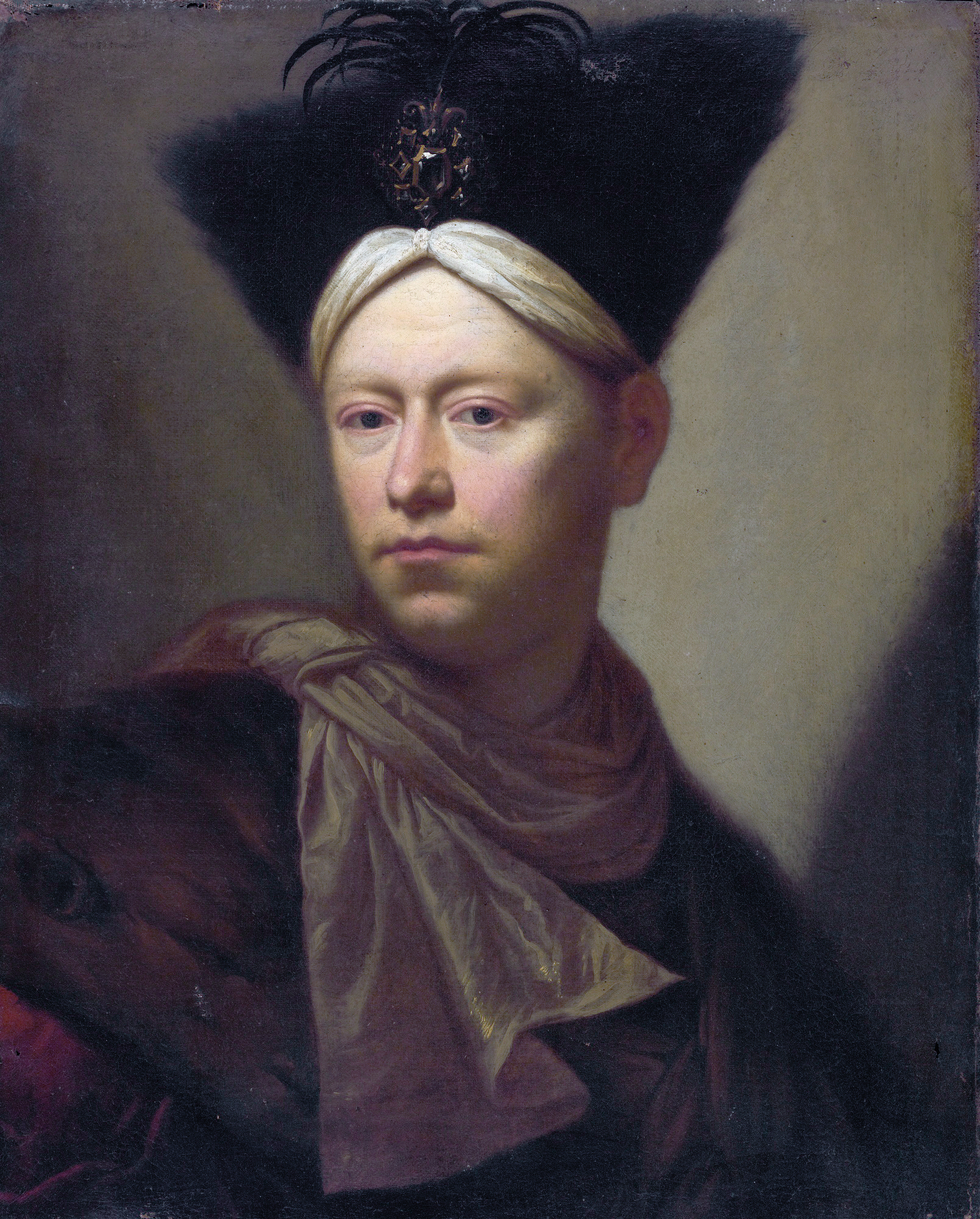
- Self-portrait, priv. col.
- Born: c. 1630; Gdańsk, Polish–Lithuanian Commonwealth
- Died: 1709; Milan, Duchy of Milan
- Known for: Painting
- Movement: Baroque

Salomon Adler (before 3 March 1630 – 1709 in Milan) was a German painter of the Baroque period, active in Milan and Bergamo as a portrait painter. He was the mentor of Fra' Galgario. Born in Danzig (Gdańsk), died in Milan.

== Biography ==
Adler came from a family of cloth makers in Gdansk. He was of Lutheran faith. His manner of painting (reminiscent of Rembrandt and his predilection for oriental clothing in his portraits) suggests an early education in Gdansk. Perhaps he was again the same age as Andreas Ruthardt the painter Daniel Schultz in Gdansk in the doctrine and probably went with him before 1653 to Italy (1653 is his baptismal record in Gdansk in Italy handed down). His artworks show the influence of portrait painters from Venice (Nicolas Régnier and Tiberio Tinelli). In the years from 1679 to 1691, he was demonstrably in Milan. He was much appreciated as a portrait painter.

He was the teacher of Fra' Galgario (Vittore Ghislandi), who went to Milan to study his works being portrayed several times.

Rembrandt may also have influenced him through his pupil Wilhelm Drost, who was temporarily in Venice. In addition, the school of tenebrosi with its light-dark contrasts on him.

Self-portraits of Adler can be found in Bergamo, Milan (Brera gallery and collection Franco Marinotti), Budapest (possibly a replica of the Self-portrait in the Uffizi), and in the Uffizi and the Museo Bardini in Florence. In addition to Rembrandt, the French court painter Hyacinthe Rigaud is also mentioned as an influence. The only work signed by Adler is the portrait of a young man in the Germanisches Nationalmuseum of Nuremberg, which was acquired in 1963 from the Italian art trade. Known are over a dozen paintings, almost all portraits (except a Judith and an allegory).

In 1955 there was an exhibition of him in the Palazzo della Ragione (Bergamo). A self-portrait was found in the Brera in Milan.

== See also ==
- List of German painters

== Bibliography ==
- D'Ancona, Paolo (1929). "ADLER, Salomon". Enciclopedia Italiana. Rome: Istituto dell'Enciclopedia Italiana.
- Gelly, Clara (2006). Nancy, Musée des beaux-arts: peintures italiennes et espagnoles, XIVe–XIXe siècle. Roche-la-Molière: IAC Éditions. p. 155. ISBN 2-916373-01-2.
