= Friedrich Kadgien =

Financial Advisor and financier to Nazi Germany

- Born: Friedrich Gustav Kadgien; 23 June 1907; Elberfeld, Kingdom of Prussia
- Died: 1978 (aged 70–71); Mar del Plata, Buenos Aires, Argentina
- Other name: Federico Gustavo Kadgien
- Citizenship: German
- Education: University of Cologne (JD)
- Occupations: Businessman, financier, lawyer
- Children: 2

Friedrich Gustav Kadgien (23 June 1907 – 1978) was a German businessman, financier, lawyer and high ranking Nazi official who oversaw the Nazi looting of diamonds and gold from occupied countries, and served as special representative of the Four Year Plan during Nazi Germany.

== Early life and education ==
Kadgien was born 23 June 1907 in Elberfeld, Kingdom of Prussia, to Arthur Kadgien (1867–1920) and Maria Kadgien (née Wulfert; 1871–1956), both originally from Bad Kreuznach. His father was a district judge and later a higher regional court councillor.

He completed a Dr. iur. degree at the University of Cologne with a dissertation on an arcane topic in the Law of Obligations.

== Career ==
He entered the Prussian government administration, initially being employed as a lecturer in foreign exchange of the Department of Economic Affairs. Kadgien was a financial advisor to Adolf Hitler and Hermann Goering.

He transferred Nazi plunder, estimated at several millions, to South America. The allies referred to him as "The Snake" and tried but failed to locate him for several years.

== Personal life ==
While in Argentina, Kadgien married and had two daughters, Patricia and Alicia.

== Death ==
Kadgien died in 1978 at his residence in the city of Mar del Plata aged 70–71.

== Nazi looted art ==
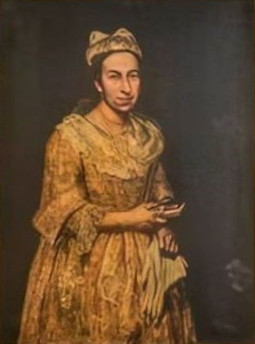
The painting Portrait of a Lady by Giuseppe Ghislandi

In 2025 a real estate agent published an image online of the interior of a house in Mar del Plata, Argentina depicting the painting "Portrait of a Lady (Contessa Colleoni)" by Giacomo Ceruti. That portrait once belonged to the Jewish-Dutch art dealer Jacques Goudstikker until WW II and was considered Nazi looted art. The house subsequently searched by the police belonged to one of Kadgien's daughters. The painting was not found. Searches of family properties during the investigation resulted in the seizure of two other paintings and a series of engravings and drawings that may have also been stolen pieces, at the home of Ms Kadgien's sister Alicia. On 3 September 2025, prosecutors announced the painting had been returned by the lawyer of Patricia Kadgien. The painting was held by the Supreme Court, and on 4 September 2026 judge Santiago Inchausti issued a ruling returning the painting to the heir of Mr. Goudstikker, his daughter-in-law Marei von Saher. The court also sentenced Patricia Kadgien and her husband Juan Carlos Cortegoso to two-years' probation and to donate a sum of money to a public institution in Mar del Plata.
