= Francesco Maria Tassi =

Italian art historian (1716-1782)

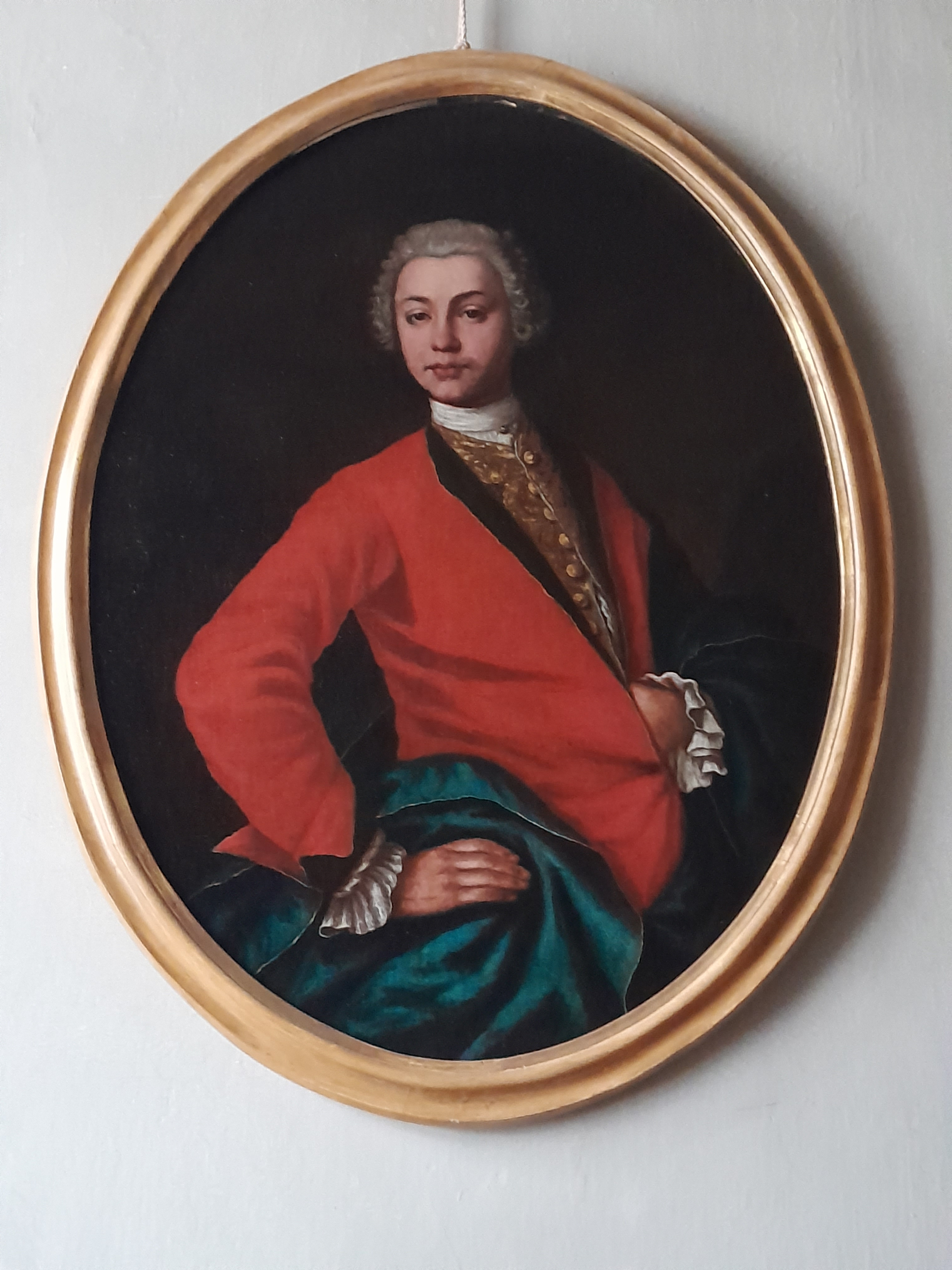
Francesco Maria Tassi

Francesco Maria Tassi (1716 in Bergamo – 1782) was an Italian art historian whose book, Lives of the Painters, Sculptors, and Architects of Bergamo, published posthumously in 1793, provided important biographical information on artists such as Lorenzo Lotto, Fra Galgario, Giovanni Battista Tiepolo, and Francesco Zuccarelli. His account of contemporaries was often enlivened by first-hand knowledge, for example with Tiepolo and Zuccarelli, who at times visited Tassi at the family estate of Villa dei Tasso alla Celadina, in Bergamo. Tassi also edited a compilation of writings by Benvenuto Cellini which appeared in print in 1829.
