= Cesare Femi =

Italian painter

Cesare Femi (active mid-18th century) was an Italian painter, active in Northern Italy.

== Biography ==
He appears to have been born in Norcia, to a father who worked as a lithotomist at a local hospital, and trained his son in the same career and as an oculist. Cesare continued this profession for most of his life, and was highly regarded. However, Cesare then trained as a painter under Fra Galgario in Bergamo. He is known for painting landscapes, including copies of paintings by Francesco Zuccarelli. He also painted portraits of Giulio Oderi (1754) of the Order of the Crociferi in Genoa, and Gaetano Miglorini of the Capuchin order. He also painted family portraits. He was alive circa 1793, and still active in painting.
