= Casotti Madonna =

Painting by Andrea Previtali

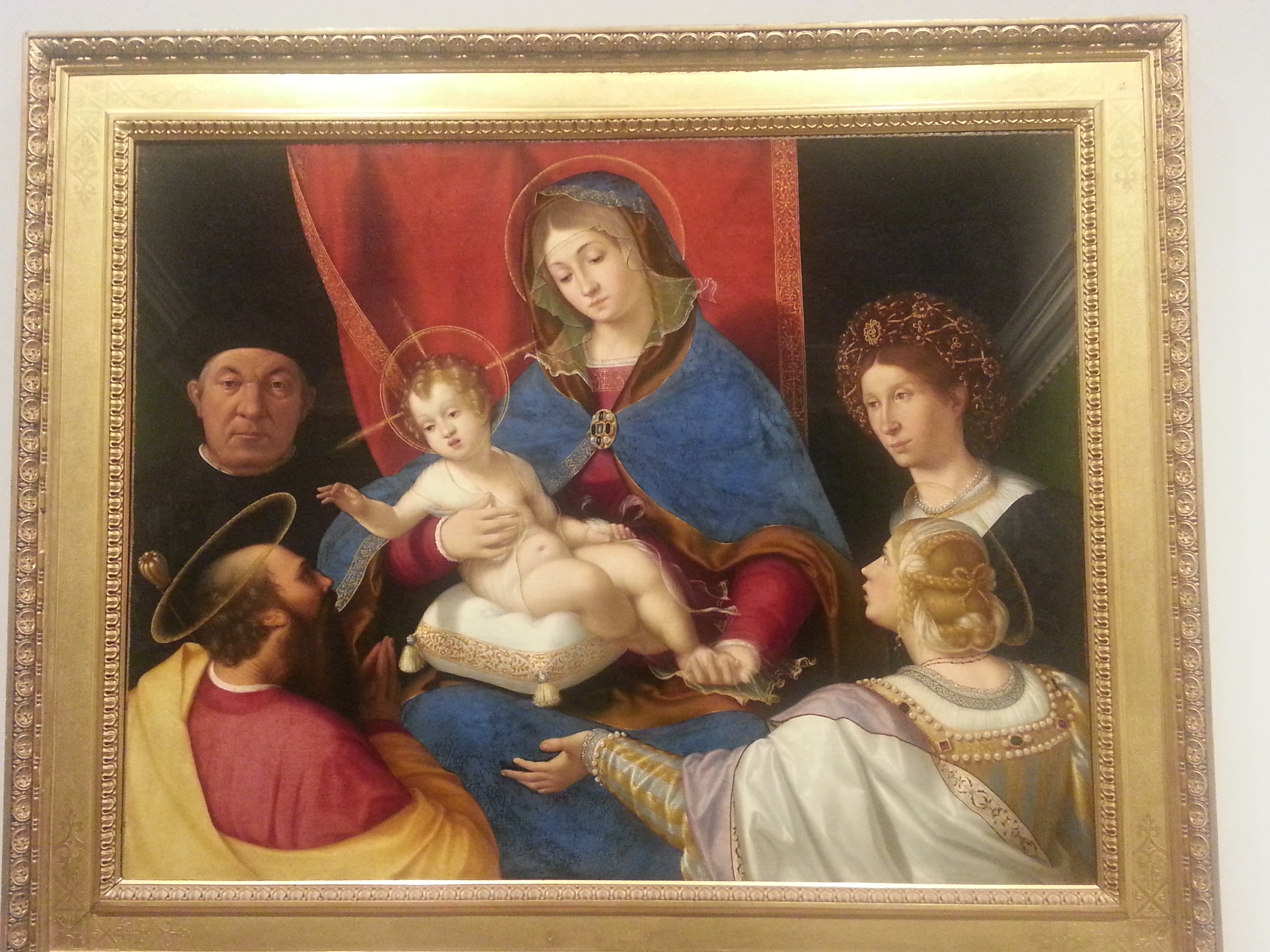
Casotti Madonna (1523) by Andrea Previtali

The Casotti Madonna or Madonna and Child with Saint Paul, Saint Agnes and Donors is an oil on panel painting by Andrea Previtali now in the Accademia Carrara in Bergamo. It was commissioned in 1523 by Paolo Casotti, a rich merchant from Bergamo, the artist's native city.

== Bibliography ==
- Mauro Zanchi (2009). Andrea Previtali il colore prospettico di maniera belliniana (in Italian). Ferrari Editrice.
- (in Italian) Gianmario Petrò, 'La casa di Paolo de Mazzoleni al n. 70 di via Pignolo ora Palazzo Albani Bonomi', inLa Rivista di Bergamo via the Gazzetta di Bergamo, 1992.
