= Villa dei Tasso alla Celadina =

16th-century palace in Lombardy, Italy

The Villa dei Tasso alla Celadina, also referred to as the "Cerradina" or Serandina, is a 16th-century rural palace located in the Celadina quarter of the city of Bergamo in the region of Lombardy, Italy. It was commissioned by Gabriele Tasso of the prominent Tasso family, which since the 14th century under Omodeo Tasso had become rich as mail couriers for the papacy, and was once the nucleus of a productive farm.

The site likely housed either a home with a fortress tower, when Gabriele Tasso, son of Domenico Tasso, expanded the buildings and gardens in the first half of the 16th century. Presently the villa, courtyards, and gardens are used for social events. The movable interior artwork was transferred to the collections of the Accademia Carrara. A number of rooms retain their stucco and fresco decoration. Adjacent to the villa is a small church, known as the Oratorio dei Tasso.
