= Fra Galgario =

Italian painter (1655–1743)

Fra’ Galgario
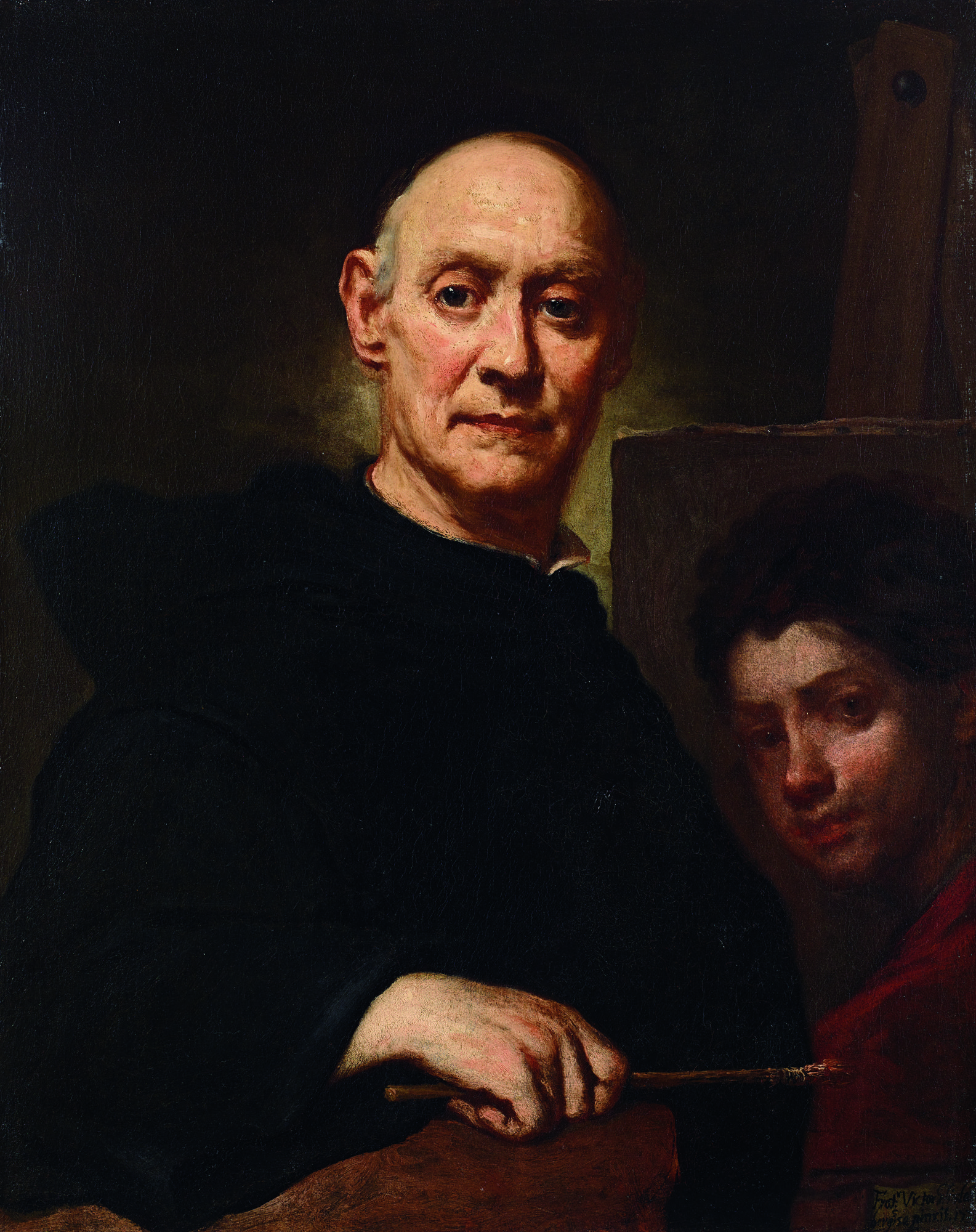
- Self-portrait, 1732, Accademia Carrara, Bergamo
- Born: Giuseppe Vittore Ghislandi; 4 March 1655; Bergamo, Republic of Venice
- Died: December 1743 (aged 88); Bergamo, Republic of Venice
- Education: Sebastiano Bombelli
- Known for: Painting
- Notable work: Portrait of a Lady
- Movement: Baroque, Rococo, Venetian School

Fra’ Galgario (4 March 1655 – December 1743), born Giuseppe Vittore Ghislandi, and also called Fra’ Vittore del Galgario, was an Italian painter, mainly active in Bergamo as a portraitist during the Rococo or late-Baroque period.

== Biography ==
Giuseppe Vittore was born in Bergamo on 4 March 1655. He was the son of a quadratura specialist, Domenico Ghislandi, and Flaminia Mansueti; his brother Defendente was also a painter. Between 1670 and 1675 he studied first with Giacomo Cotta, then with Bartolomeo Bianchi. No works survive from this period. Ghislandi was in Venice from 1675 to 1688, where he became a friar of the Order of Minims and joined the monastery of San Francesco di Paola. Even as a professed religious, Ghislandi continued activity as an artist. After returning briefly to Bergamo, he remained in Venice from c. 1689 to 1701/2, working in the studio of Sebastiano Bombelli. His portrait of Bartolomeo Manganoni (Musée d'Art et d'Histoire de Narbonne) may be dated to between 1693 and 1696 and is close in style to Bombelli.

Having refused an invitation from the distinguished patron Cardinal Pietro Ottoboni to move to Rome, Ghislandi settled permanently in Bergamo in 1702, living in the Convento del Galgario, from which he took his name. A series of portraits of members of the Rota family date from immediately after his return from Venice. The portrait of Lodovico Rota (Budapest, Museum of Fine Arts) is a grand, aristocratic work that echoes both Bombelli and the international style of Jan Kupecký (who was active in Venice from 1687), whereas the spatial complexity of his double portrait of Marchese Giuseppe Maria Rota and Capitano Brinzago of Lodi (Bergamo, priv. col.) looks back to Giovanni Battista Moroni; the heavy impasto also reflects an awareness of 16th-century Venetian painting.

Before 1709 Ghislandi visited Milan. The lively realism of his Oletta’s Barber’s Shop Sign (c. 1709; Bergamo, Accademia Carrara) is influenced by Salomon Adler, an artist working in the city at that time, whose art was indebted to Rembrandt. Adler, whose training and style were international, was an important yet sporadic influence on Ghislandi, most obviously in his character heads. There followed, before the end of 1710, a series of portraits of the Secco Suardo counts, of which the most important is that of Conte Gerolamo Secco Suardo (1710; Bergamo, Accademia Carrara). The series is refined and courtly, reflecting the elegance of Bombelli rather than the lively informality of Adler. Ghislandi’s Self-portrait (1712; Bergamo, priv. col.) admirably demonstrates his more incisive and psychologically revealing style of portraiture, which is evident, too, in his portraits of contemporary artists, for example that of Andrea Fantoni (before 1734; Bergamo, priv. col.).

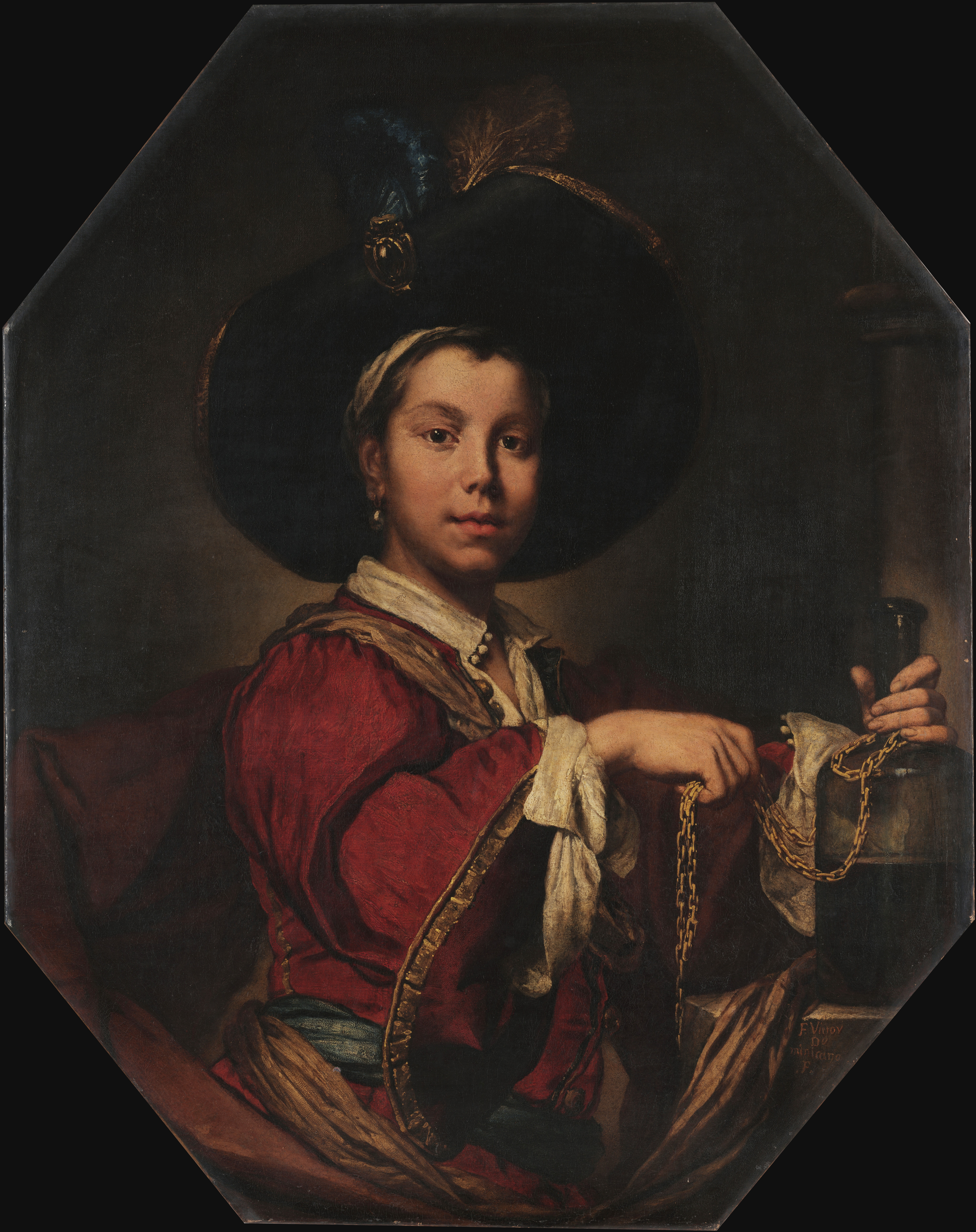
Portrait of a Young Boy (L’Allegrezza), Museo Poldi Pezzoli, Milan

Although isolated in his monastery in Bergamo, Ghislandi was well known in Italy and in Europe. He visited Bologna c. 1717, and was elected to the Accademia Clementina in that year. He was in contact with Bolognese artistic circles and it seems likely that he knew the art of Giuseppe Crespi, whose use of impasto is close to his. Between 1719 and 1733 Ghislandi visited Milan to paint a series of official portraits of the governors of the Duchy of Milan, among them Count Girolamo di Colloredo-Waldsee and Count Wirich Philipp von Daun. Yet Ghislandi was most celebrated for his character heads, those ‘bizarre, whimsical heads that have caused such a stir, even beyond the Alps’. These heads, often of young painters and sculptors, or boys in turbans or tricorns, were painted with great freshness and immediacy, and include the Portrait of a Young Boy (L’Allegrezza) (before 1720; Milan, Museo Poldi Pezzoli), and the Young Painter and Young Sculptor (both Milan, Sforza Castle).

Such works attracted prestigious collectors, among them Prince Eugene of Savoy, who owned four heads, and Marshal Johann Matthias von der Schulenburg, who possessed 11 works by Ghislandi, both portraits and heads, of which only a Portrait of an Unknown Man survives (Landesmuseum Hannover). Ghislandi was in contact with contemporary artists such as Sebastiano Ricci, with whom he exchanged rare painting materials, and Giovanni Battista Tiepolo, who visited him while working on the Cappella Colleoni in Bergamo (1732–3).

The chronology of Ghislandi’s works is complicated by the almost total absence of any documented works. His portraits of Conte Giovanni Domenico Albani and Contessa Paola Calepio Albani (both 1724; Milan, priv. col.), court portraits that exploit to the full the physical properties of paint, are rare dated works. The portrait of Francesco Maria Bruntino (Bergamo, Accademia Carrara), antiquarian, bookseller, dealer and collector, is distinguished by an affectionate realism that contrasts with the psychological remoteness with which Ghislandi portrayed the Knight of the Order of St. John of Jerusalem , the so-called Gentleman with a Tricorn Hat (Milan, Museo Poldi Pezzoli). This work is tantamount to a judgement, characteristic of the Age of Enlightenment, on the moral degeneracy of the contemporary nobility.

Ghislandi’s portraits convey a wide range of feelings, from the friendly affability of his portrait of a Gentleman in Red (Milan, Museo Poldi Pezzoli) to the harsh and penetrating realism of his portrait of Clelia Bondui (Rome, priv. col.). His late works, which include a Self-portrait (1732; Bergamo, Accademia Carrara) and his portrait of Francesco Biara (1736; Bergamo, priv. col.), are characterized by a dissolution of form reminiscent of Titian’s late style. This is perhaps no accident, for Ghislandi apparently destroyed a Head by Titian by peeling off the layers of paint to discover the secret of that artist’s expressive handling. Ghislandi died in Bergamo in December 1743. Among his pupils were Paolo Bonomino, Cesare Femi, and Pietro Gualdi.

== Works ==
- Giovane con bicchiere di vino e natura morta con pane e cipolla
- Giovane con turbante
- Portrait of a Young Boy (L’Allegrezza), Museo Poldi Pezzoli, Milan

=== Portraits ===
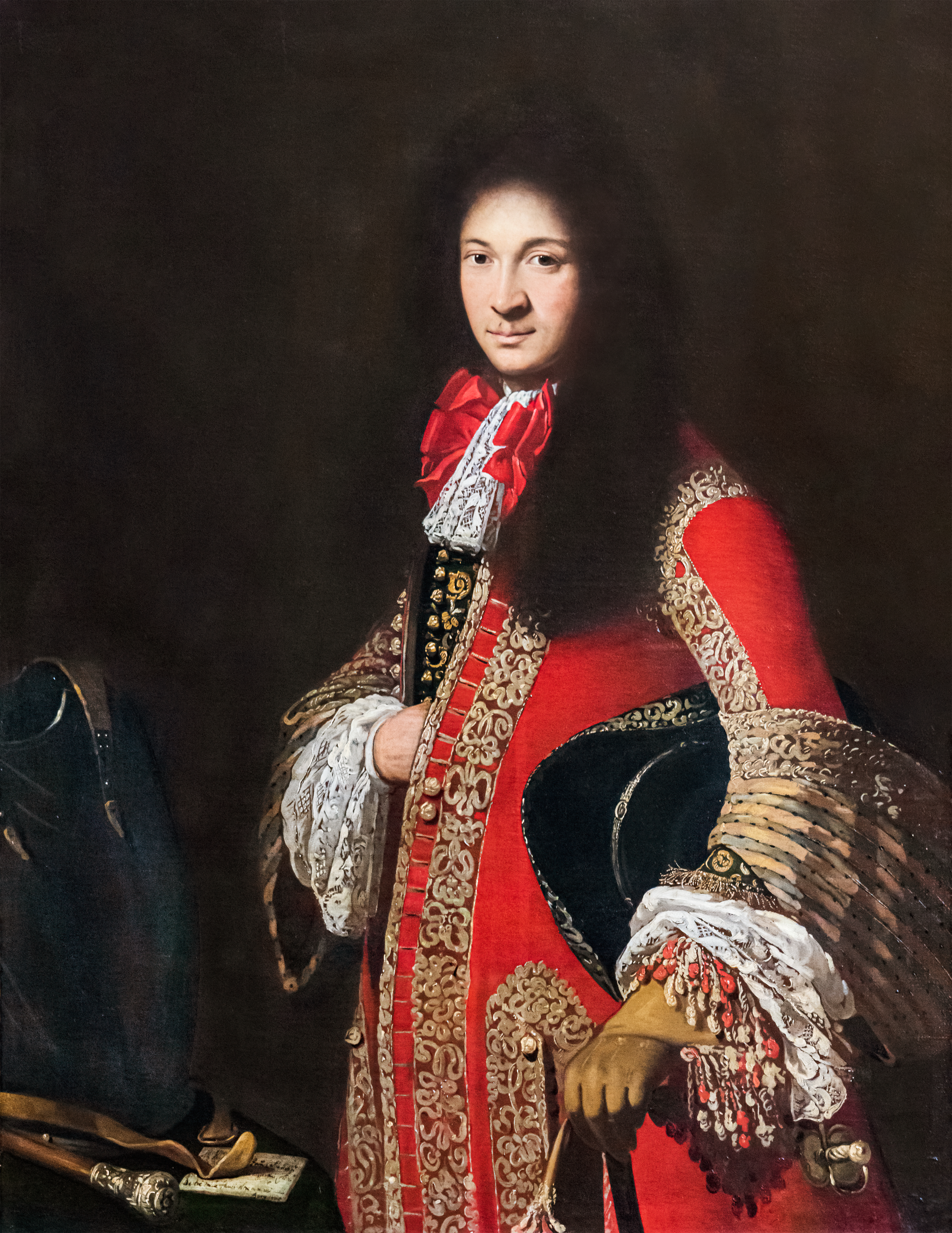
Portrait of Bartolomeo Manganoni, 1693-1696, Musée d'Art et d'Histoire, Narbonne

- Portrait of a Young Girl, National Museum of Fine Arts of Algiers;
- Portrait of count Giovanni Battista Vailetti, Gallerie dell'Accademia, Venice;
- Accademia Carrara, Bergamo:
  - Portrait of Francesco Maria Bruntino;
  - Portrait of the Advocate Giacomo Bettami de' Bazini;
  - Portrait of G. Secco Suardo;
  - Portrait of Count Galeatius Secco Suardo (1681-1733);
  - Portrait of the Gentleman of Finardi's House (1710);
  - Gentlewoman (around 1710);
- Luigi Koelliker collection:
  - Portrait of Gian Domenico Tassi (between 1710–15);
- Portrait of Clara Benaglio Finardi (1710), priv. coll.;
- Giovanni Secco Suardo and Servant (1711);
- Portrait of Count Giovan Battista Vailetti (1720), Galleria dell'Accademia, Venice;
- Portrait of Count Andra Asperti With His Son;
- Portrait of Count Bartolomeo Secco Suardo in Arms;
- Portrait of Count Filippo Marenzi;
- Portrait of Count Gerolamo Secco Suardo;
- Portrait of Count Giovan Battista Vailetti;
- Portrait of Dottor Bernardi;
- Portrait of Marquess Giuseppe Maria Rota and Captain Antonio Brinzago da Lodi;
- Portrait of Marshal Matthias von der Schulenburg;
- Portrait of Sculptor Andrea Fantoni;
- Portrait of the Advocate Giacomo Bettami de' Bazini;
- Portrait of Bartolomeo Manganoni;
- Portrait of Bertrama Daina de' Valsecchi;
- Portrait of Carlo Tinti;
- Portrait of Domenico Ghislandi;
- Portrait of Elizabeth Piavana Ghidotti;
- Portrait of Young Sculptor, University of Arizona Art Museum, Tucson;
- Portrait of a Lady.

=== Busts ===
- Bust of Vitellio Imperatore;
- Bust of a Poet Laureate.
Fra’ Galgario

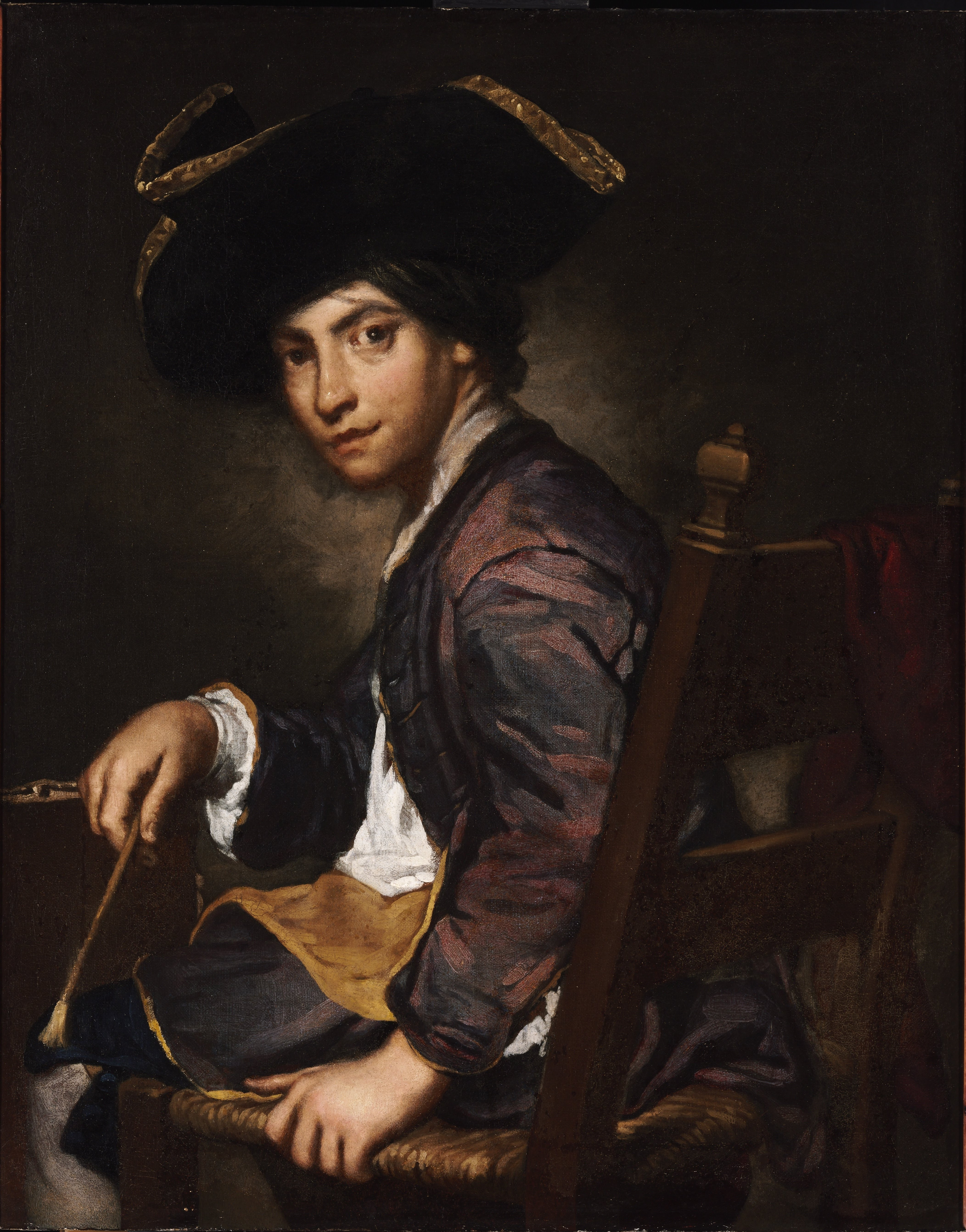
Portrait of a Young Painter in His Studio, Museum of Fine Arts, Budapest

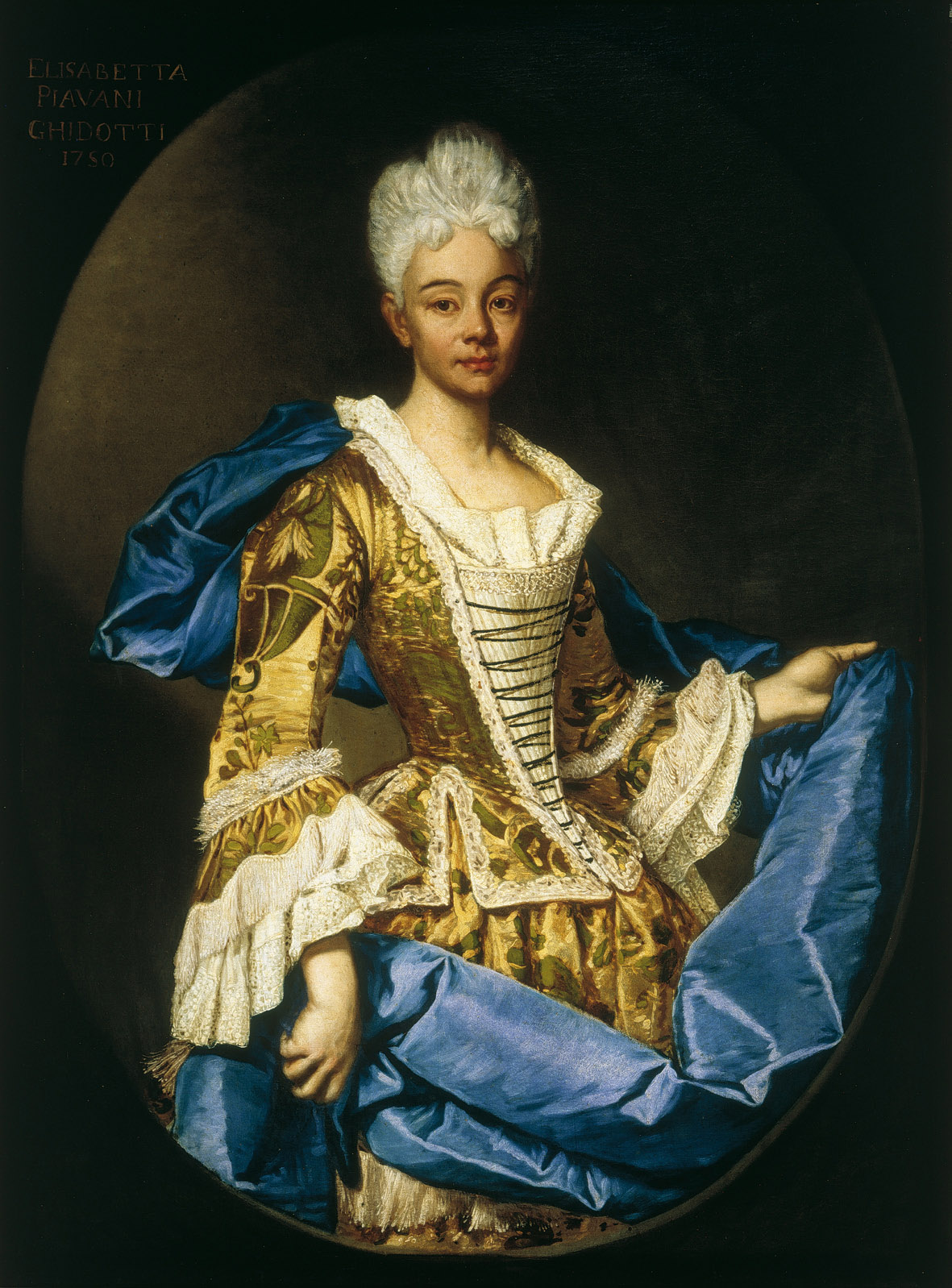
Portrait of Elisabetta Piavani Ghidotti, Accademia Carrara, Bergamo

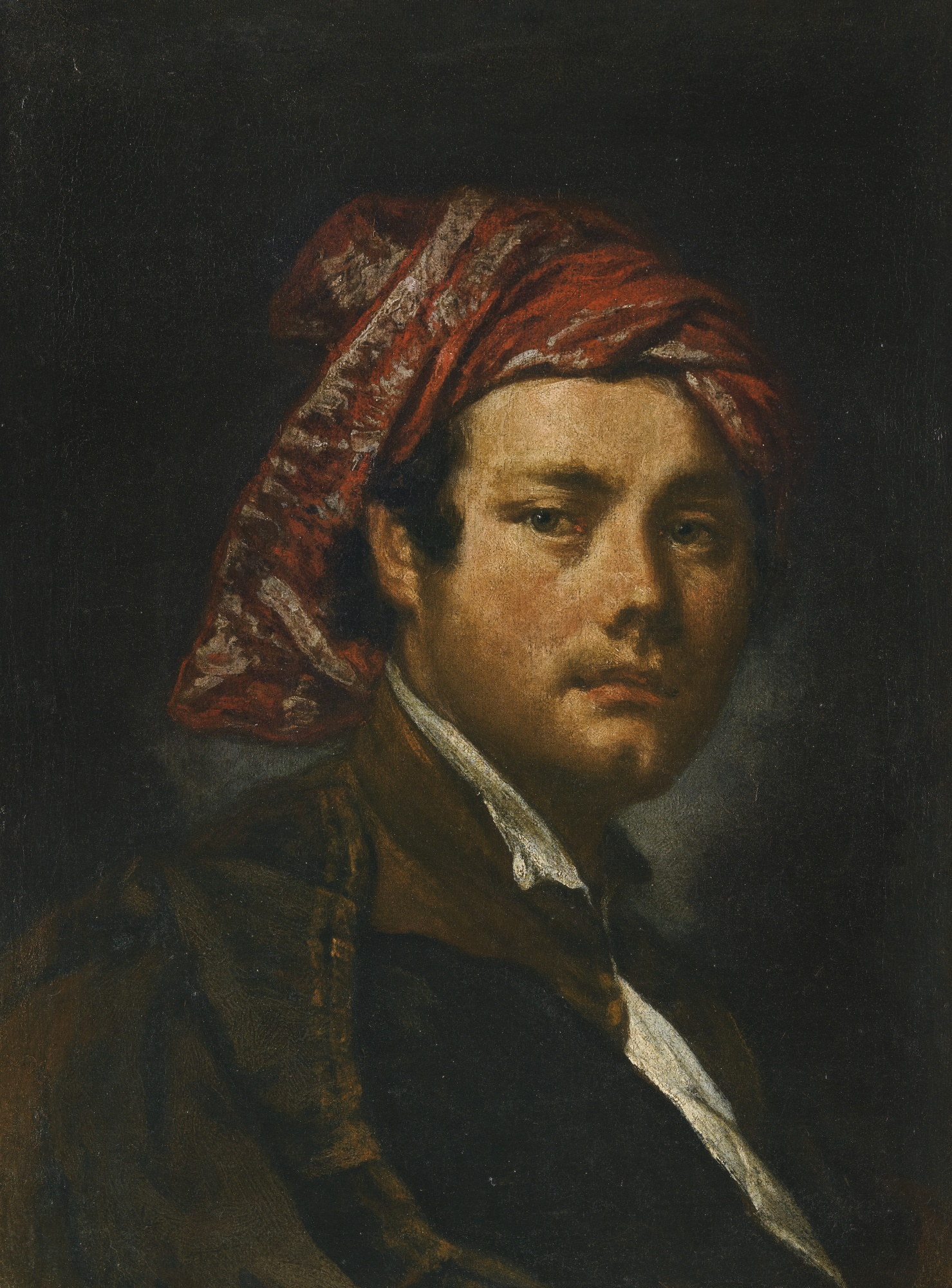
Portrait of a Man Wearing a Red Headscarf, priv, col.

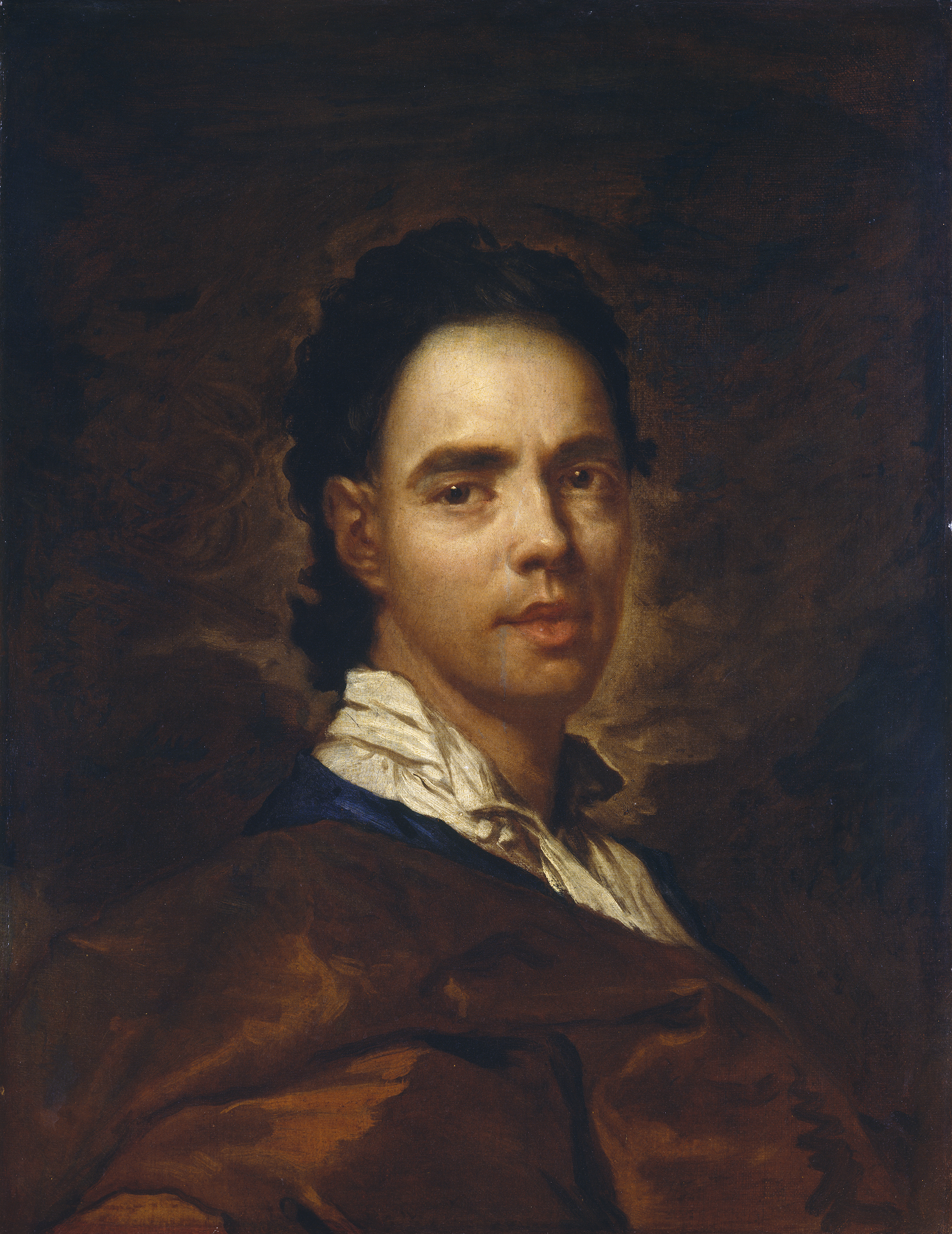
Portrait of a Young Man, National Gallery of Art, Washington, D.C.

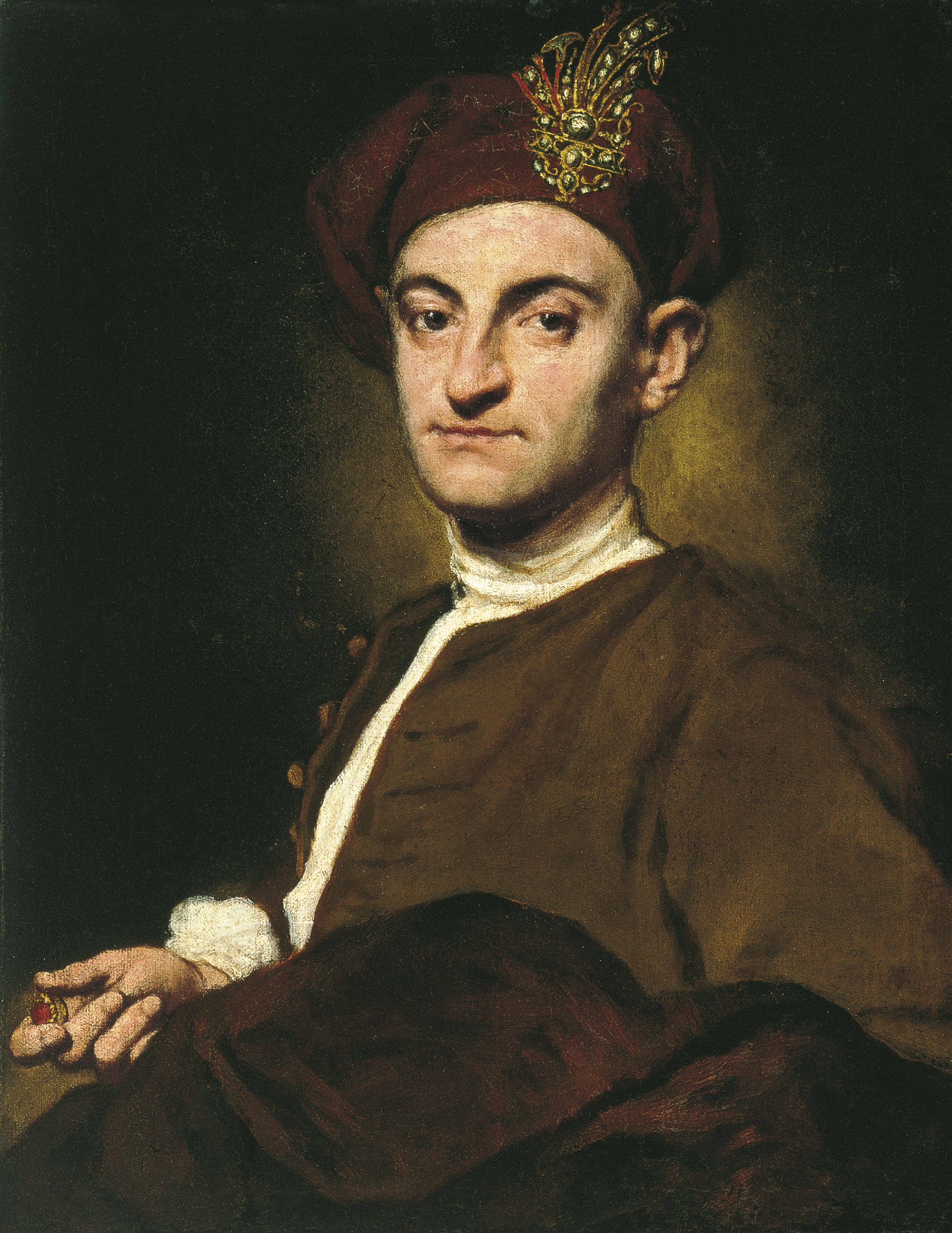
Portrait of a Goldsmith, Thyssen-Bornemisza Museum, Madrid

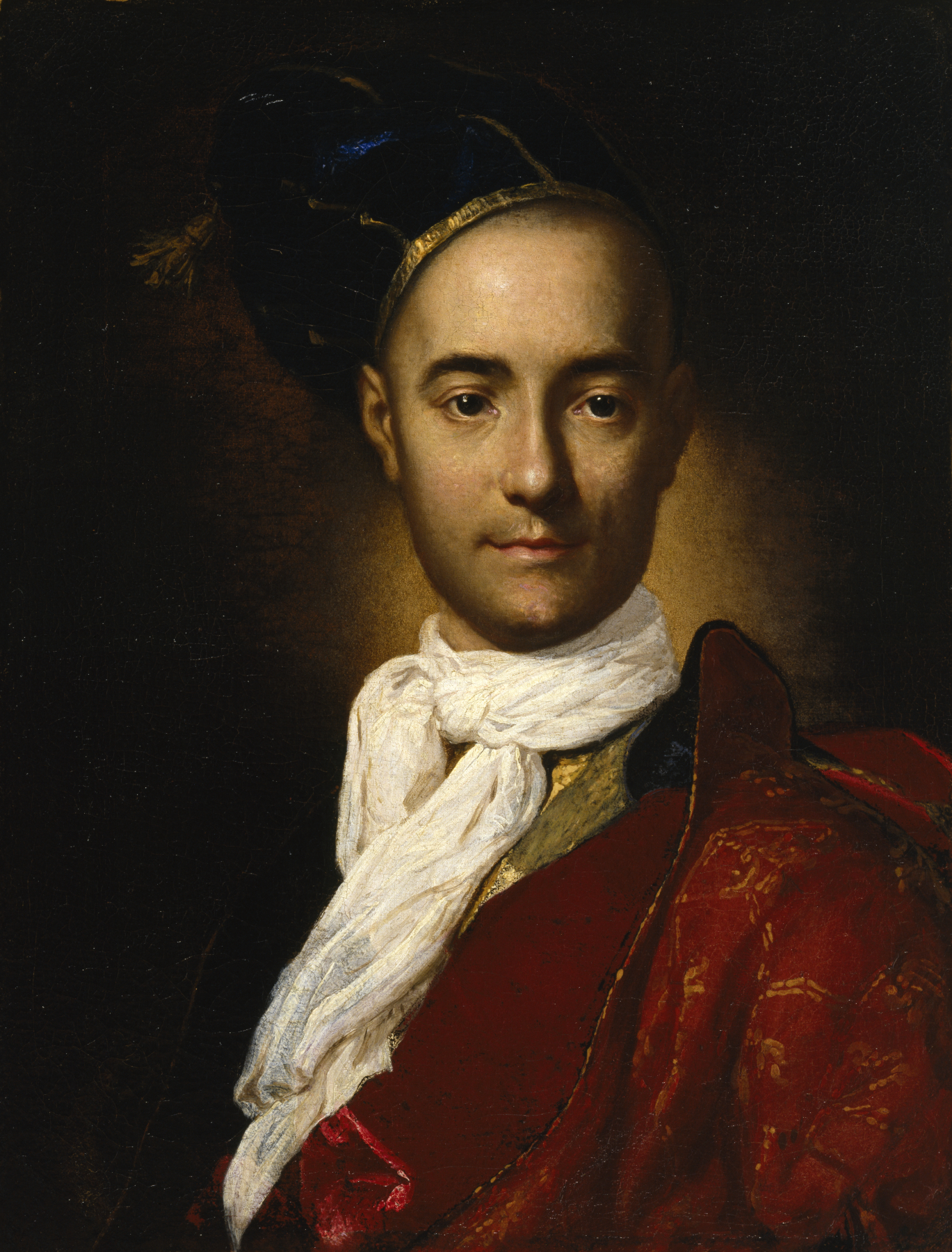
Portrait of a Young Nobleman, Walters Art Museum, Baltimore

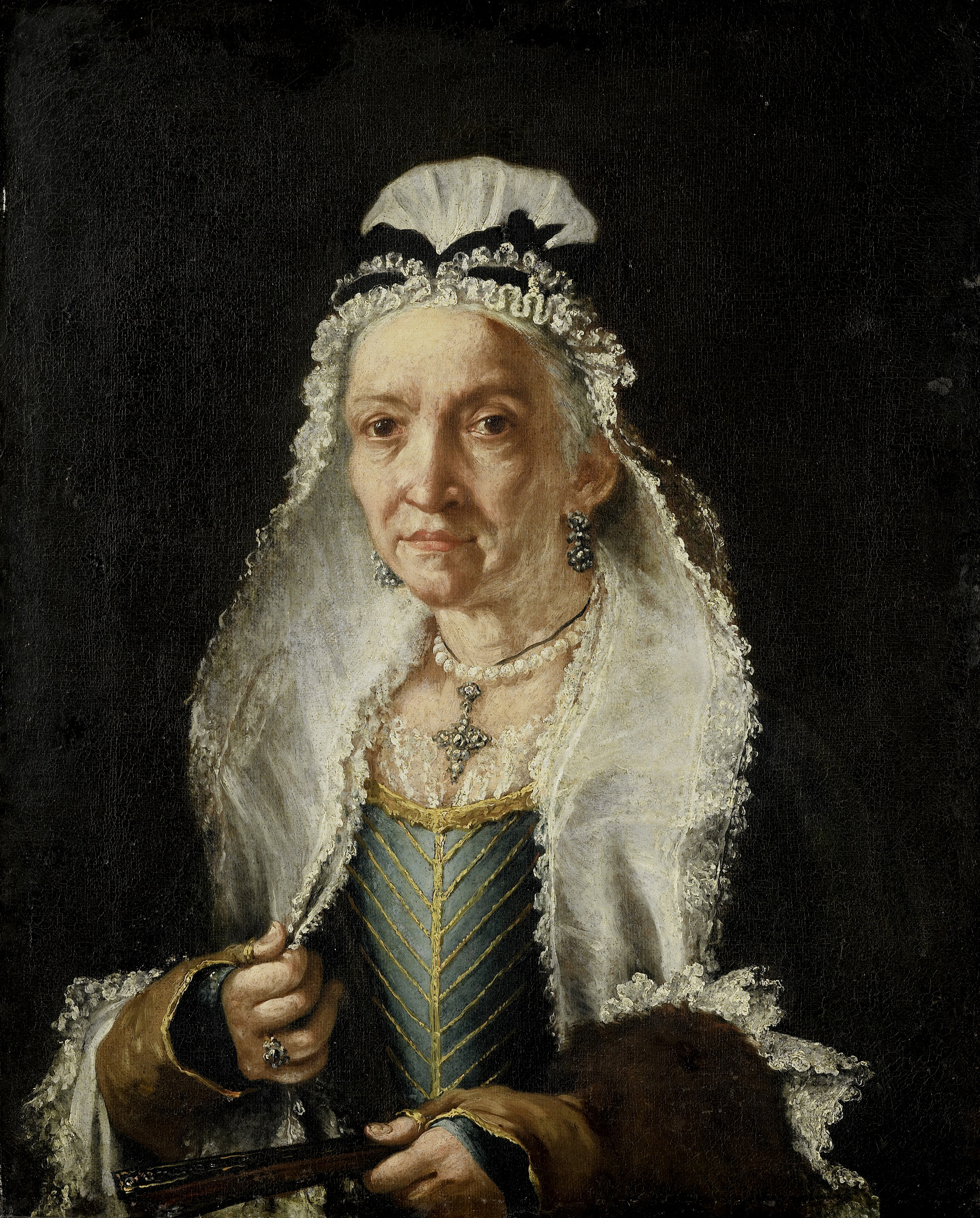
Portrait of an Old Lady, Rijksmuseum, Amsterdam

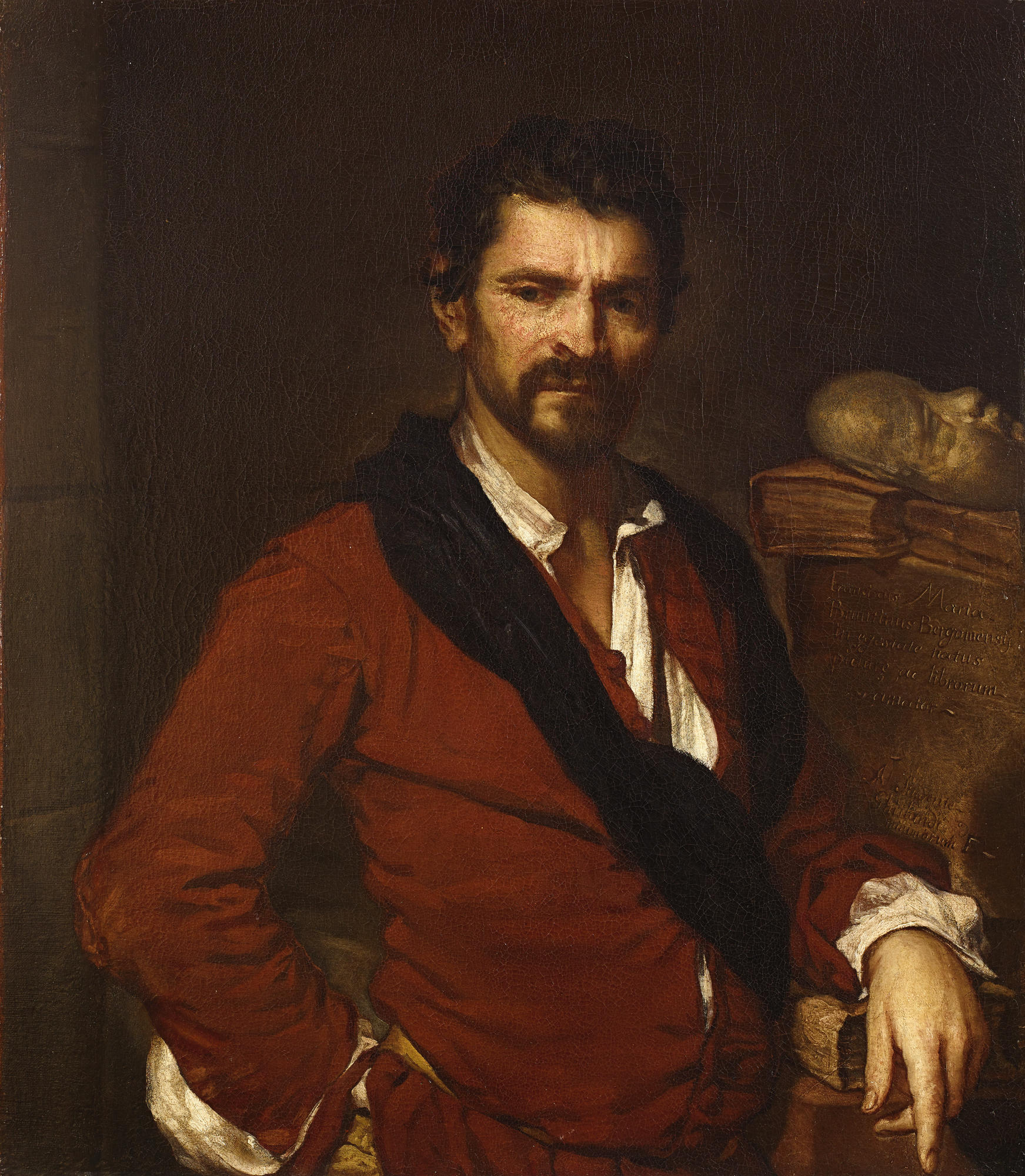
Portrait of Francesco Maria Bruntino, Accademia Carrara, Bergamo

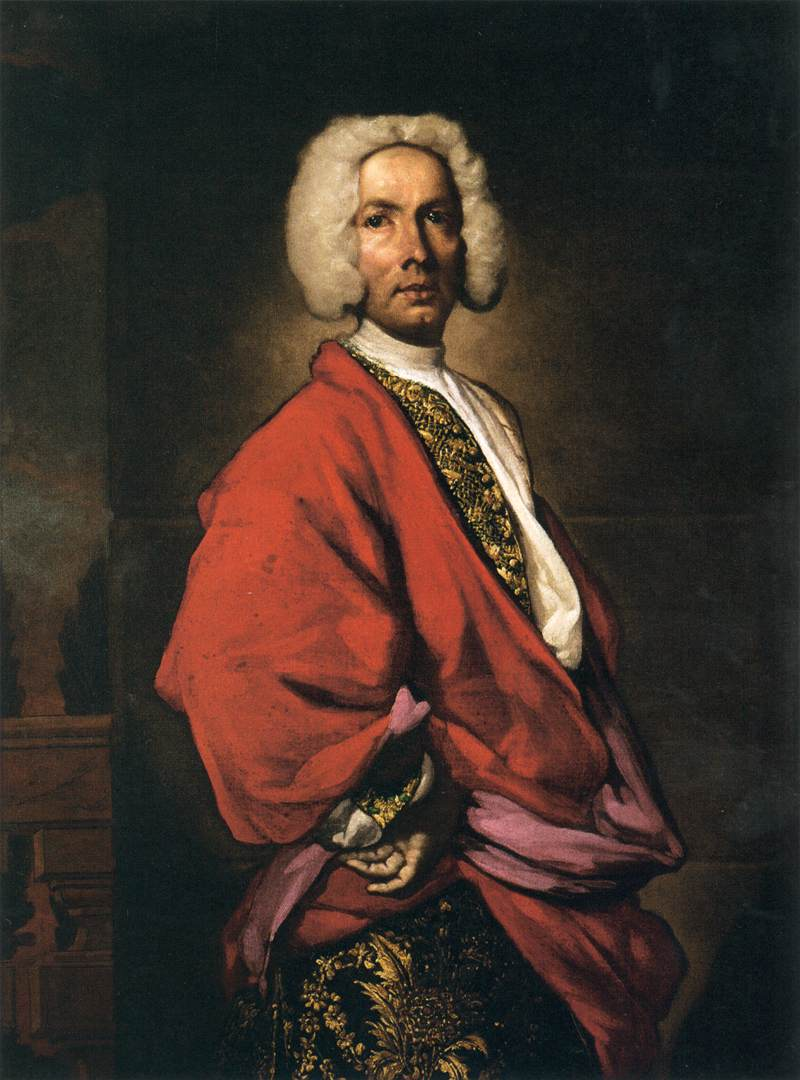
Portrait of Count Galeozzo Secco Suardo, Louvre, Paris

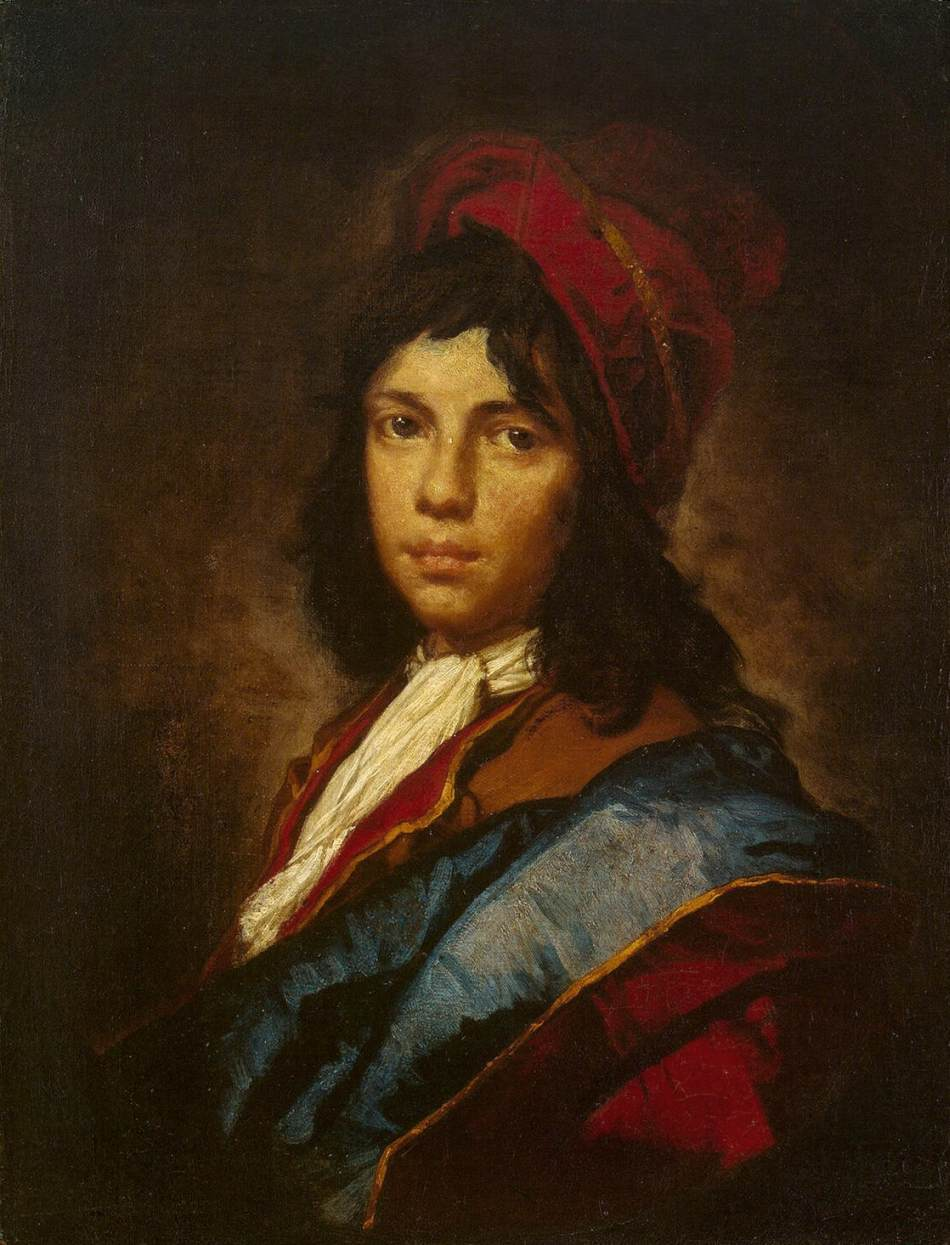
Portrait of a Boy, Hermitage Museum, Saint Petersburg

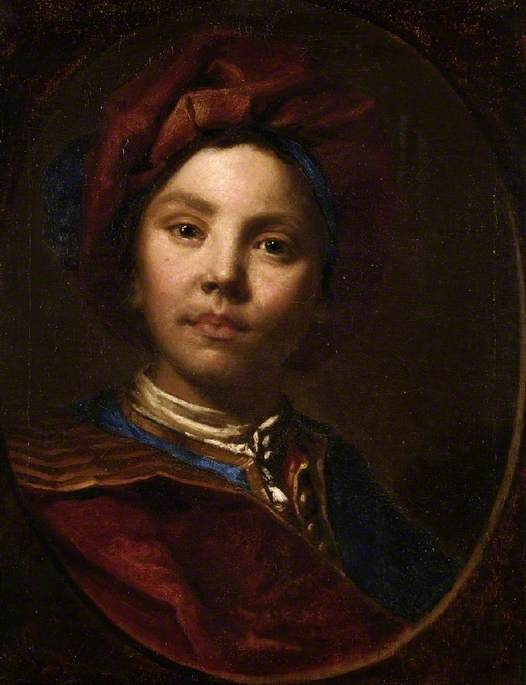
Boy in Red, Fitzwilliam Museum, Cambridge

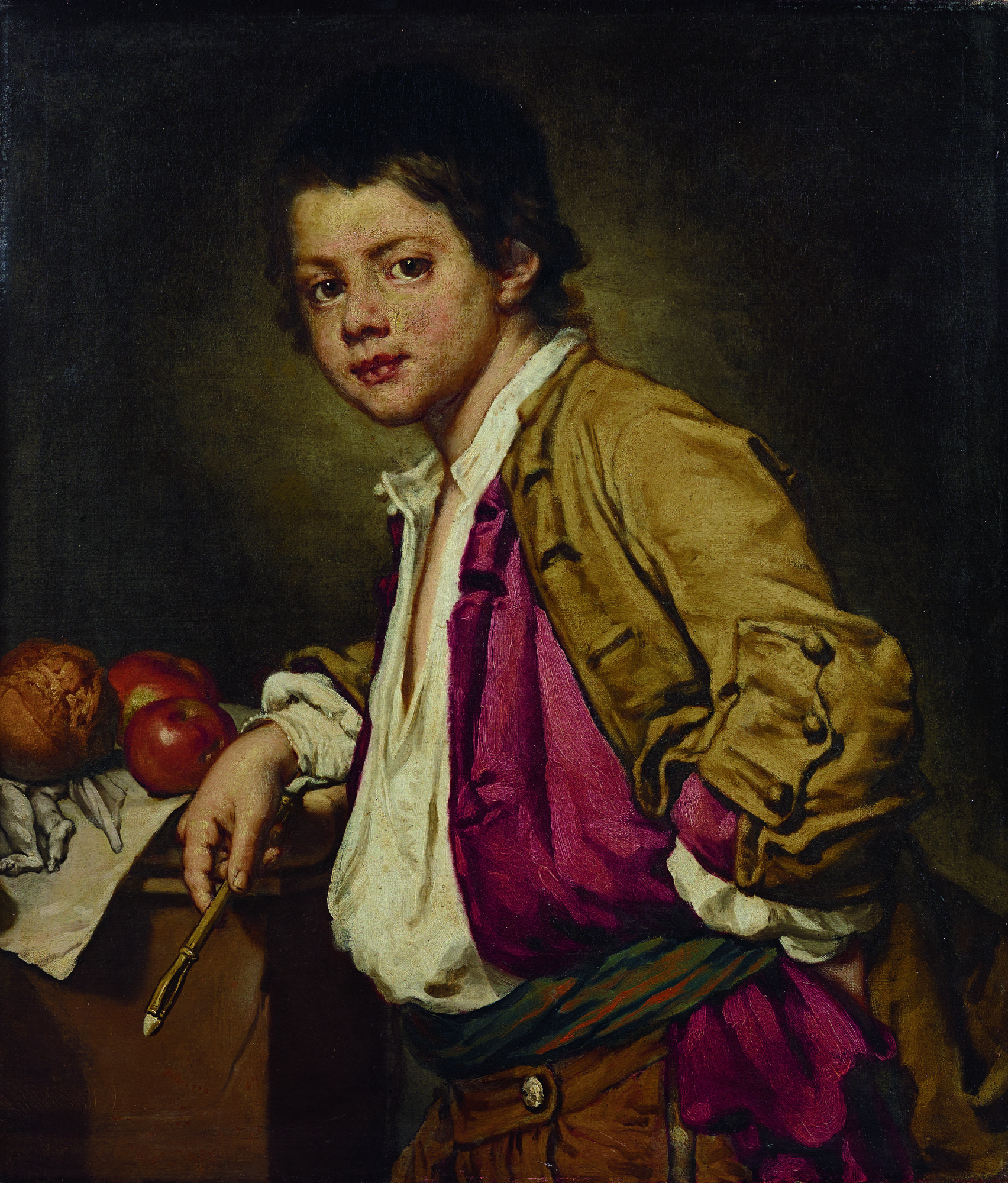
Portrait of a Young Painter, Accademia Carrara, Bergamo

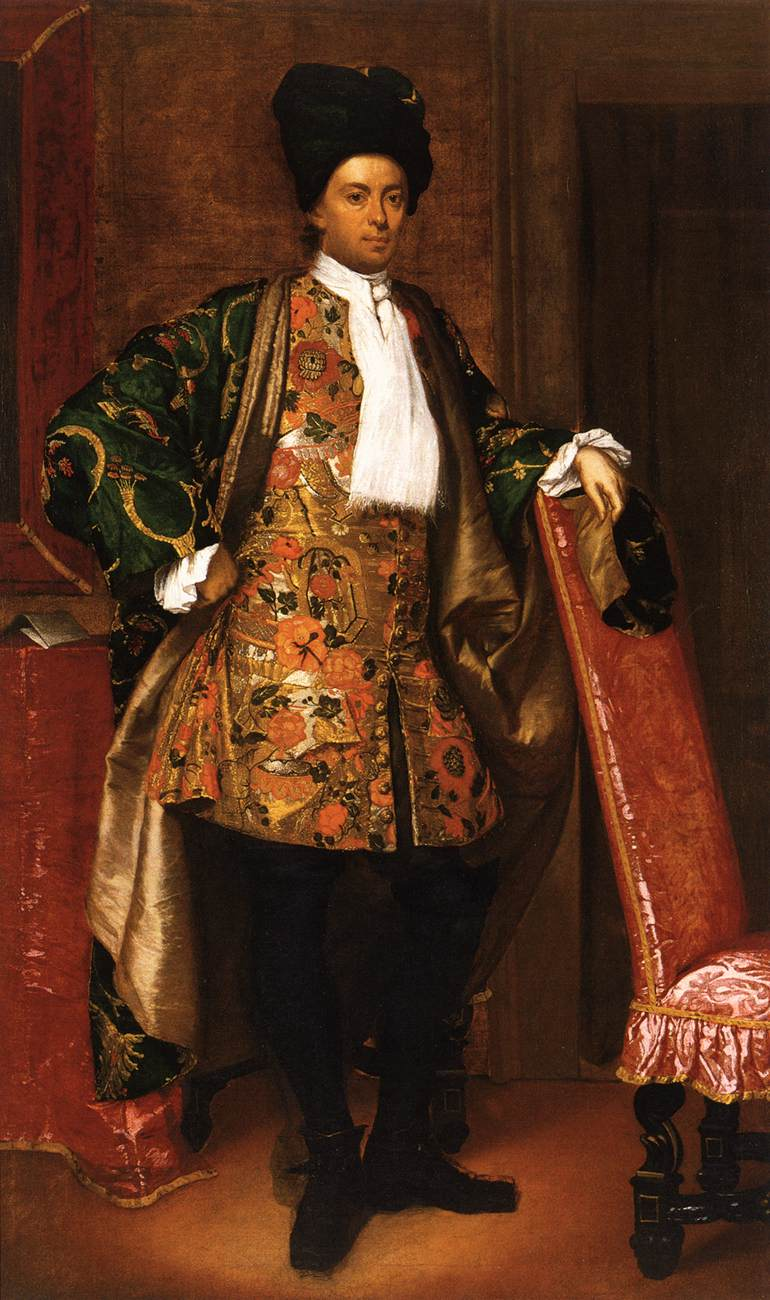
Portrait of Count Giovanni Battista Vailetti, Gallerie dell'Accademia, Venice

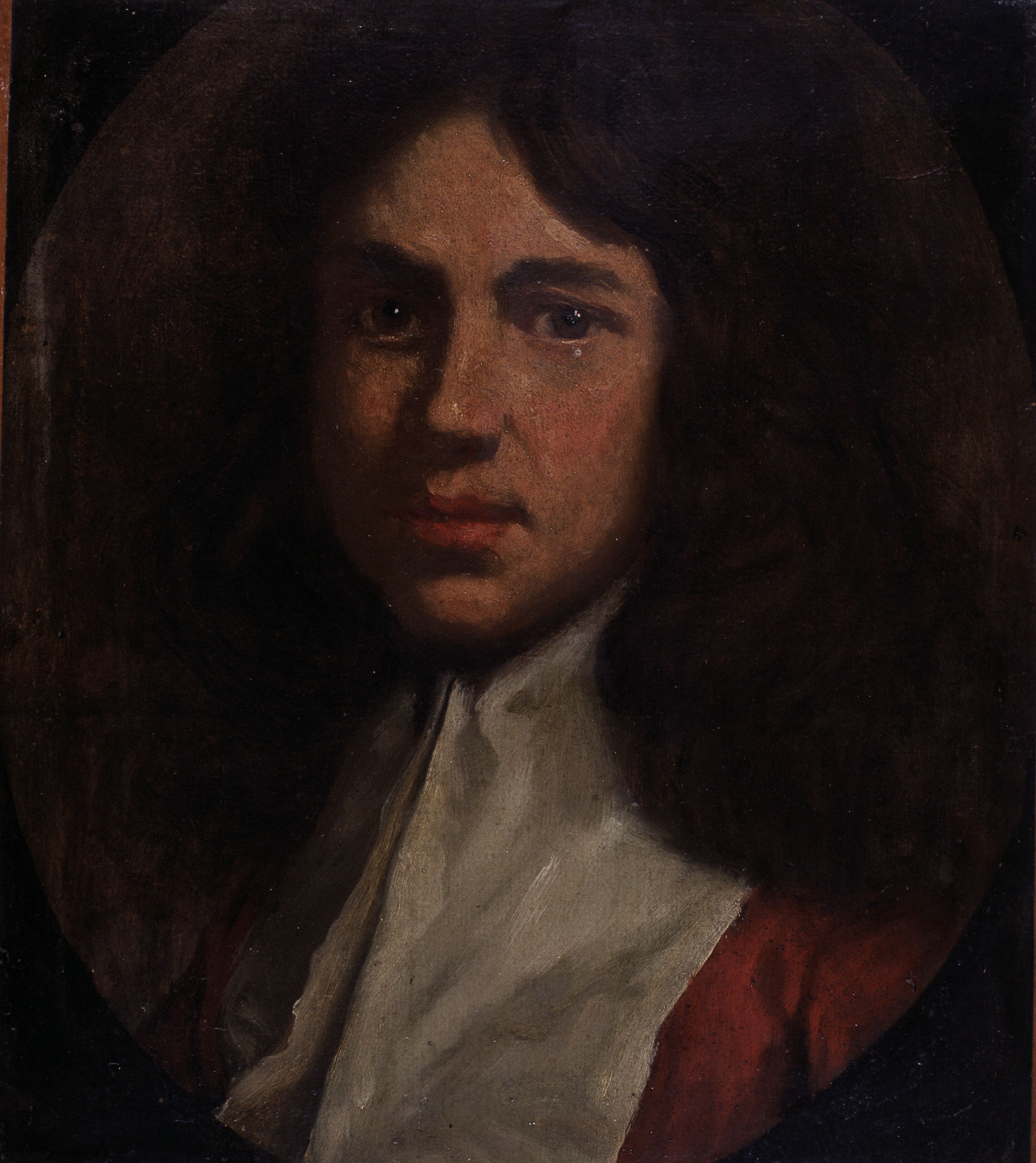
Portrait of a Young Man, Museum of Fine Arts, Ghent

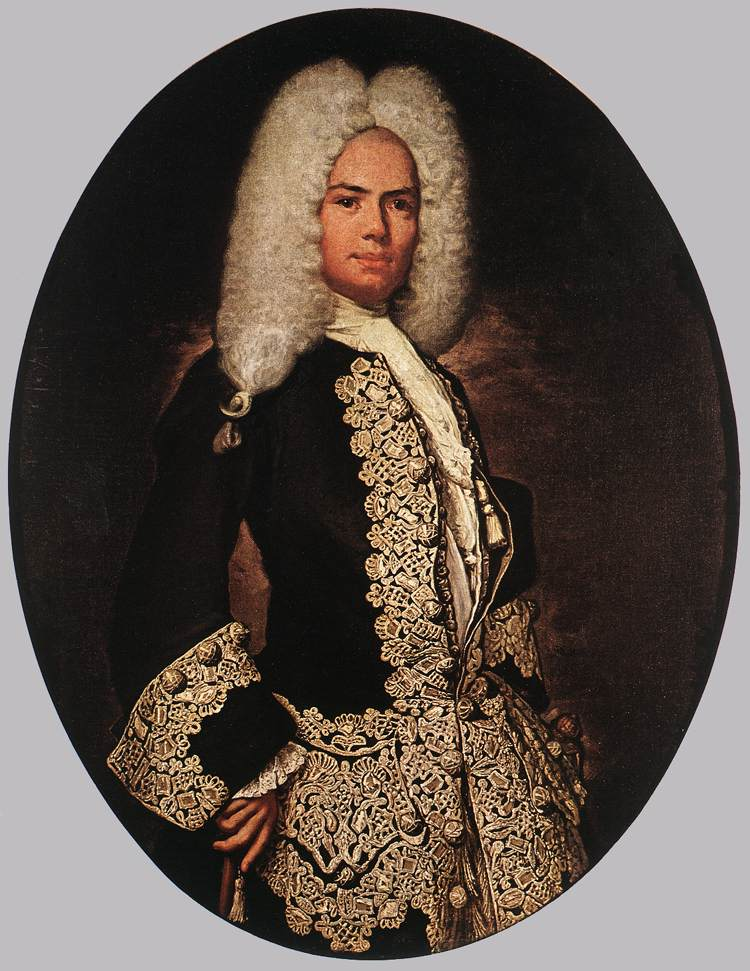
Portrait of a Gentleman, Pinacoteca di Brera, Milan

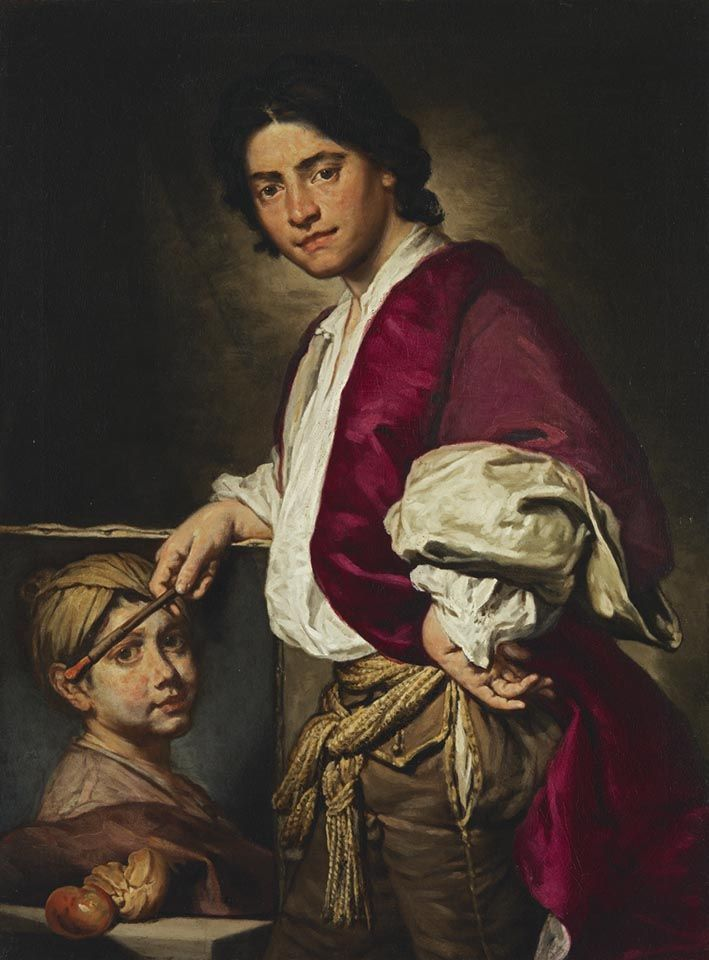
Portrait of a young painter with a boy's portrait, Bavarian State Painting Collections, Munich

== Bibliography ==
- Tassi, Francesco Maria (1970) [1793]. F. Mazzini (ed.). Vite de’ pittori, scultori ed architetti bergamaschi. Vol. 2. Milan: In Bergamo Dalla Stamperia Locatelli. pp. 57–69.
- Brinton, Selwyn (1912). "Fra Vittore Ghislandi". The Burlington Magazine. 21 (114): 350–353, 357. JSTOR 859140.
- Wittkower, Rudolf (1993). "Art and Architecture Italy, 1600-1750". Pelican History of Art. 1980. Penguin Books Ltd. p. 493.
- Frangi, Francesco (2000). "GHISLANDI, Vittore, detto Fra Galgario". Dizionario Biografico degli Italiani (in Italian). Vol. 54: Ghiselli–Gimma. Rome: Istituto dell'Enciclopedia Italiana. ISBN 978-88-12-00032-6.
