= Domenico Ghislandi =

Italian painter (c. 1620–1717)

Domenico Ghislandi (c. 1620–1717) was an Italian painter, mainly active in Bergamo as a quadratura painter during the Baroque period.

He was born circa 1620 in Bergamo. He is perhaps better known due to his son Vittore Ghislandi, called Fra Galgario, who was born in 1655 in Bergamo. Domenico painted decorations for the Palazzo Pelliccioli del Portone in Alzano Lombardo. He painted some of the quadrature (1645) in the Sala Rossa of Palazzo Terzi that has figures later painted by Johann Christoph Storer.
