= Canton Synagogue =

Former Orthodox synagogue, now Jewish museum, in Venice, Italy

- Italian: Scuola Canton
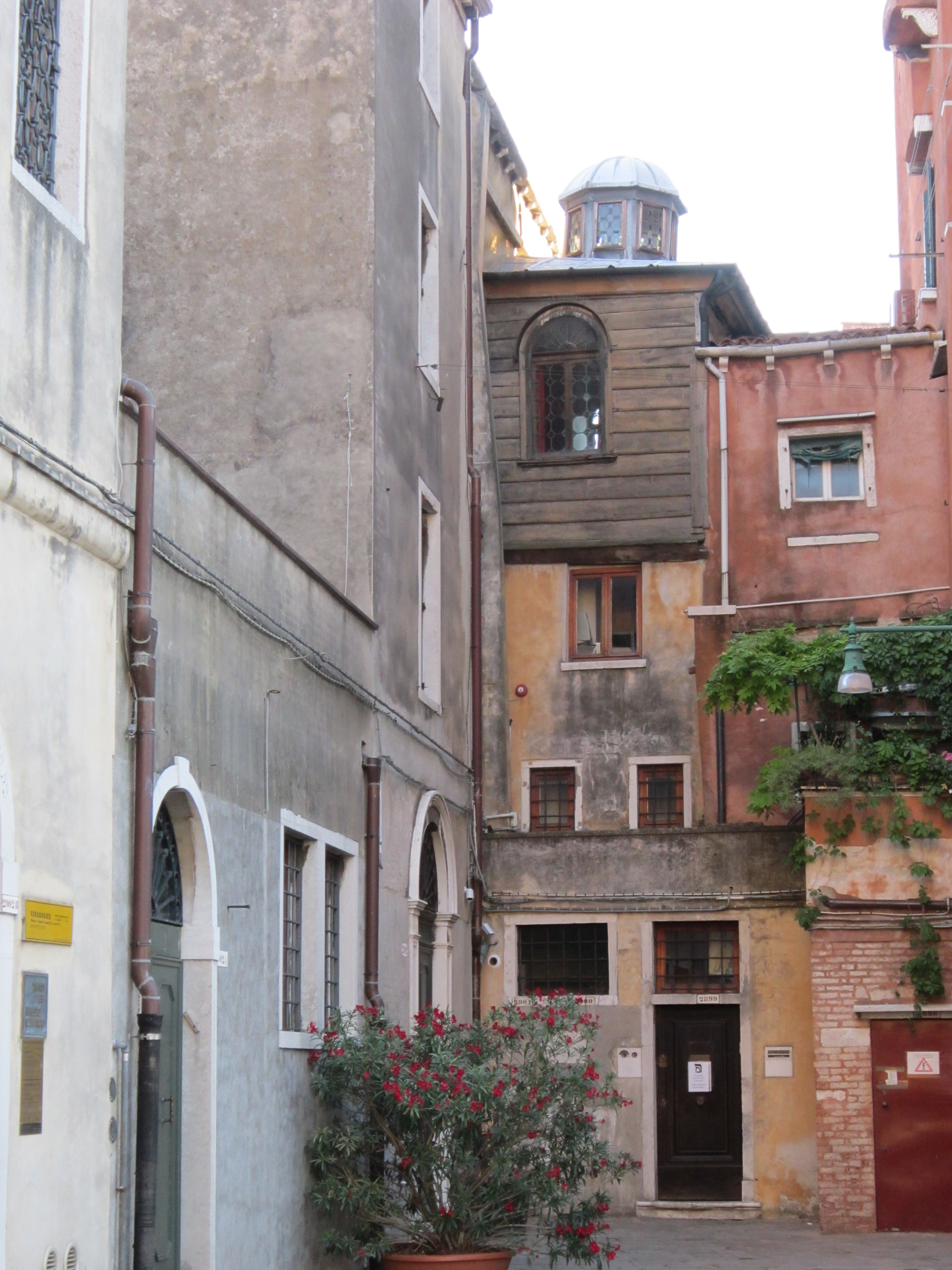
- The former synagogue, now Jewish museum, from the square of the Ghetto Nuovo, in 2012

- Location of the former synagogue in Venice

Religion
- Affiliation: Orthodox Judaism (former)
- Rite: Provençal; Nusach Ashkenaz
- Ecclesiastical or organisational status: Synagogue (1532–1917); Jewish museum (since 1989)
- Status: Inactive (as a synagogue); Repurposed

Location
- Location: Jewish Ghetto, Venice
- Country: Italy
- Coordinates: 45°26′42″N 12°19′36″E

Architecture
- Type: Synagogue architecture
- Style: Baroque; Rococo
- Funded by: Cantoni family
- Groundbreaking: 1531
- Completed: 1532

Specifications
- Length: 12.7 to 12.9 m (42 to 42 ft)
- Width: 6.5 to 7.1 m (21 to 23 ft)
- Dome: One
- Materials: Stone

The Canton Synagogue (Italian: Scuola Canton) is a former Orthodox Jewish congregation and synagogue, that is located in the Jewish Ghetto of Venice, Italy.

Completed in 1532, it is the second oldest Venetian synagogue, after the nearby Scuola Grande Tedesca (1528), and one of five synagogues that were established in the ghetto. Its origins are uncertain: it might have been constructed as a prayer room for a group of Provençal Jews soon after their arrival in Venice, or as a private synagogue for a prominent local family. Repeatedly remodelled throughout its history, its interior is predominantly decorated in the Baroque and Rococo styles.

Ceased operating as a synagogue in 1917, the former synagogue building was restored between 2016 and 2017 by the World Monuments Fund. No longer used for regular worship, it is open to the public as a Jewish museum through the Jewish Museum of Venice.

== Name ==
Like the other four synagogues in Venice, the Canton Synagogue was termed a scuola ("School") rather than sinagoga ("synagogue"), in the same way in which Ashkenazi Jews refer to the synagogue as the shul (שול) in Yiddish. In the Venetian context, however, the term has a further connotation: Scuola was the name given to Christian confraternity institutions devoted to assisting those in need, the most famous of which were the six Scuole Grandi of Venice. The building of the Canton Synagogue hosted the headquarters of several charitable and aid organizations throughout the centuries, similarly to what happened in the adjacent Scuola Italiana.

Among the several proposed etymologies for the word Canton, the generally accepted one links it to the site's ancient toponym, canton del medras (midrash's corner), referring to the building's position in the southern corner of the square of the Ghetto Nuovo. (Note: Analogously, another corner of the square was called canton del forno (bakery's corner).) According to another hypothesis, the word derives from the Canton (or Cantoni) family which allegedly financed the synagogue's construction; this hypothesis is supported by the fact that three Jewish prayer rooms once located in the Ghetto Nuovo (Scuola Luzzatto, Scuola Coanim and Scuola Meshullamim) bore the names of their founding families. (Note: The Ghetto's three prayer rooms were originally built as private synagogues by the Ghetto's most prominent Jewish families. Two of them still exist to this day: the Scuola Coanim (originally located near the sotoportego de Gheto Novo, later dismantled and partially reassembled on the ground floor of the Scuola Grande Spagnola in 1893) and the Scuola Luzzatto (first built on the Campo de Gheto Novo, and moved into the ground floor of the Scuola Levantina in 1836).)

== History ==
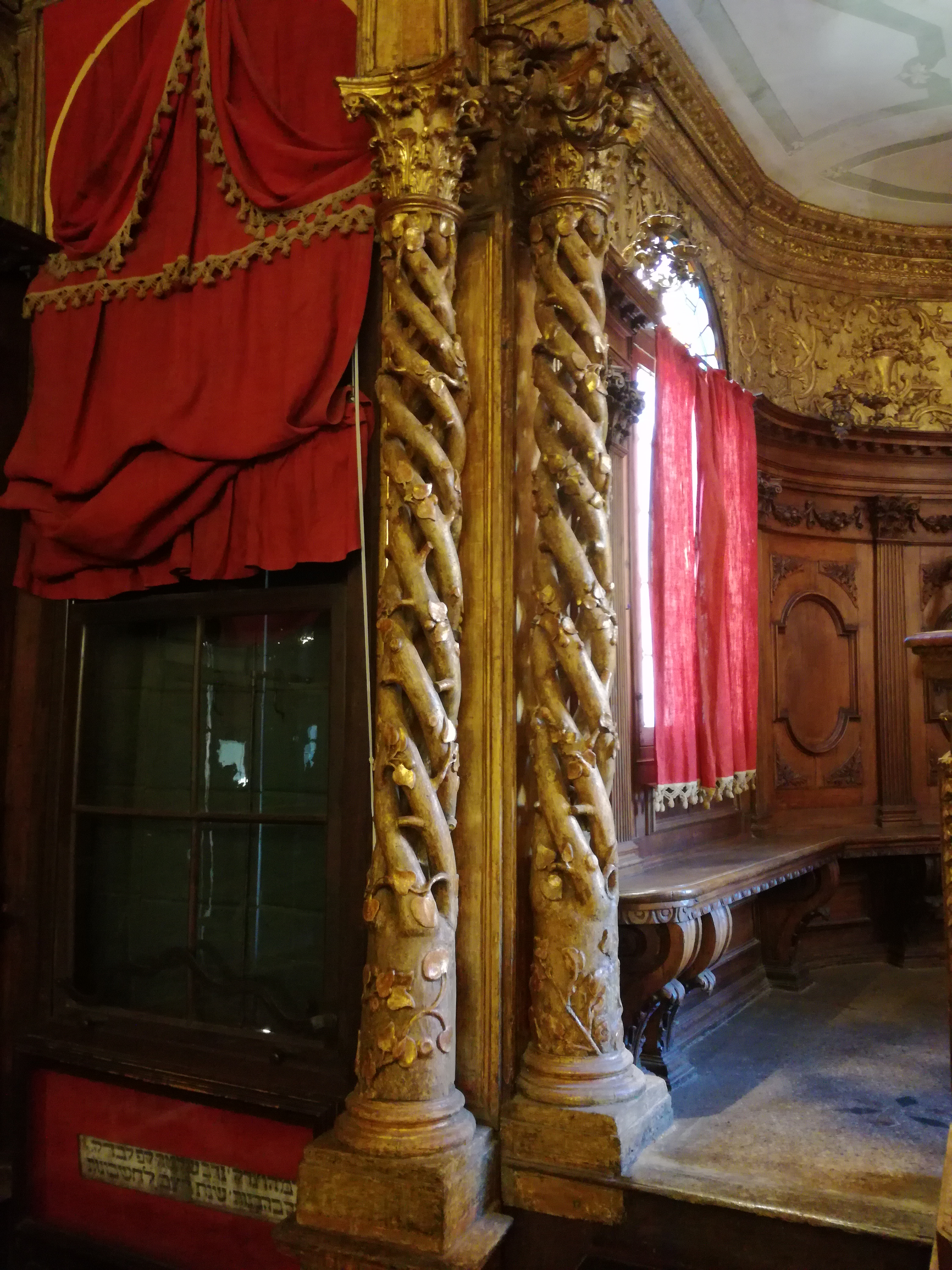
The two wooden columns placed on the left-hand side of the bimah. On the lower left corner is the inscription recording the gift of 180 ducats in 1532 for the synagogue's construction

The Canton Synagogue is one of the three synagogues located in the Ghetto Nuovo (the oldest part of the Venetian Ghetto, established on 29 March 1516), together with the Scuola Grande Tedesca and Scuola Italiana. It was built between 1531 and 1532 by members of the local Ashkenazi community. A stone plaque placed to the left of the bimah records the gift of 180 ducats, donated by a man named Shlomo in 1532 for the synagogue's construction. The same date (5292 according to the Hebrew calendar) is displayed over the entrance door.

The establishment of the Canton Synagogue, only four years after that of the nearby Scuola Grande Tedesca, also of Ashkenazi rite, may point to an emerging division within the local Ashkenazi community. Evidence suggests that the new synagogue might have been in fact erected by a group of Provençal Jews soon after their arrival in Venice, in a period marked by a sharp increase in the Jewish population of Venice due to immigration from nearby countries. (Note: The number of Jews moving into the Ghetto saw a rapid increase with the outbreak of the War of the League of Cambrai, as several Jews who had settled in the Venice mainland chose to seek refuge in the city.) Provençal Jews were forced to leave Arles en masse following the annexation of Provence to France (1484), with many of them opting to settle in Italy. Several elements seem to prove the Provençal origins of the Canton Synagogue: for instance, it was the only Venetian synagogue where the Lekhah Dodi—a hymn commonly intoned by French Jews on the eve of Sabbath—was sung. Moreover, the synagogue's "bifocal effect" (created by the bimah and the ark facing each other at the opposite ends of the sanctuary), an arrangement rarely seen in old European synagogues, is a common feature of Provençal synagogue buildings, such as those of Carpentras and Cavaillon. (Note: The Canton Synagogue and the Cavaillon synagogue, in particular, show several similarities in their arrangements. For example, both buildings feature a raised women's gallery which is directly connected to the prayer hall through a series of steps.)

The synagogue building originally hosted both religious and social functions: the ground floor was occupied by the coffin warehouse of the Fraterna della Misericordia degli Hebrei Tedeschi, a Jewish institution which provided burial services for members of the community (replaced in the nineteenth century by the Fraterna dei Poveri), while the second floor housed the local Talmud Torah school (Fraterna sive Scuola Talmud Torah di Ghetto Nuovo).

The Canton Synagogue was remodelled multiple times throughout the sixteenth, seventeenth, and eighteenth centuries, with the most important interventions taking place in the late 1630s and 1650s, 1730s, and 1770s. Along with the other synagogues of Venice, it ceased to be regularly used in October 1917, when the local Jewish community was forced to disband; (Note: In the days of the Battle of Caporetto, many Venetian Jews were transferred to Livorno—another Italian city home to an important Jewish community—as a precaution against an Austro-Hungarian invasion.) at the same time, administration of all the Jewish places of worship was taken over by a single institution, the Templi Israelitici Uniti.

Starting in 1968, the building underwent major restoration interventions operated by the World Monuments Fund and the Italian Ministry for Cultural Assets and Environments, which included stabilization of the foundations and wall insulation. In 1989 the synagogue was finally reopened to the public, as part of a new museum area combining all three synagogues of the Ghetto Nuovo, as well as the Venice Museum of Jewish Art (established in 1953, now the Jewish Museum of Venice). More recent conservation campaigns were carried out by the WMF in 2014 and in 2016–2017, with support from the David Berg Foundation.

== Architecture ==
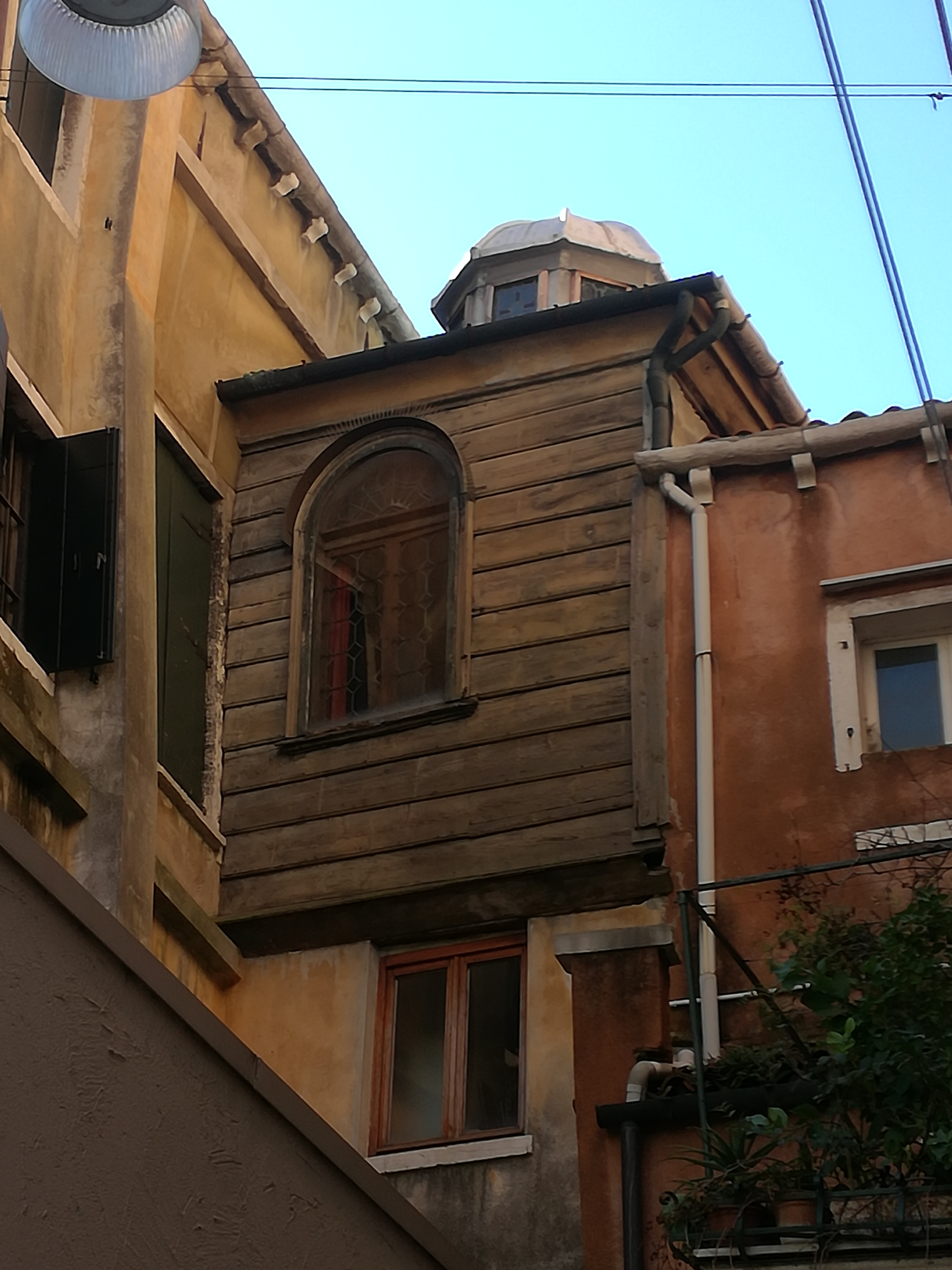
For the observer standing in the square of the Ghetto Nuovo, the little cupola above the bimah is the only visible sign of the presence of the synagogue

The synagogue's main room features a rectangular plan which is only slightly asymmetrical, measuring 12.9 m × 7.1 m × 12.7 m × 6.5 m (42 ft × 23 ft × 42 ft × 21 ft), in contrast to the marked irregularity of the ground plan in the nearby Scuola Grande Tedesca. It occupies an inconspicuous spot on the third floor of a four-story vernacular building facing the Ghetto's main square, and is hardly noticeable from the outside. An anonymous exterior was an indispensable feature for synagogues built in Venice in the early decades of the sixteenth century, since Jewish places of worship—although tolerated—were still formally prohibited at that time. The synagogue stands on an elevated position (a feature shared with the nearby Scuola Grande Tedesca and Scuola Italiana) in accordance with Talmudic precepts about synagogue architecture; (Note: "The house that is devoted to God needs to be elevated above the other houses of the city" (Shabbat 11a).) on a more practical note, the parcel where the building sits was owned by a prominent Venetian patrician family, (Note: The lot of the Scuola Canton belonged to the Erizzo family; similarly, the Scuola Grande Tedesca and the Scuola Italiana were built on parcels owned by two wealthy patrician families.) but the raised placement put the synagogue under the direct control of the Jewish community.

The first floor entrance to the synagogue building consists of a spacious and luminous lobby divided by two white tuscan columns; a stairway, lined with nineteenth-century plaques commemorating prominent members of the community, connects it to the third story synagogue. The current look of both the hall and the stairway is the result of a restoration carried out in the late 1850s. On the third floor, the synagogue is accessed through a narrow vestibule lined with benches; four windows placed on the vestibule's west wall (bricked up in 1847, and reopened in 1980) overlook the main room. The original function of such space — reminiscent of the anteroom (polish in Yiddish) often found in Central European synagogue buildings — is not clear; however, its layout suggests that it may have initially served as a matroneum. A new raised women's gallery was completed in 1736: from that moment on, and until 1847, the antechamber is thought to have been used by people unable to afford a seat in the main room. Due to the synagogue's modest dimensions, the number of places was in fact limited: owning a seat was considered a status symbol, and seats were often handed down through generations within prominent families.

=== Interior ===
The synagogue benefits of plenty of natural light thanks to the eleven large windows opening to the outside. The interior, heavily altered by the eighteenth-century interventions, is decorated in the Baroque style with some Rococo elements. The main focal points, the bimah and the ark, are placed at the opposite ends of the sanctuary: this was indeed the first Venetian synagogue to be built with the "bifocal effect", as the pulpit of the Scuola Grande Tedesca, later relocated, was originally placed in the middle of the room in accordance with the traditional "central bimah" configuration.

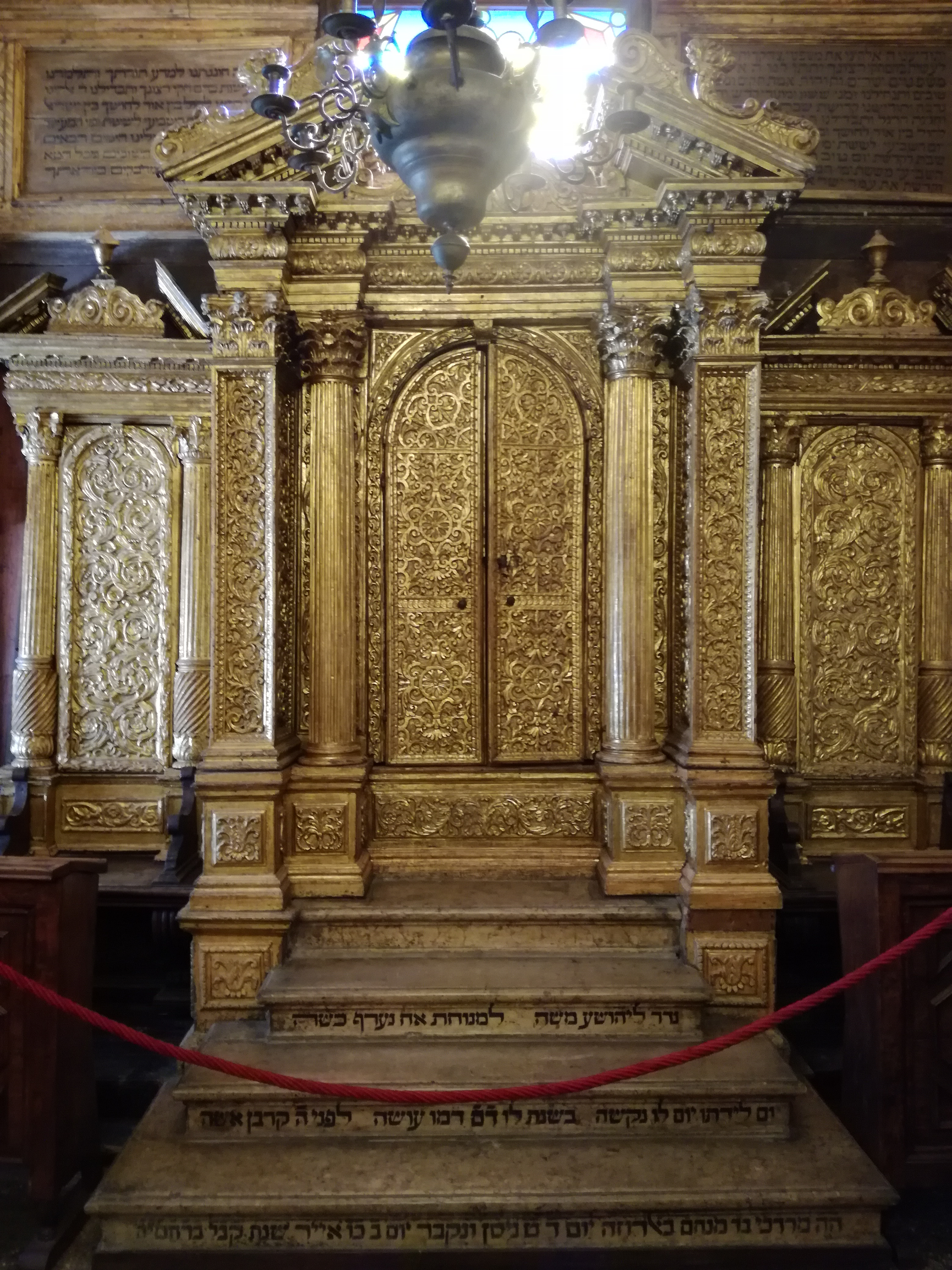
The ark

The intricately decorated ark is entirely gilded, as prescribed in the Book of Exodus with regard to the Ark of the Covenant; (Note: "And thou shalt overlay it with pure gold, within and without shalt thou overlay it, and shalt make upon it a crown of gold round about" (Exodus 25:11); "And he overlaid it with pure gold within and without, and made a crown of gold to it round about" (Exodus 37:2).) such abundance of gilt also reflects what was the decorative style in fashion in late seventeenth-century Venice. The ark occupies a deep niche in the southern wall facing Jerusalem, as typically seen in ancient synagogues. The niche protrudes outwards and is thus visible from the outside; this feature, characteristic of Venetian domestic architecture and once commonly seen in buildings throughout the city, is called liagò (or diagò) and probably derived from Islamic architecture. Above the ark, a small stained glass window with blue, yellow, red, and green accents provides additional light. The ark has a tripartite structure: the central section hosts the niche for the Torah scrolls, surmounted by a baroque broken pediment and flanked by two square pillars and two fluted Corinthian columns; the two lateral sections feature the seats for the parnassim with ornated curved backs, crowned by smaller broken pediments and enclosed on each side by Corinthian columns with oblique and vertical fluting. The marble steps leading to the closet feature an obscure inscriptions in Hebrew, which reads:

The gift of Joshua Moshe in memory of his brother who was slaughtered like a goat. The day of his birth was a difficult day for him. On his 44th birthday his blood may be offered as a sacrifice to God. Mordechai, son of Menachem Baldosa, 1672.

The date mentioned in the inscription indicates "with great approximation" that of the construction of the ark; as previously noted, its decorative style is clearly reminiscent of that period. Above the parnassim seats are two wooden panels with texts from two Sabbath prayers.

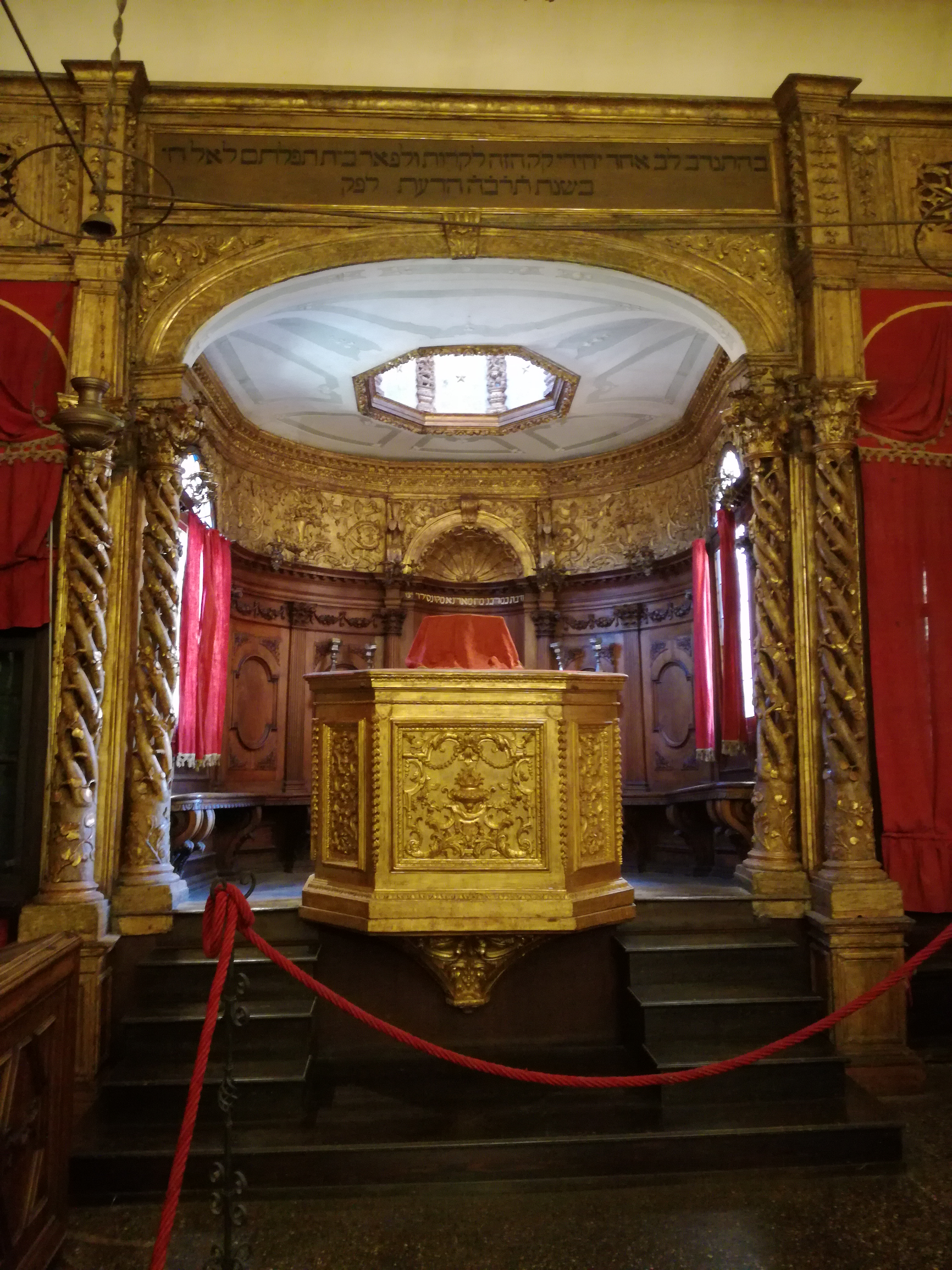
The bimah

At the opposite end of the room is the bimah, which dates back to c. 1780. The raised polygonal pulpit, reached through five wooden steps and delicately decorated in the Rococo style, is surmounted by a semi-elliptical arch supported by four original columns of interlacing branches, reminiscent of the two pillars on the porch of Solomon's Temple. The columns, of exquisite workmanship, were carefully restored in the 1980s. The pulpit stands inside a semi-hexagonal niche, illuminated from above by a dome-shaped skylight, which was built around 1730. The wooden seats surrounding the pulpit were originally reserved for the most eminent members of the community. The eighteenth-century rearrangement of this section of the synagogue was most assuredly carried out by local Christian architect Bartolomeo Scalfurotto, who in the same period (around 1731) was working on the refurbishment of the façade of the Doge's Palace.

Placed against the room's longer walls are two walnut benches whose decoration was completed in 1789, together with the gilding of the synagogue's interior. All the walls are subdivided into five horizontal sections; the number five recurs repeatedly throughout the synagogue (five are the openings on the two longer walls, as well as the steps leading to the bimah) as an evidence of its importance in Judaism. (Note: Five are the books of the Torah, and the sections of the book of Psalms.)

Two of the four walls are noteworthy for the presence of eight wooden panels with relief medallions depicting biblical episodes from the Book of Exodus, including the city of Jericho, the Crossing of the Red Sea, the Altar of Sacrifice, the Manna, the Ark on the banks of the Jordan River, Korah, the gift of the Torah, and Moses making water flow from the rock. The eight medallions, painted in tempera, are of no particular artistic merit, but do stand out for their rarity: landscape paintings are indeed an extremely uncommon feature in synagogues, and their presence in the Canton Synagogue may reflect the influence of Central European models. The medallions are in fact reminiscent of oval cartouches displayed on the frontispieces of Jewish books printed in Kraków in the late sixteenth century.

== Gallery ==
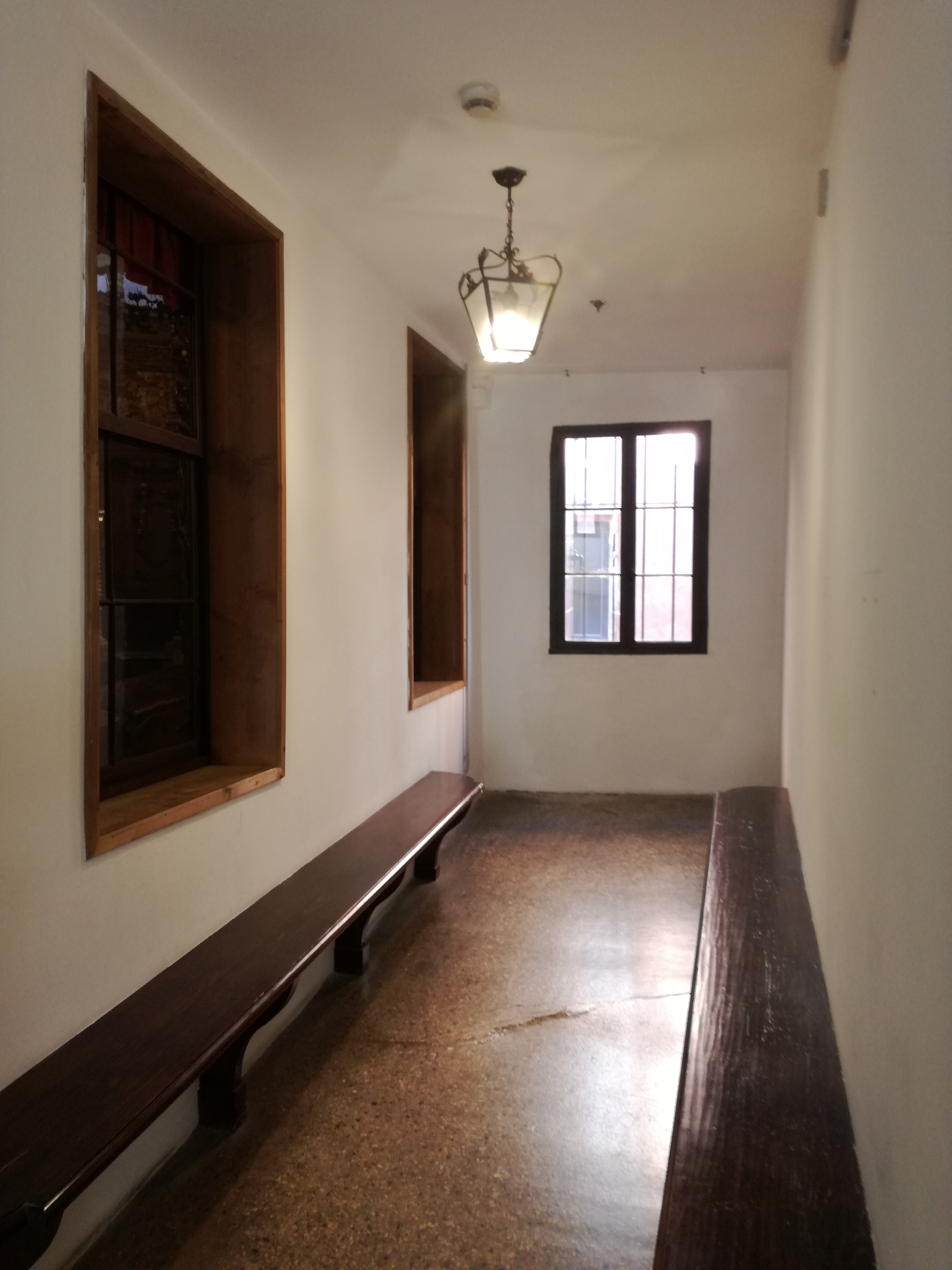
Picture of the vestibule, looking north. The windows on the left overlook the main room

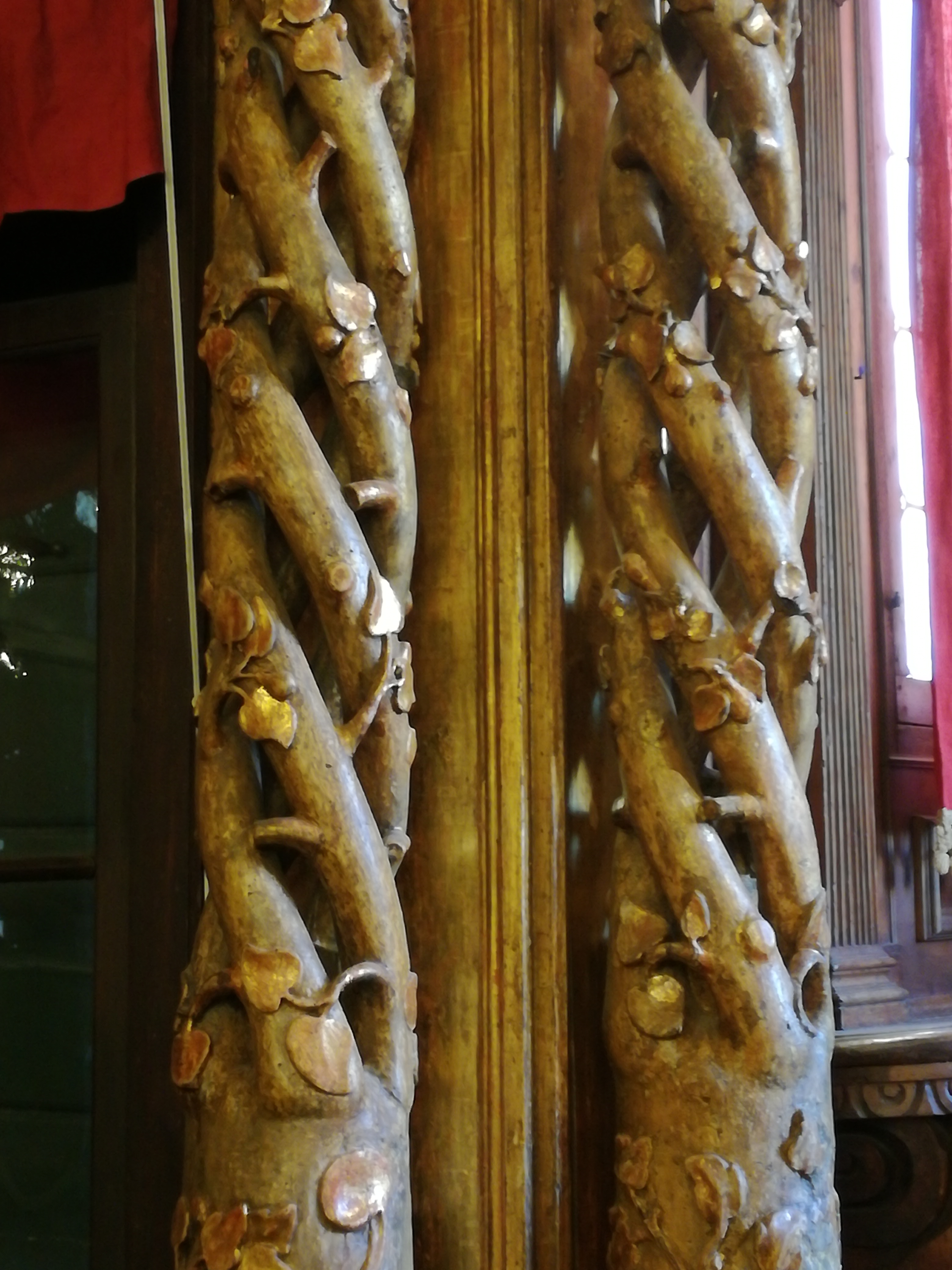
Detail of the carved columns

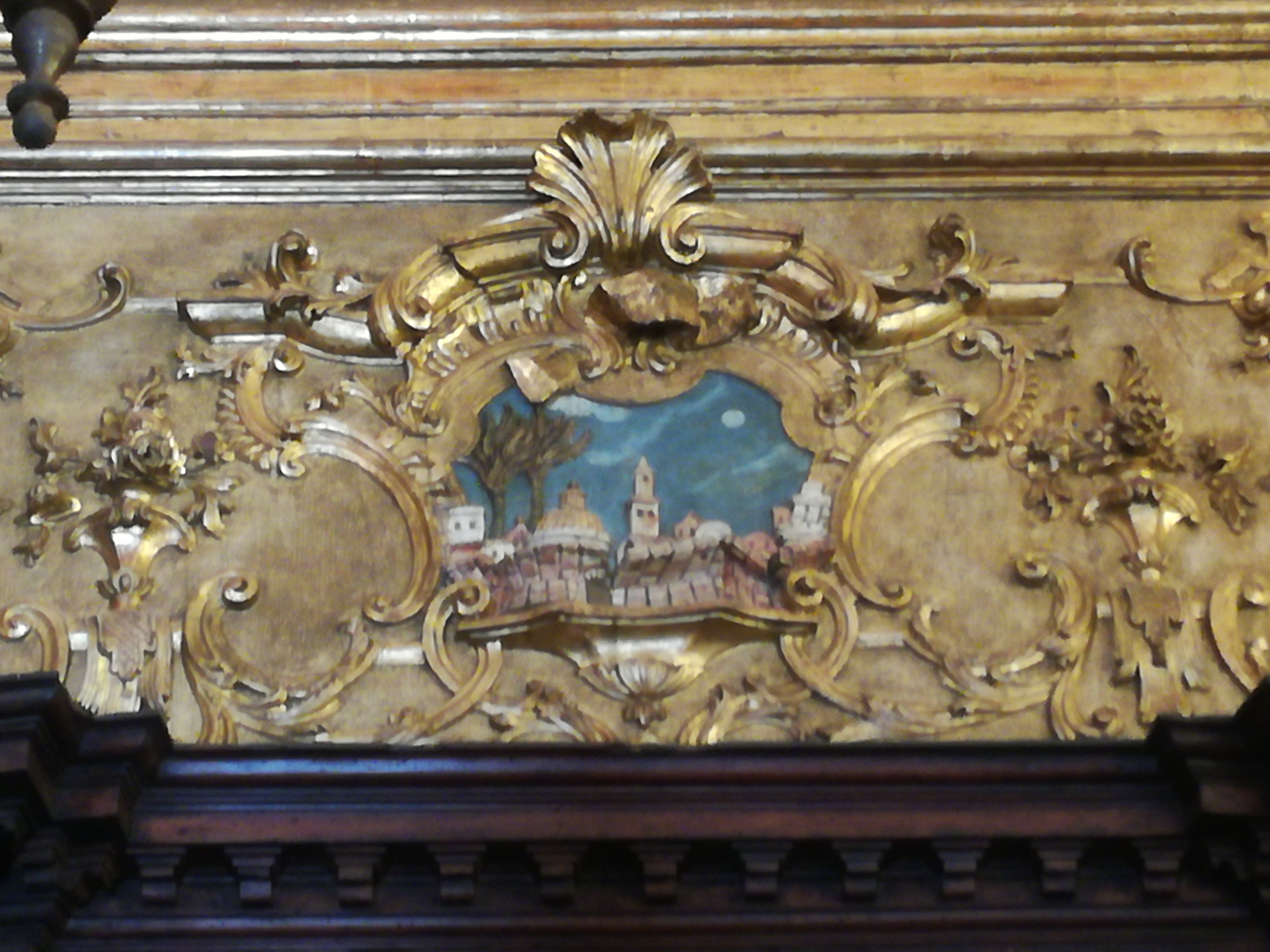
Detail of one of the relief medallions, depicting the city of Jericho and its crumbling walls

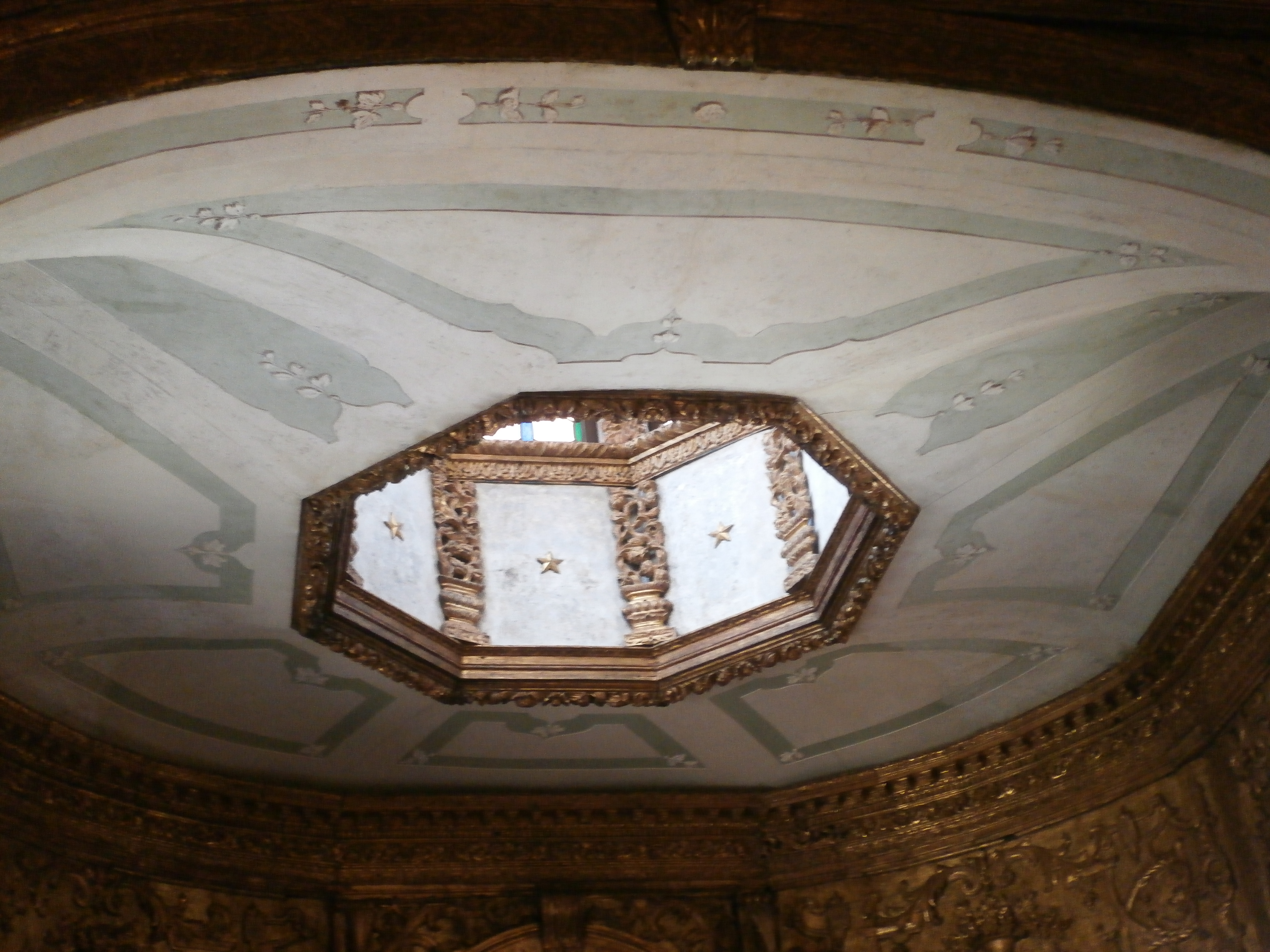
Interior view of the skylight

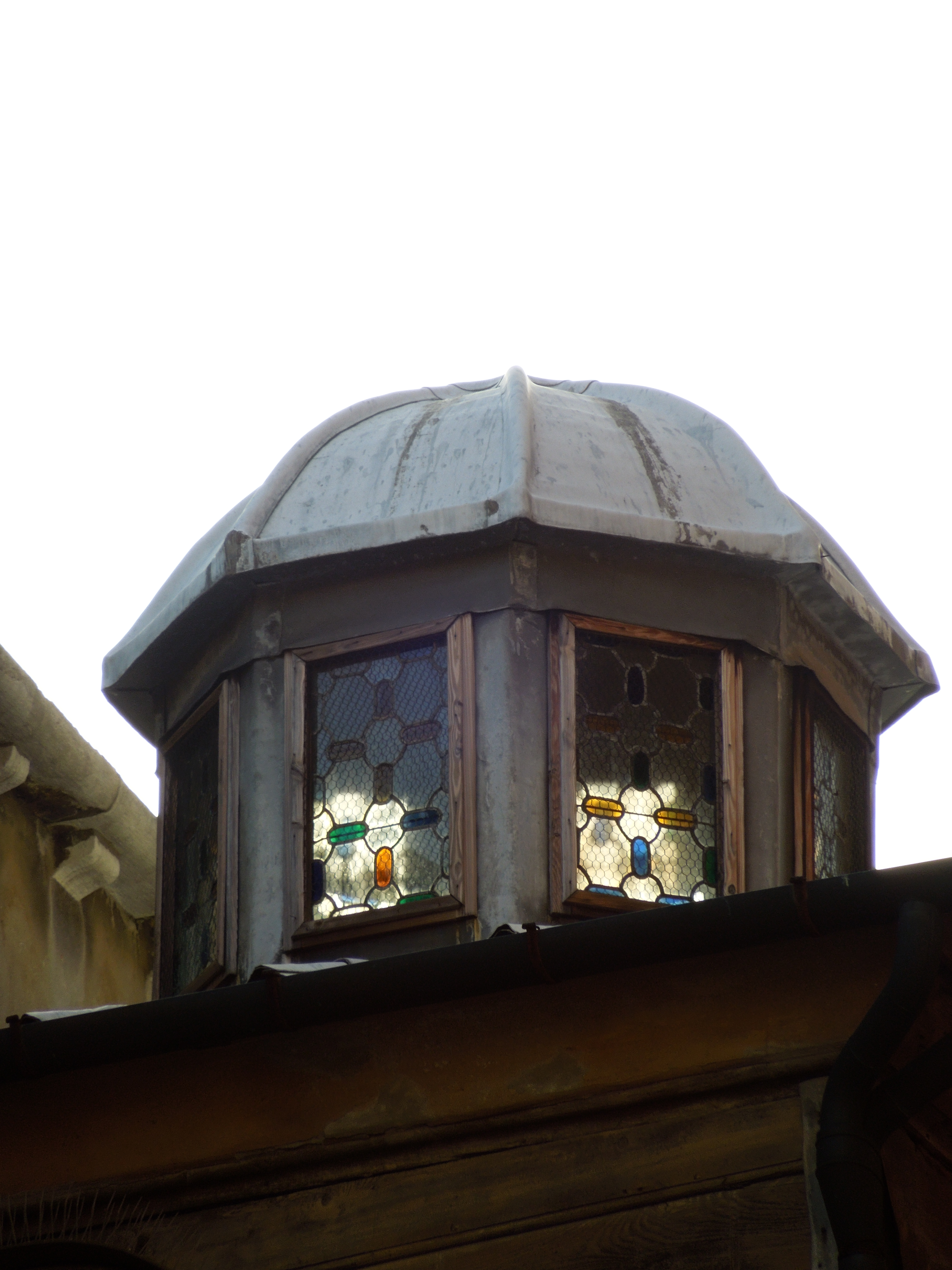
Detail of the domed skylight

== See also ==
- History of the Jews in Venice
- List of synagogues in Italy
