= Giammaria Mazzucchelli =

Italian writer, bibliographer and historian

Giammaria Mazzuchelli
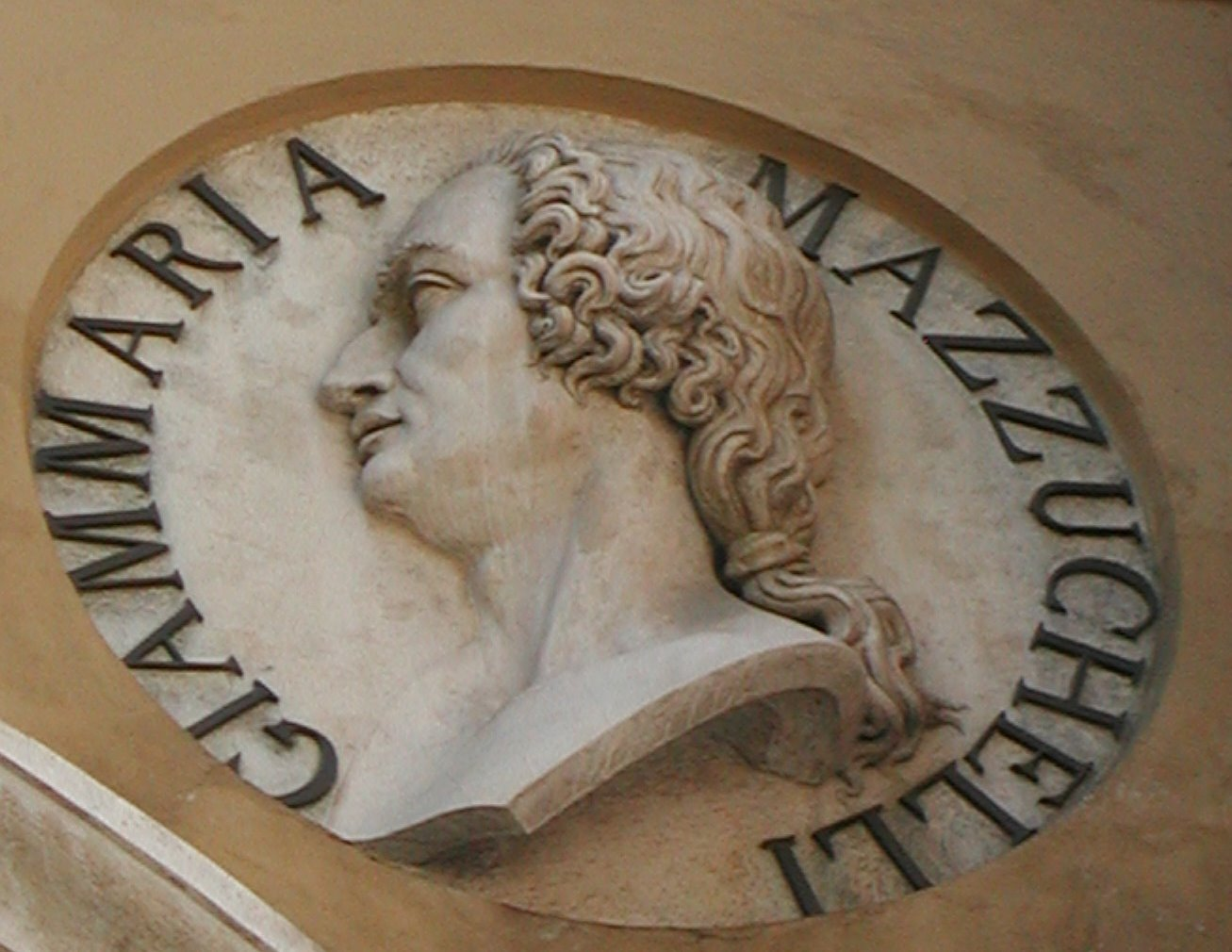
- Portrait of Giammaria Mazzuchelli in Brescia
- Born: 28 October 1707; Brescia, Republic of Venice
- Died: 19 November 1765 (aged 58); Brescia, Republic of Venice
- Occupations: Writer, bibliographer and literary historian
- Writing career
- Language: Italian
- Notable works: Gli scrittori d'Italia, cioè, Notizie storiche e critiche intorno alle vite e agli scritti dei letterati italiani (1753-1763)

Count Giammaria Mazzuchelli (or Giovanni Maria Mazzucchelli) (28 October 1707 – 19 November 1765) was an Italian writer, bibliographer and literary historian.

== Biography ==
Mazzuchelli was the son of Count Federico Mazzuchelli (it., Brescia, 1671–1746) and Margaret Muzzi. Due to poor health during early childhood, he studied at first with a private tutor. He continued his studies in Bologna, where he studied under Francesco Saverio Quadrio, and later in Padua, where he studied under Domenico Lazzarini, where he graduated in 1728. In the same year, he married Barbara Chizzoli, an heiress whose dowry allowed him to devote himself to literary-historical studies. Mazzucchelli's father bought the Moggi's sixteenth-century family house, located between Brescia and Lake Garda, in 1722, and added the central building and the west wing some time later. Giammaria completed the construction in 1753, as stated on the memorial tablet set between the pronaos' central door architrave and the tympanum.

== Works ==
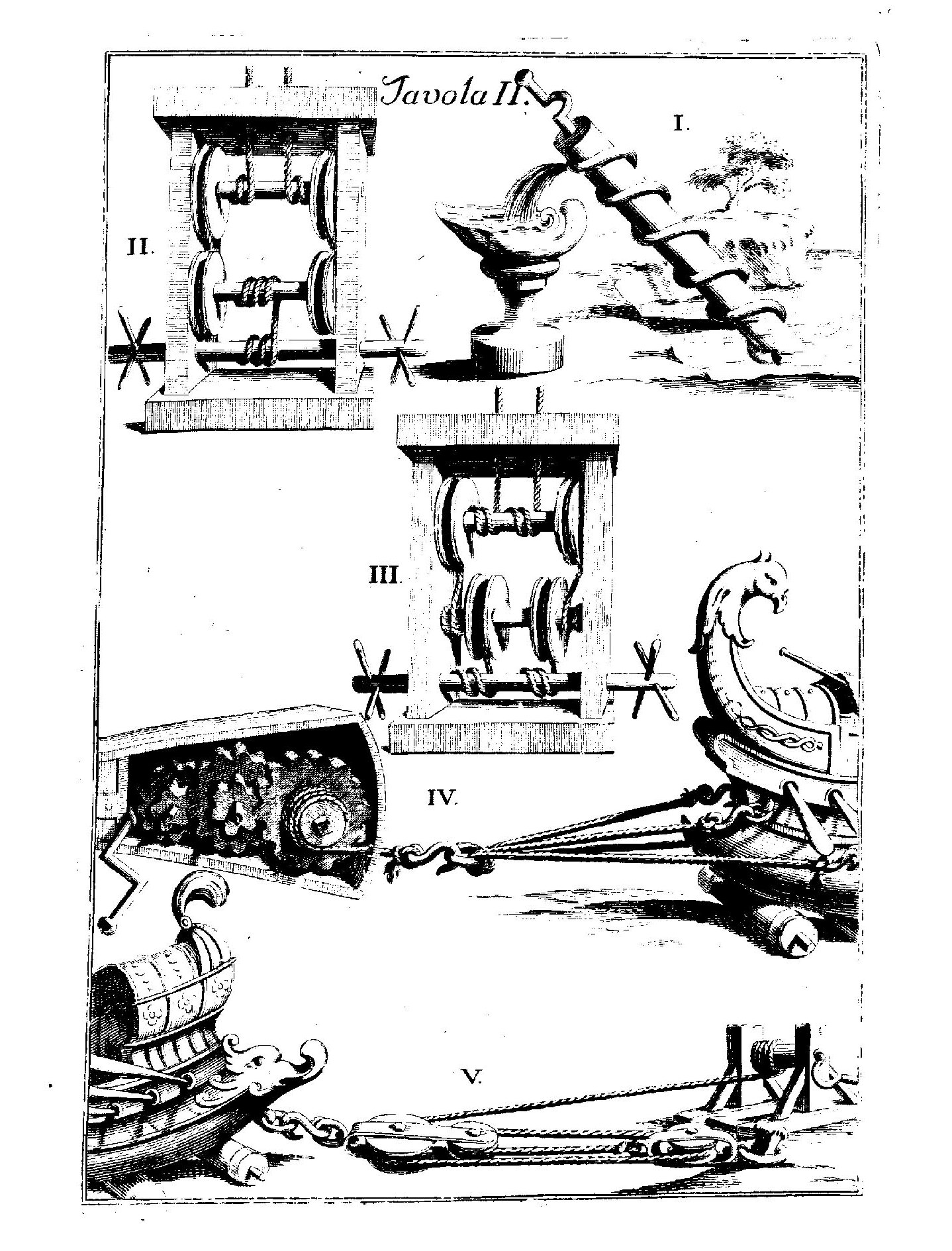
Notizie istoriche e critiche intorno alla vita, alle invenzioni, ed agli scritti di Archimede siracusano (1737)

He began with numerous scholarly and accurate biographies of ancient and more modern authors, e.g., Archimedes, Pietro Aretino, Lodovico Adimari, Luigi Alamanni, Matteo and Filippo Villani). From this experience, he conceived an ambitious plan to collect biographies of all the writers of Italy from the earliest times, including the history of their works. In this endeavor, he relied on the Queriniana library in Brescia, donated by the Cardinal Angelo Maria Quirini, and his extensive correspondence with the scholars of Italy and Europe. He began to compile a dictionary of great writers of Italy, but the work remained unfinished because of his untimely death. However, Mazzuchelli opened the way to the history of Italian literature, recognized by Girolamo Tiraboschi in the Introduction of his greatest work, and subsequent historians. Much of Mazzuchelli's unpublished material is still in manuscript form in the Vatican Library. A copy is also in the collection of the Biblioteca Nazionale Centrale di Roma.

== Sources ==
- "Mazzuchelli (Count Giovanni Maria)." In: Louis-Maïeul Chaudon, Nouvelle Dictionnaire Historique, Michele Morelli, 1791. Volume XVII, pp. 407–410 (Google Books)
- Lasagna, Paola (2008). "MAZZUCHELLI, Gian Maria". Dizionario Biografico degli Italiani (in Italian). Vol. 72. Rome: Istituto dell'Enciclopedia Italiana.
