= Palazzo Savorgnan =

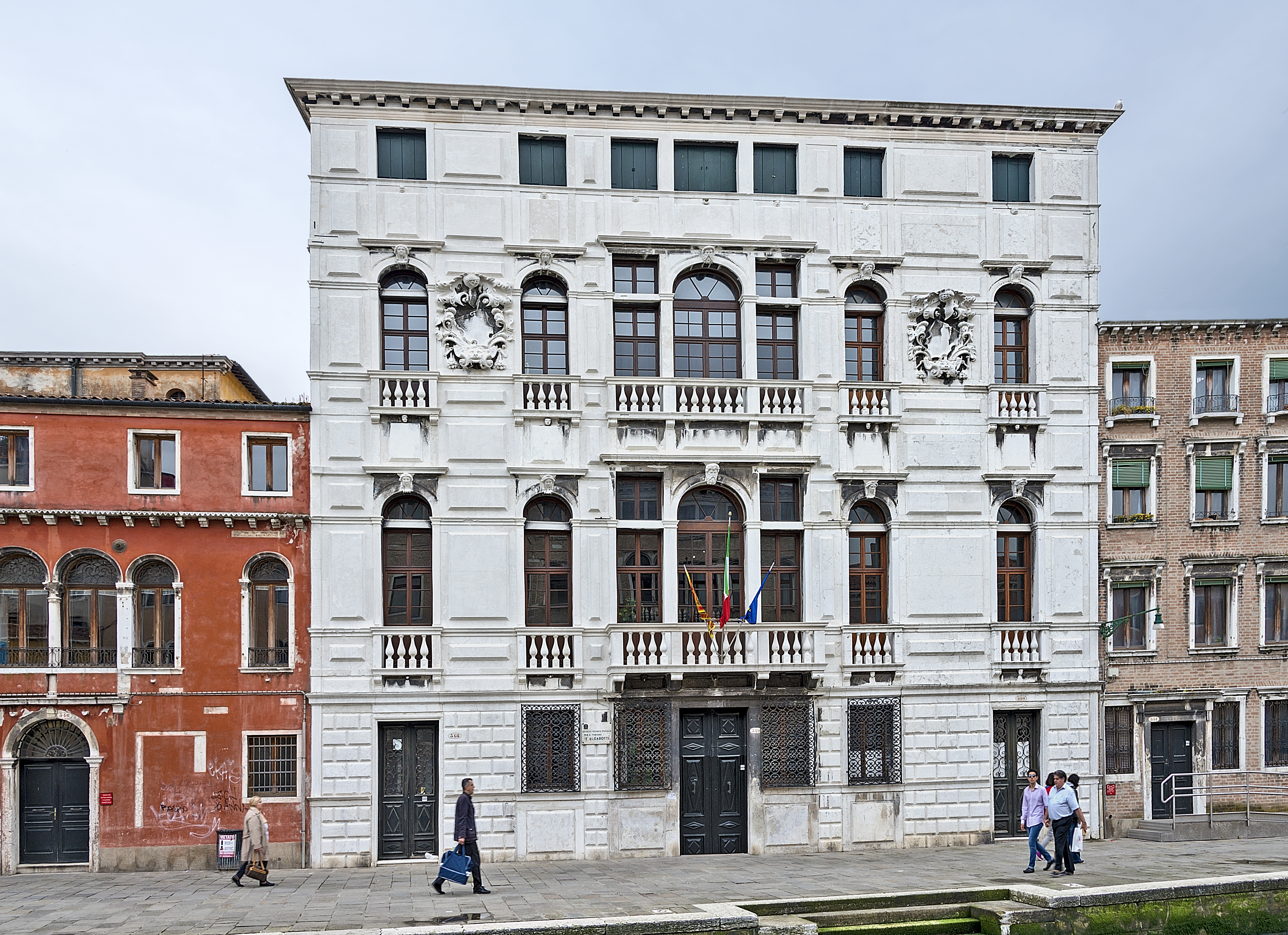
- Palazzo Savorgnan
- Interactive map of the Palazzo Savorgnan area

General information
- Type: Residential
- Architectural style: Baroque
- Location: Cannaregio district, Venice, Italy
- Coordinates: 45°26′38.76″N 12°19′26.76″E
- Construction stopped: 17th century

Technical details
- Floor count: 4 levels

Design and construction
- Architect: Giuseppe Sardi

Palazzo Savorgnan is a palace in Venice, Italy, located in the Cannaregio district and overlooking Canale di Cannaregio, to the right of Palazzo Priuli Manfrin.

== Attribution ==
Built in the 17th century for the noble Savorgnan family, the palazzo is a project by Giuseppe Sardi, a Baroque architect of the nearby Palazzo Surian Bellotto, who was inspired by works of Baldassare Longhena. However, the architectural scholar Elena Bassi admits that the palazzo might have been designed by Giuseppe Gaspari due to the similarity of the building with Ca' Zenobio degli Armeni. Later, two wings were added to the initial structure.

== History ==
In 1788, Palazzo Savorgnan was a victim of the serious fire, which damaged many parts, including the enormous eighteenth-century dormer and started a degradation process that lasted at least until the purchase of the structure by the Galvagna family in 1826. This family preserved a vast art gallery, with works of Palma il Vecchio and other great Venetian artists. The collection, however, was dispersed in 1855, following an auction. Today, many works from the Galvagna collection are kept at the National Gallery in London.

In the early 20th century, the palazzo was transformed into a college for girls. Currently in good condition, it hosts the technical school for tourism "Francesco Algarotti".

== Architecture ==
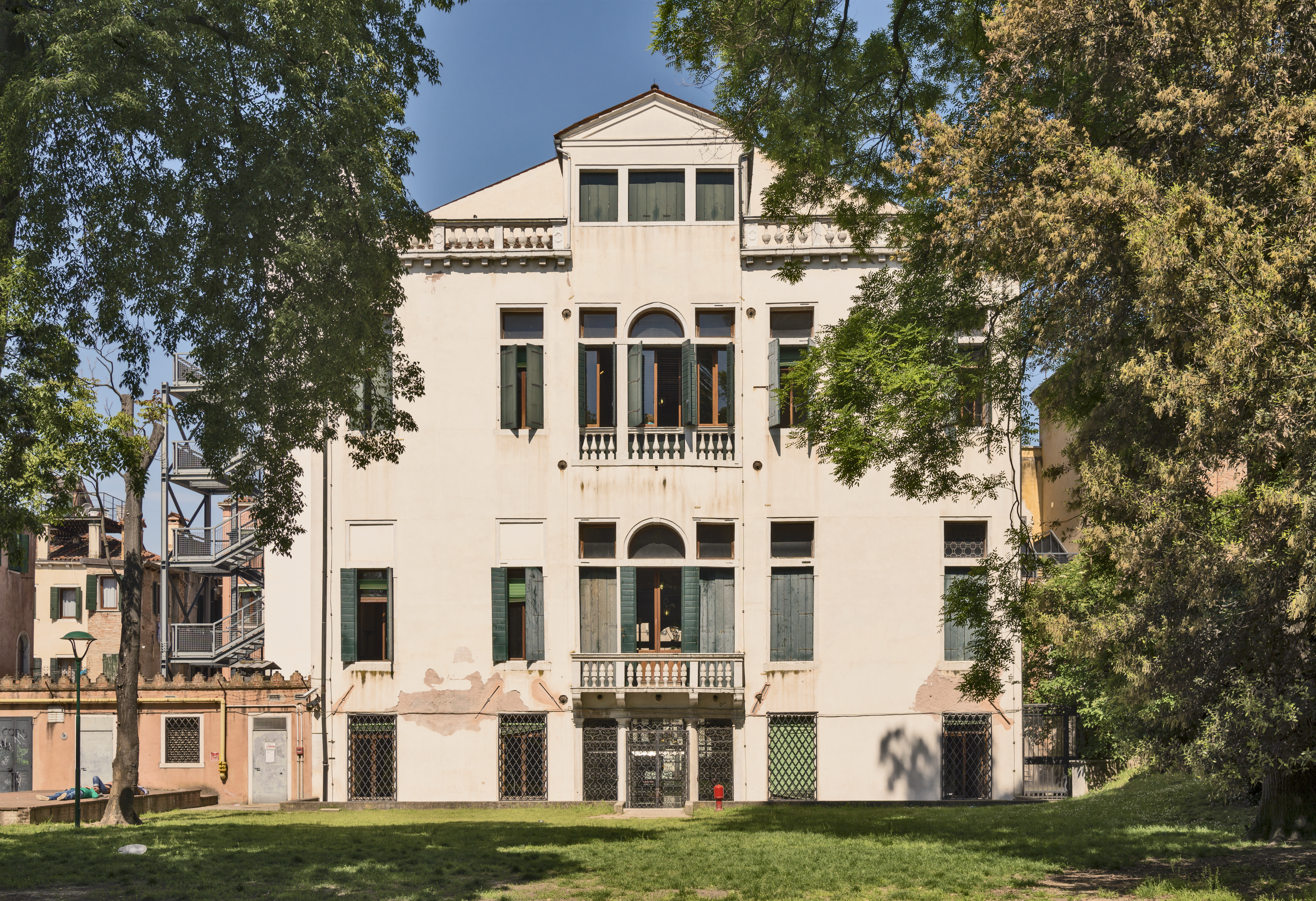
Rear façade of the palazzo

The façade is arranged in four levels underlined by the string courses. A simple rectangular portal is placed in the center of the ground floor covered with ashlar. The portal is flanked by single lancet windows. A large portego colonnade starts from the portal.

The two noble floors have openings decorated by stone frames with masks and balustrades; both floors have large serlianas located at the center part of the façade with a pair of arched windows on each side. The second floor also has two large coats of arms. The attic, floor is planned symmetrically with the other floors, consisting of smaller squared windows.

A recent restoration of the main façade underlined the stone and masonry details of the palazzo, revealing the modus operandi of construction workers of the part. In particular, the restoration revealed the ways in which the stone cornices and the masks were anchored—fixed not only with a joint with the wall but also with forged metal clamps in place. Other metal parts were used to fix the main beams to the mezzanine masonry, thus creating a holistic architectural ensemble.

There is a vast garden in the back of the palazzo, still well-preserved, which, together with the garden of Palazzo Priuli Manfrin, has been made a public park.
