= Girolamo Manfrin =

- Born: 1742; Zara, Republic of Venice (Now Zadar, Croatia)
- Died: 1801 (aged 58–59); Venice, Habsburg monarchy (Now Italy)
- Occupation: Entrepreneur

Girolamo Manfrin (1742 – 1801) was a Dalmatian Italian entrepreneur active in Venice in the 18th century. He was born in Zara (today Zadar, Croatia) in the Republic of Venice. His origins are unclear.

V. Spreti traced his line back to a Manfredo created count in 1433.

He appeared in Venice for the first time in the 1760s. He struggled in Venice in the beginning, ending up in jail after he refused to reveal (as it was customary) the names of the investors of the tender for conducting Venice's tobacco trade, which he had won. He spent more than a year in jail. He was later released and sent to his native Zara.

He again attempted to engage in the tobacco trade, winning a second tender. Later he became involved also in manufacturing. In 1788 he was able to buy the Palazzo Venier in Cannareggio. He had a famous art collection comprising the Portrait of Johannes Wtenbogaert by Rembrandt, today in the Rijksmuseum in Amsterdam.

== Sources ==
- Martina Frank, Girolamo Manfrin, in Dizionario biografico degli italiani, vol. 68, Roma, Istituto dell'Enciclopedia Italiana, 2007. URL consultato l'11 giugno 2013.
- Fonti e Bibl.: Arch. di Stato di Venezia, Senato, Rettori, filza 372, febbraio 1786;
- R. Tolomeo, Il commercio e il contrabbando del tobacco tra Serenissima e Levante, in Mercanti e viaggiatori per le vie del mondo, a cura di G. Motta, Milano 2000, pp. 275–288;
- V. Spreti, Enc. storico-nobiliare italiana, Appendice, II, pp. 251–253. M. Frank
