= Moggy (disambiguation) =

Moggie or moggy may refer to:

- A cat without a pedigree, for which see: moggy
- Morris Minor, a British automobile which debuted in 1948
- Morgan Motor Company automobiles
- Moggy Township, Ontario, Canada, wherein lies the source of Percy Creek (Sudbury District)

== People ==
=== Given name ===
- Leo Moggie (born 1941), Malaysian politician

=== Nickname ===
- Maurice Hutton (1903–1940), Australian rules footballer
- Harold Palin (1916–1990), English rugby league footballer
- Gary Colling (born 1950), Australian rules footballer
- Jacob Rees-Mogg (born 1969), British politician
- Eoin Morgan (born 1986), Irish-born cricketer

== See also ==
- Mog (disambiguation)
- Moggi, an Italian surname
- Moggy Hollow Natural Area, a nature preserve in New Jersey, United States
