= Giovanni Battista Mengardi =

Italian painter

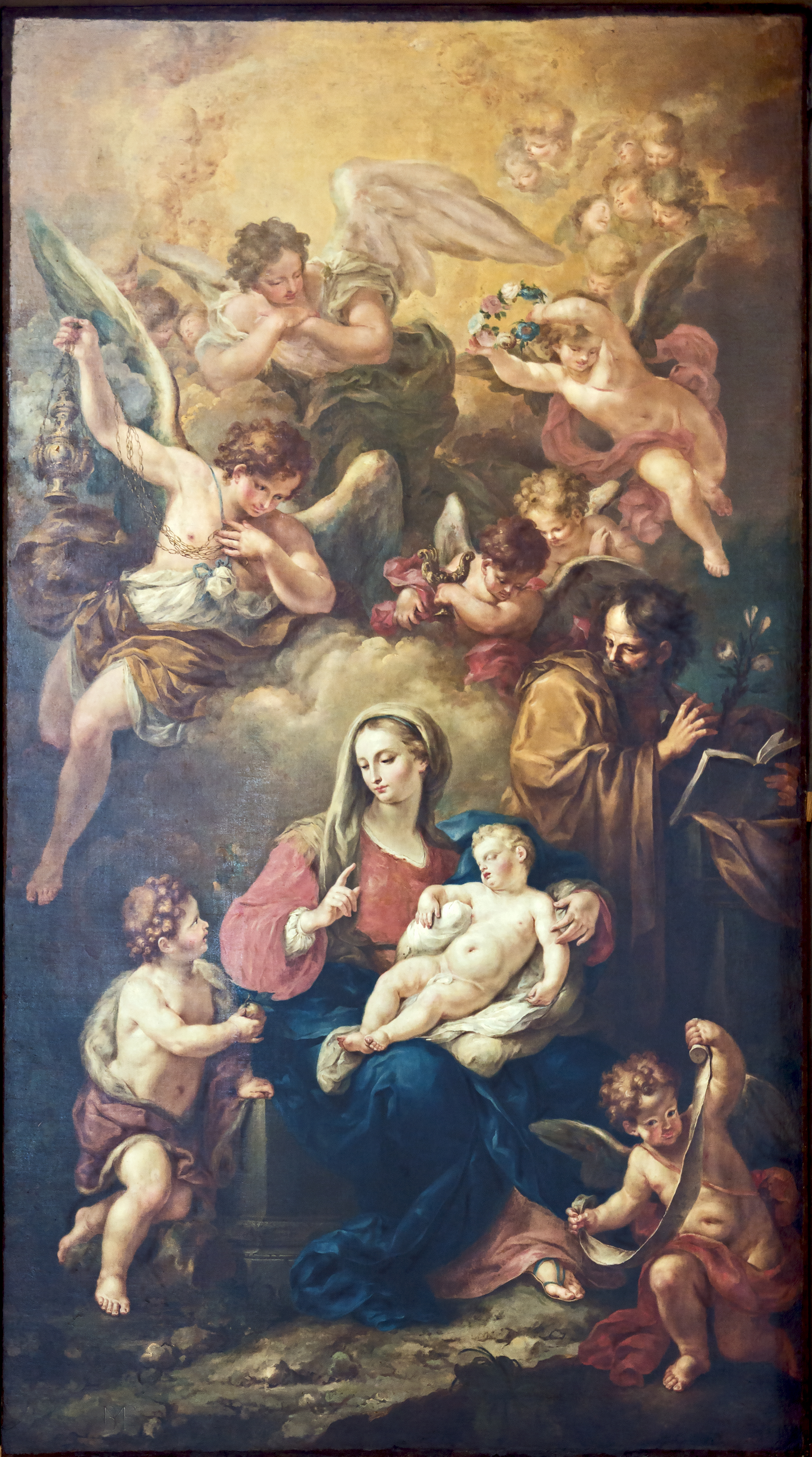
The Holy Family, San Geremia

Giovanni Battista Mengardi, or Giambattista Mengardi (7 October 1738, in Padua – 28 August 1796, in Venice) was an Italian painter and art restorer.

== Life and work ==
He had his first art lessons in Padua; continuing in Venice, where he was able to study with Giambattista Tiepolo, who had just returned from Würzburg. He then became a member of the "Brotherhood of Painters", in Padua, where he created his first major work; decorations in the Episcopal chapel, to mark the beatification of Cardinal Gregorio Barbarigo (1761). They have since been lost. He would remain in Padua until 1767. That year, after painting some frescoes at the Palazzo Maldura, he left to live in Venice, where he enrolled at the Academy of Fine Arts.

His initial project there involved paintings for the Chiesa di San Pietro Apostolo in Campagna Lupia. In the 1770s, he created an altarpiece, depicting the Holy Family, for the sanctuary at San Geremia.

He became a professor at the academy in 1776. Two years later, he was appointed an inspector for the Council of Ten, succeeding the late Antonio Maria Zanetti, and was charged with maintaining a census of pictorial works on public display. The following year, his duties were divided, with Pietro Edwards being put in charge of general restoration. These responsibilities had the predictable effect of reducing his artistic output.

In 1787, he decorated the ceilings in four rooms at the Palazzo Priuli in Cannaregio with mythological subjects, including Athena contending with Poseidon over the possession of Attica. At Sant'Andrea, Padua church, he painted the ceiling with the Apotheosis of St Andrew. His last major commissions were executed between 1792 and 1793: a fresco for the ceiling at the Palazzo Barbarigo della Terrazza, depicting Vulcan delivering the sword of Aeneas to Venus, and a grisaille fresco in simulated relief, at the Palazzo Bellavite Baffo.

== Sources ==
- Rodolfo Pallucchini (1960). La pittura veneziana del Settecento. Venezia-Roma: Istituto per la collaborazione culturale.
- "Giambattista Mengardi" from the Dizionario Biografico degli Italiani @ Treccani
