= Domenico Lazzarini =

Italian prelate, academic, classicist, playwright and poet

Reverend Domenico Lazzarini
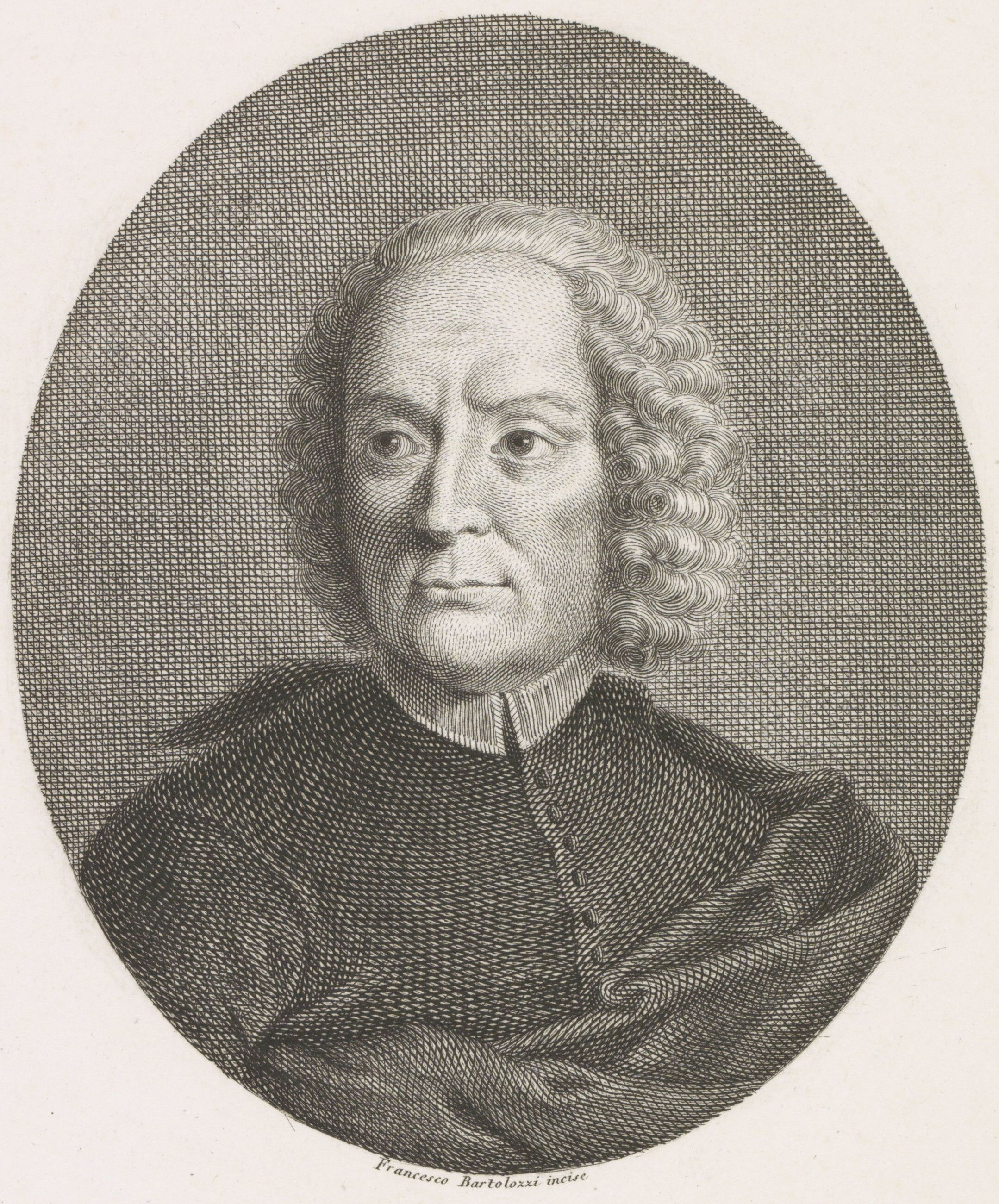
- Domenico Lazzarini, in a lithograph by Francesco Bartolozzi.
- Born: August 18, 1668; Morrovalle, Papal States
- Died: 12 July 1734 (aged 65); Padua, Republic of Venice
- Burial place: Sant'Andrea, Padua
- Other names: Felicio Orcomeniano; Francesco Bagnario
- Occupations: Catholic priest, translator, university teacher, playwright, poet
- Title: abbot
- Parent(s): Francesco Maria Lazzarini and Lodovica Lazzarini (née Gasparrini)

Academic background
- Education: University of Macerata
- Influences: Sophocles; Aristotle; Augustine of Hippo

Academic work
- Discipline: Classicist
- Institutions: University of Macerata; University of Padua
- Doctoral students: Giammaria Mazzucchelli

Domenico Lazzarini (18 August 1668 – 12 July 1734) was an Italian prelate, academic, classicist, playwright and poet, working mainly in Padua.

== Biography ==
He was born in Morrovalle near Macerata. He studied at the Jesuit College in Macerata, graduating in 1687 with a doctorate in philosophy, theology, and jurisprudence in utroque iure At this young age, he was admitted to the Accademia dei Catenati of Macerata. He was admired for his erudition in both Latin and Greek, and in 1690 appointed to a professorship in Macerata. In 1703, he was elected Auditore della Rota in Macerata. He found some detractors in his native town, and found refuge in Bologna under the protection of Cardinal Lorenzo Casoni (1645–1720), legate to Bologna. In 1711, the Venetian Senate recruited him to teach Greek and Latin at the University of Padua. In 1712, he had been inducted a member of the Accademia dei Ricovrati of Padua. He taught in Padua as professor for 23 years until his death.

His main work is the neoclassical tragedy Ulisse il Giovane.

== Works ==
- Ulisse il giovane, tragedia. Padua. 1720; Milan. 1825.
- La Sanese, commedia. Venice: al Segno della salamandra. 1734.
- Poesie del signor abate Domenico Lazzarini. Venice: Hertz e Bassaglia. 1736.
- L'Elettra di Sofocle, Bologna, 1737.
- Osservazioni sopra la Merope del Maffei. Rome: Niccolò e Marco Pagliarini. 1743.
- Tre lettere nelle quali si prova che Verona appartenne ai Cenomani. Brescia: Gian-Maria Rizzardi. 1745.
- Note ed osservazioni al Lucrezio Caro di Alessandro Marchetti, Londra (Venice), 1764, 2 vols.

== Bibliography ==
- Grimaldi, Antonio (2005). "Lazzarini, Domenico". Dizionario Biografico degli Italiani (in Italian). Vol. 64: Latilla–Levi Montalcini. Rome: Istituto dell'Enciclopedia Italiana. ISBN 978-88-12-00032-6.
