= Palazzo Priuli Manfrin =

Historic palace in Venice, Italy

Coordinates: 45°26′38″N 12°19′29″E

The Palazzo Manfrin Venier, once known as the Palazzo Priuli a Cannaregio or Palazzo Priuli Manfrin, is a Baroque-style palace located facing the Cannaregio Canal in the sestiere of Cannaregio of Venice, Italy. It stands to the left of the Palazzo Savorgnan.

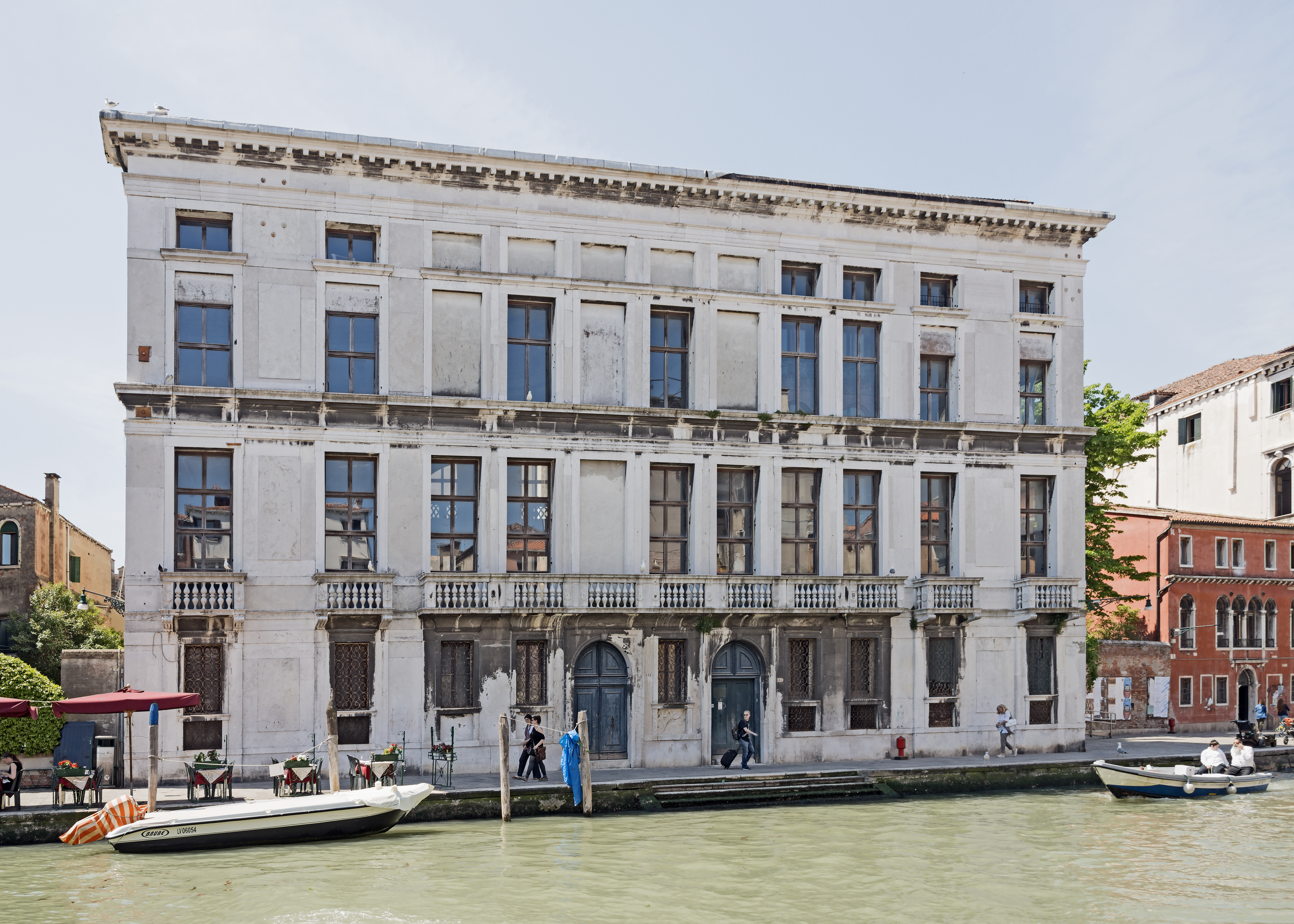
Facade on Cannaregio Canal

== History ==
The heraldic symbols of the Priuli family on the walls of the palace, dating to 1520, indicated the Priuli were the original owners of the palace, likely Angelo Maria Priuli and his son Pietro (1484–1550). Pietro was a Savio for the sestiere of Cannaregio, which was a magistracy. Through his 1517 marriage to Andriana Venier, he inherited the castle of Sanguinetto, near Verona.

During the second decade of the 18th century, reconstruction was pursued using designs by Andrea Tirali. The palace was inherited by Giovanni and Pietro Venier, sons of Federico Venier and Elena Priuli, the daughter of an Angelo Maria Priuli, descendant of the original owner.

In 1787, the Venier sold the palace to Count Girolamo Manfrin of Zara, a rich tobacco merchant who also owned another palace in San Artemio. Manfrin performed some modifications of the facade into a Neoclassical style with a central balustrade. He also had the palace decorated by Giovanni Battista Mengardi, Giuseppe Zais, and the ornamental painter David Rossi. Girolamo Manfrin became a prominent collector of books, art and natural objects. After he died in 1802, the palace was ultimately inherited by his daughter, wife of Giovanni Battista Plattis.

The adjacent gardens were aggregated to those of the Palazzo Savorgnan, to create a green public park. At some point, the palace housed a school before falling in a state of disrepair until artist Anish Kapoor bought it and renovated in the early 2020s with a view to house his foundation
