= Mog =

Mog may refer to:

== Entertainment ==
=== Characters ===
- Mog (Final Fantasy VI), in the game
- Mog (Judith Kerr), a cat in Kerr's children's books
- Mog, a half-man/half-dog in the film Spaceballs
- A cat in the Meg and Mog children's books by Helen Nicoll
- Invaders from Mogadore in the book series Lorien Legacies by Pittacus Lore
- Gremlins Mogwai (Animals in Gremlins Movie)

=== Other ===
- MOG (online music), an online music website
- Mog (TV series), UK
- Multiplayer online game

== People ==
- Mog (Abenaki leader) (1663-1724)
- Mog, Palatine of Hungary (died after 1210)
- MOG Music, Ghanaian contemporary gospel singer
- Jackson Land, Famous New Zealand Model

== Places ==
- Monghsat Airport (IATA code: MOG), Monghsat, Burma
- Moorgate railway station, London, UK, National Rail code

== Science and mathematics ==
- Miracle Octad Generator, a mathematical tool
- Modified gravity theory
- Myelin oligodendrocyte glycoprotein, a glycoprotein
  - MOG antibody disease, an inflammatory demyelinating disease of the central nervous system

== Other uses ==
- MOG (wine), material other than grapes
- Mog people, an Arakanese population in Tripura, India
  - Mog language
- Moog Inc. (NYSE: MOG.A and MOG.B)
- Machinery of government
- Might refer to how better a person looks in comparison to others

== See also ==
- Mogmog (Mwagmwog), an island in the Ulithi atoll, Caroline Islands
- Moggie (disambiguation)
