= Portrait of Johannes Wtenbogaert =

1633 painting by Rembrandt

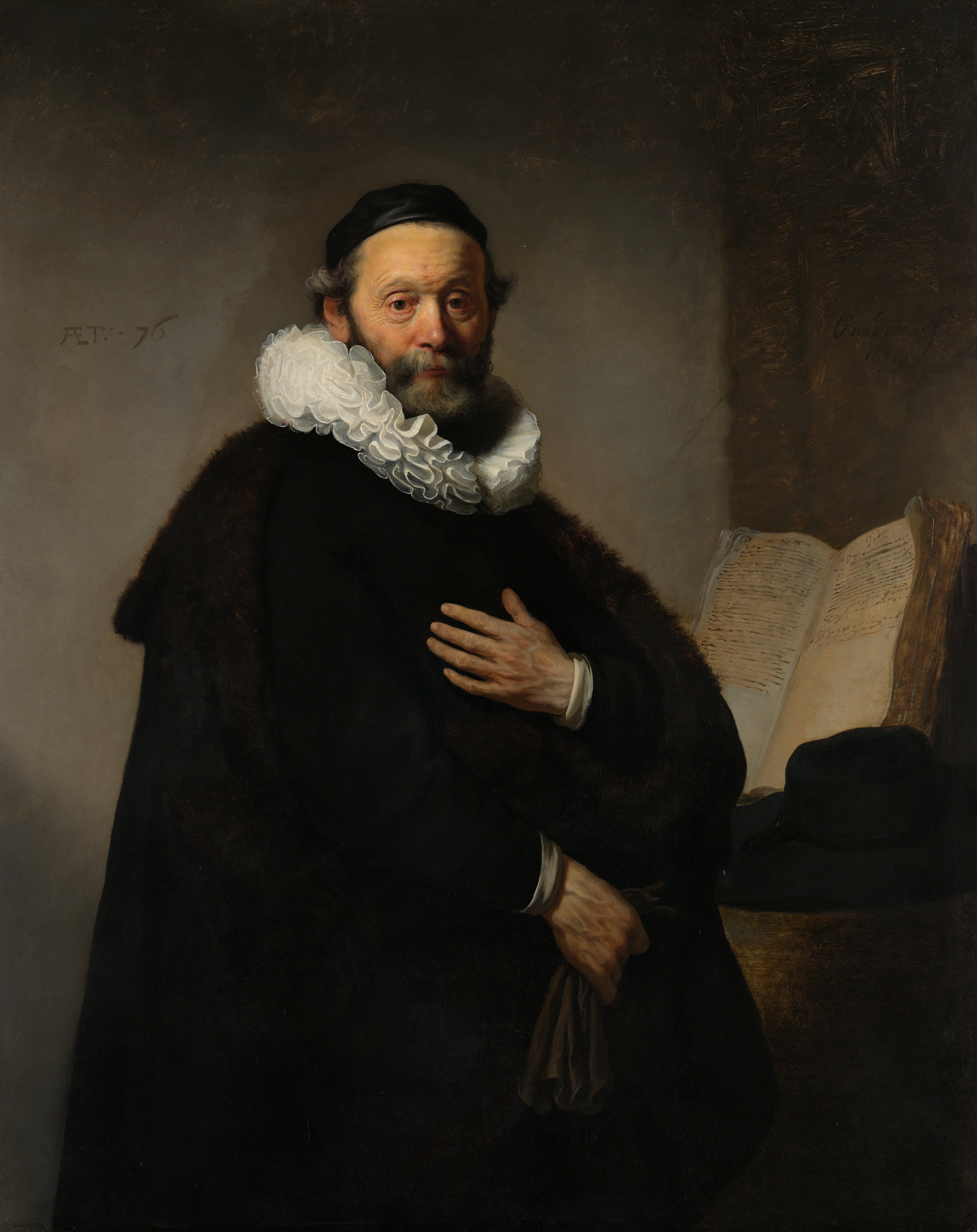

Portrait of Johannes Wtenbogaert is a 1633 oil on canvas portrait by Rembrandt of the Remonstrant preacher and writer Johannes Wtenbogaert, now in the Rijksmuseum.

== Sources ==
- http://hdl.handle.net/10934/RM0001.COLLECT.50214
- https://www.verenigingrembrandt.nl/nl/kunst/portret-van-johannes-wtenbogaert-1557-1644-remonstrants-predikant-op-76-jarige-leeftijd
