= Palazzo Maldura =

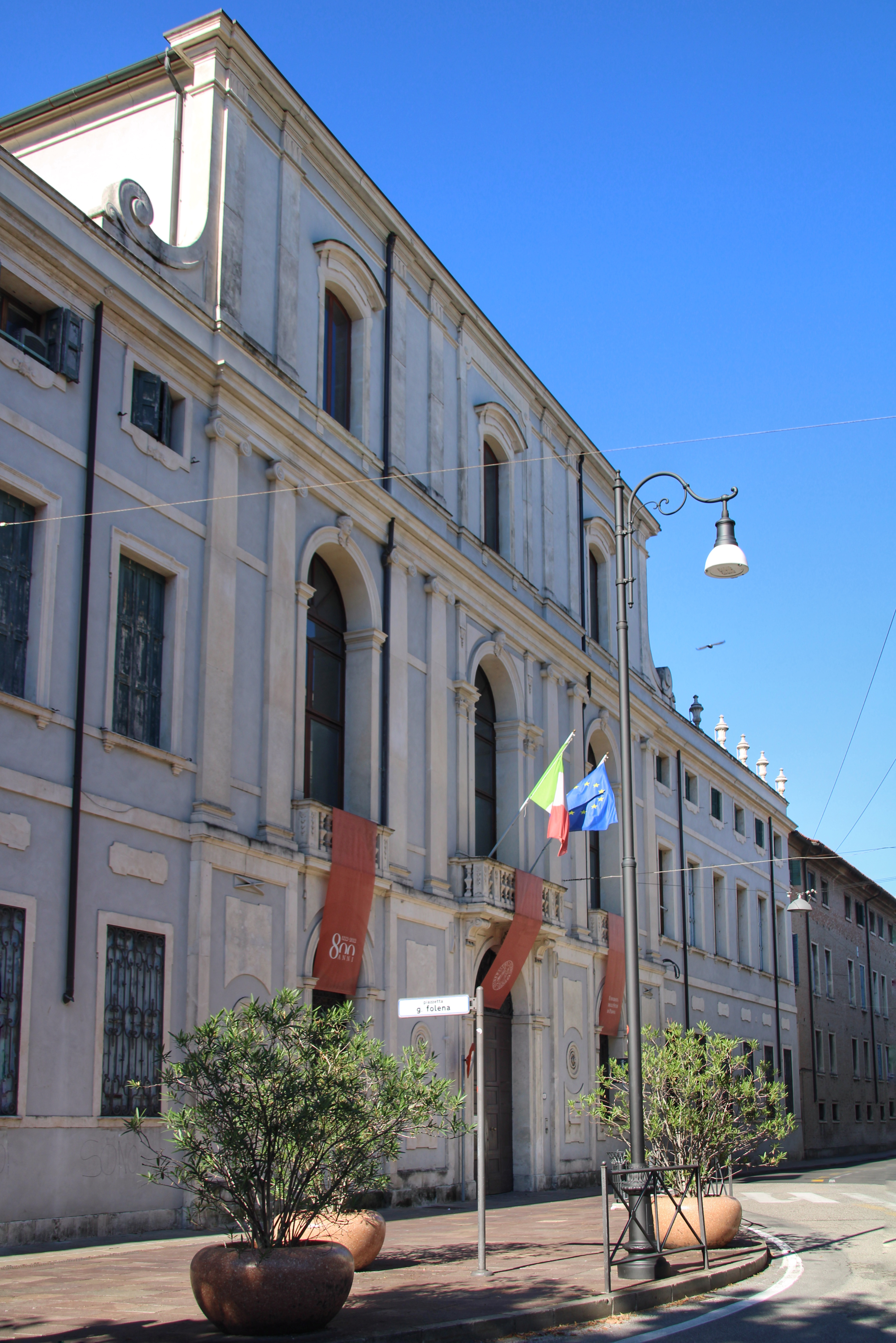
- Interactive map of the Palazzo Maldura area

General information
- Status: Active
- Location: Italy, Padua
- Coordinates: 45.4131°N 11.8728°E
- Opened: 16th century

Palazzo Maldura is a Padua civilian building, now the home of the Department of Language Studies and Literature at the University of Padua.

Built in the sixteenth century and overhauled, it was upgraded in 1769 and commissioned by lawyer Andrea Maldura (1730–1802) to architect Giovan Battista Novello.

In the palace there are numerous frescoes in a non-homogeneous order with respect to the location of the different premises.

== Notes ==
- Giuseppe Pavanello Pavanello, Venetian Art XXIX, p. 262-268.
