= Sotoportego =

Architectural element of Venice

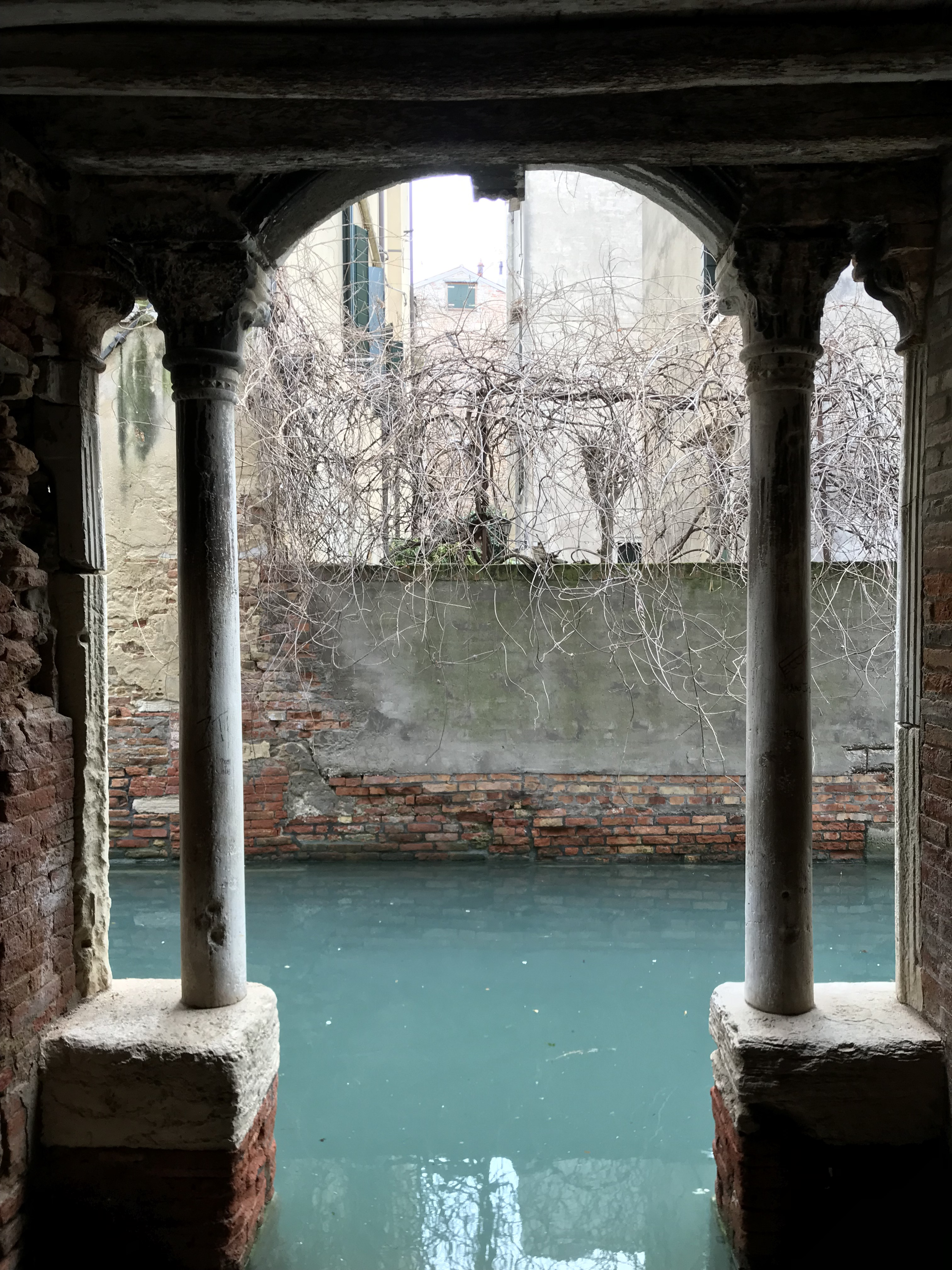
Sotoportego dei Nizioleti

Sotoportego (or sottoportego) is one of the characteristic elements of urban planning in the city of Venice.

It is a passageway that goes underneath a building. The sotoportego height typically equals to that of the ground floor. Oftentimes, the sotoportego is the only access to a courtyard or a small square. Many sotoporteghi contain sacred images of the saints or Madonna. The images can be bas-reliefs made of the Istrian stone or white marble.

== Types ==
There are three basic types of sotoporteghi:

- Sotoportego that connects a street (calle) or a campo with another street. This type is by far the most widespread in the city since in many cases these are absolutely necessary urban elements to ensure an access otherwise prevented by construction.
- Sotoportego that goes along a canal and provides a landing place for boats. This type represents a way to create covered banks for the loading and unloading of goods and passengers sheltered from the weather and is also relatively widespread in the city.
- Sotoportego that leads to a canal. This type creates a section of covered foundation. It is less widespread one but architecturally very impressive, since it combines peculiar aquatic, building, and road elements of the city.

== Gallery ==
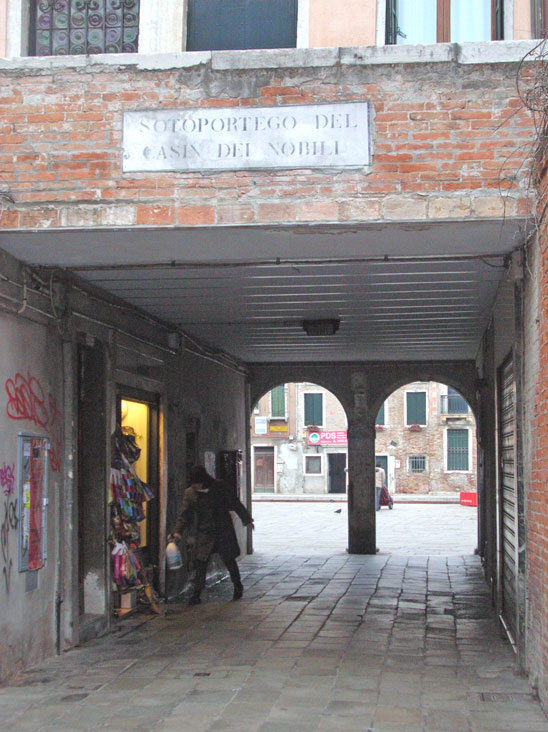
Typical sotoportego

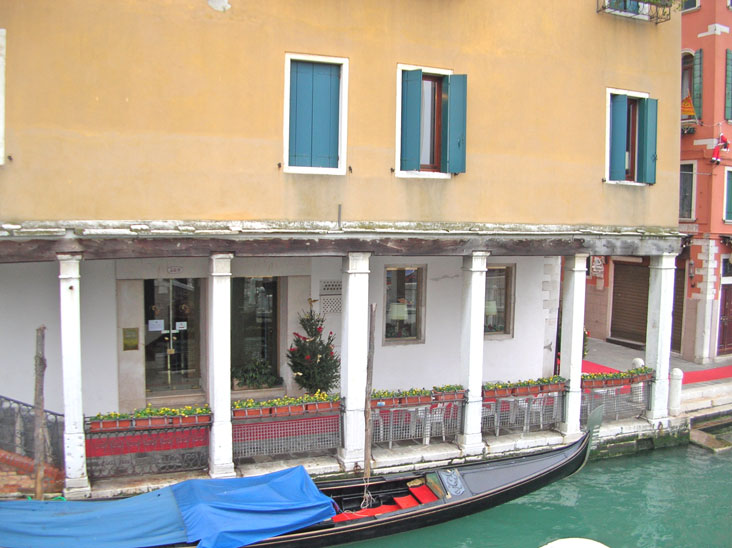
Sotoportego along a canal (Type 2)

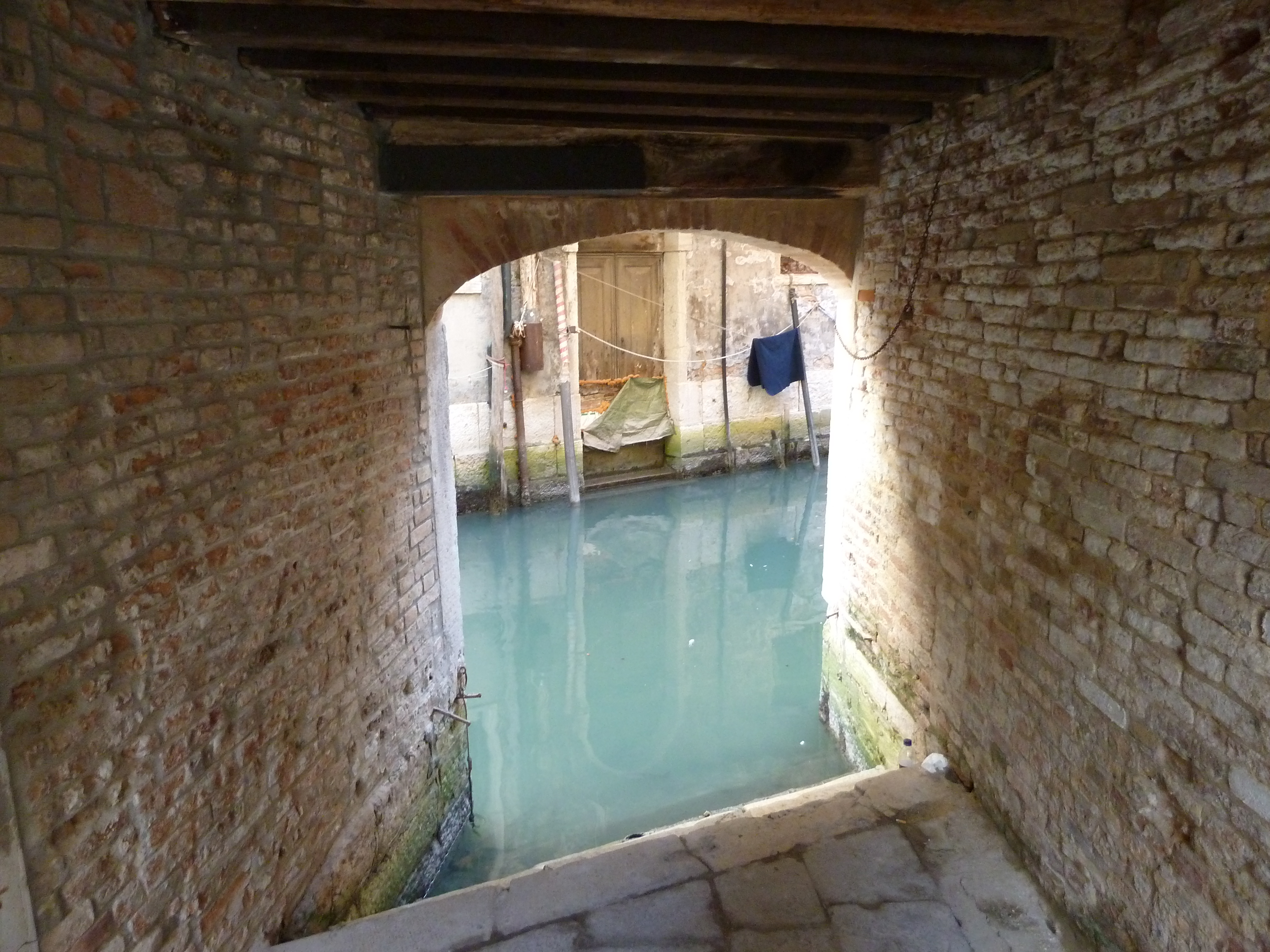
Rio del Cappello (Type 3)

== See also ==
- Portego
