= Sant'Andrea, Padua =

Church building in Padua, Italy

Coordinates: 45°24′30″N 11°52′37″E

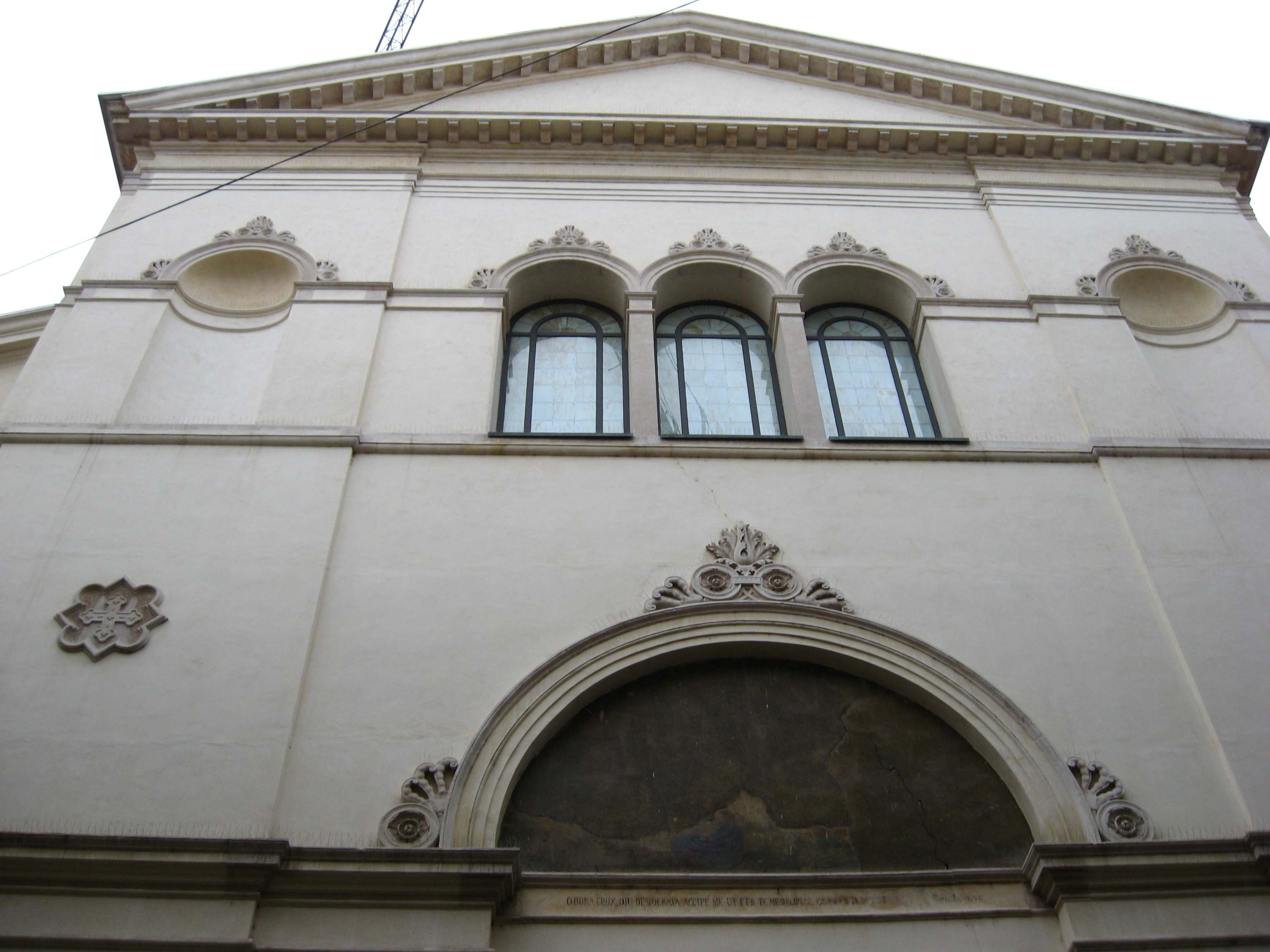
Partial view of Facade of church

Sant'Andrea is a Roman Catholic church located on Via Sant'Andrea in Padua, region of Veneto, Italy. Founded by the 12th century as a parish church, the present church was completed in the late 19th century.

== History ==
The church building has undergone multiple reconstructions since the 12th century, originally the church was oriented with facade to the west, and had a single nave with five altars. Adjacent to the hospital was a cemetery. Traces of the original facade can be seen on the left flank of the church. In 1614, the orientation was changed. The churches artworks were confiscated during the Napoleonic rule. A further reconstruction, from 1875 to 1884 gives us the present layout and Neo-Romanesque decoration. A new belltower was erected in 1920.

=== Decoration ===
The present ceiling was painted by Antonio Grinzato, this replaces the Apotheosis of St Andrew that had been painted by Giovanni Battista Mengardi. The semicircular apse now houses the marble altar once found in the church of San Marco in Padua, now razed. It has three reliefs by Francesco Bonazza, depicting biblical scenes:Sacrifice of Isaac, Dinner at Emma Emmaus, and the Paschal Lamb. The lateral altars have paintings from various centuries, some moved to this church during the 19th century. They include a Miracle by St Francis Xavier by Natale Plache, originally from the extant Church of the Gesuiti in Padua; a St Martin in Glory (17th-century) once the main altarpiece of the church of San Martino in Padua; and two 16th-century canvases depicting the Adoration by the Magi and Adoration by the Shepherds. The organ was built in 1962, and enlarged in the 1970s.

Outside of the church is a much-damaged stone column with a lion. The column was erected by the community in 1209 to celebrate the role of members of the parish in the battle of Padua against the marquis of Este, Azzo VI of Este. In riots surrounding the Napoleonic occupation of the Veneto in 1796, the column was nearly destroyed.

== Bibliography ==
- La chiesa di sant'Andrea in Padova, Editoriale Programma
- Giovambattista Rossetti, Descrizione delle pitture, sculture, ed architetture di Padova, in Padova MDCCLXXX Stamperia del Seminario
- Padova Basiliche e chiese, Neri Pozza Editore
- Giuseppe Toffanin, Le strade di Padova, Newton e Compton Editori
