= Portego =

Aspect of Venetian civil buildings

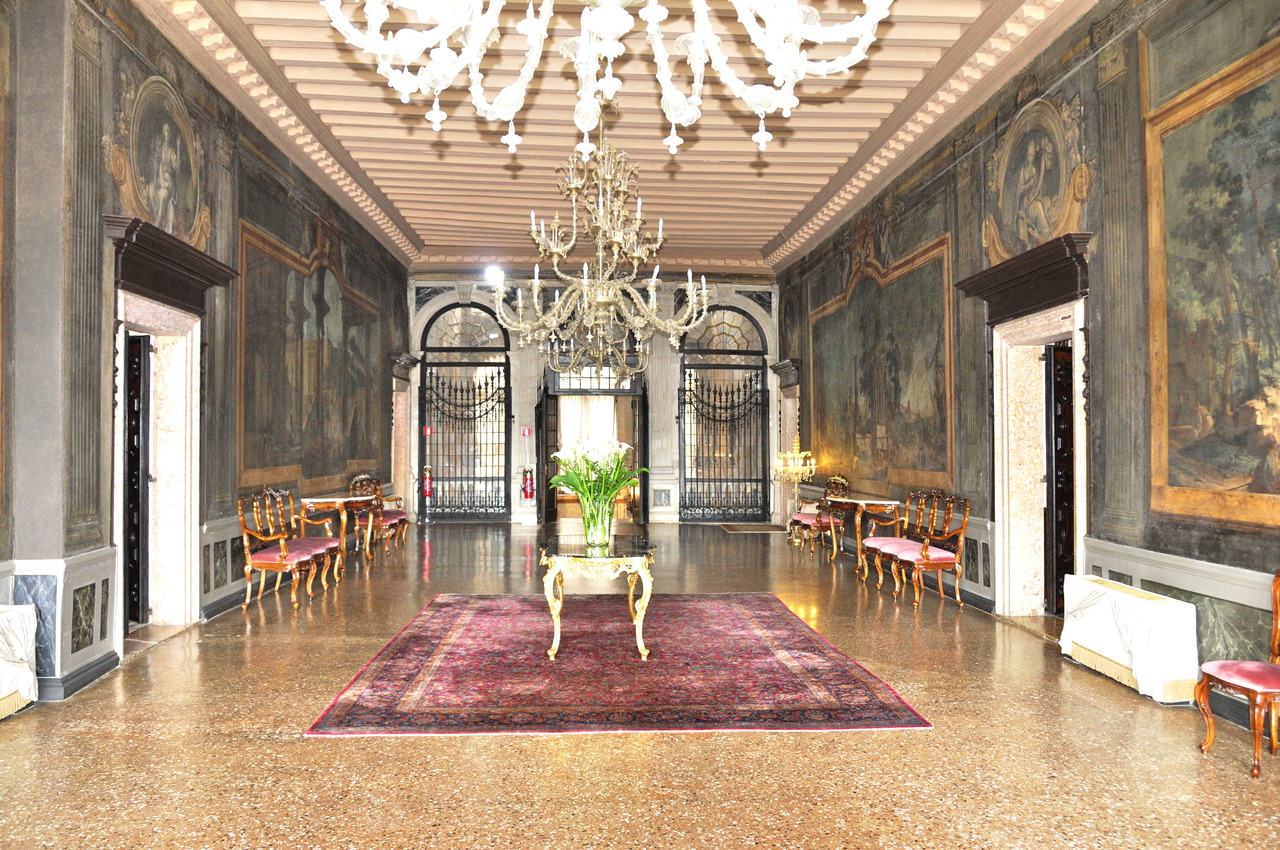
The portego of Palazzo Morosini Sagredo terminates with the monumental staircase designed by Andrea Tirali

Portego ("porch" in Venetian dialect) is a characteristic compositional element of the Venetian civil buildings built during the years of the Republic of Venice. The portego is similar to a reception hall but has peculiar features.

== History ==
The portego is known from the ancient times; it is present even in the oldest Venetian palaces. In later centuries and especially during the emergence of the Renaissance architecture, the portego original central structure has changed substantially, allowing for T-shaped and L-shaped halls.

== Function ==
In a typical Venetian palace, the portego is the local passage hall that joins the water portal with the land portal. On the ground floor, it serves as an entrance hall for loading goods, while on the upper floors the portego is used both as a reception hall and as a passing hall to access other rooms, located on both sides. Furthermore, the portego was crucial in providing ventilation and air circulation for the palazzo which, especially during medieval summers, allowed for respite from the humid weather and smells emitted from the often sewer infested waterways of Venice.

== Architecture ==
Usually, the portego joins the water portal and the ground portal and may pass through the court. This large room is usually decorated by a multi-light polifora, its size depending on the width of the interior. In the traditional palazzo, for example Palazzo Loredan dell'Ambasciatore, the staircase is placed at the portego.

== Gallery ==
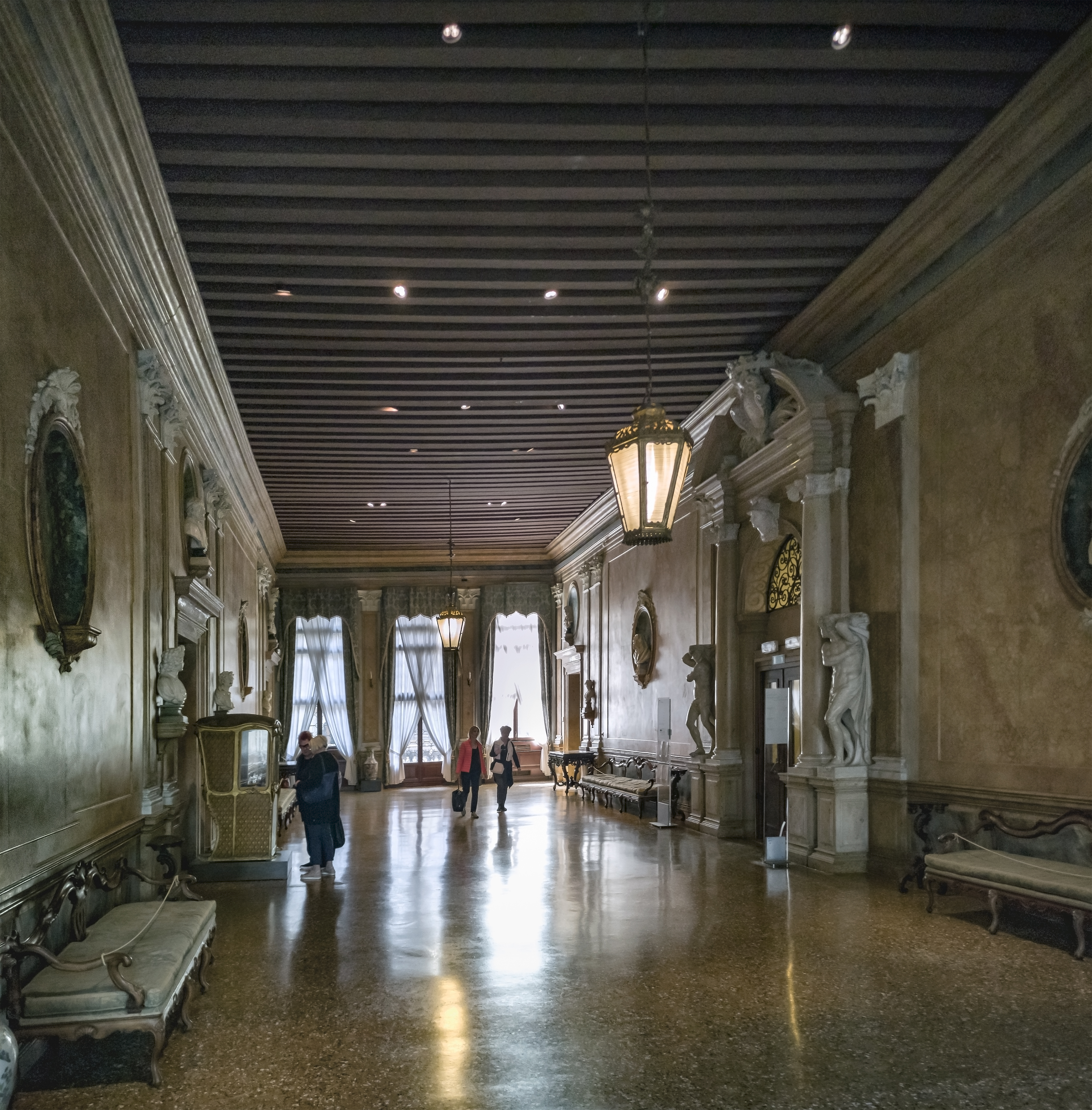
Portego of Ca' Rezzonico

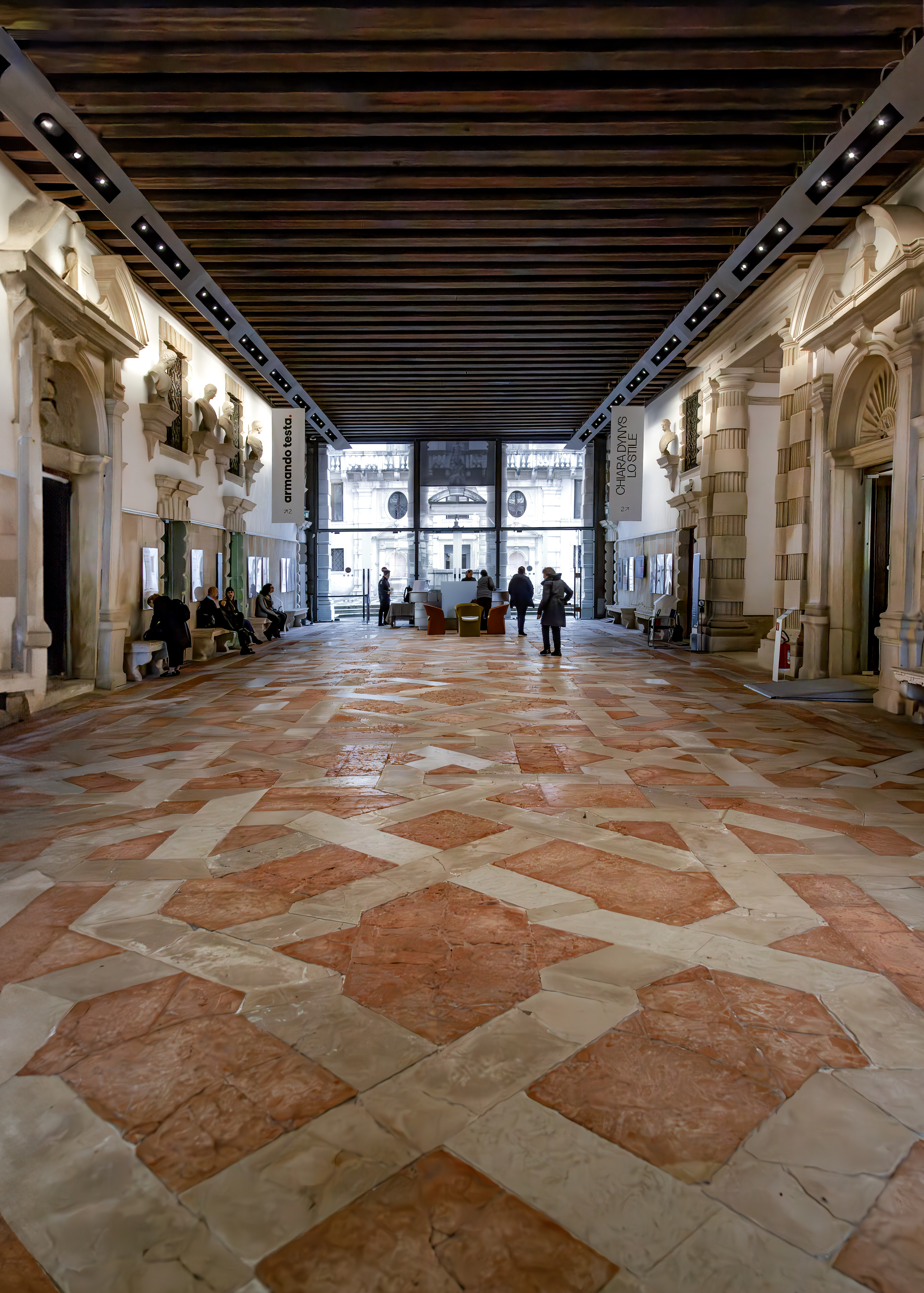
Portego of Ca' Pesaro

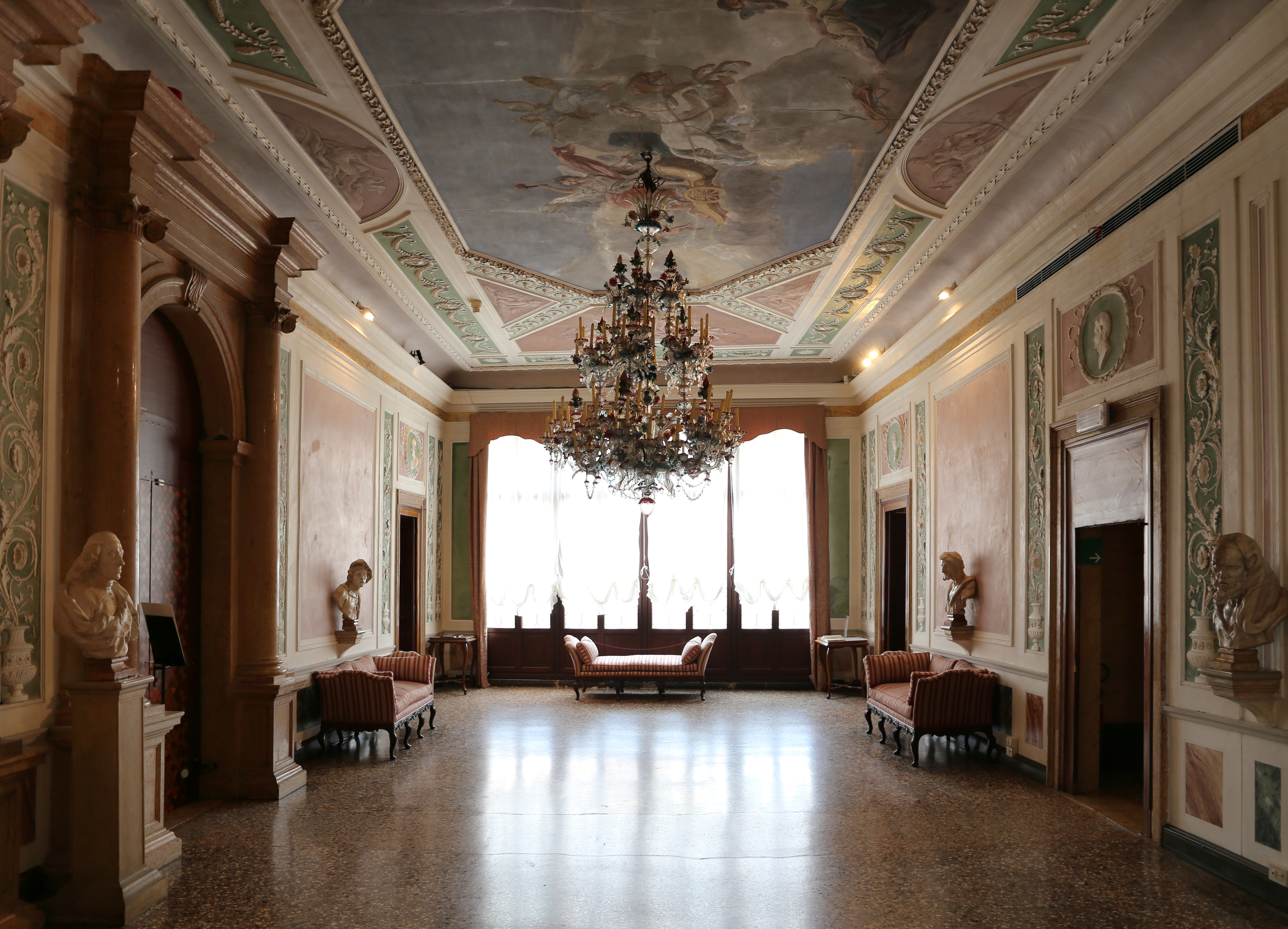
Portego of Palazzo Querini Stampalia

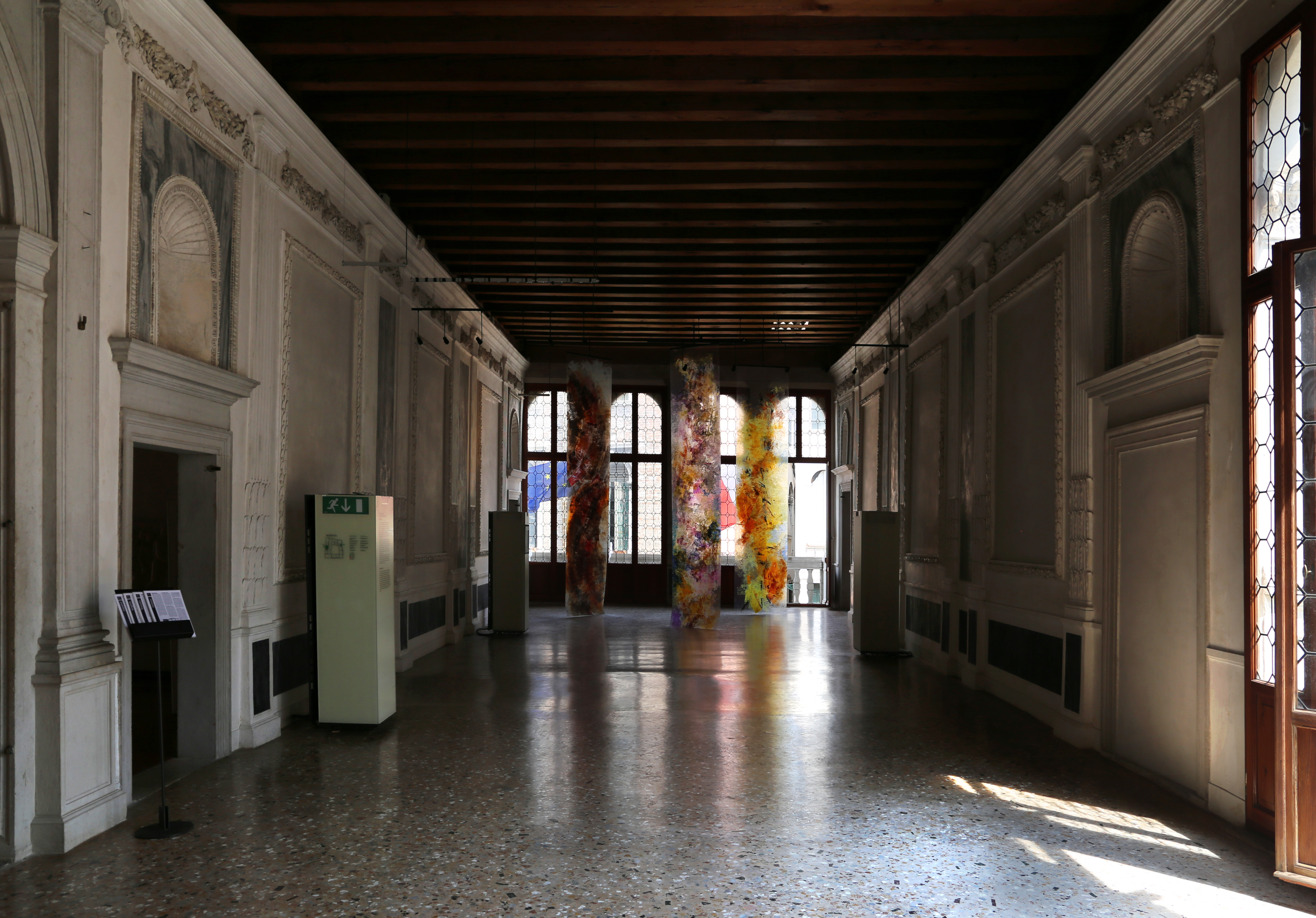
Portego of Palazzo Grimani di Santa Maria Formosa

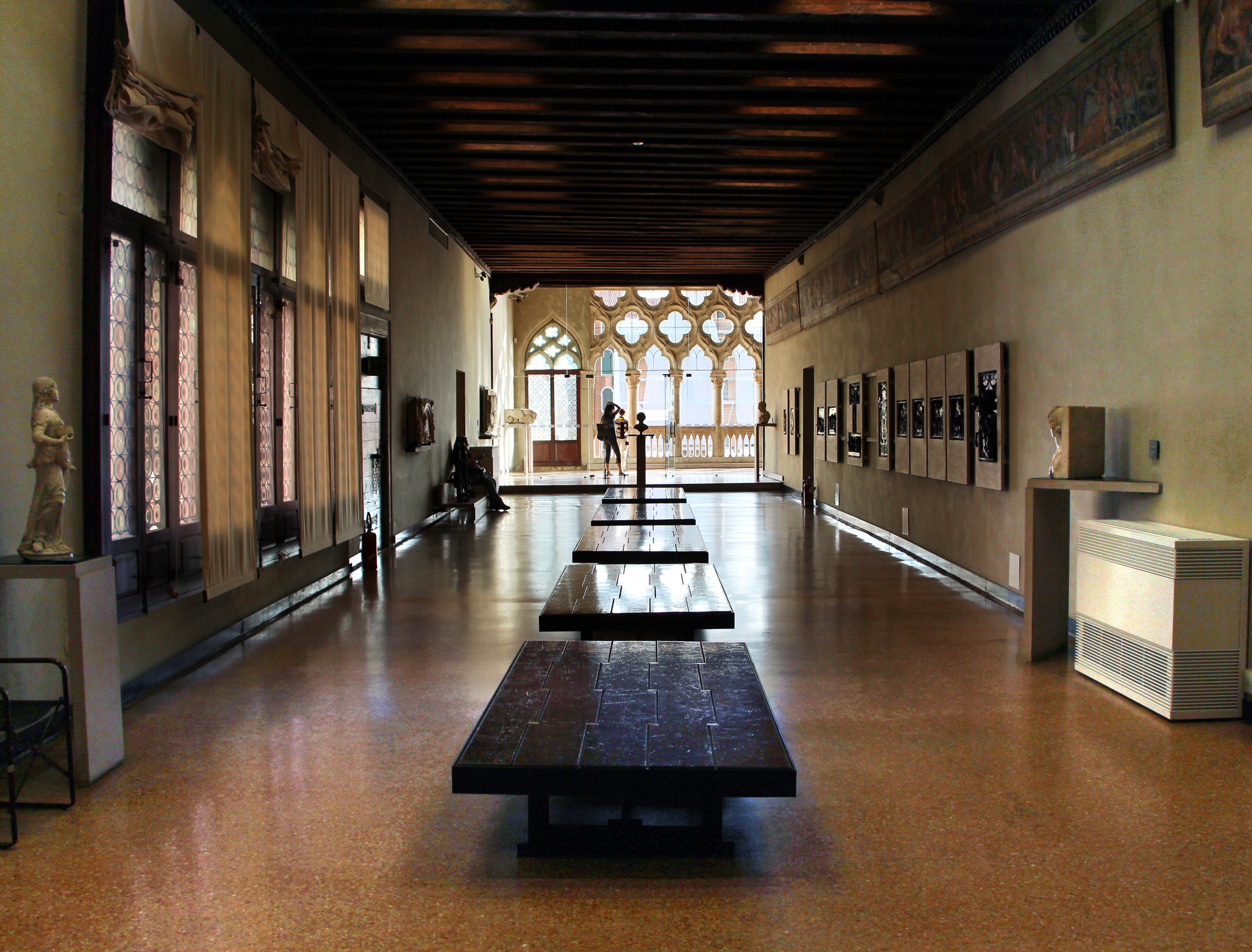
Portego of Ca' d'Oro

== See also ==
- Sotoportego
