= Moggi =

Moggi (Italian pronunciation: [ˈmɔddʒi]) is an Italian surname. Notable people with the surname include:

- Eugenio Moggi, Italian professor of computer science
- Luciano Moggi (born 1937), Italian football administrator
