= Campo (Venice) =

City square in Venice, Italy

A campo is a city square in Venice, Italy. Most neighborhoods have a campo, including the Jewish Ghetto, but not every campo is notable.

== List of campos ==
This is a list of notable campos in Venice.

=== Cannaregio ===
- Campo Sant'Alvise
- Campo dei Gesuiti
- Campo del Ghetto Novo
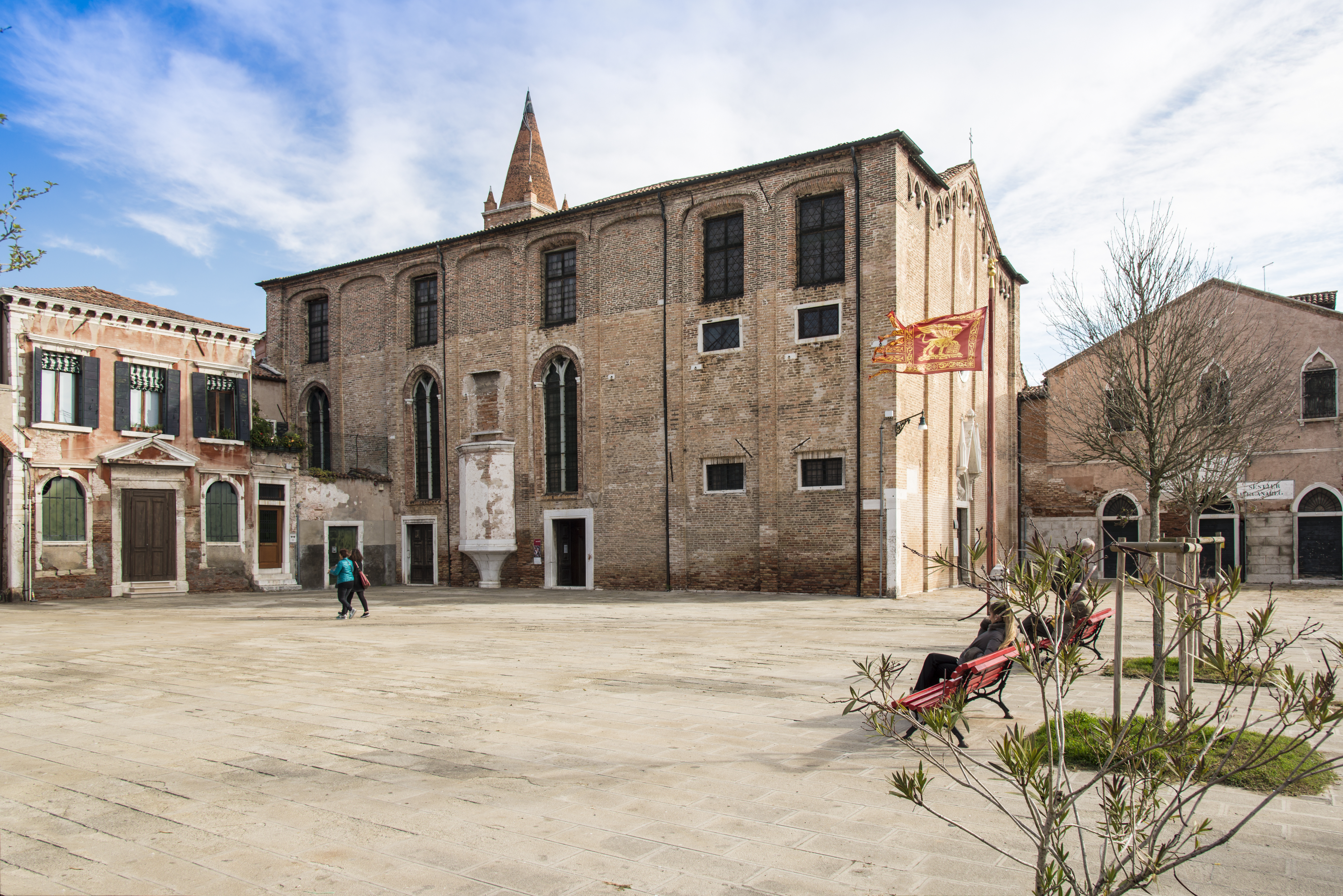
Campo Sant'Alvise

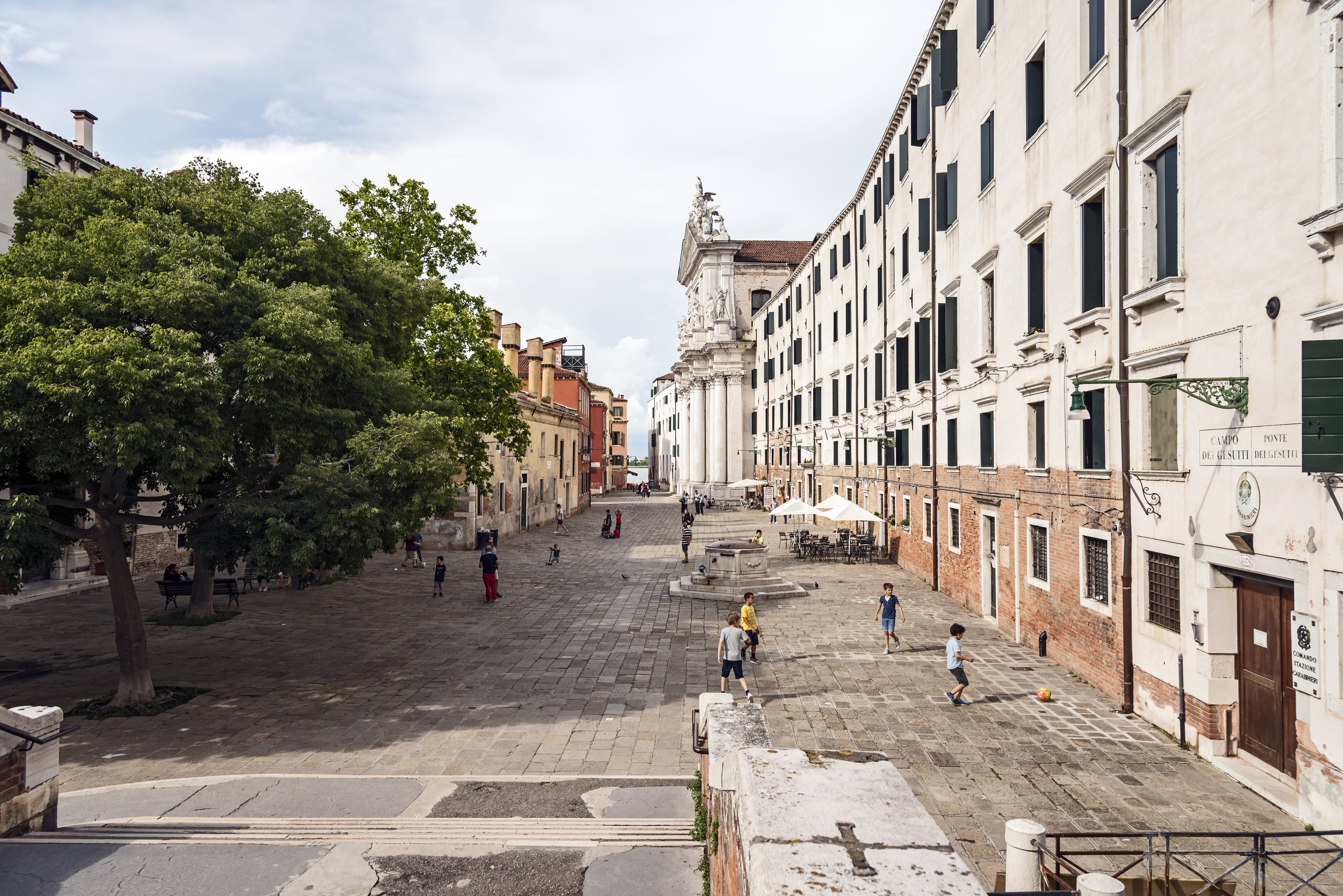
Campo dei Gesuiti

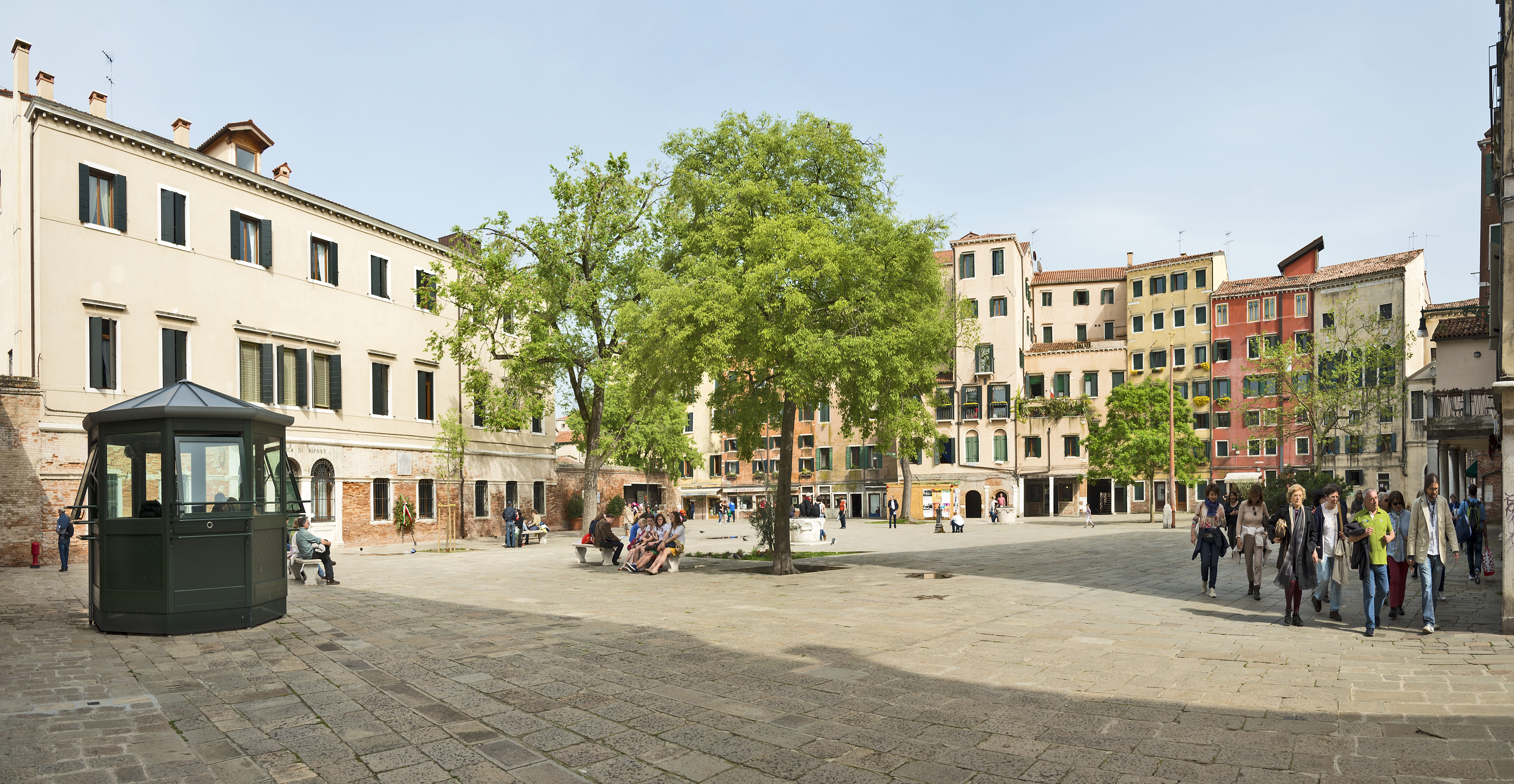
Campo del Ghetto Novo

=== Castello ===
- Campo San Provolo
- Campo Santa Marina
- Campo Santi Giovanni e Paolo
- Campo San Pietro di Castello
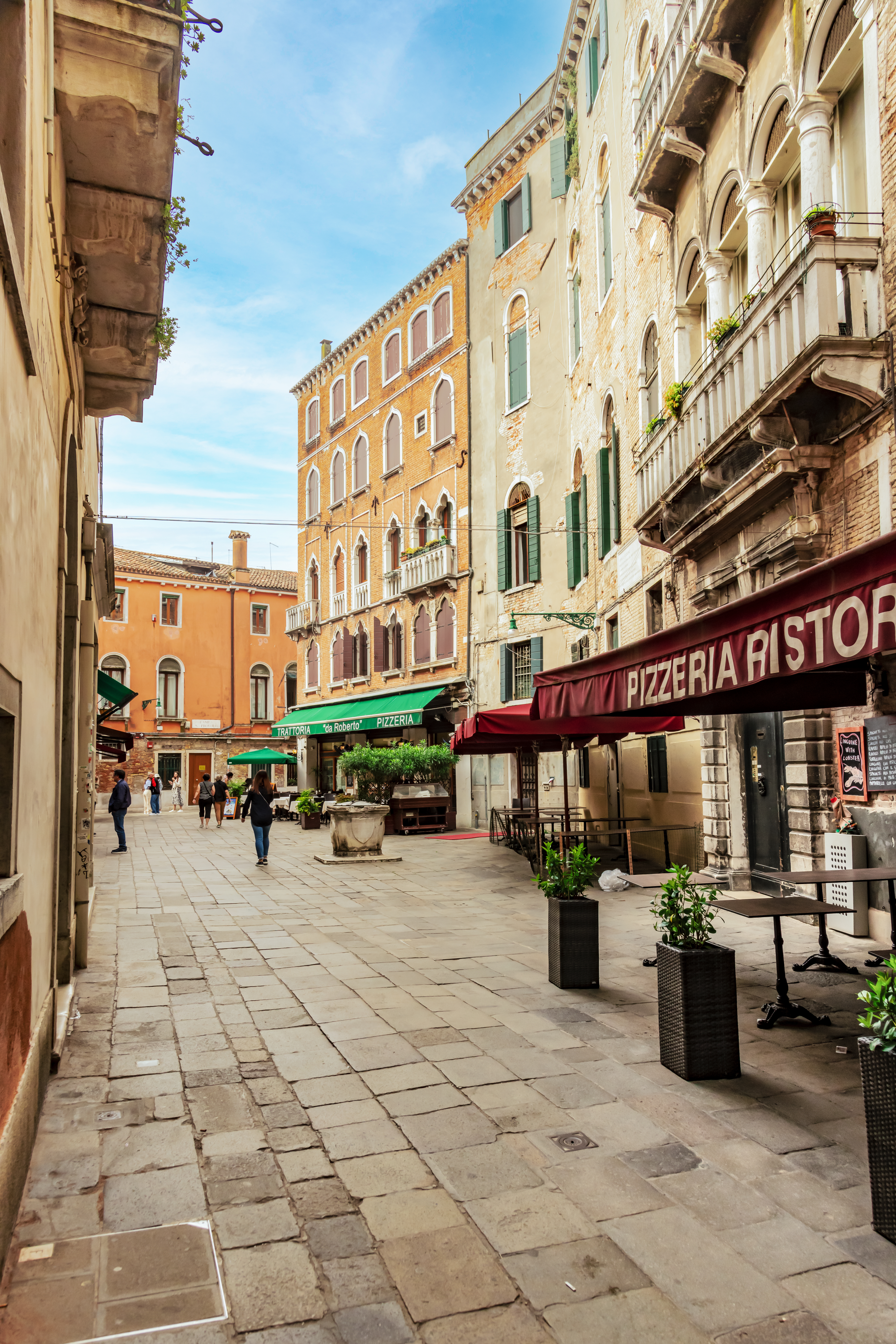
Campo San Provolo

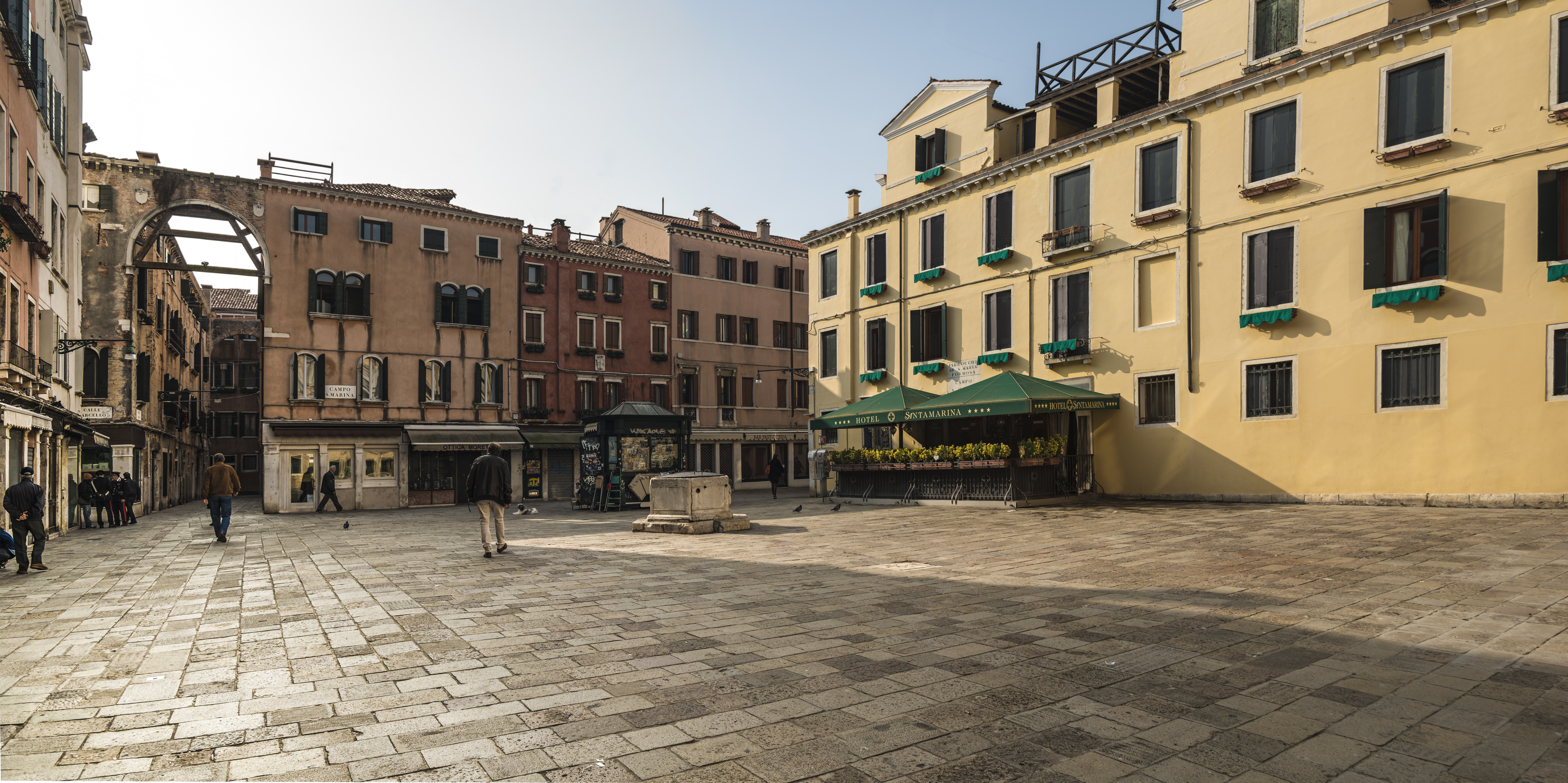
Campo Santa Marina

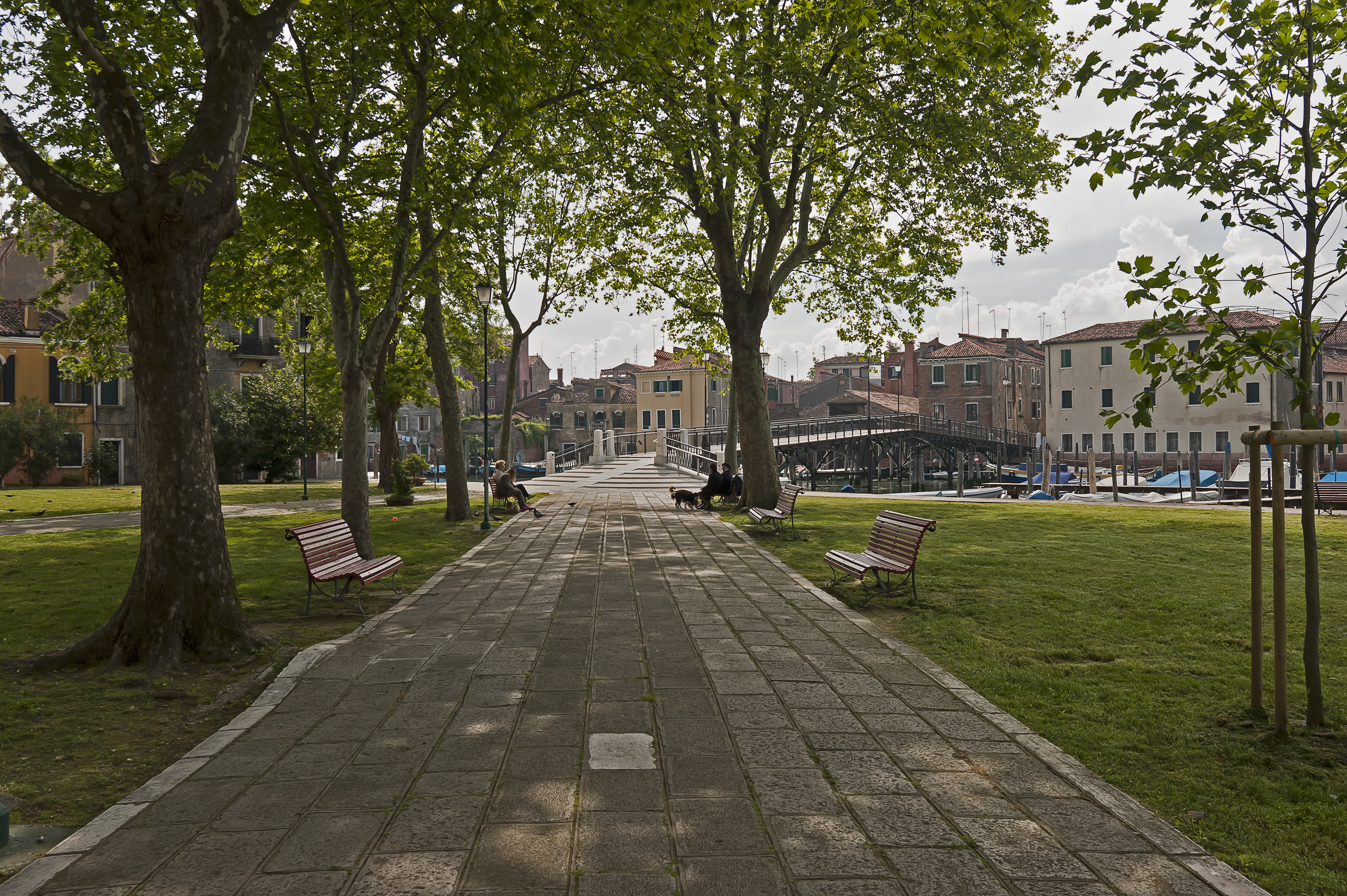
Campo San Pietro di Castello

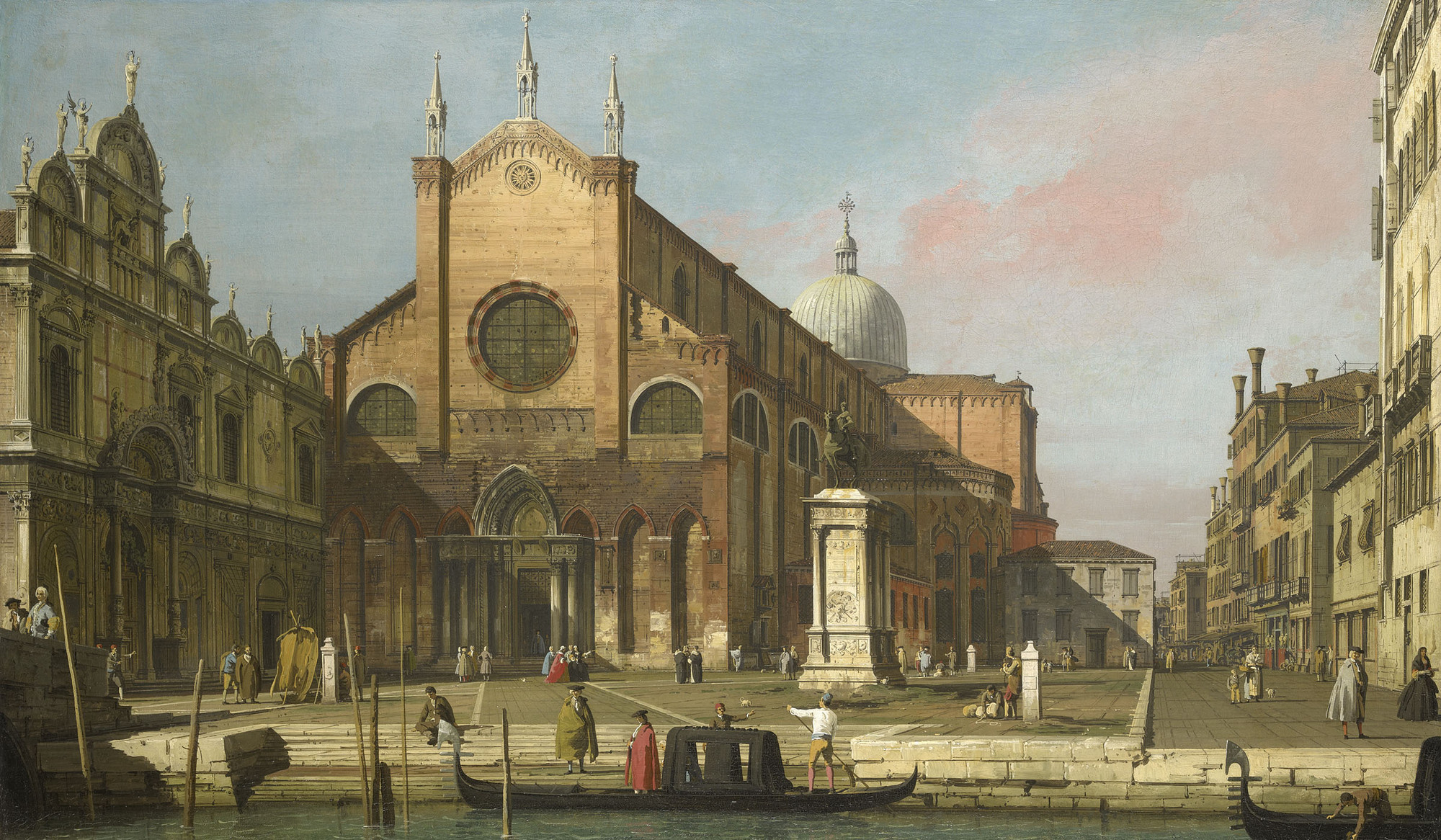
Campo san Zanipolo, Canaletto

=== Dorsoduro ===
- Campo Santa Margherita
- Campo San Trovaso (Dorsoduro)
- Campo della Salute (Dorsoduro)
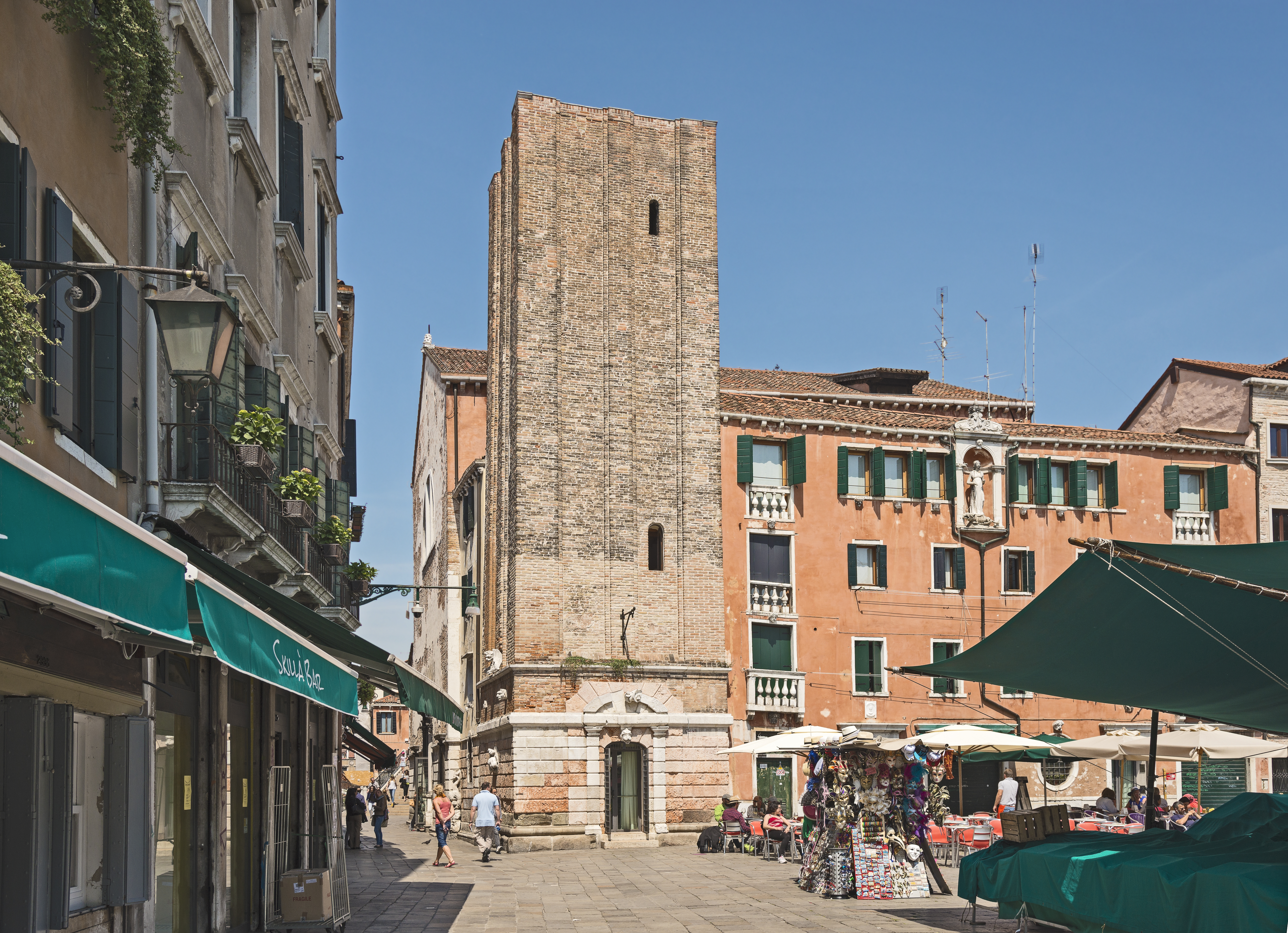
Campo Santa Margherita

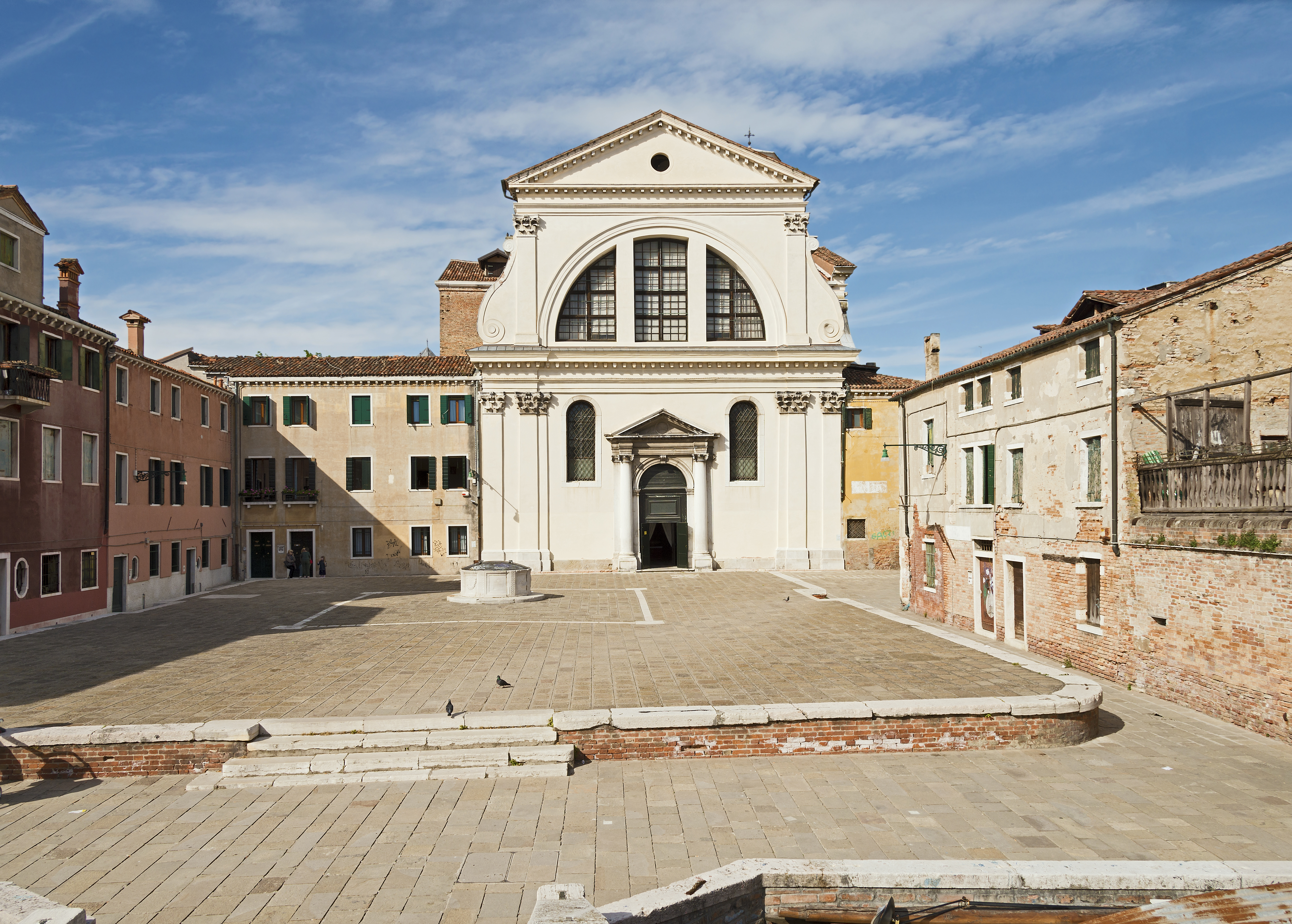
Campo San Trovaso

=== Santa Croce ===
- Campo dei Tolentini
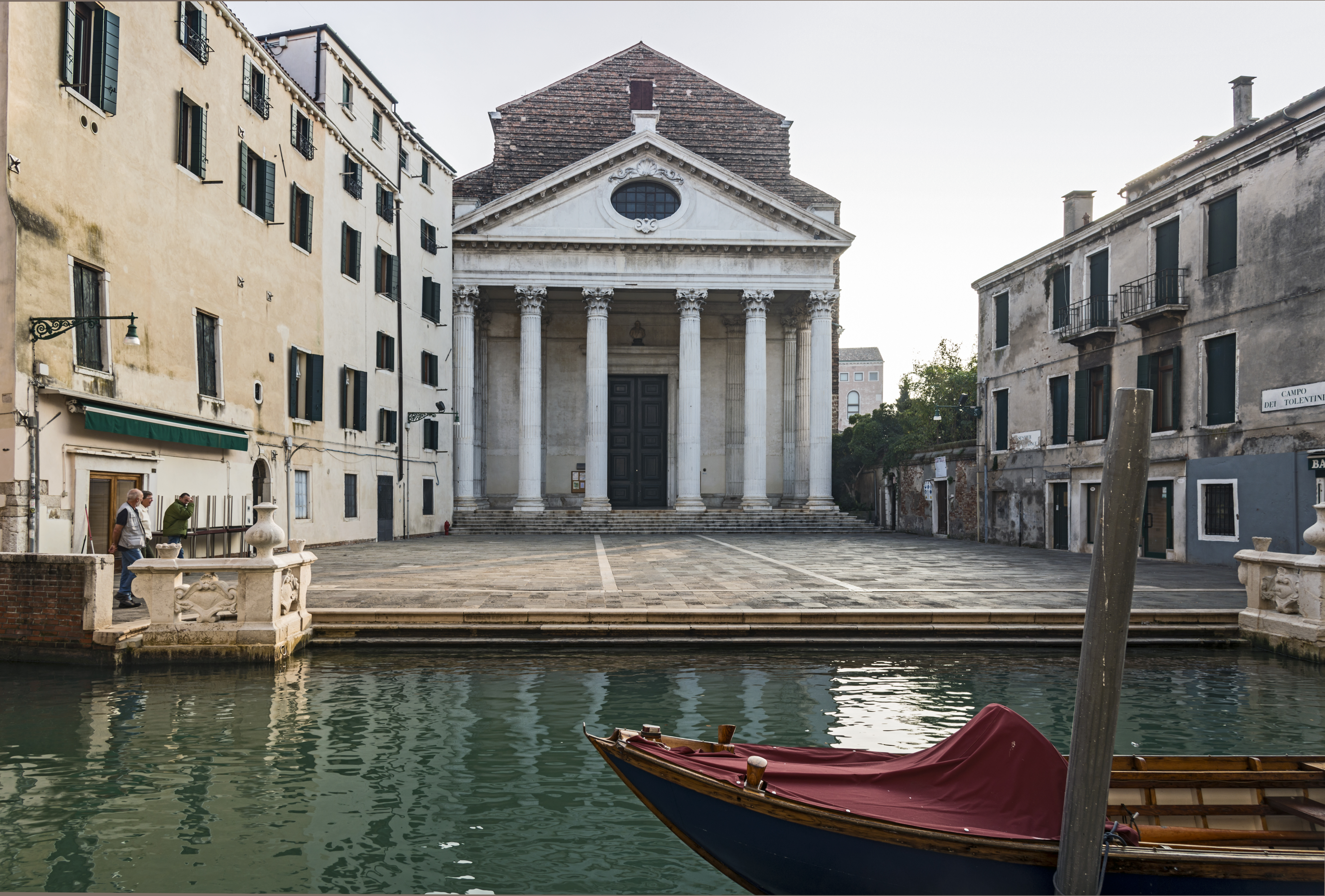
Campo, rio, and church dei Tolentini

=== San Marco ===
- Campo Manin
- Campo Sant'Angelo
- Campo San Luca
- Campo Santo Stefano
- Campo San Bartolomeo
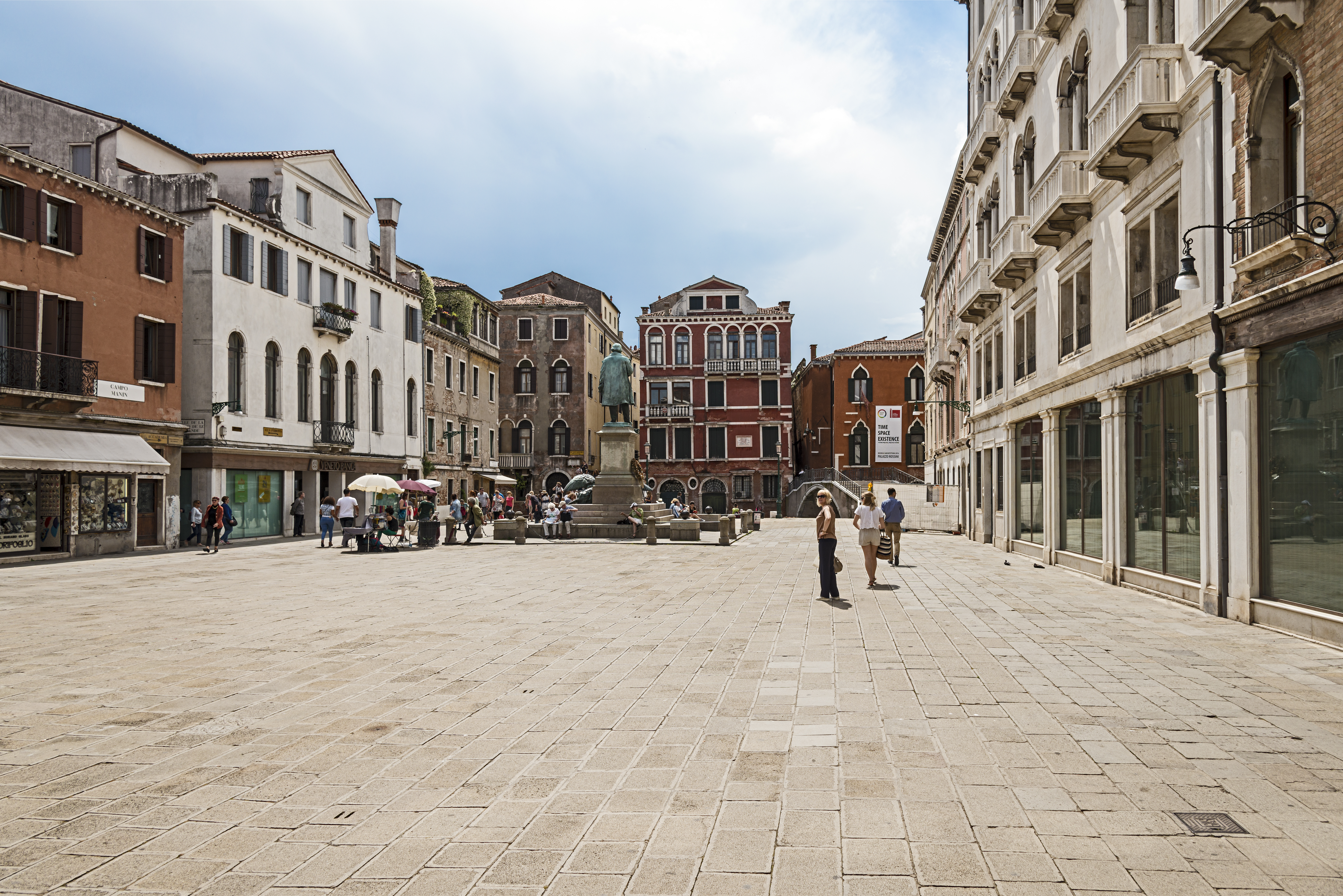
Campo Manin

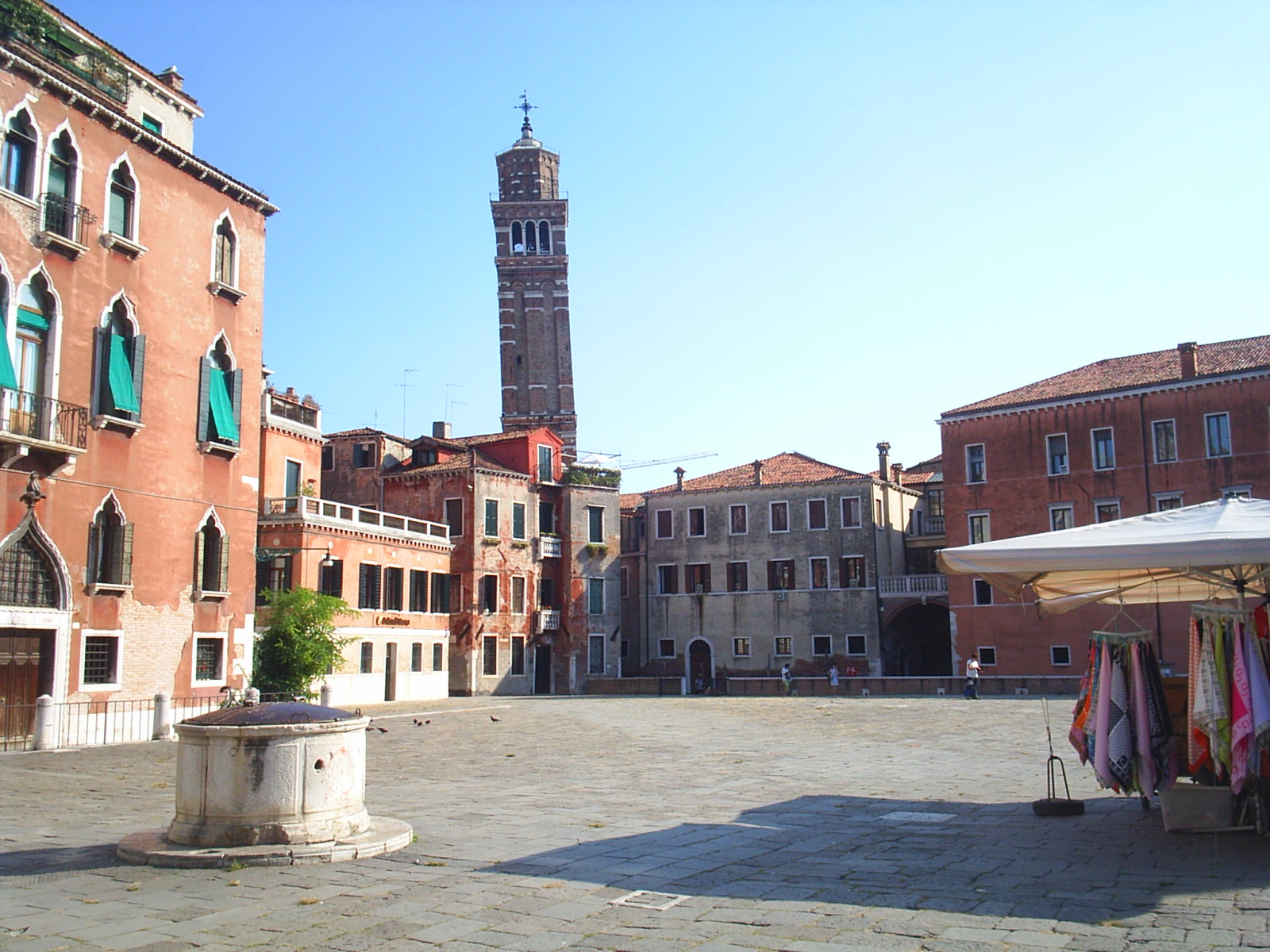
Campo Sant'Angelo

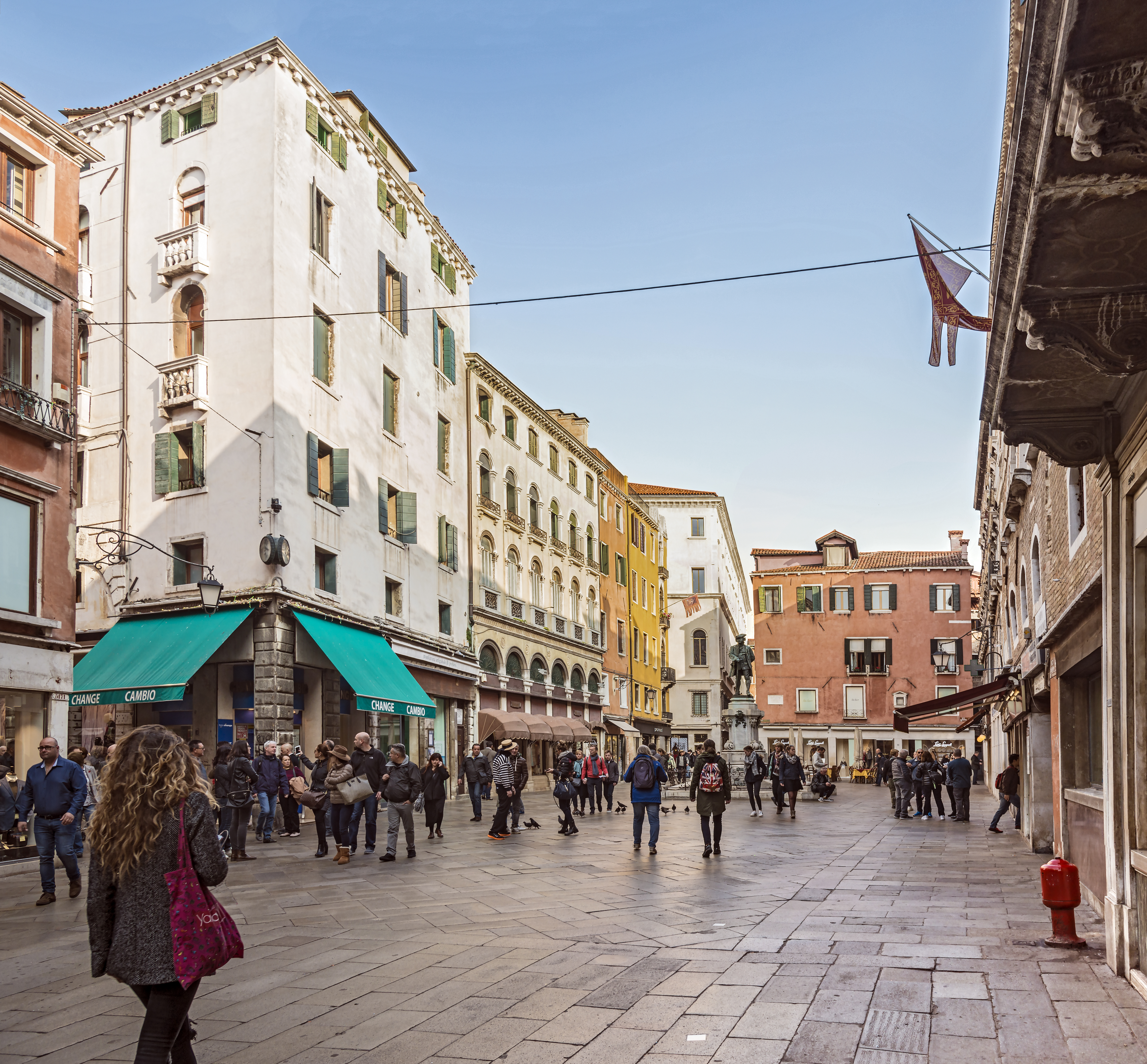
Campo San Bartolomeo

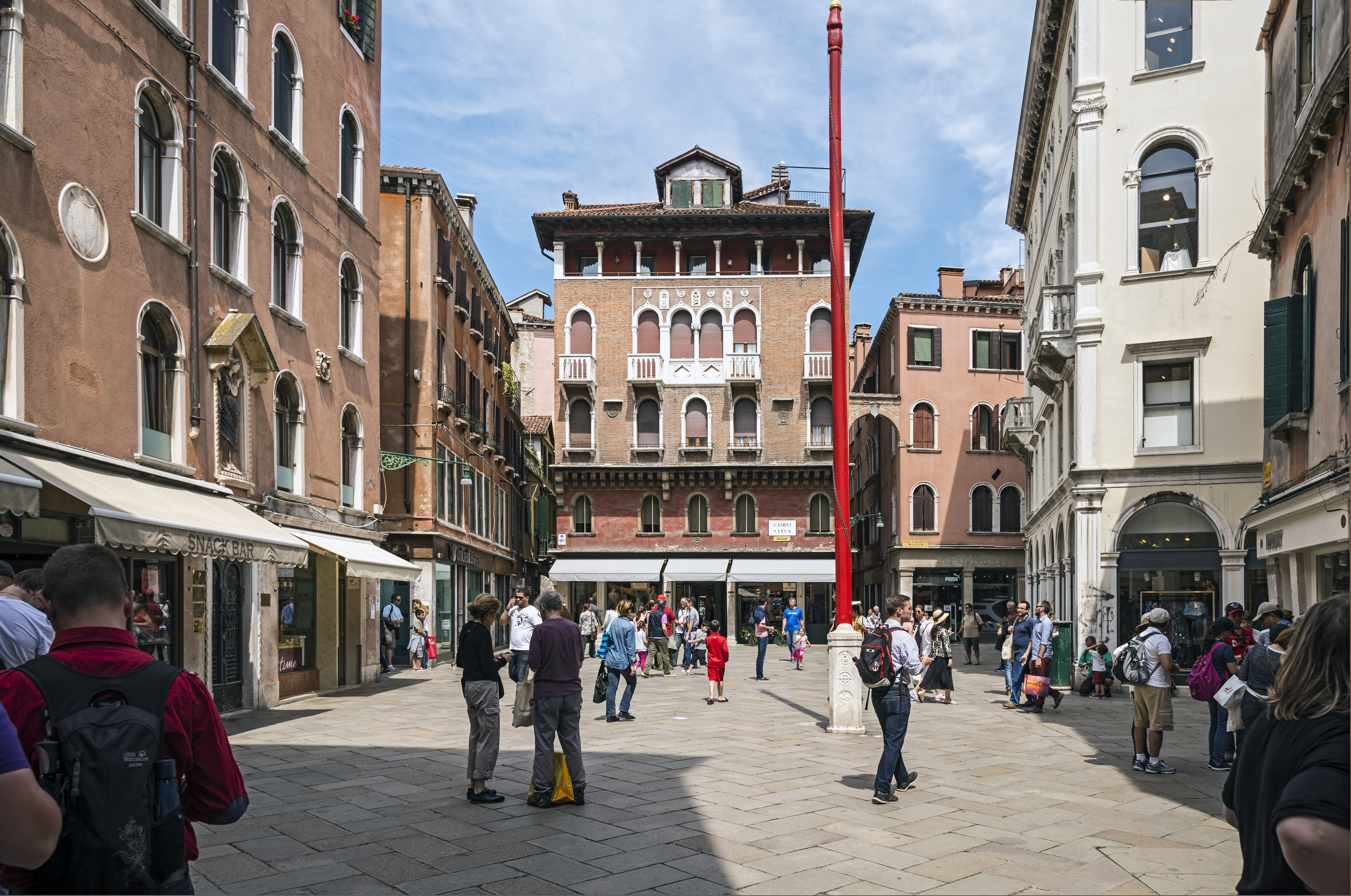
Campo San Luca

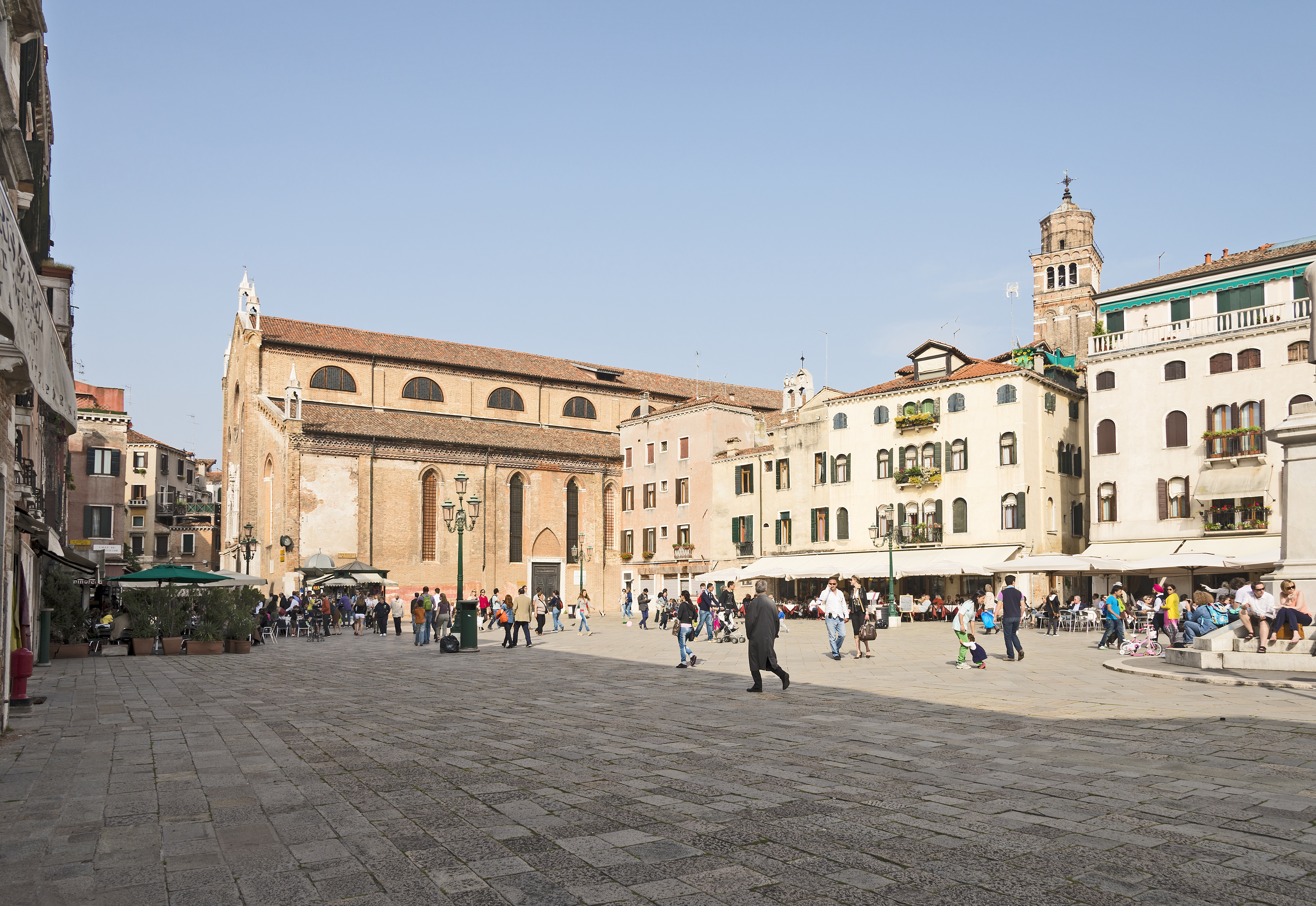
Campo Santo Stefano

=== San Polo ===
- Campo dei Frari
- Campo San Polo
- Campo San Stin
- Campo Rialto Novo
- Campo Rocco
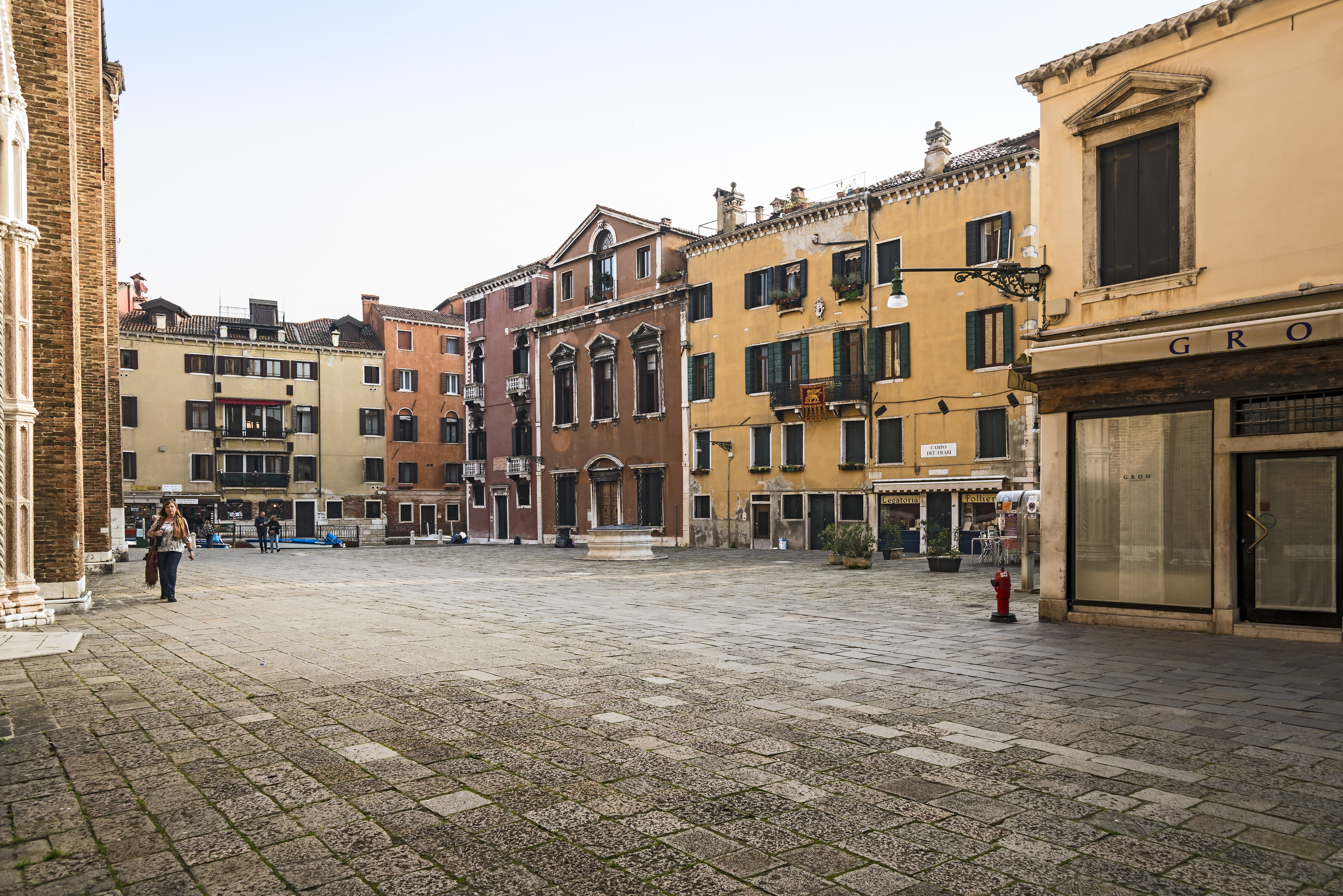
Campo dei Frari

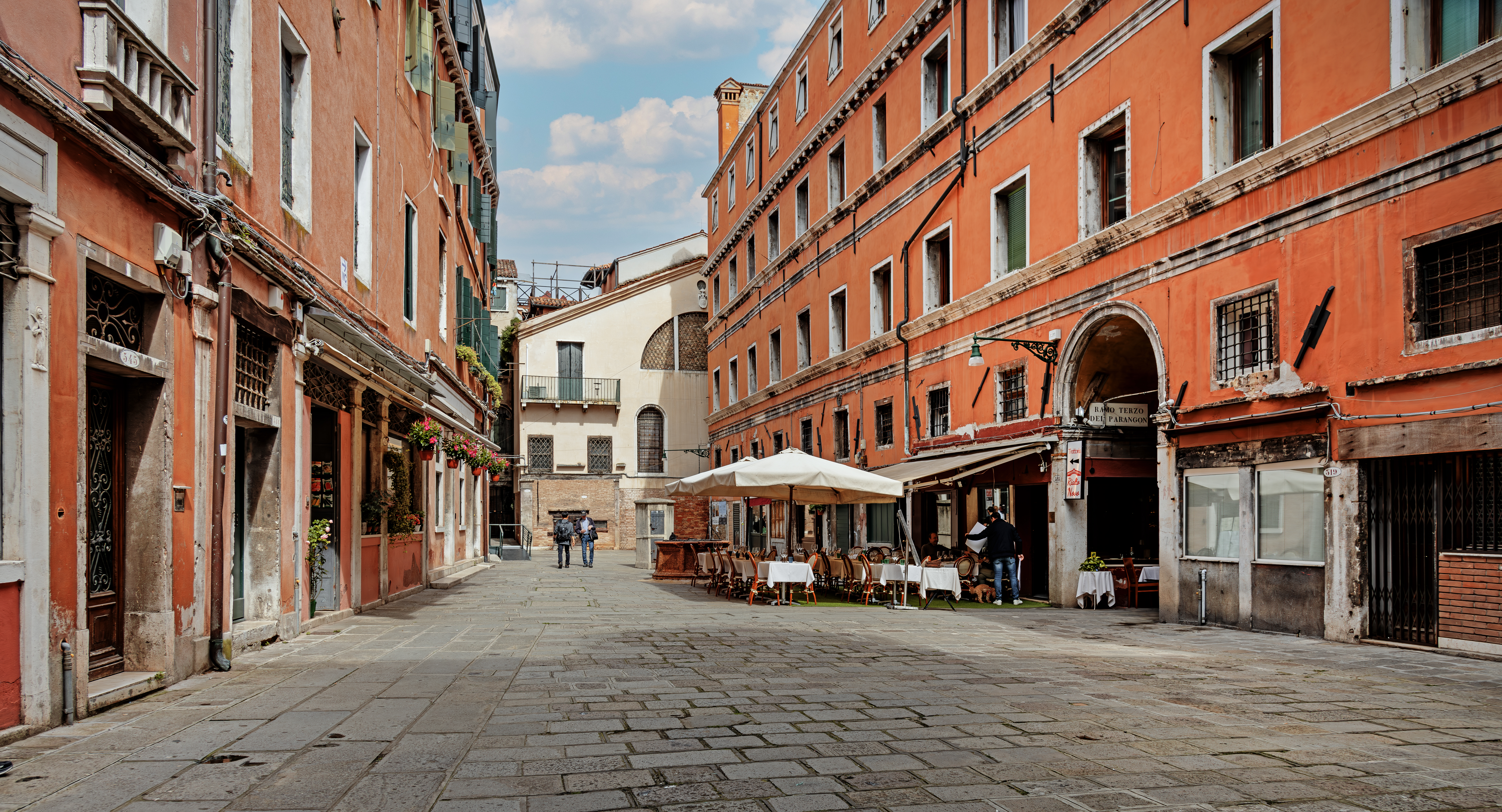
Campo Rialto Novo

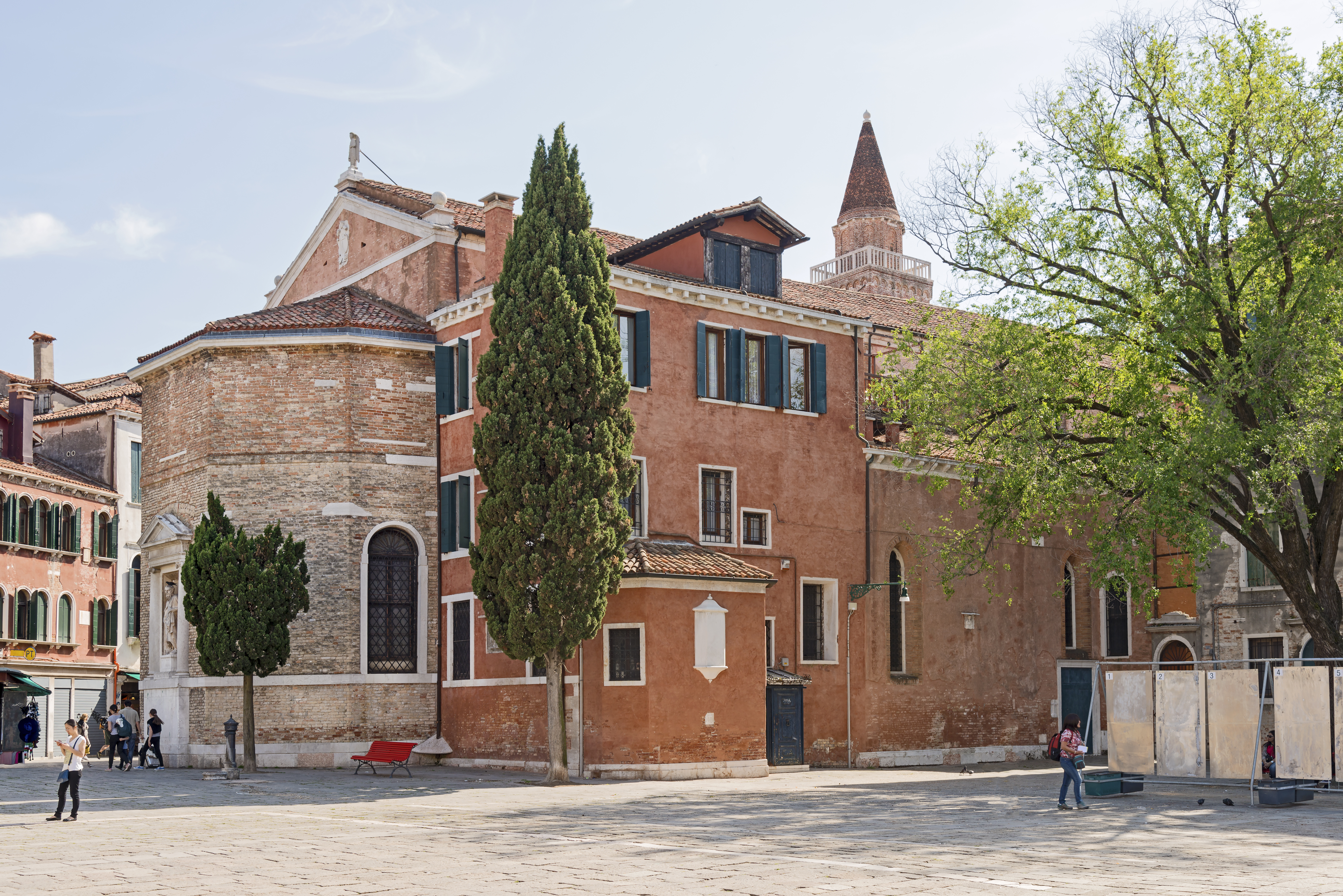
Campo San Polo

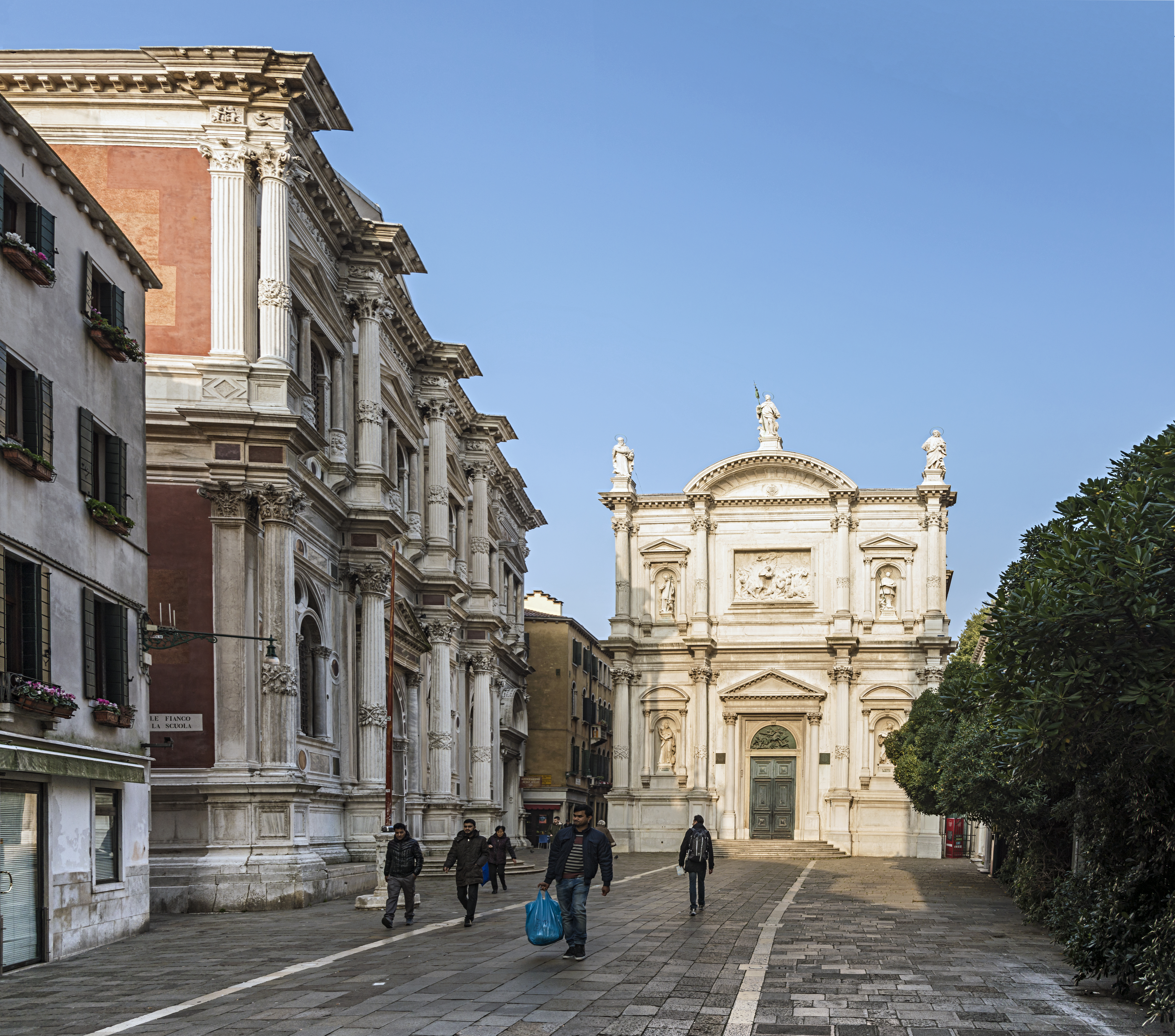
Campo San Rocco
