= Istituto Venezia =

School

Istituto Venezia scuola di lingua e Cultura Italiana a Venezia e Trieste is a private school of Italian for foreigners involved in spreading the Italian language and culture. The school is located in Campo Santa Margherita in Venice and since 2004 has been located in the city centre of Trieste.

The institute is officially acknowledged by the Ministry of Education, University and Scientific Research of Italy, (prot. March 1999), as a member of Asils and Tandem International.

== History ==
Istituto Venezia was founded in 1995 as Istituto Zambler Venezia by Maddalena Angelino, Massimo Brunzin, Susanna Lasala, Anna Santini e Matteo Savini, current partners and promoters of the Istituto. Since the beginning, the school has been characterized by continuing teaching research inspired by communicative language teaching /the communicative approach.

First situated in Cannaregio, in Palazzo Pesaro Papafava, in 1998 the school moved to the university quarter, finally settling in Campo Santa Margherita; a meeting place loved by students and Venetians. At the same time, the school's popularity increased thanks to rising student numbers and to the introduction of new activities, integrating art history and Italian cooking classes.

In 2004, the school opened an additional school in Trieste and continues the historical connection between Trieste and Venice. In Trieste, summer courses involve hundreds of students taught by qualified staff.

Istituto Venezia has almost 20 collaborators and an average of 1400 students per year at both locations of Venice and Trieste, where students stay for an average period of four weeks.

The school also arranges art tours around Venice and Trieste, as well as specialized language courses and activities in literature, body communication, cinema, and photography.

== Certifications, accreditations and acknowledgements ==
Officially acknowledged by the Ministry of Education, University and Scientific Research of Italy

Collaboration with

- Venice International University
- Laboratorio Itals dell'Università Ca' Foscari di Venezia
- Associazione internazionale Intercultura

Collaboration for study abroad program with American and European Universities:

- University of California at Berkeley
- Ucla University (University of California Los Angeles)
- Purdue University, West Lafayette, Indiana
- Colgate University NY
- College Consortium for International Studies (CCIS NY)
- Flathead Valley Community College, MT
- John Hall University
- Virginia University

Membership:

- Member of ASILS, Associazione Scuole Italiano Lingua Seconda
- Member of Tandem International, International Network of Quality Language Institutes
