= Campo San Bartolomeo =

Square in Venice, Italy

Coordinates: 45.4377°N 12.3369°E

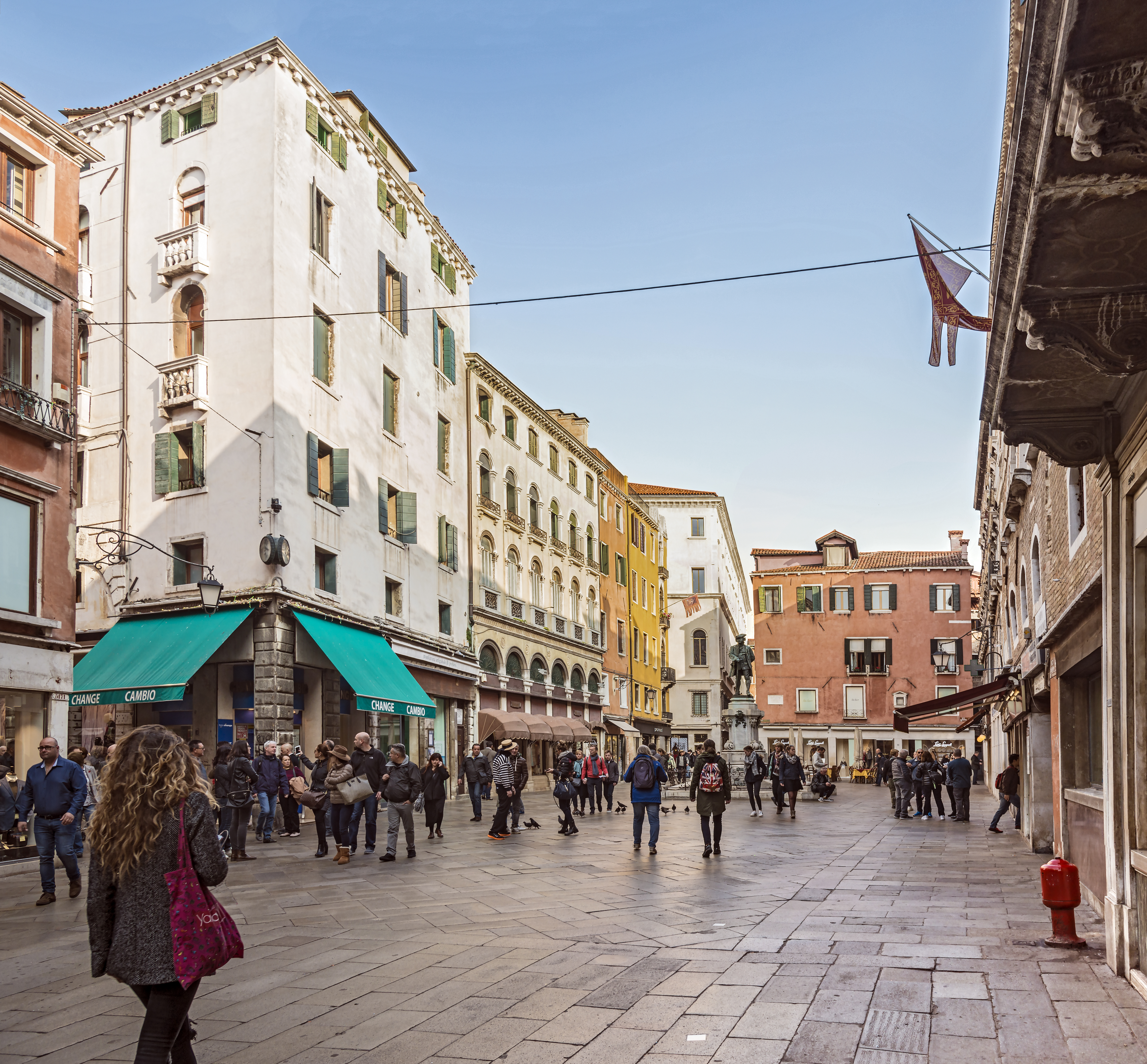
Campo San Bartolomeo

Campo San Bartolomeo is a city square in Venice, Italy. It is considered the socio-commercial heart of Venice. This square is popular due to its location, as it is home to important buildings, banks and churches. It has been a popular tourist destination since the early 1900s (decade).

In the center of the campo stands the famous monument in memory of Carlo Goldoni, by Antonio Dal Zotto in 1883.

In the direction of the Rialto Bridge, you can see, half hidden, the facade of the church of San Bartolomeo ex San Demetrio (12th century).

The campo is located between important places such as Campo San Salvador, the Rialto Bridge, and the Fondaco dei Tedeschi. If you go in this direction you can reach the Strada Nova and from there almost directly to the train station.
