= Church of San Stin =

Former church in Venice, Italy

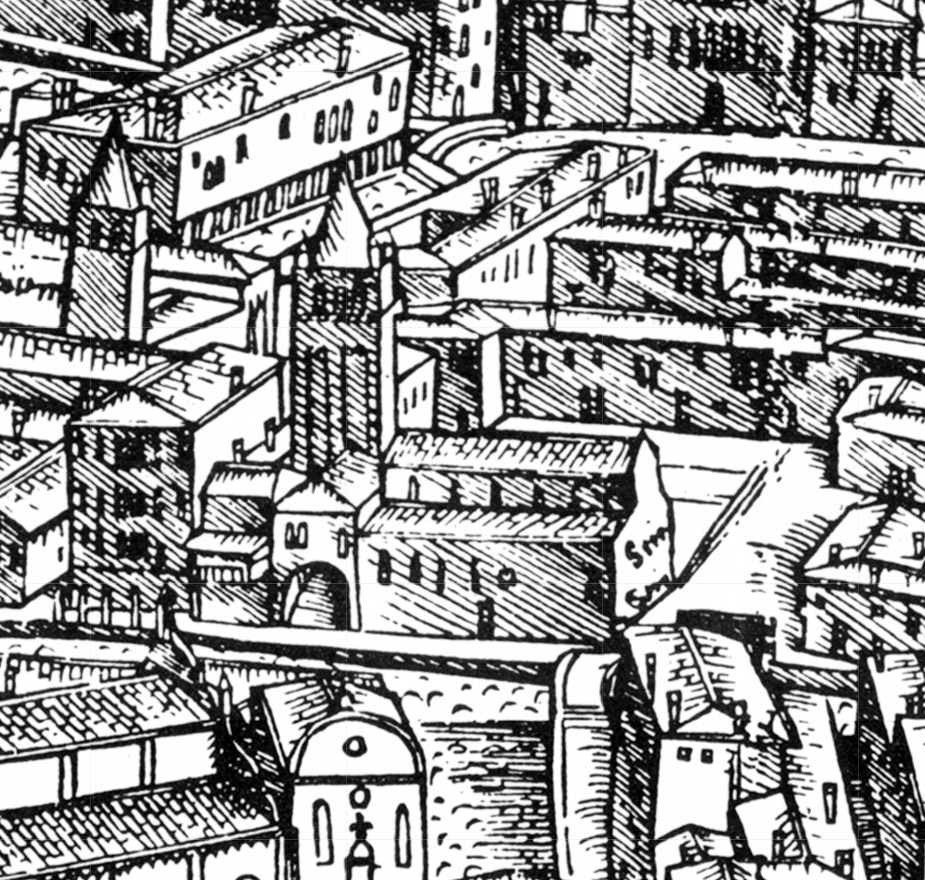
- Church of San Stin seen in View of Venice by Jacopo de' Barbari

Location
- Location: Venice
- Country: Italy
- Interactive map of Church of San Stin
- Coordinates: 45°26′16.4″N 12°19′36.8″E

The Church of San Stin was a church located on the current site of Campo San Stin, in the San Polo sestiere of Venice, Italy.

== History ==
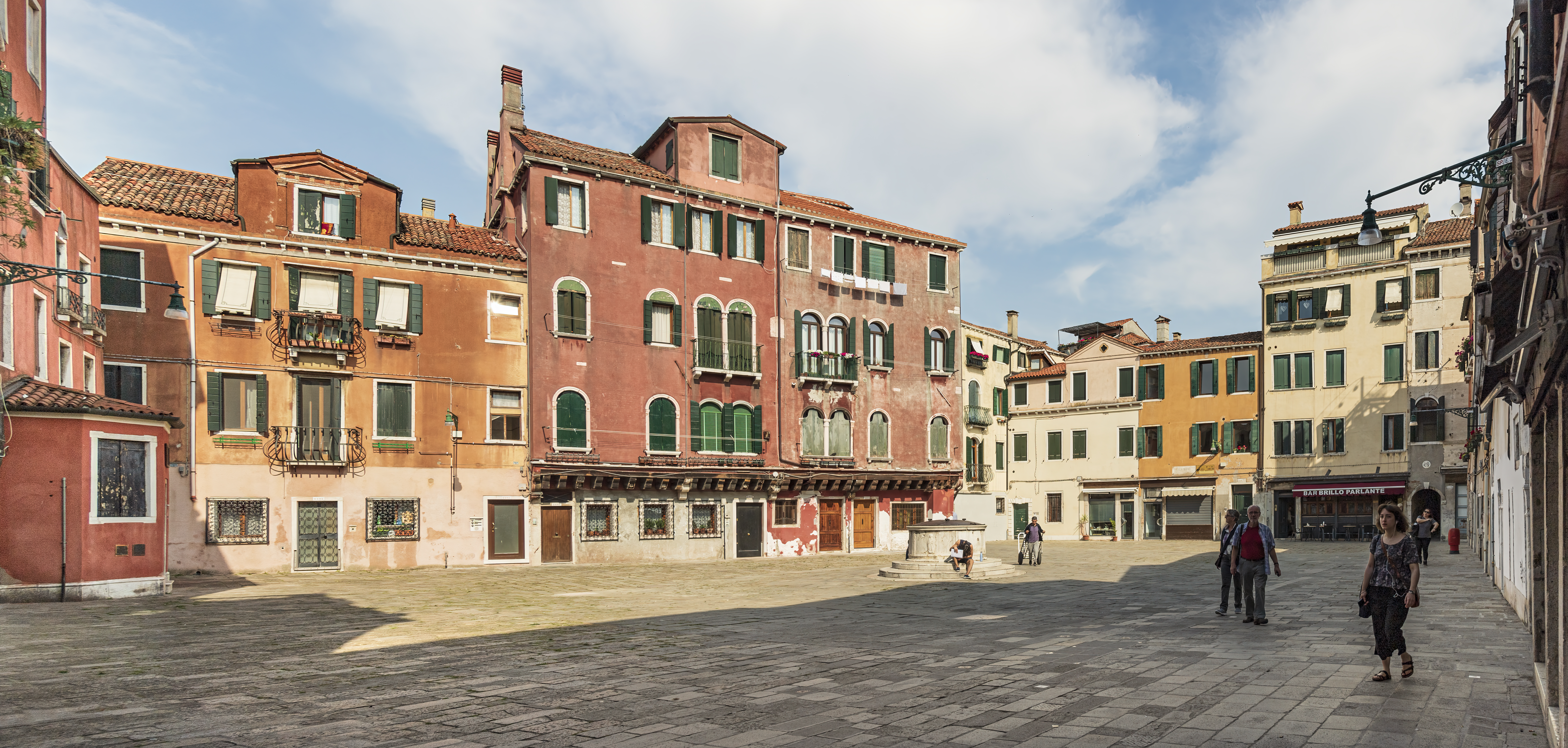
Campo San Stin in 2017

The church was dedicated to Saint Stephen the Confessor (possibly referring to Stephen the Younger as Venetian merchants who frequently travelled to Constantinople would have heard of his deeds), referred to as San Stefanino to distinguish it from the larger church of Saint Stephen, and corrupted to San Stin. The first known reference to the church was recorded in Andrea Dandolo's chronicle, stating that the church was almost completely consumed by fire in 1105.

It was subsequently restored in the second half of the 13th century by Giorgio Zancani, a venetian noble from Crete.

The church contained a painting by Tintoretto of the Assumption of the Virgin which is now located in the Gallerie dell'Accademia.

The church finally closed in 1810 during the Napoleonic suppression of Italy and the territory of the parish was incorporated into the parish of Santa Maria Gloriosa dei Frari and was demolished shortly afterwards, though the remains of the bell tower remain. The former site of the church is now a square called Campo San Stin, named after the church. Italian artist Bernardo Bellotto created a painting of the square.

== See also ==
- List of churches in Venice
