= Scuola dei Varoteri =

Coordinates: 45°26′02″N 12°19′25″E

The Scuola dei Varoteri is a building located facing the Campo Santa Margherita in the sestiere of Dorsoduro, Venice, Italy.

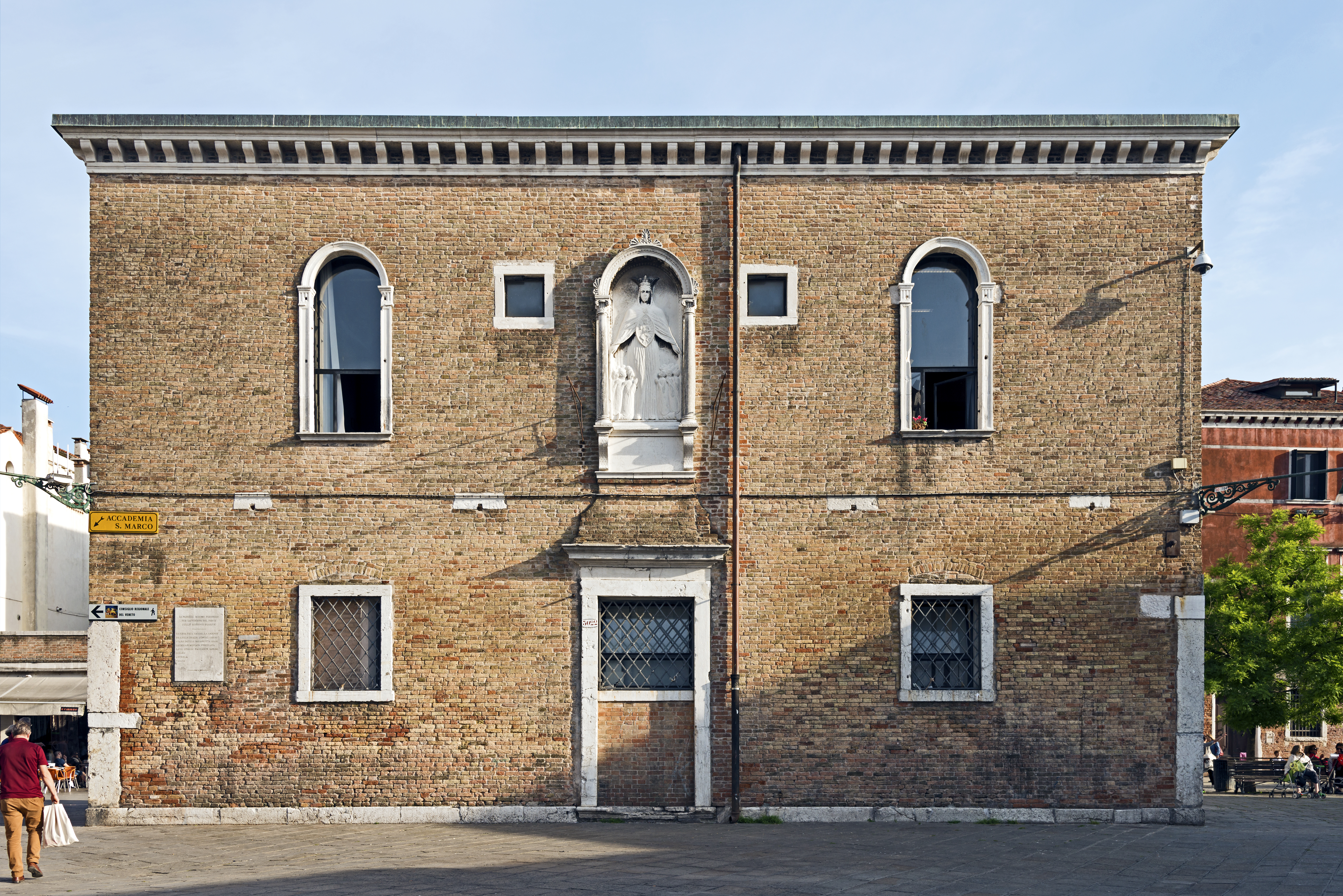
North facade of the structure on the Campo

== History ==
The two story brick building is unusual for standing detached in the large square. It served as the home of the confraternity of the tanners and furriers, founded in 1311, and who had moved from Cannaregio to this location in 1725. It was thus the home of one of the nearly 400 scuola minori or piccole that once existed in the city. In the 19th and 20th century it served as a store for firewood, movie theater, and fascist education hall.

On the second floor is a marble relief of the Madonna della Misericordia (1501), which was once attached to the guild's church.
