= Campo della Salute =

Square in Venice, Italy

Coordinates: 45.43087°N 12.33528°E

- Campo (Square)
- Location: Venice, Italy
- Interactive map of Campo della Salute

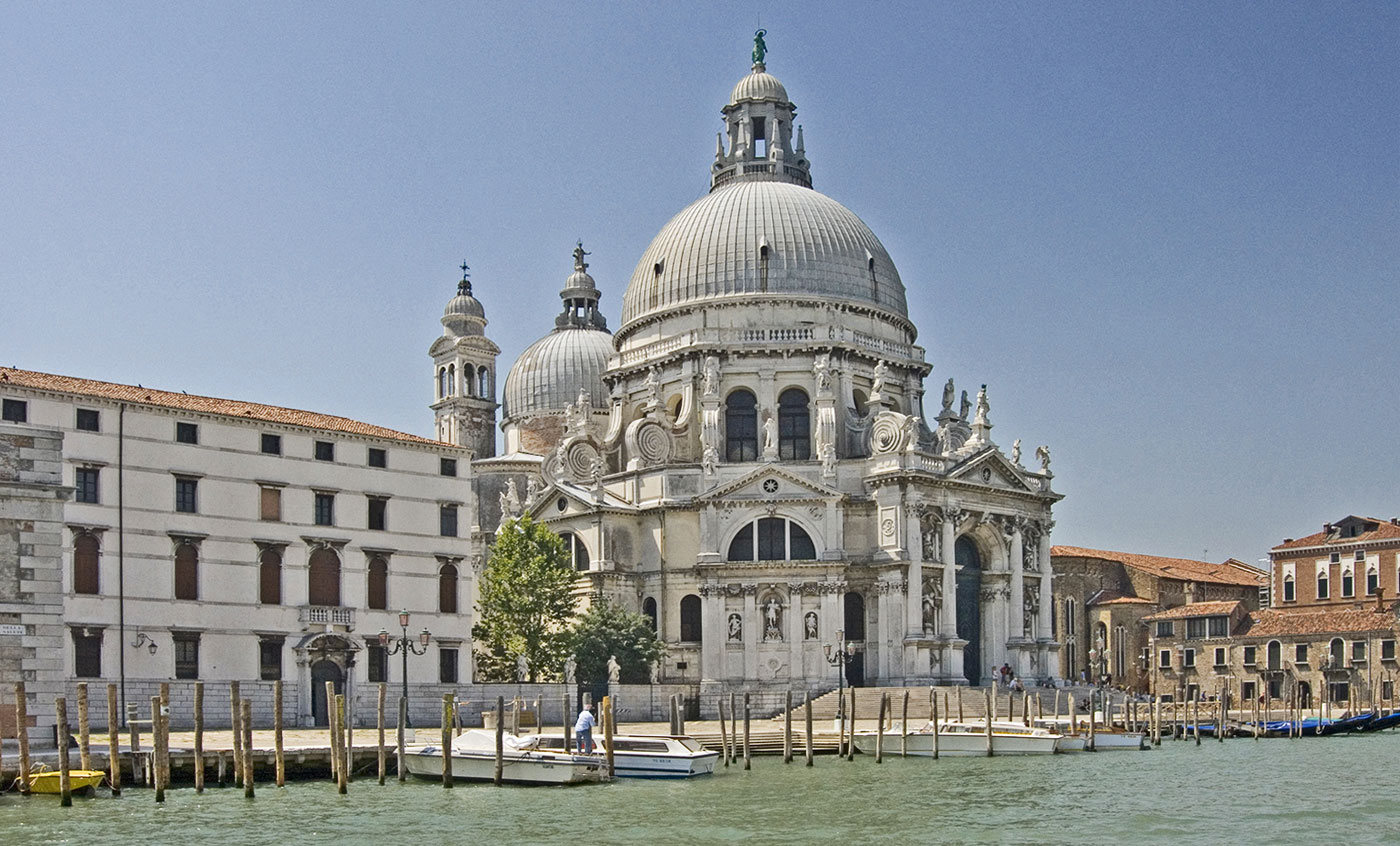
Campo della Salute

Campo della Salute is a city square in Dorsoduro, Venice, Italy. It has long been a tourist destination because of its scenic location at the point at the eastern end of the Grand Canal.

== Buildings around the square ==
- Punta della Dogana
- Santa Maria della Salute
