= Statue of Carlo Goldoni =

Monument in Venice, Italy

- Monumento a Carlo Goldoni
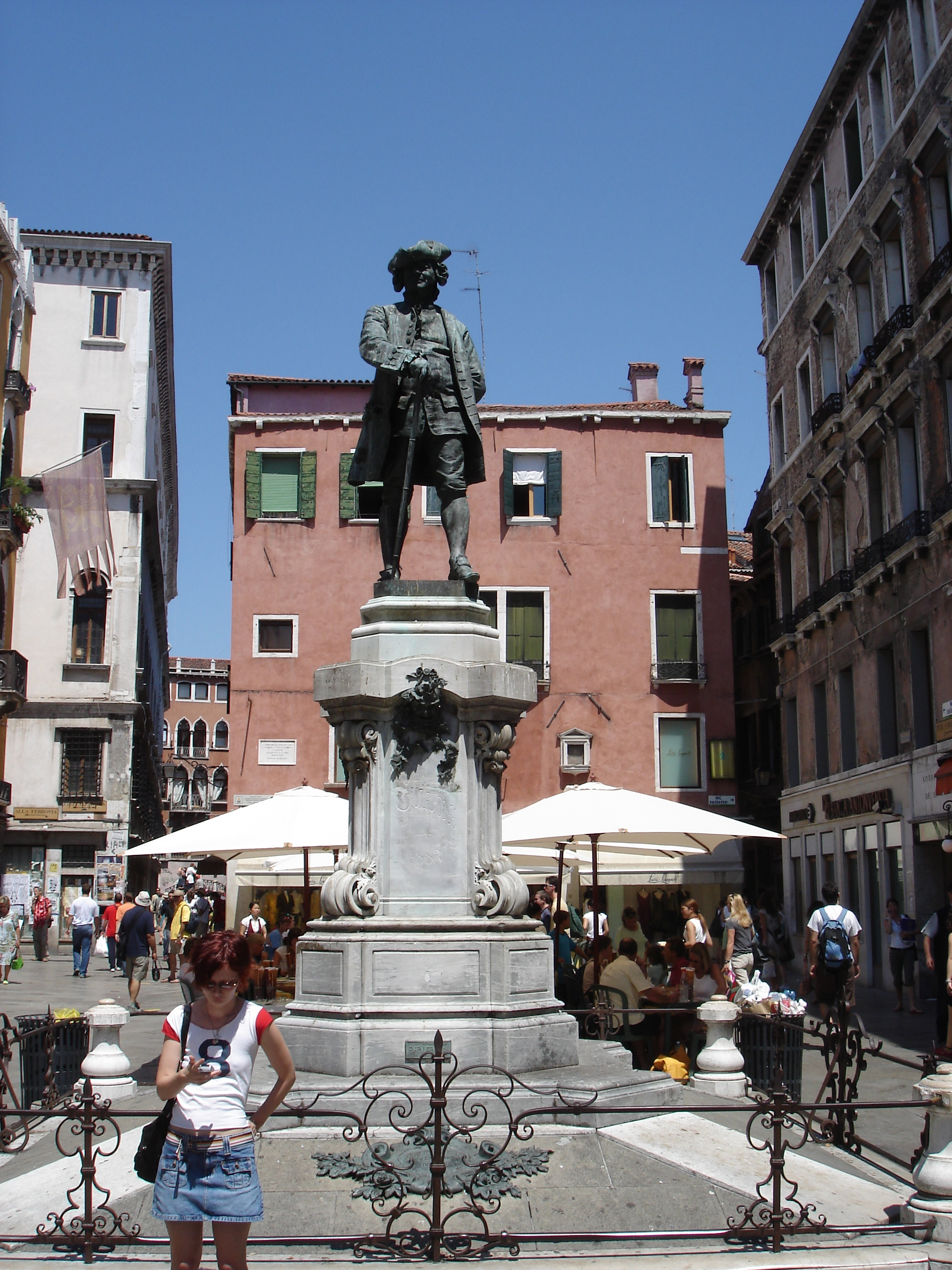
- Interactive map of Statue of Carlo Goldoni
- Location: Campo San Bartolomeo, Venice, Italy
- Designer: Antonio Dal Zòtto (sculptor); Pellegrino Orefice (pedestal architect)
- Type: Statue
- Material: Bronze (statue); Marble (pedestal)
- Dedicated date: 1883
- Dedicated to: Carlo Goldoni

A bronze statue of Venetian playwright and librettist Carlo Goldoni is installed in Campo San Bartolomeo, Venice, Italy. Designed by Italian artist Antonio Dal Zòtto, it was erected in 1883 and rests on a marble pedestal designed by the architect Pellegrino Orefice.

== See also ==
- List of public art in Venice
