= Campo del Ghetto Novo =

Square in Venice, Italy

- Campo (Square)
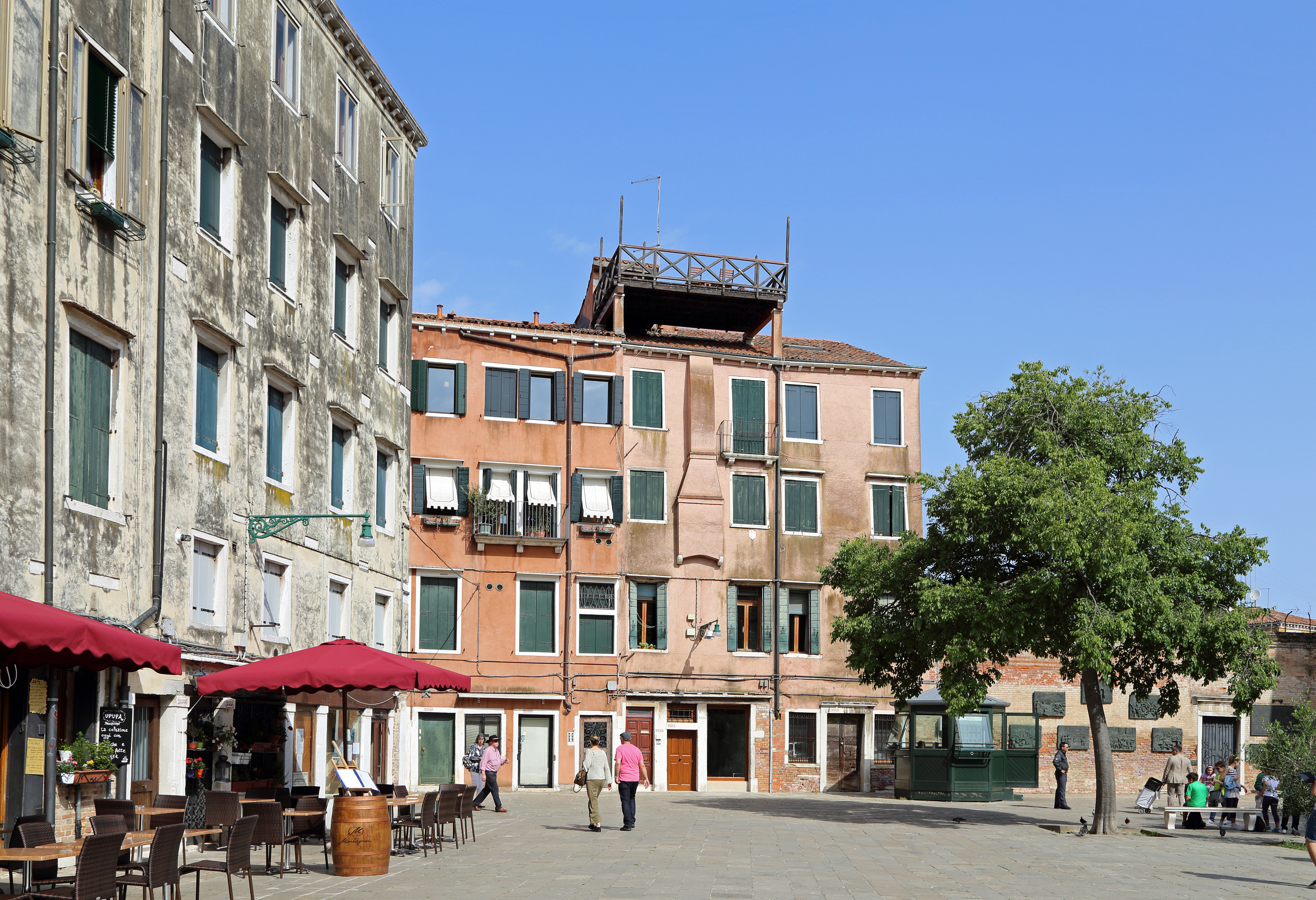
- Location: Venice, Italy
- Interactive map of Campo del Ghetto Novo

Campo del Ghetto Novo is a square in Venice, Italy. It has been described as a religious and commercial hub.
