= Campo San Luca =

Square in Venice, Italy

- Campo (Square)
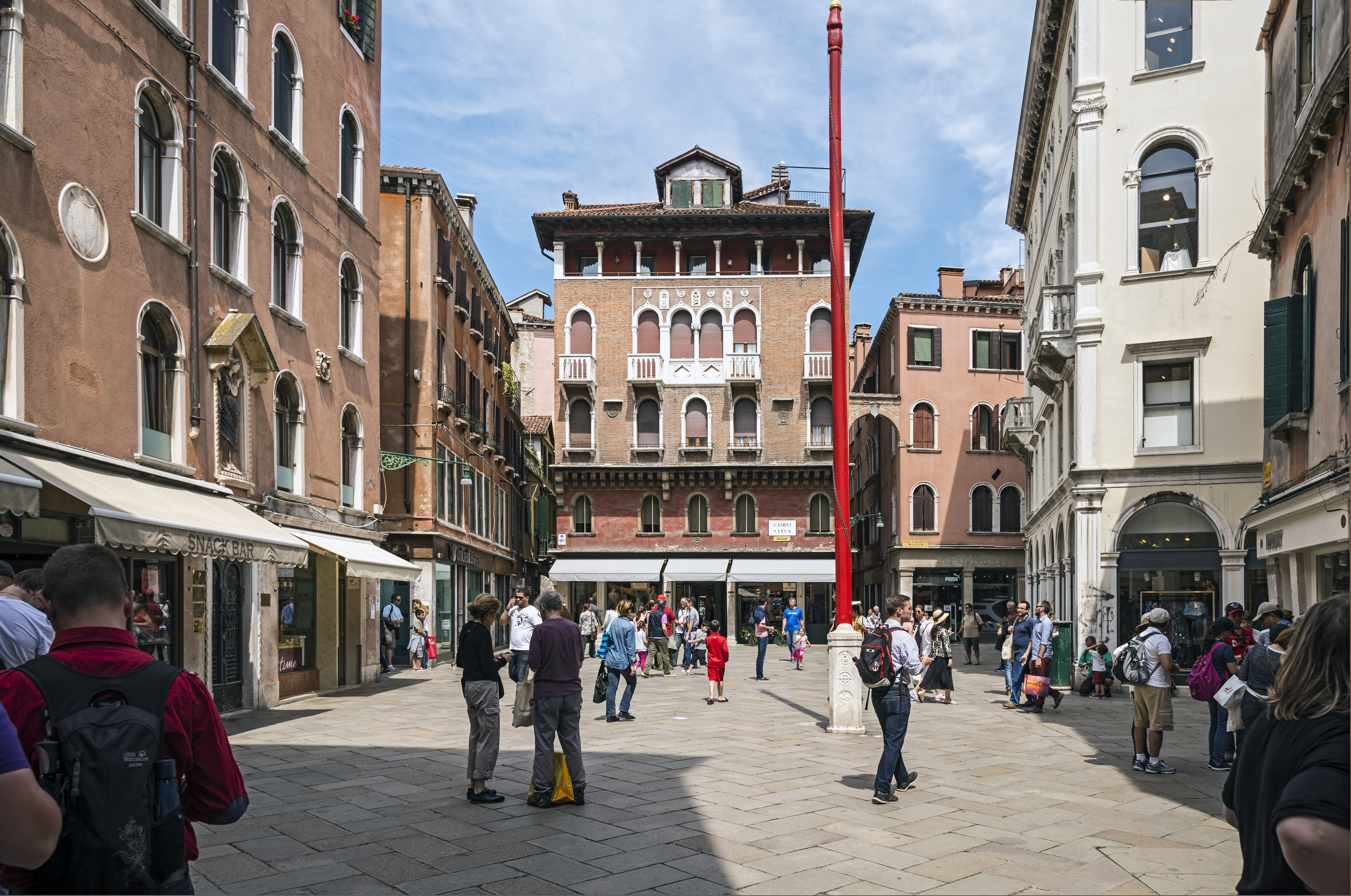
- Location: Venice, Italy
- Interactive map of Campo San Luca

Campo San Luca is a square in Venice, Italy.
