= Santa Margherita, Venice =

Church in Venice, Italy

Santa Margherita
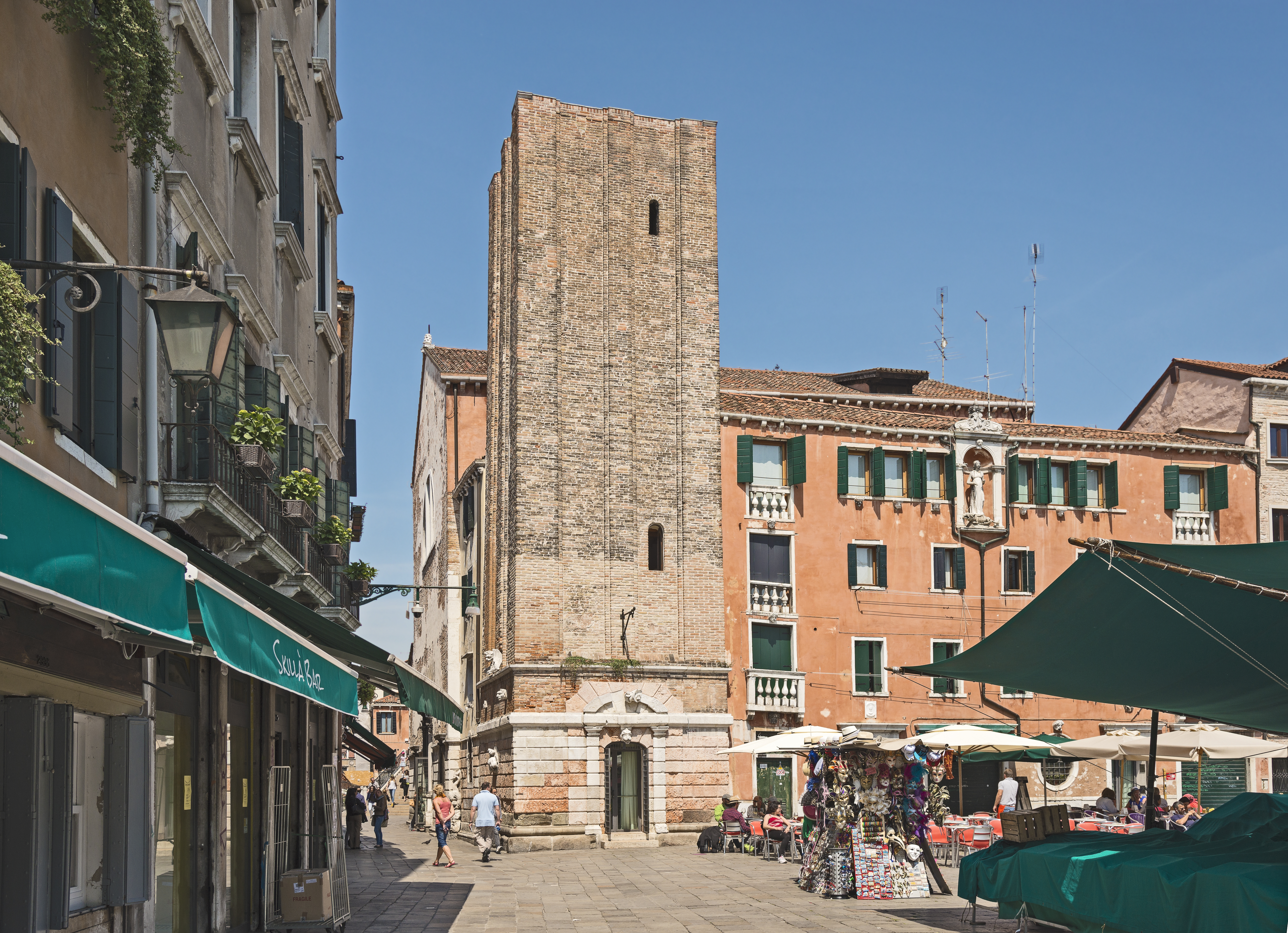

- Location within Venice Location within Italy

Religion
- Affiliation: Roman Catholic
- Province: Venice

Location
- Location: Venice, Italy
- Coordinates: 45°26′06″N 12°19′27″E

Santa Margherita (Italian: Chiesa di Santa Margherita) is a deconsecrated church in Venice, Italy.

The church was built in the 9th century, and deconsecrated in 1810. Since the early 19th century, the building has been repurposed multiple times, including as a tobacco factory and a cinema. It currently houses the Auditorium Santa Margherita, one of the buildings of the Ca' Foscari University of Venice. The church was named after Saint Margaret of Antioch.
