= Campo Santa Margherita =

Square in Venice, Italy

Coordinates: 45°26′04″N 12°19′26″E

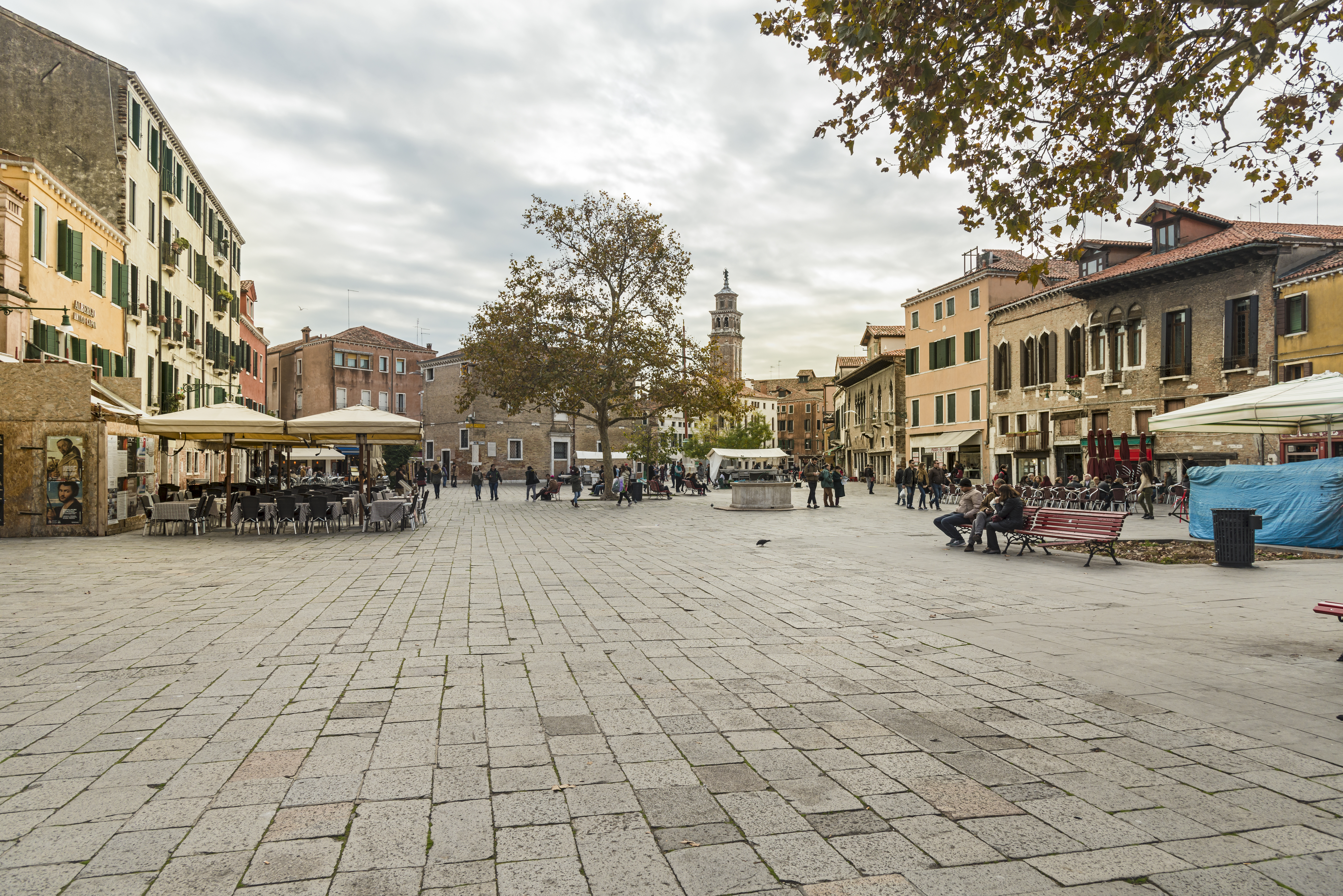
Campo Santa Margherita

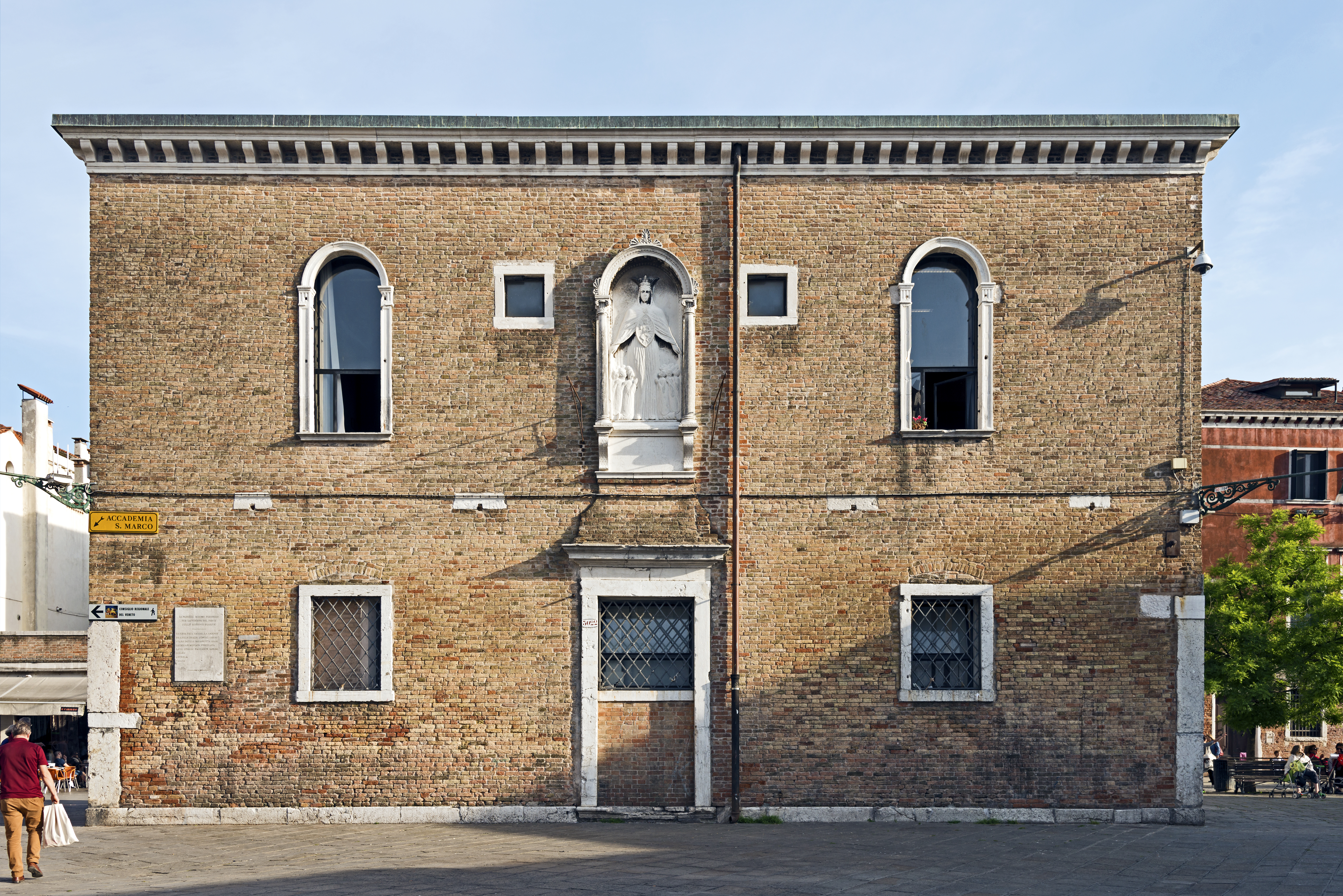
La Scuola dei Varoteri

Campo Santa Margherita is a city square in the sestiere of Dorsoduro of Venice, Italy.

It is located near university buildings and serves as a gathering place for students at the end of the day. Historically, the square had been host to various shops catering to local residents, but these have been replaced with bars, cafes and eateries catering to students and younger tourists.

With a total area of 8,045 m², the square has an oblong shape. The main alleyways leading to Campo Santa Margherita are located in the north and the south, but there is access at the midway as well.

== History ==
Campo Santa Margherita was a hotbed of left-wing activism in Venice in the 19th and early 20th century, being the home of the local headquarters of the Italian Socialist Party as well as the Casa del Popolo (the People's House). The osterie in the square were frequented by radical activists. In one instance, in 1913–14, socialists gathered at the Osteria da Capon declared the "Republic of Santa Margherita", a tongue-in-cheek act whereby they appointed fishermen as doges and port workers as avogadori. The area was not, however, exclusive to socialists and was a mixing ground for Venetians of different social backgrounds, including anti-socialist figures like Piero Foscari and Pietro Marsich, who lived locally spent time in the square's bars. The left-wing activism around the square was subdued with the rise of fascism; concurring with the March on Rome, fascists attacked the Casa del Popolo on 30 October 1922, to find only two socialists in house with orders not to resist.

== Buildings around the square ==
- Scuola dei Varoteri
- Ospizio Scrovegni
- Scuola Grande dei Carmini
- Santa Margherita, Venice
- Santa Maria dei Carmini
