= Campo San Trovaso =

Coordinates: 45.43062°N 12.32559°E

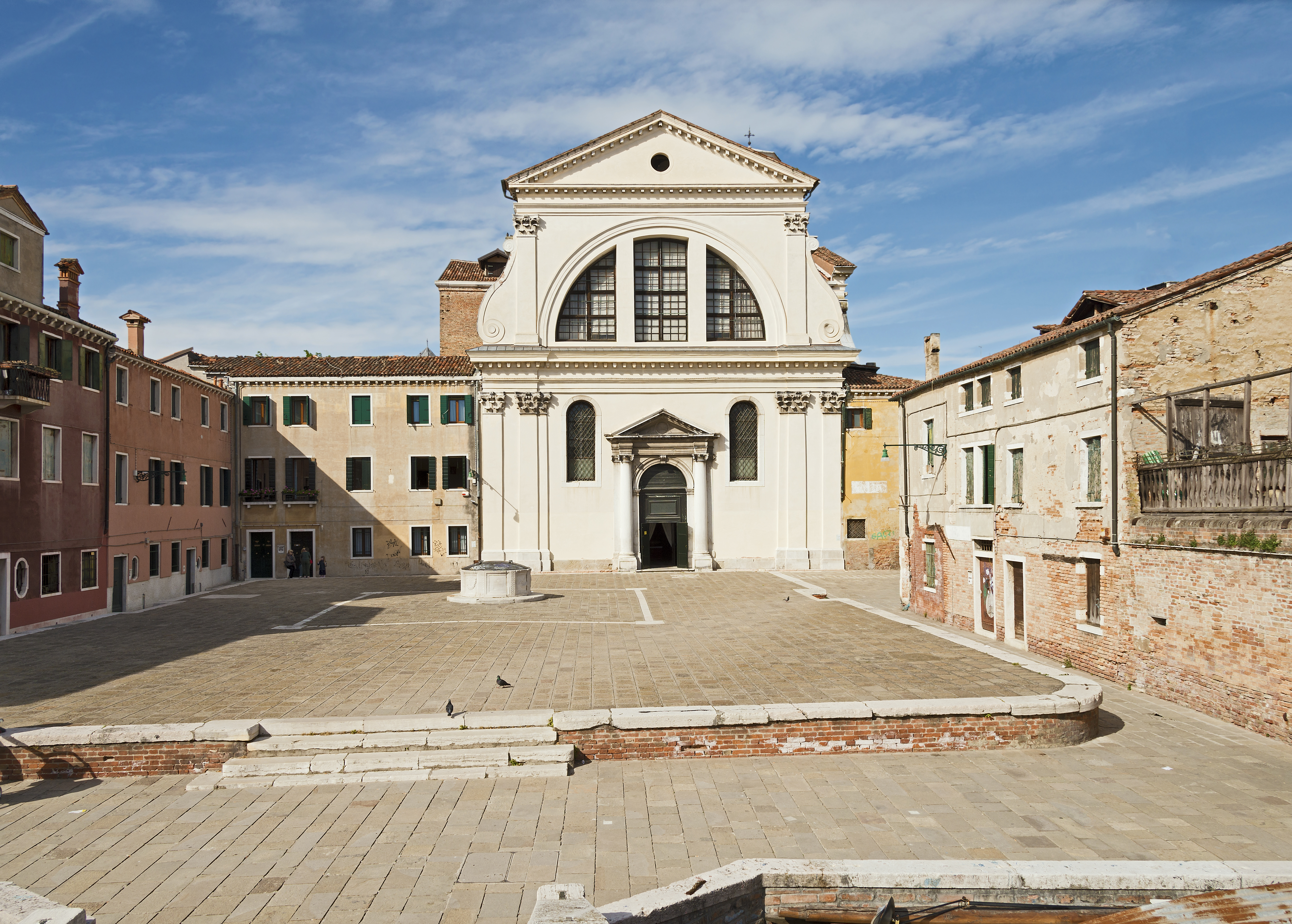
Campo and church San Trovaso

Campo San Trovaso is a city square in Venice, Italy.

== Buildings around the square ==
- San Trovaso
- Palazzo Barbarigo Nani Mocenigo
- Squero di San Trovaso
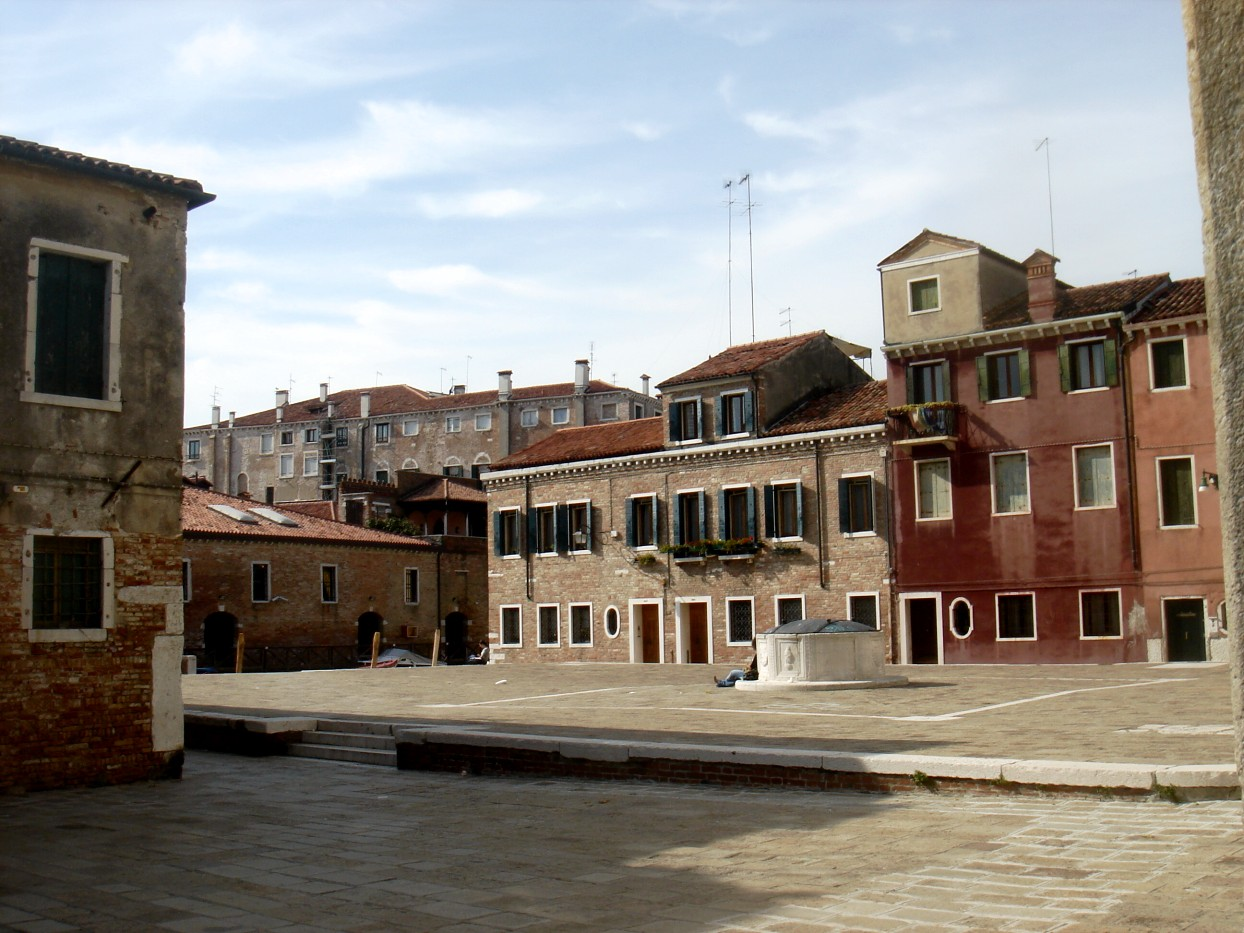
Campo San Trovaso

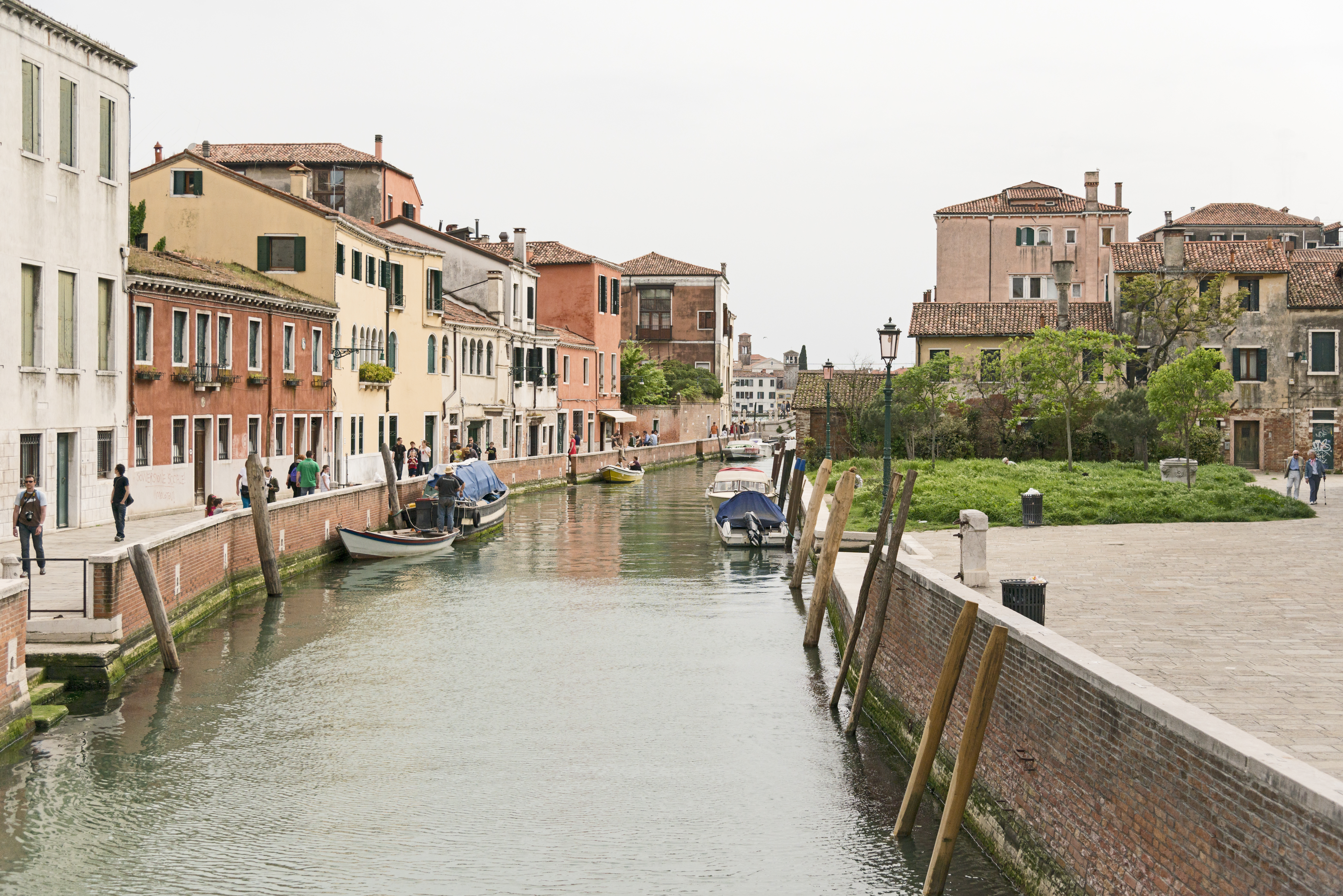
Rio and Campo San Trovaso

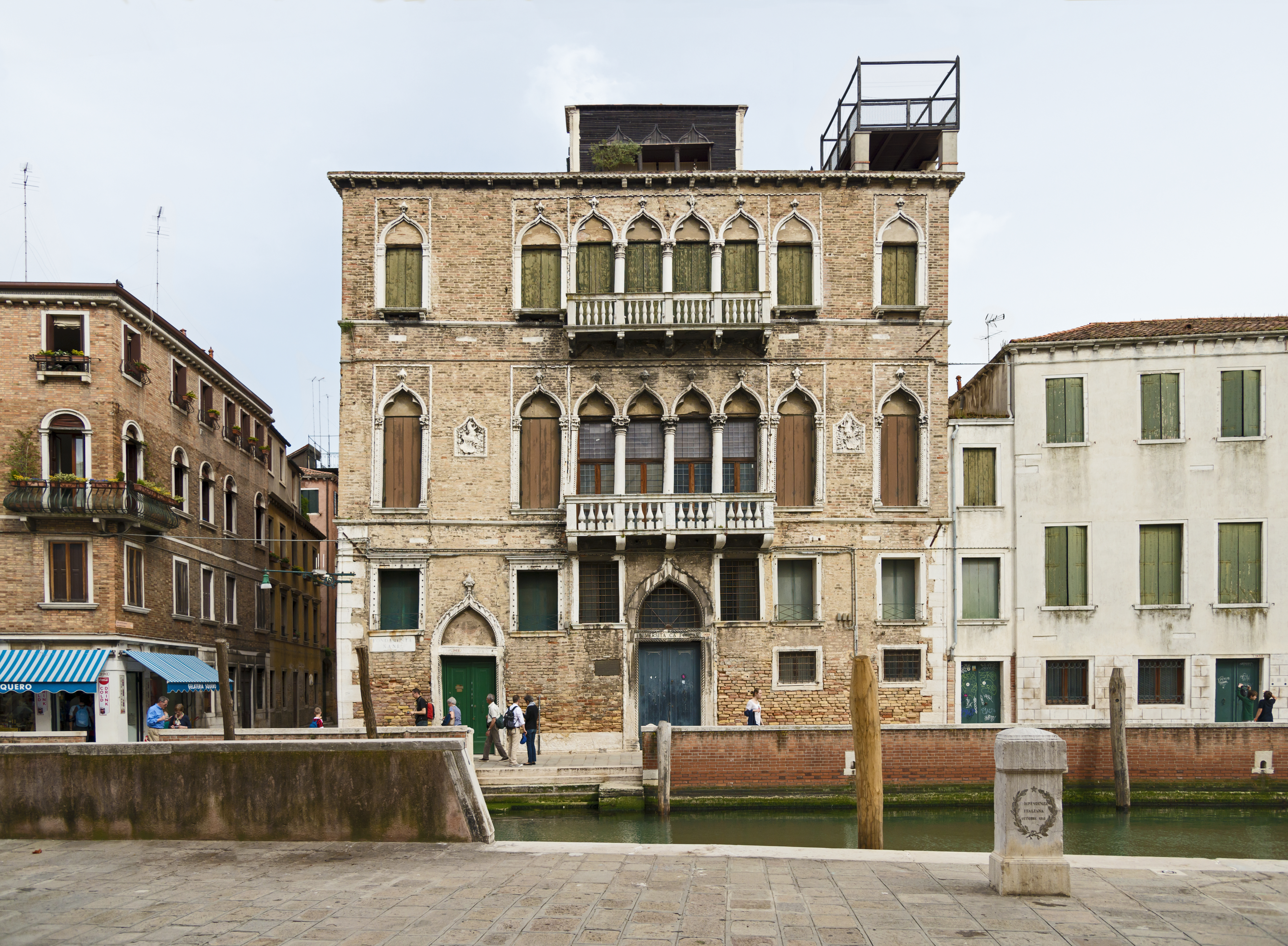
Palazzo Barbarigo Nani Mocenigo

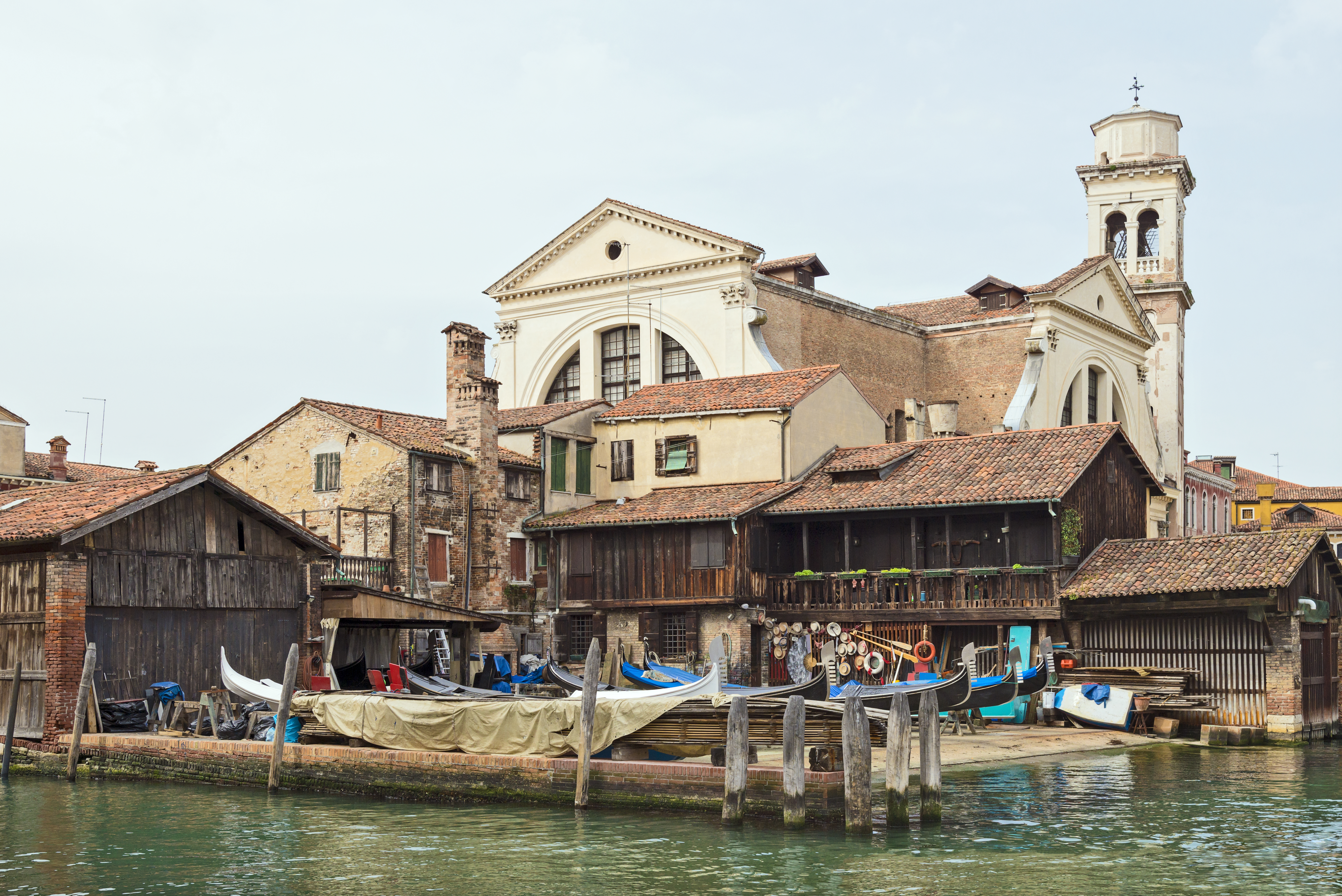
Squero di San Trovaso
