= Calimani =

Calimani is a surname. Notable people with this surname include:

- Attilio Calimani, Italian inventor who patented the French press
- Simchah ben Abraham Calimani (1699–1784), Venetian rabbi and author
- Riccardo Calimani (born 1946) Italian writer and historian

== See also ==
- Caliman
- Kaliman (disambiguation)
