= Great German Synagogue =

Former Orthodox synagogue, now Jewish museum, in Venice, Italy

Ruri Tora
- Italian: Scuola Grande Tedesca
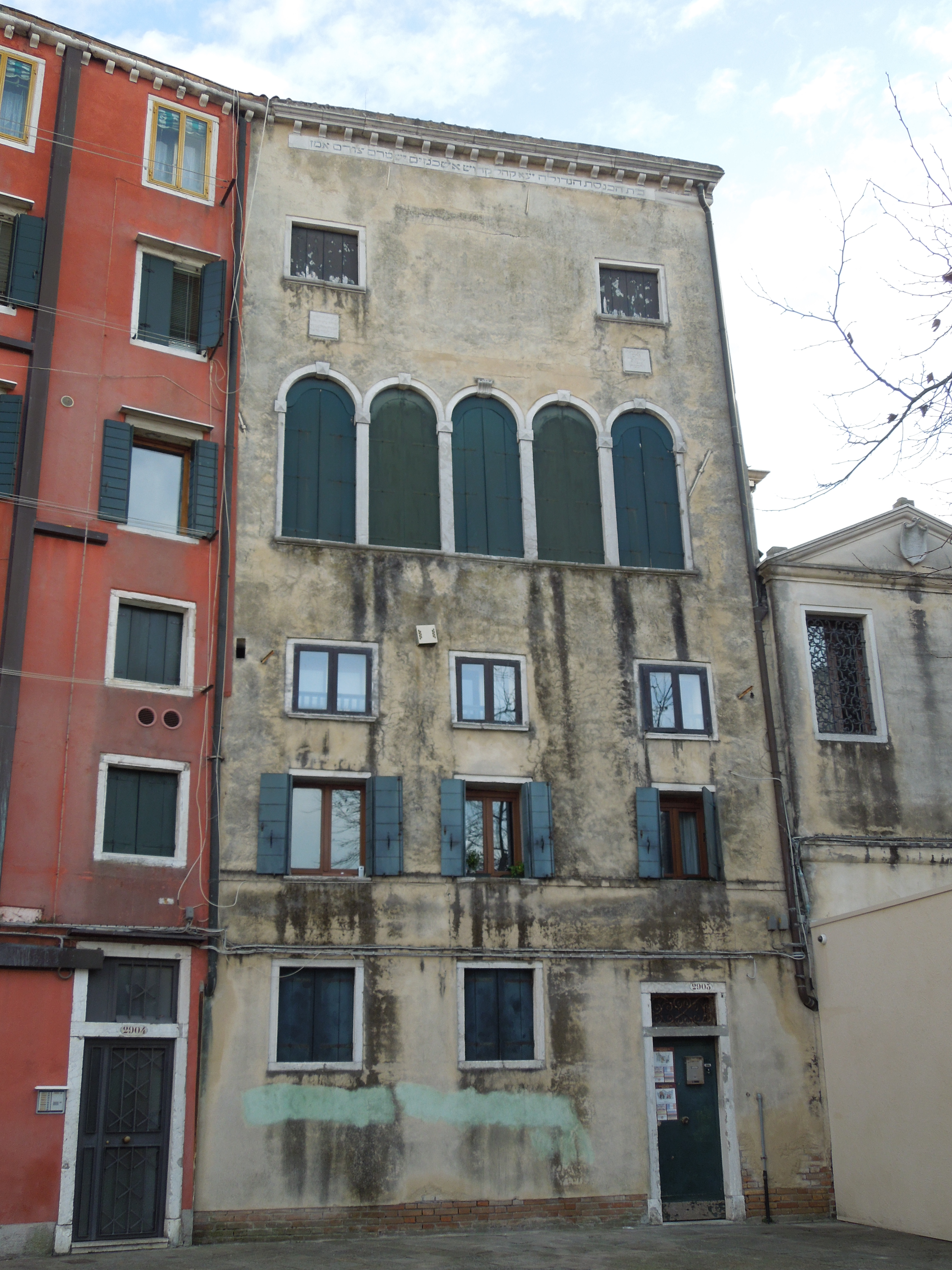
- The former synagogue, now Jewish museum, from the square of the Ghetto Nuovo, in 2017

- Location of the former synagogue in Venice

Religion
- Affiliation: Orthodox Judaism (former)
- Rite: Nusach Ashkenaz
- Ecclesiastical or organizational status: Synagogue (1528–1917); Jewish museum (since 2017)
- Status: Inactive (as a synagogue); Repurposed

Location
- Location: Jewish Ghetto, Venice
- Country: Italy
- Interactive map of Ruri Tora
- Coordinates: 45°26′42″N 12°19′37″E

Architecture
- Type: Synagogue architecture
- Completed: 1528
- Materials: Stone

The Great German Synagogue (Italian: Scuola Grande Tedesca) is a former Orthodox Jewish congregation and synagogue, that is located in the Jewish Ghetto of Venice, Italy. Completed in 1528, it is the oldest Venetian synagogue, and one of five synagogues that were established in the ghetto.

Ceased operating as a synagogue in 1917, the former synagogue building was restored between 2016 and 2017 by the World Monuments Fund. No longer used for regular worship, it is open to the public as a Jewish museum through the Jewish Museum of Venice.

== History ==
The Great German Synagogue is one of the three synagogues located in the Ghetto Nuovo (the oldest part of the Venetian Ghetto, established on 29 March 1516), together with the Scuola Canton and Scuola Italiana. It was built in 1528 by members of the local Ashkenazi community. A stone plaque on the west wall of the building records its construction at the expense of two donors. Like the other four synagogues in Venice, it was termed a scuola ("School"), rather than sinagoga ("Synagogue"), in the same way in which Ashkenazi Jews refer to the synagogue as the shul (שול) in Yiddish.

The Great German Synagogue was the first public synagogue erected in the Ghetto Nuovo. Together with the nearby Scuola Canton, completed in 1532, it stands as a testament to the influence of the Ashkenazi community in the early years of the Ghetto, before the arrival of the much more affluent Jewish merchants from Spain and the Levant in the 1550s.

Along with the other synagogues of Venice, it ceased to be regularly used in October 1917, when the local Jewish community was forced to disband; (Note: In the days of the Battle of Caporetto, many Venetian Jews were transferred to Livorno—another Italian city home to an important Jewish community—as a precaution against an Austro-Hungarian invasion.) at the same time, administration of all the Jewish places of worship was taken over by a single institution, the Templi Israelitici Uniti.

== Architecture ==
Built on top of a preexisting structure, the prayer hall features an irregular shape. The bimah was originally placed in the middle of the room in accordance with the traditional "central bimah" configuration, and only later moved to the north end of the sanctuary.

== Gallery ==
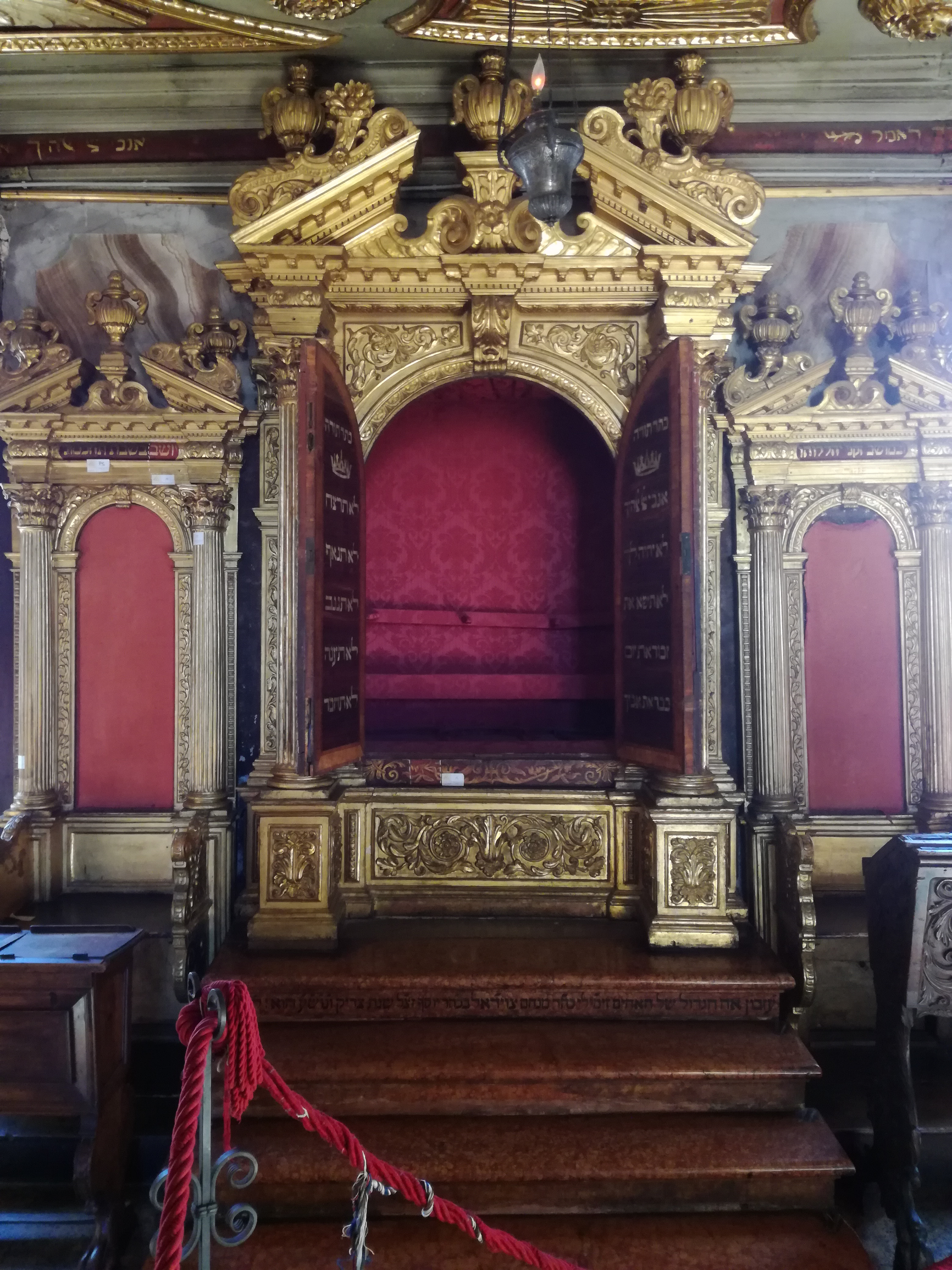
The ark

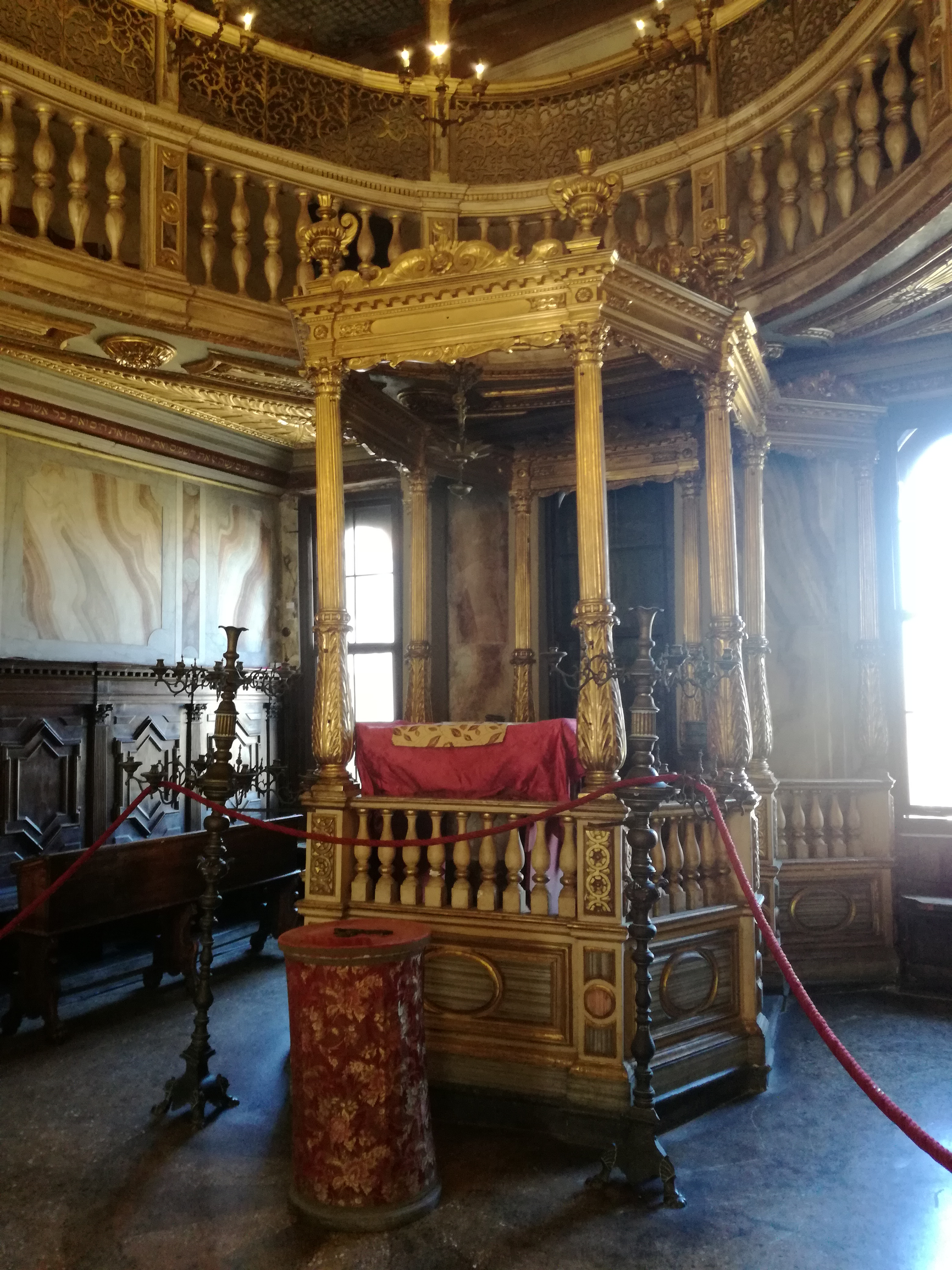
The bimah

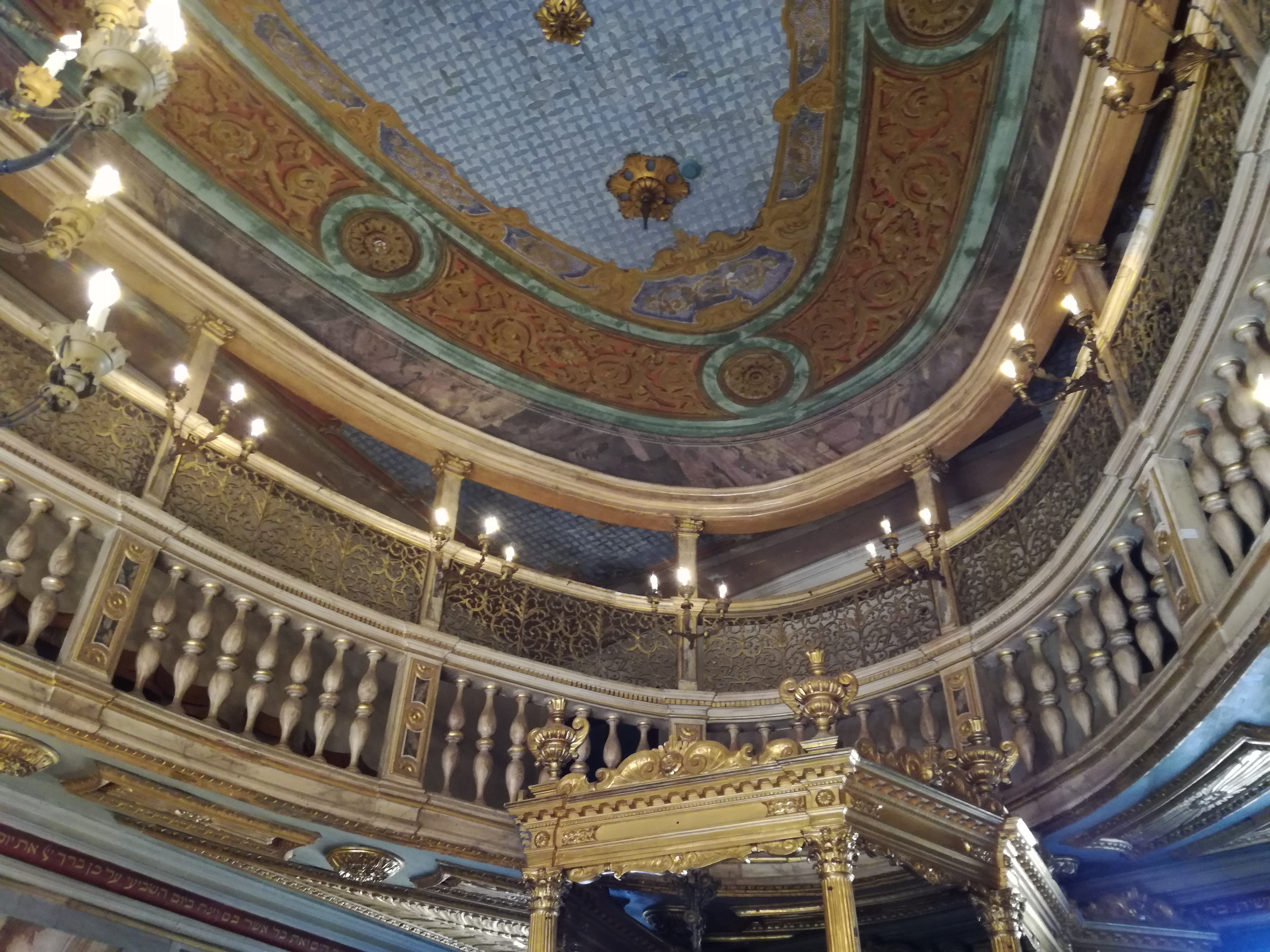
The women's gallery

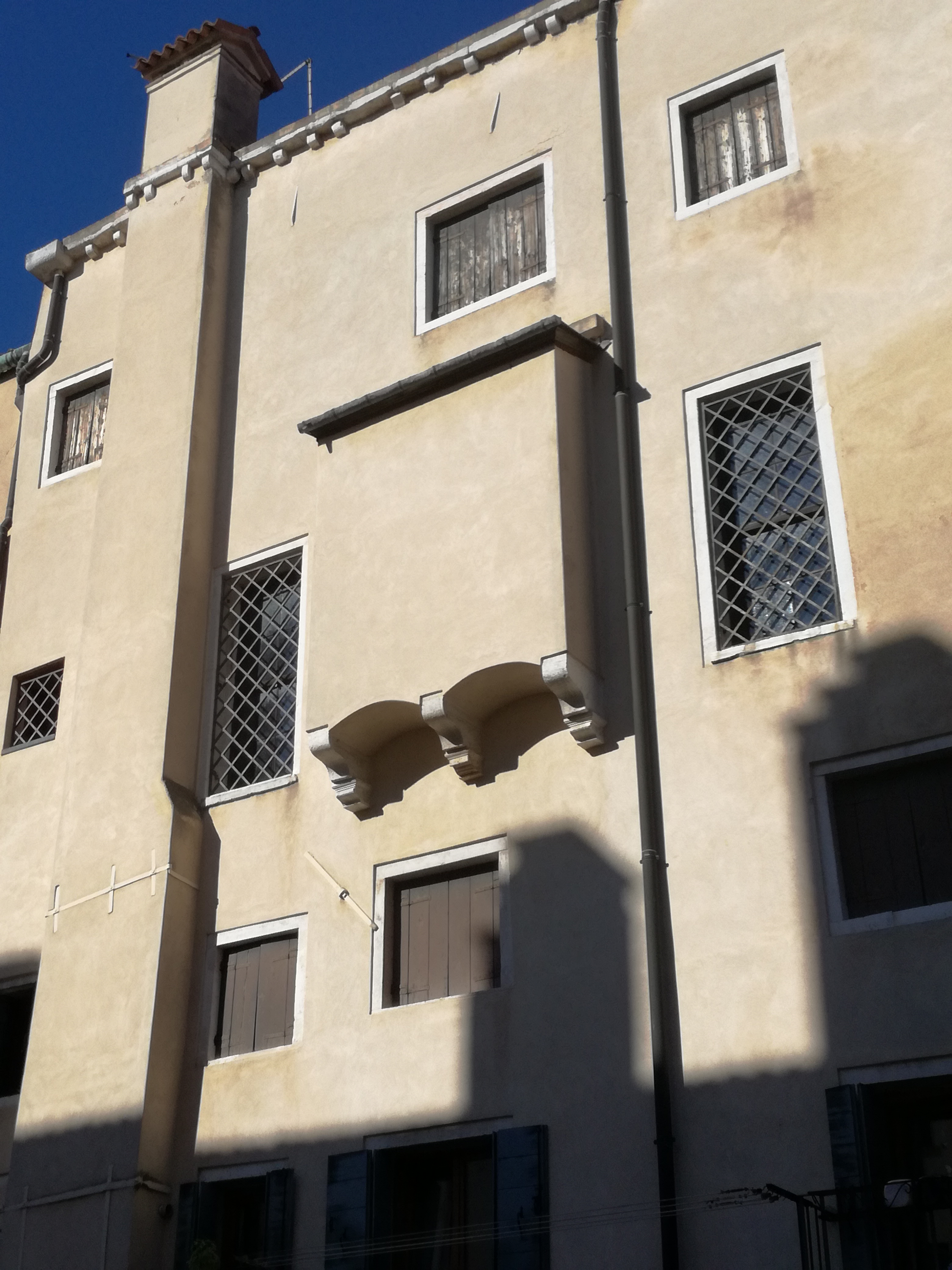
The ark projecting over the rear canal

== See also ==
- History of the Jews in Venice
- List of synagogues in Italy
