= Spanish Synagogue =

Spanish Synagogue may refer to:

- Spanish Synagogue (Prague)
- Spanish Synagogue (Venice)
