= Levantine Synagogue =

Sephardic synagogue in Venice, Italy

- Italian: Scola Levantina
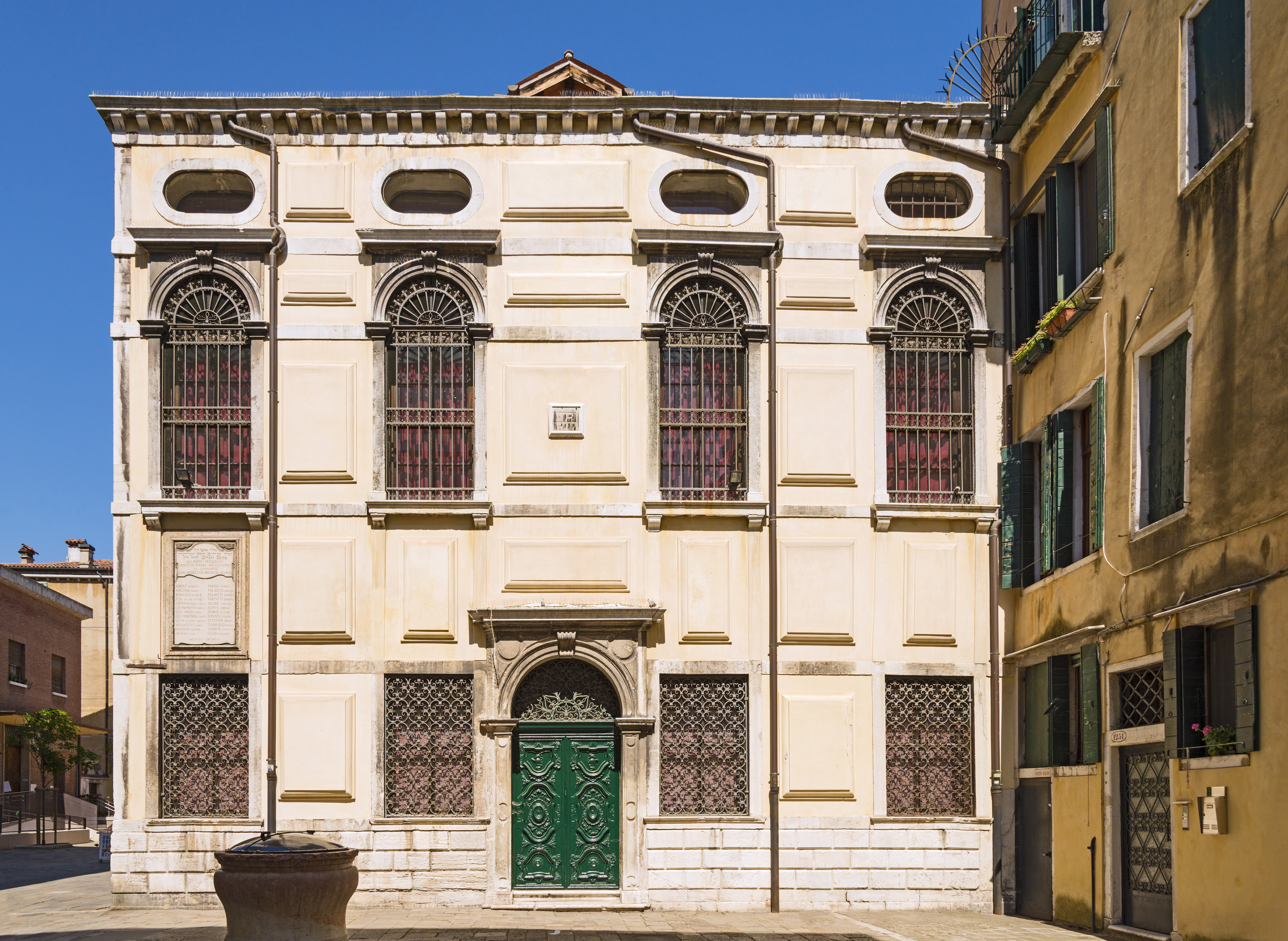
- The synagogue façade, in 2014

- Location of the synagogue in Venice

Religion
- Affiliation: Judaism
- Rite: Spanish rite
- Ecclesiastical or organizational status: Synagogue
- Status: Active

Location
- Location: Campiello delle Scuole, Venetian Ghetto, Venice, Veneto
- Country: Italy
- Interactive map of Levantine Synagogue
- Coordinates: 45°26′41″N 12°19′32″E

Architecture
- Architects: Baldassare Longhena; Andrea Brustolon
- Type: Synagogue architecture
- Style: Baroque; Mannerist
- Founder: Levantine Jews
- Completed: 1541
- Materials: Stone

The Levantine Synagogue (Italian: Scola Levantina) is a Jewish congregation and synagogue, that is located on Campiello delle Scuole, in the Venetian Ghetto of Venice, Italy. Designed by Baldassare Longhena and Andrea Brustolon in a mix of the Baroque and Mannerist styles, the synagogue was completed in 1541. The congregation worships in the Sephardic rite.

== History ==
The synagogue was founded in 1541, and underwent total reconstruction about a century later. It is believed that Baldassare Longhena worked on the exterior of the building, and Andrea Brustolon on the interior, specifically the pulpit. The Levantine Synagogue is so named due to its founders being Eastern Sephardim from the Ottoman Empire as well as the Venetian colony of Corfu in what is now Greece. The ancestors of these Levantine Jews came to the Ottoman Empire from Portugal and Spain.

The synagogue was extensively restored between 1976 and 1981.

== Description ==
The design of the synagogue is reminiscient of the Venetian Ghetto in the Cannaregio sestieri. The presence of the building is inconspicuous, as it is not well-accentuated on the outside. Only the windows, which are larger than a typical building's, stand out as different than the average dwelling, although the inside is far more intricate than the outside.

The synagogue is located in the Campiellio de le Scuole area of the Ghetto. Many external details are typical of Longhena's work, with a prominence of entablatures and volutes in the keystone, mirrored walls, the ashlar plinth, ovulate windows in the attic, and the doors' intricately carved decorations.

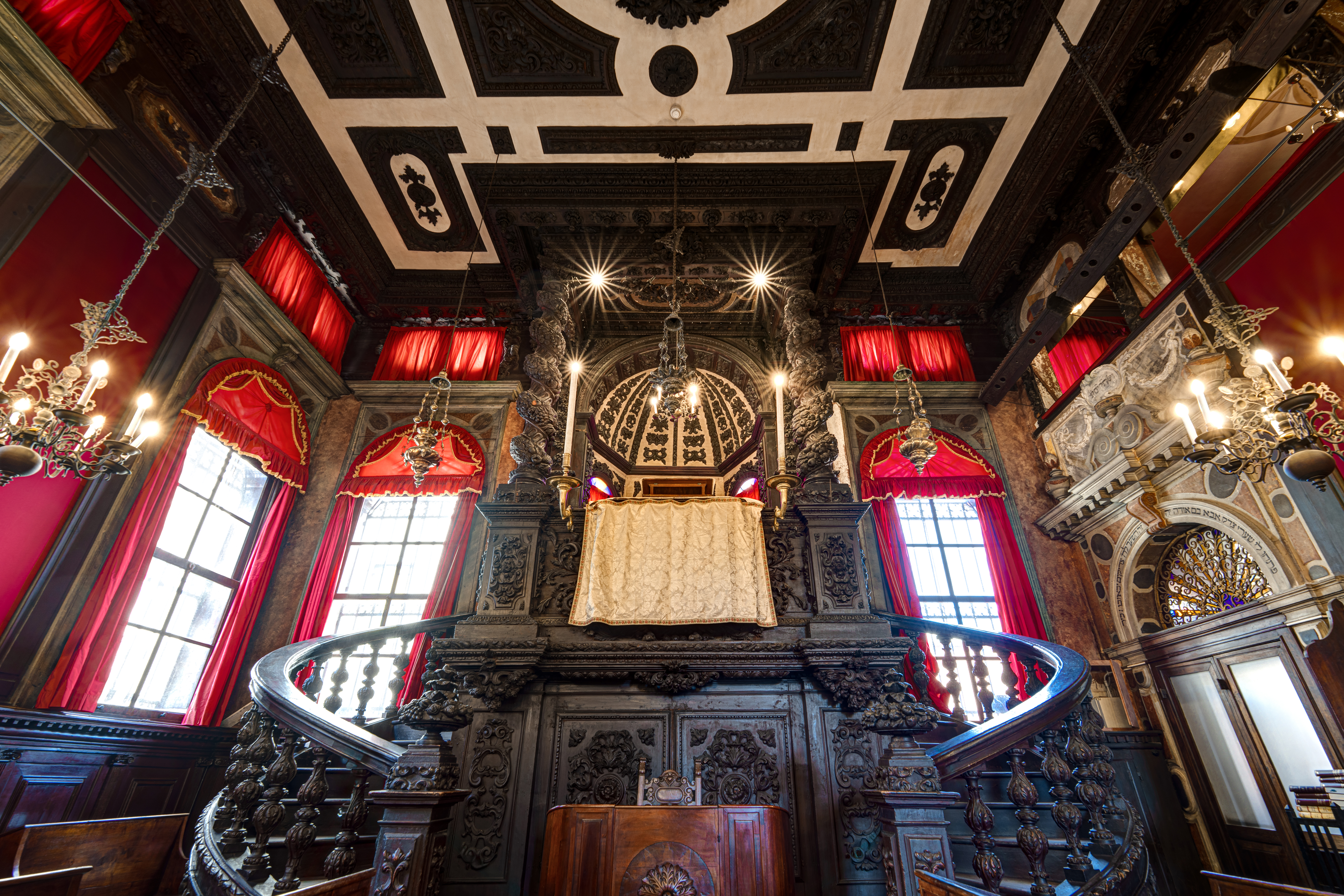
Interior of Levantine Synagogue

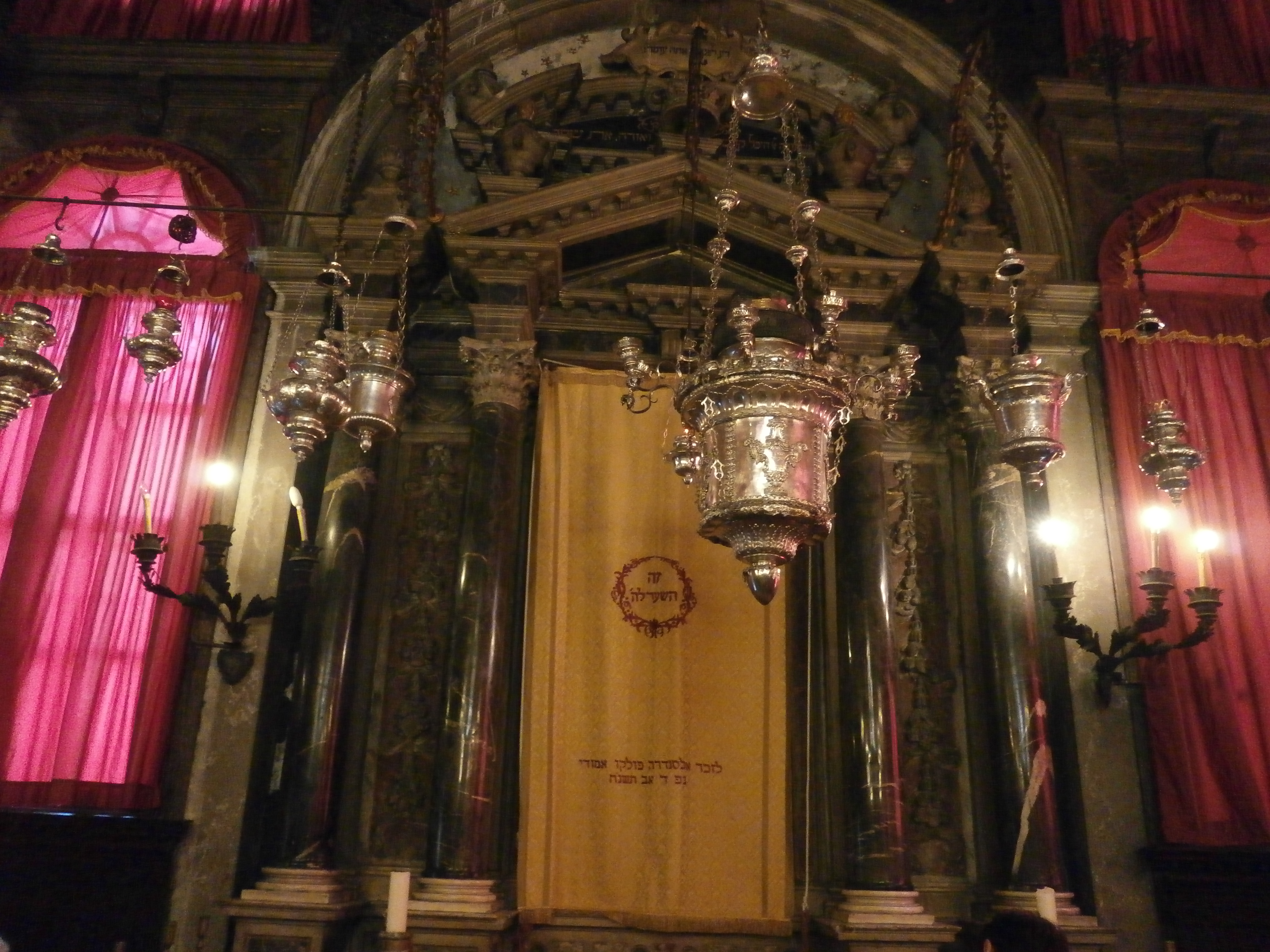
Interior of the synagogue

In contrast to the exterior, the interior is rich and refined. The floor contains the scola luzzatto, normally used as a study. Up the steps on the bimah, adorned with Solomonic columns with floral decorations, is the rabbi's lectern. The pulpit floor leads to three windows. Opposite to the bimah is the Aron haQodesh, engraved with the Ten Commandments, with the Hebrew date 5542, corresponding to the year 1782. A mechitza is visible and separates the higher women's gallery from the men's. On both sides, a boiserie covers the walls, depicting biblical narratives.

== See also ==
- History of the Jews in Venice
- List of synagogues in Italy
