= Klaus T. Steindl =

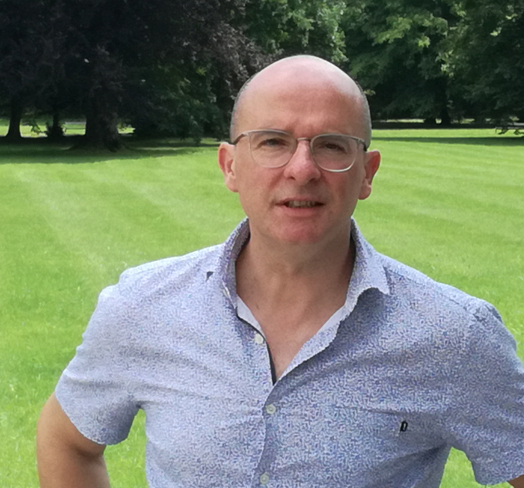
Image of Klaus Thomas Steindl

Klaus Thomas Steindl is an Austrian author, scriptwriter, director, and film producer. He owns the company KREATIVkraft e.U. His primary focus is on nature and investigative documentaries that deal with internationally relevant issues.

== Early life and education ==
Klaus Thomas Steindl was born in Austrial. He studied directing and stage design at the University of Music and Performing Arts in Graz. In 1987 his professor Wolfram Skalicki encouraged him to take on the role of assistant director to Lotfi Mansouri at Opéra de Nice (“Hérodiade”).

== Career ==
Steindl is an author, scriptwriter, director, and film producer.

After graduation, then worked as a freelance director for experimental theater performances before entering the field of film in 1991. After directing several award-winning commercials Steindl decided to focus on producing documentary films.

In 2017 the European art and culture broadcaster ARTE opened its one-week anniversary program "25 Years of ARTE" with the German/French premiere of Steindl's feature-film-length docu-drama "Venice and the Ghetto".

=== Promoting fresh talent ===
As well as producing and directing films, Klaus Steindl is involved with promoting and supporting young and new talents. He developed the educational concept and the first curriculum for the „Film und Medien Initiative“, a Graz-based film academy for children and adolescents. Furthermore, he was a member of the board of the Documentary Campus and a member of the commission for film funding in Styria, Austria, for several years. Over the years CINESTYRIA Film Commission has been successful in attracting large international film productions to the region. For example, several scenes from the James Bond film Spectre were shot at Styria's Altaussee lake.

=== Company ===
Steindl owns the company KREATIVkraft e.U.

=== Productions ===
In the course of his career Steindl has produced many documentaries. More than half of them were devised as international productions in several languages, produced with European and U.S. partners and broadcast around the globe. As well as producing wildlife and nature documentaries such ase Wild Venice, shown all over the world, Steindl focuses on investigative films that deal with internationally relevant historical themes. His research has frequently led to new scientific discoveries, most recently in Uncovering an Ancient Conspiracy and Lost City of Gladiators. For his film Vampire Princess, he discovered the historical inspiration for Bram Stoker's legendary Dracula character:

Picture a spectacular vampire attack at the tomb of an Austrian princess. A scene from Stephenie Meyer's "Twilight" series? No. It's the deleted opening to Bram Stoker's "Dracula," a horror classic that many experts believe was actually based on a woman. Archaeologists, historians, and forensic scientists revisit the days of vampire hysteria in the eighteenth-century Czech Republic and re-open the unholy grave of dark princess Eleonore von Schwarzenberg. They uncover her story, once buried and long forgotten, now raised from the dead.

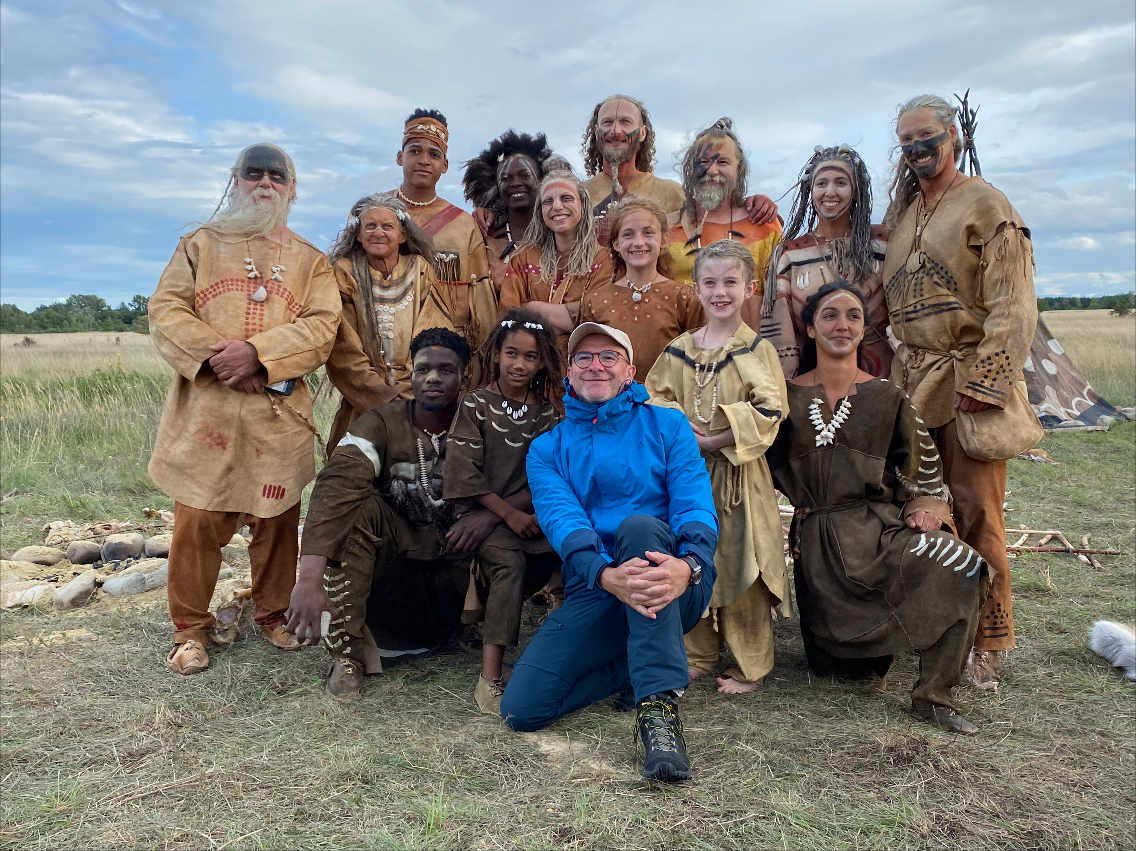

In his docudrama "Venus of Willendorf - The Naked Truth" the statuette of a naked woman provides a starting point for a ground-breaking scientific re-interpretation of the relationship between Stone Age men and woman (since Facebook banned the 29,500 years old artwork of the Stone Age for being "dangerously pornographic" the just 11 centimeteres tall statuette became an international celebrity).

Several of Steindl's works have been accepted into the libraries of European and U.S. universities. Many have been adapted for use in schools in a variety of forms and have received the European "Comenius EduMedia" Award for Educational Media.

The Miami Jewish Film Festival screened Steindl's film Rothschild Saga in its 2023 Official Selection, which was its North American premiere.

== Selected filmography ==
- 1994: From the "Etrich Taube" to the Mail Rocket - The history of Austrian aviation (with Niki Lauda)
- 1996: Signs of the Time - The history of writing
- 2000: The secrets of the gardens (with André Heller)
- 2000: Through the wild alps
- 2002: Tracking down composers
- 2006: Peter Rosegger - Forest farmer lad and revolutionary
- 2007: The Vampire Princess
- 2008: Let it snow!
- 2009: The Voynich-Code - The world's most mysterious manuscript
- 2012: The Secret of the Mona Lisa
- 2012: The Alps from above
- 2012: The Tulip Bubble
- 2013: The Mona Lisa Mystery
- 2014: Wild Venice
- 2014: Forest of Fantasies
- 2014: The Sword in the Stone
- 2014: Mysterious Schönbrunn
- 2015: Lake Constance - Wilderness on the Water
- 2015: Lost City of Gladiators - Carnuntum
- 2016: Margarethe Ottillinger - The woman who knew too much (with Ursula Strauss)
- 2016: Venice and the Ghetto
- 2017: The Nero Files - Uncovering an ancient conspiracy
- 2018: Mythos Hallstatt - Dawn of the Celts / Mystery of the Celtic Tomb
- 2021: Rothschild Saga. Rise – Riches – Repercussions (with Alina Fritsch)
- 2022: Venus of Willendorf - The Naked Truth
- 2023: The Golden Kingdom - The Normans in Sicily
- 2024: The Imperial Crown

== Awards and festivals ==
"The Imperial Crown"	World Media Festival 2025: "intermedia-globe gold", Category: Documentary
"The Rothschild Saga"	"Miami Jewish Film Festival 2023" "Vienna Jewish Film Festival 2022"
"Mystery of the Celtic Tomb"	’‘US International Film & Video Festival’‘ Category: Documentary-History
"Wild Venice"	"White Dolphin" (Grand Prix) Cannes Corporate Media & TV Awards 2015
"The Lagoon of Venice"	Comenius Award for educational media
‘‘The Mona Lisa Mystery’‘	’‘New York Festivals’‘ Gold Medal Award Category: Science & Technology
‘‘The Mona Lisa Mystery’‘	’‘US International Film & Video Festival’‘ Certificate for Creative Excellence
’‘The Tulip Bubble’‘	’‘New York Festivals’‘ International TV & Film Awards Bronze World Medal
’‘The Tulip Bubble’‘	’‘Prix Victoria’‘ in Gold Category: TV/Economy - Internationale Wirtschaftsfilmtage
’‘The Tulip Bubble’‘	’‘Cannes’‘ ‘‘Corporate Media & TV Awards’‘ Winner Category: Business & Economy
‘‘Let it snow!’‘	’‘Cine’‘ ‘‘Golden Eagle Award’‘
‘‘Let it snow!’‘	’‘Telenatura’‘ International Television Festival Pamplona
‘‘Let it snow!’‘	’‘International Wildlife’‘ Film Festival Montana
‘‘Let it snow!’‘	’‘Matsalu’‘ Nature Film Festival
‘‘Let it snow!’‘	’‘Bergfilmfestival’‘ Tegernsee
‘‘The Vampire Princess’‘	’‘Cine’‘ ‘‘Golden Eagle Award’‘
’‘The Voynich Code"‘	’‘US International Film & Video Festival’‘ Certificate for Creative Excellence
’‘The Voynich Code"‘	’‘New York Festivals’‘ International TV & Film Awards Silver World Medal
‘‘The Secret of the Mona Lisa’‘	’‘Prix Victoria’‘ in Silver Kategorie: Sponsoring, Non-Profit
‘‘Tracking down Composers’‘	’‘Comenius EduMedia’‘ Medal + Seal for educational media
’‘The European Parliament’‘	‘‘Comenius EduMedia’‘ Seal for educational media
‘‘The Austrian Parliament‘	‘‘Comenius EduMedia’‘ Seal for educational media
