= Simchah ben Abraham Calimani =

Venetian rabbi and author

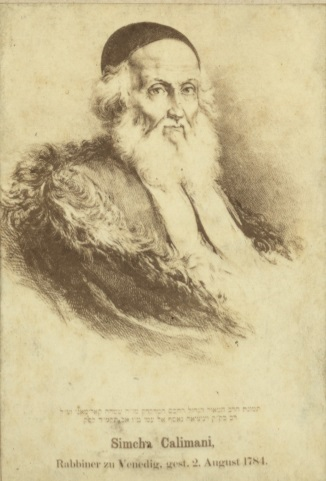
- Simchah ben Abraham Calimani

Personal life
- Born: 1699
- Died: August 2, 1784 (aged 84–85) Venice

Religious life
- Religion: Judaism

Simchah (Simon) ben Abraham Calimani (1699 – August 2, 1784) was a Venetian rabbi and author. He was a versatile writer, and equally prominent as linguist, poet, orator, and Talmudist. During his rabbinate Calimani was engaged as corrector at the Hebrew printing office in Venice. Among the great number of books revised by him was the responsum of David ben Zimra (RaDBaZ), to which he added an index, and the Yad Ḥaruẓim (on Hebrew versification) of Gerson Ḥefeẓ, enriched with interesting notes of his own.

Calimani was the author of the following works: (1) II Rabbino Morale-Toscano, an Italian translation of the Mishnah treatise Abot (in collaboration with Jacob Saraval, Venice, 1729, often reprinted); (2) Kelale Diḳduḳe Leshon 'Eber, a Hebrew grammar inserted at the end of the Bible, edited at Venice, 1739; (3) Grammatica Ebrea, an Italian translation of the preceding work, Venice, 1751; Pisa, 1815; (4) Ḳol Simḥah (Voice of Joy), an allegorical drama, with Jealousy, Folly, and Wisdom as the heroes, Venice, 1758; (5) a Hebrew-Italian dictionary, left unfinished.

Calimani was liberal in his religious views, and took part in the campaign directed by Wessely against the delivery of casuistic lectures (pilpul) in the synagogues.

== See also ==
- Riccardo Calimani
- Venetian Ghetto
