= Riccardo Calimani =

- Born: 1946 (age 79–80); Venice, Italy
- Occupations: essayist, historian
- Relatives: Rabbi Simone Calimani, 18th century
- Writing career
- Period: Middle Ages, Renaissance, Enlightenment, 1900
- Genres: Religious, historical

Riccardo Calimani (born 1946 in Venice, Italy) is a writer and historian, specialising in Italian and European Judaism and Jewish history.

A graduate of electronic engineering at the University of Padua and of Philosophy of science at the University of Venice, he worked many years a director of TV programmes at RAI for the Venetian Region.

Among his many works are Dialogo sull'ebraismo (Dialogue on Judaism) (1984), an updated edition of the book written by important Venetian Rabbi Simone Calimani (Simchah ben Abraham Calimani, an ancestor of his), who lived in the 18th century; The Ghetto of Venice (Costantino Pavan Prize), Ebrei e pregiudizio (Jews and Prejudice) (2000), Storia dell'ebreo errante (A History of the Wandering Jew) (2002), L'Inquisizione a Venezia (Inquisition in Venice) (2002), Non è facile essere ebreo (It's Not Easy To Be A Jew) (2004), Passione e tragedia (Passion and Tragedy) (2006), Ebrei eterni inquieti (Jews, Eternally Restless) (2007). In 1986 he received the Prize for Culture from the Italian Parliament and in 1997 the European Prize for Culture.

Currently, he is the vice president of the Jewish Community of Venice and Honorary Swiss Consul in Venice.

== Bibliography ==
- Ebrei eterni inquieti (Jews, Eternally Restless) (2007)
- Non è facile essere ebreo (It's Not Easy To Be A Jew) (2004)
- Passione e tragedia: La Storia Degli Ebrei Russi (Passion and Tragedy: The History of Russian Jews) (January 2006), 1st ed.
- Le Radici del Futuro : 1985–2005, I Protagonisti del Veneto (with Vittorio Pierobon) January 2005, 1st ed.
- Storia del ghetto di Venezia (1995)
  - The Venetian Ghetto (with Anna-Vera Sullam Calimani, Davide Calimani – January 2005)
- Storia dell'Ebreo Errante : Dalla Distruzione del Tempio di Gerusalemme al Novecento (A History of the Wandering Jew) (January 2002) 1st ed.
- L'inquisizione a Venezia : Eretici E Processi 1548–1674 (January 2002)
  - Venice : Guide to the Synagogues, Museum and Cemetery (with Cesare Vivante, Giovannina Sullam Reinisch) (January 2001) 1st ed.
- Ebrei e Pregiudizio : Introduzione alla Dinamica dell'Odio (Jews And Prejudice: Introduction to Hate Dynamics) (January 2000) 1st ed.
- Paolo: L'Ebreo che fondò il Cristianesimo (Paul: The Jew Who Founded Christianity) (January 1999) 1st ed.
- Capitali Europee dell'Ebraismo tra Ottocento e Novecento (January 1998), 1st ed.
- Le Vie Del Mondo : Berlino, Budapest, Praga, Vienna E Trieste Intellettuali Ebrei E Cultura Europea Dal 1880 Al 1930 (January 1998)
- I destini e le avventure dell'intellettuale ebreo, 1650–1933 (Destinies and Adventures of the Intellectual Jew, 1650–1933) (January 1996) 1st ed.
- Presenze Ebraico-Cristiane nelle Venezie (Jewish-Christian Presences in the Venezie) (with Giuseppe Dal Ferro – January 1993)
- Storia dei marrani a Venezia (A History of Marranos in Venice) (January 1991) 1st ed.
- Gesù ebreo (Jewish Jesus) (January 1990) 1st ed.
- The Ghetto of Venice (with Katherine Silberblatt Wolfthal – October 1987)
- Storia dell'Ebreo Errante (History of the Wandering Jew) (January 1987) 1st ed.
- Energia, Più Dubbi, Meno Certezze : I Perché Di Un Problema (Energy: More Doubts, Less Certainties) (January 1981)
- Una di maggio (One in May) (1975)
