= Jewish Museum of Venice =

Museum of the Jewish community in Venice

Coordinates: 45°26′42″N 12°19′37″E

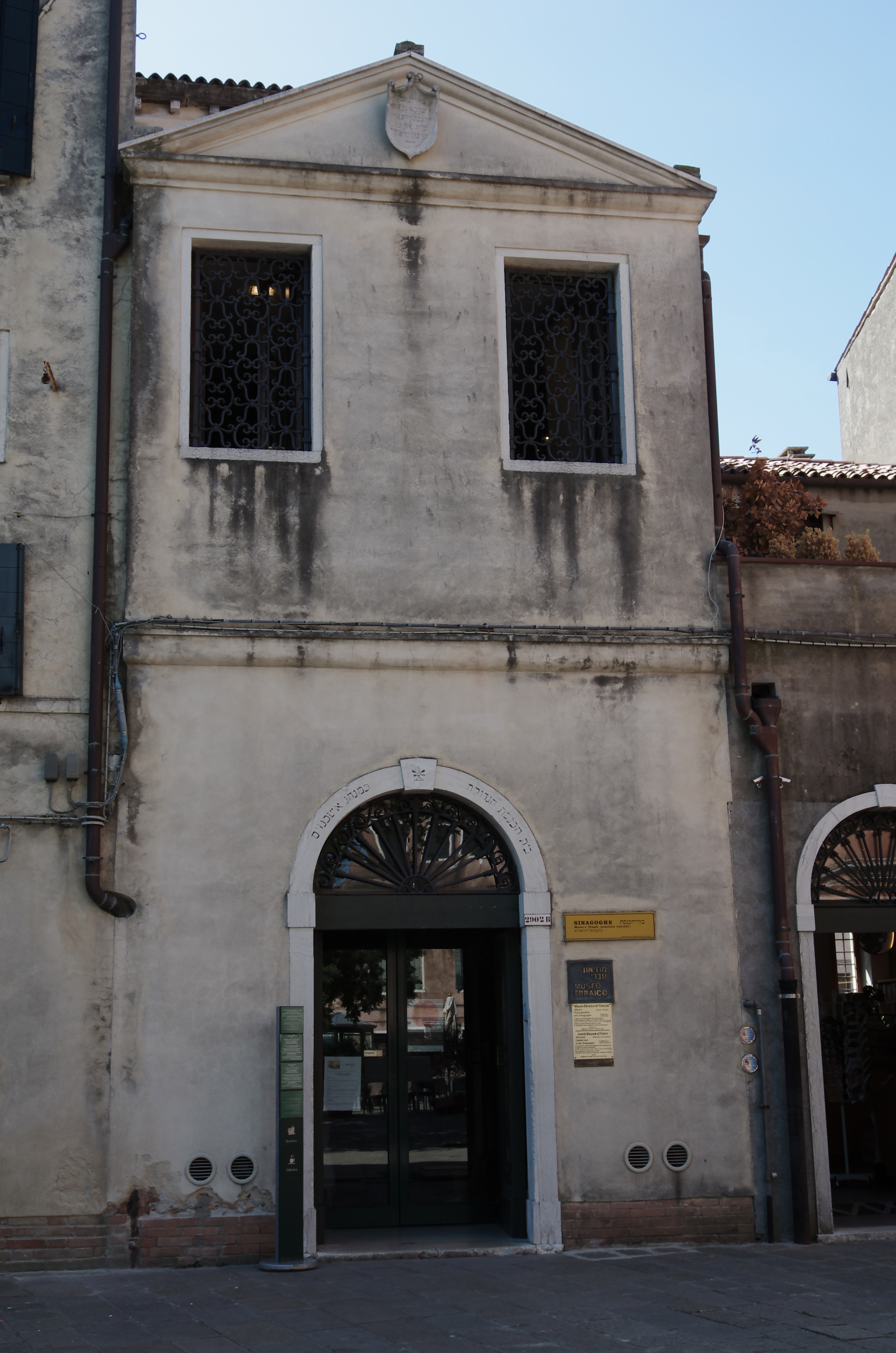
- Interactive map of the Jewish Museum of Venice area

General information
- Location: Ghetto Ebraico (Venetian Ghetto), Campo di Ghetto Nuovo, 2902, b, 30121 Venezia VE, Italy, Venice, Italy

Website
- https://www.museoebraico.it/en/museum/

The Jewish Museum of Venice (Italian: Museo Ebraico di Venezia) is a museum focusing on the history of Jews in the city of Venice.

== History ==
The Jewish Museum of Venice was founded in 1953 by Cesare Vivante and rabbis Elio Toaff and Bruno Polacco. It was established at the request of Giovannina Reinisch Sullam and Aldo Fortis. The museum was dedicated to Vittorio Fano, president of the Jewish Community of Venice from 1945 to 1959. Its original purpose remains the same as today.

The museum is located in between the Great German Synagogue and the Canton Synagogue, the two oldest Venetian synagogues. The Museum also organises tours of the synagogues in Venice in an effort to preserve them and educate visitors about the city's Jewish history.

The 2020-2023 restoration includes an expansion of the physical museum as well as restoration of the synagogues, key parts of the museum's story.

== Collection ==
The museum includes the following objects in its collection:

- Hannukiahs (Hanukkah menorahs or candelabras)
- jugs and handbasins used by priests
- prayer bookbinding
- A collection of textiles

== Bookshop ==
The museum's bookstore includes books on Jewish religion, history, and art.
