= Italian Synagogue (Venice) =

Orthodox synagogue in Venice, Italy

- Italian: Scuola Italiana
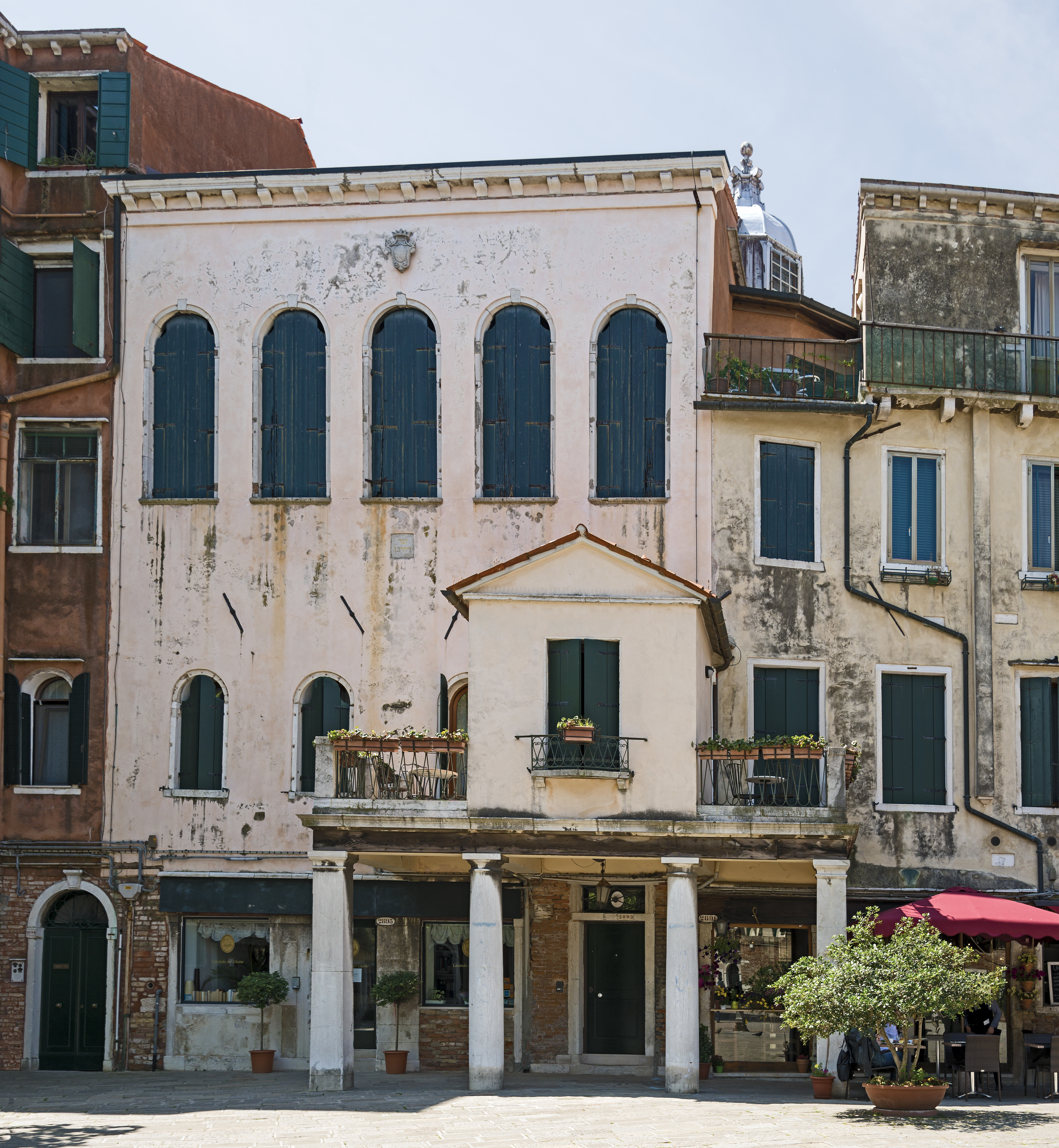
- The synagogue façade, from the square of the Ghetto Nuovo, in 2015

- Location of the synagogue in Venice

Religion
- Affiliation: Orthodox Judaism
- Rite: Italian rite
- Ecclesiastical or organizational status: Synagogue
- Status: Active

Location
- Location: Jewish Ghetto, Venice
- Country: Italy
- Interactive map of Italian Synagogue
- Coordinates: 45°26′42″N 12°19′36″E

Architecture
- Type: Synagogue architecture
- Style: Baroque
- Completed: 1575

Specifications
- Capacity: 25 seats
- Materials: Stone

Website
- jvenice.org/en/italian-synagogue/

The Italian Synagogue (Italian: Scuola Italiana) is an Orthodox Jewish congregation and synagogue, that is located in the Jewish Ghetto of Venice, Italy. Completed in 1575, it is one of five synagogues that were established in the ghetto.

== History ==
The Italian Synagogue was built in 1575 to serve the needs of the Italian Jews, the poorest group living in the Venetian Ghetto. As such, it is the smallest, and the most simple of the five synagogues. Like the other four synagogues in Venice, it was termed a scuola ("School"), rather than sinagoga ("Synagogue"), in the same way in which Ashkenazi Jews refer to the synagogue as the shul ("School"). The synagogue was restored in 1970 and extensive restorations were completed in 2023.

It was a clandestine synagogue, tolerated on the condition that it be concealed within a building that gives no appearance being a house of worship from the exterior, although the interior is elaborately decorated.

== Architecture ==
The synagogue, which is quite small, accommodates only 25 worshipers. The main features of the room are the Bimah and the Ark. Four large windows illuminate the room from the south side of the campo of the Ghetto Nuovo.

== See also ==
- History of the Jews in Venice
- List of synagogues in Italy
