= Kaliman =

Kaliman can refer to:

- Kalimán, a Mexican comic book character
- Kaliman I of Bulgaria
- Kaliman II of Bulgaria
- Kaliman, Iran, a village in Gilan Province
