= Spanish Synagogue (Venice) =

Orthodox synagogue in Venice, Italy

- Italian: Scola Ponentina; or Italian: Sinagoga Scuola Spagnola
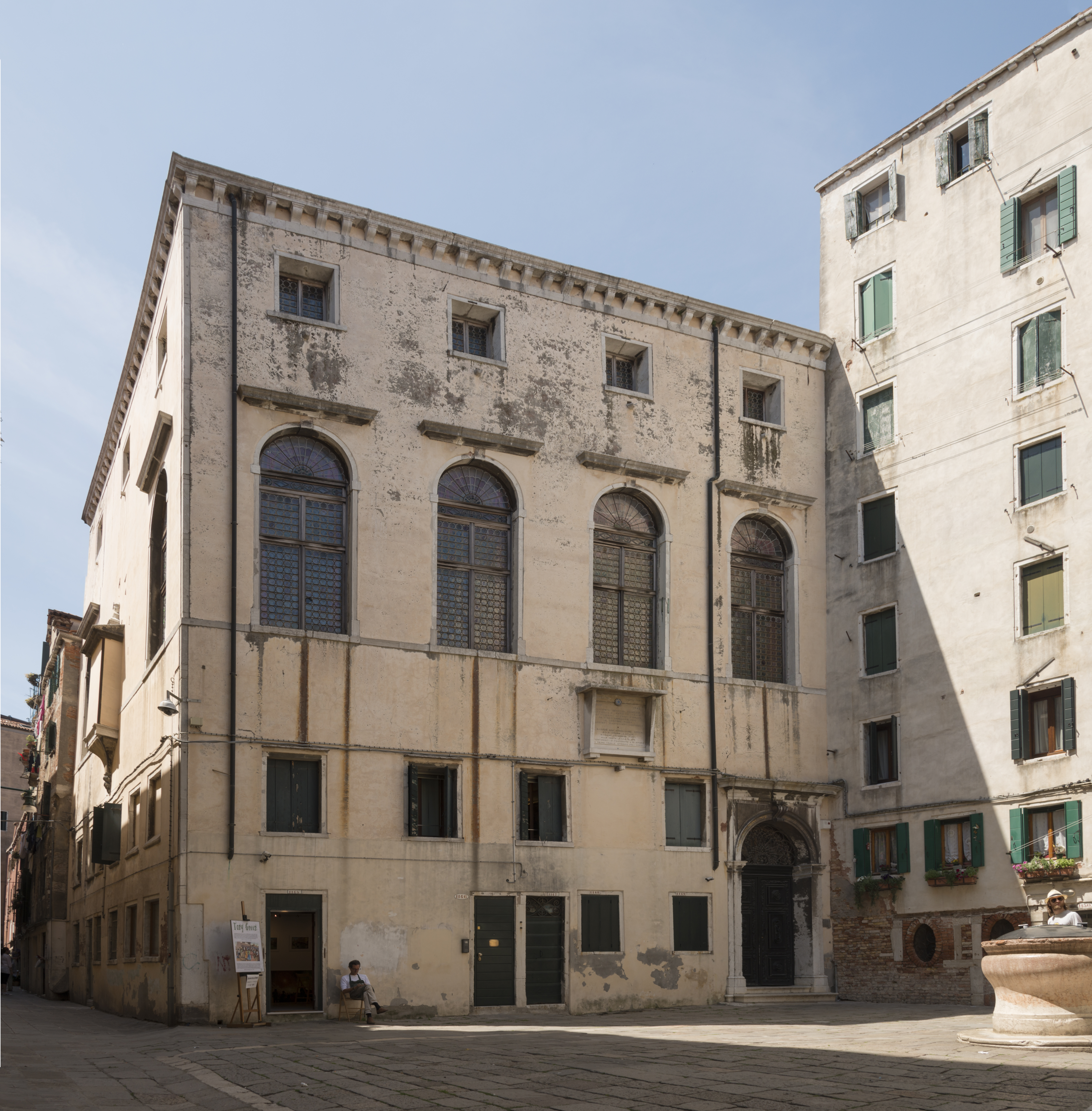
- The synagogue façade, from the square of the Ghetto Nuovo, in 2015

- Location of the synagogue in Venice

Religion
- Affiliation: Orthodox Judaism
- Rite: Italian rite; Spanish rite
- Ecclesiastical or organizational status: Synagogue
- Status: Active

Location
- Location: Jewish Ghetto, Venice
- Country: Italy
- Interactive map of Spanish Synagogue
- Coordinates: 45°26′41″N 12°19′32″E

Architecture
- Architect: Baldassare Longhena
- Type: Synagogue architecture
- Style: Baroque
- Established: 1555 (as a congregation)
- Completed: 1580
- Materials: Stone

The Spanish Synagogue (Italian: Scola Ponentina; or Italian: Sinagoga Scuola Spagnola) is an Orthodox Jewish congregation and synagogue, that is located in the Jewish Ghetto of Venice, Italy. Designed by Baldassare Longhena in the Baroque style, the synagogue was completed in 1580, and it is one of five synagogues that were established in the ghetto.

The synagogue is open for services from Passover until the end of the High Holiday season.

== History ==
The Spanish Synagogue was founded by Jews expelled from the Iberian Peninsula in the 1490s who reached Venice, usually via Amsterdam, Livorno or Ferrara, in the 1550s. The four-story yellow stone building was constructed in 1580 and was restored in 1635. It is a clandestine synagogue, which was tolerated on the condition that it be concealed within a building that gives no appearance being a house of worship form the exterior, although the interior is elaborately decorated.

The synagogue's ornate interior contains three large chandeliers and a dozen smaller ones, as well as a huge sculpted wooden ceiling.

== Gallery ==
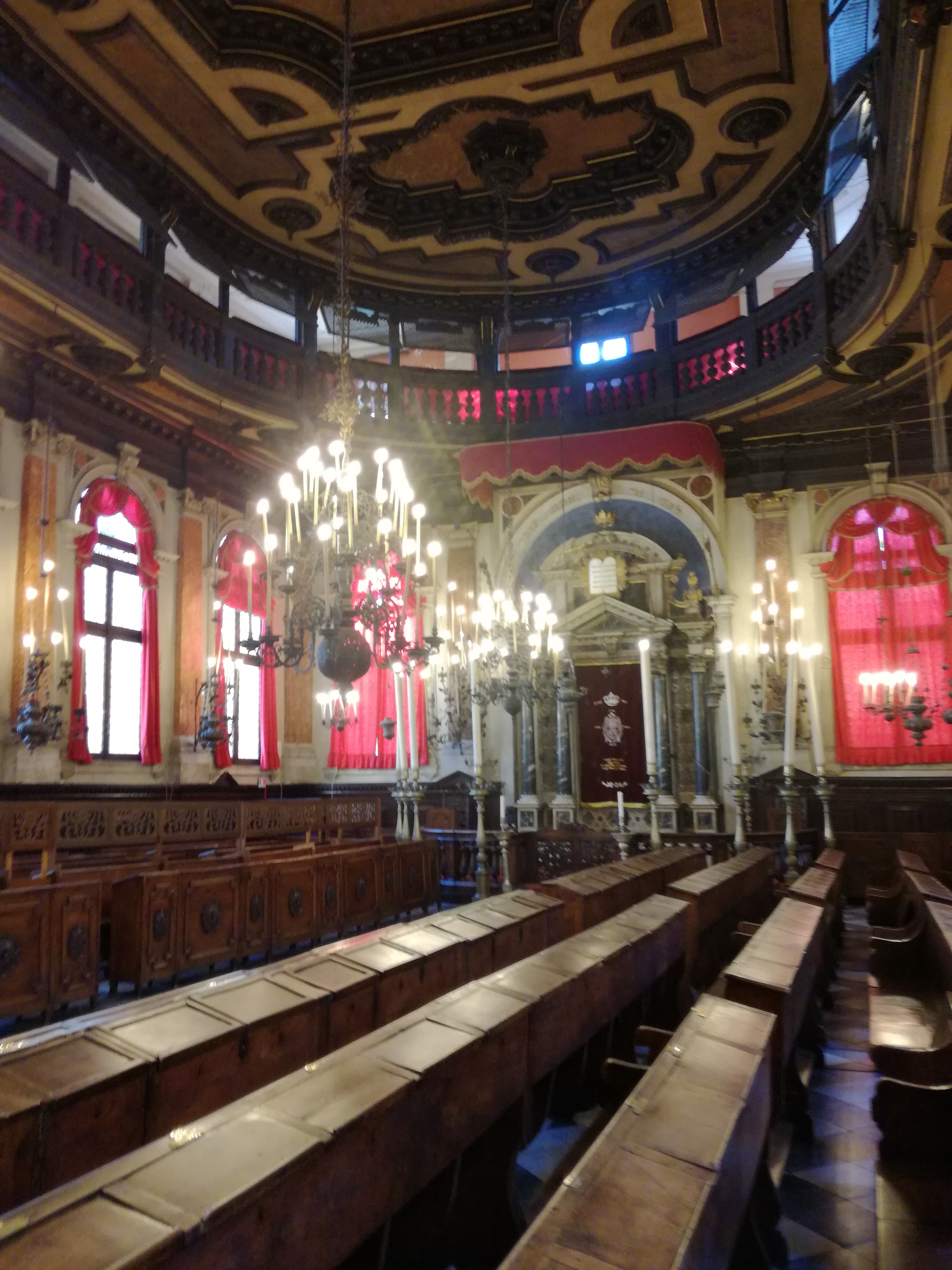
View towards the ark

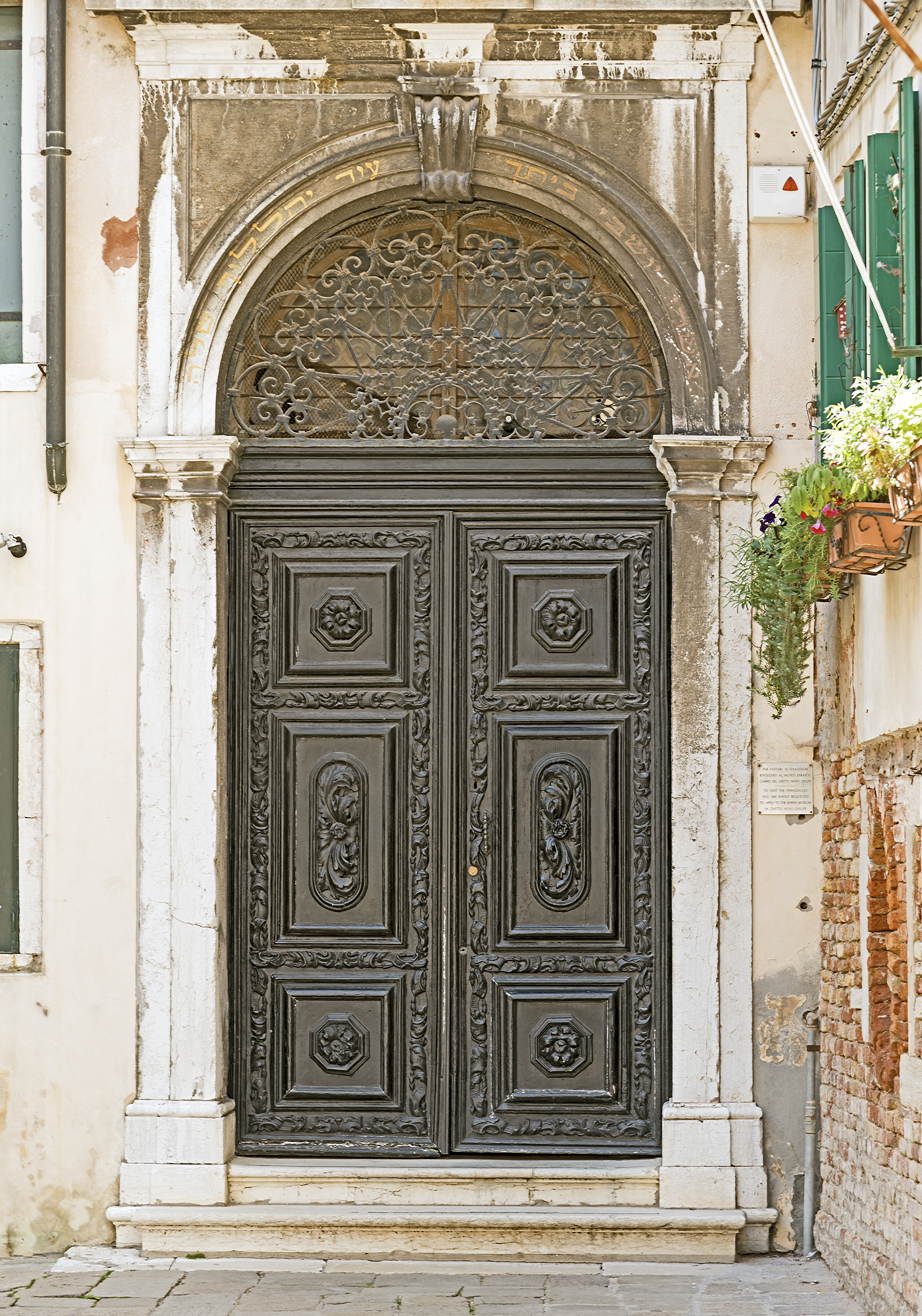
Gate on campo delle scole

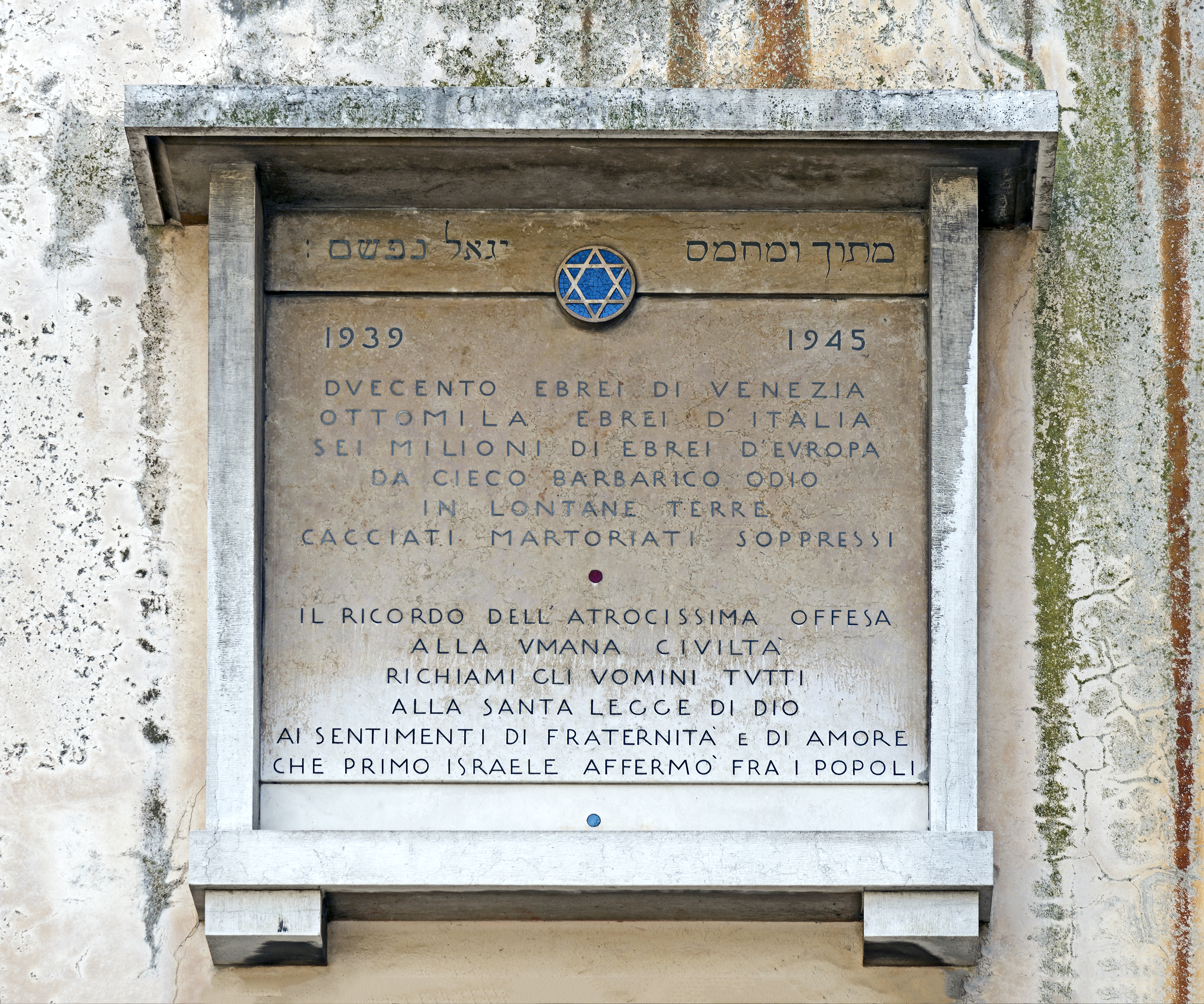
Holocaust memorial

== See also ==
- History of the Jews in Venice
- List of synagogues in Italy
