= Venetian Ghetto =

Neighbourhood in Venice

Coordinates: 45°26′43″N 12°19′35″E

The Venetian Ghetto (Venetian: Gheto de Venesia) was the area of Venice in which Jews were forced to live by the government of the Venetian Republic. The English word ghetto is derived from the Jewish ghetto in Venice. The Venetian Ghetto was instituted on 29 March 1516 by decree of Doge Leonardo Loredan and the Venetian Senate. It was not the first time that Jews in Venice were compelled to live in a segregated area of the city. In 1555, Venice had 160,208 inhabitants, including 923 Jews, who were mainly merchants.

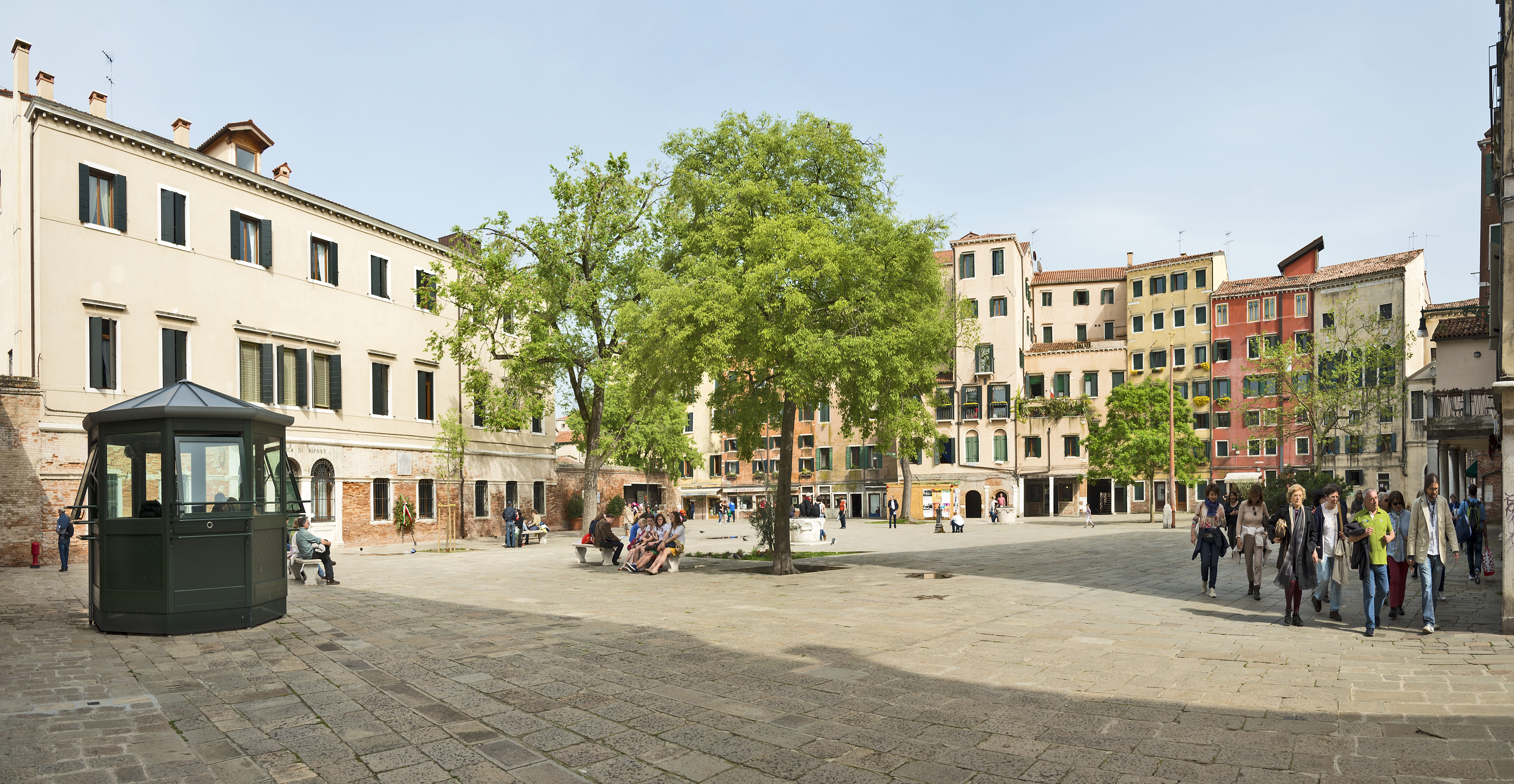
The main square of the Venetian Ghetto

Between 1541 and 1633, the Ghetto Vecchio ("Old Ghetto") and Ghetto Nuovo ("New Ghetto") were made to accommodate the increase in Jewish immigration, but the total number of Jews in Italy did not exceed 25,000. The Jewish community in Venice did not exceed 5,000 until the early seventeenth century.

In 1797, the French Army of Italy, commanded by the 28-year-old General Napoleon Bonaparte, occupied Venice, forced the Venetian Republic to dissolve itself on 12 May 1797, and ended the ghetto's separation from the city on 11 July of the same year. In the 19th century, the ghetto was renamed the Contrada dell'unione.

== Etymology ==
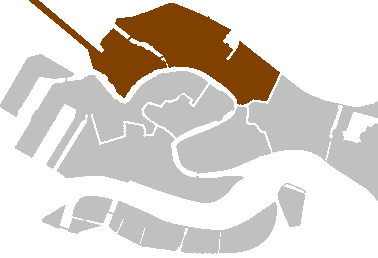
Location of Cannaregio district in Venice

The origins of the name ghetto (gheto in the Venetian language) are disputed. Among the theories are:

- ghetto comes from giotto or geto, meaning "foundry", since the first Jewish quarter was near a foundry that once made cannons; ghetto, from Italian getto, which is the act of, or the resulting object from, pouring molted metal into a mold, as old state foundries existed in this city quarter;
- ghetto formerly meant "street" (like German Gasse, Swedish gata, and Gothic gatwō);
- ghetto comes from borghetto, diminutive of borgo, meaning "town";
- ghetto is related to the Hebrew word get, meaning a divorce document.

The Oxford University Press etymologist Anatoly Liberman 2009 reviewed many theories and concluded that all were speculative.

Historian Donatella Calabi argued in the documentary Venice and the Ghetto (2017, Klaus T. Steindl) that ghetto comes from the Italian word gettare [dʒetˈtaːre] which means "throw away", because the area was before then a waste dump for foundries. The first Jewish arrivals were German and they pronounced the word [ˈɡɛto]—the spelling followed ("h" after "g" indicates [ɡ] as opposed to [dʒ]). The same opinion was published in her book Venezia e il ghetto. Cinquecento anni del "recinto deli ebrei". Marcella Ansaldi, director of the Jewish Museum of Venice, endorses this theory in a history video.

The author of Ghetto: The History of a Word, Daniel B. Schwartz, endorses the theories that the term ghetto did not emerge as a result of Jewish resident segregation, but rather, that the word is a relic of a history that preceded the arrival of the Jewish residents. Schwartz states that the strongest argument in support of this is how the original area to which Jews were restricted was called the Ghetto Nuovo, and not the Ghetto Vecchio. "Were it otherwise, one would expect that the first site of the Jewish enclosure would have been known as the 'Old Ghetto' and the subsequent addition as the 'New Ghetto.'"

== Senate decree of 1516 ==
On March 29, 1516, the Venetian Senate decreed that all Jews residing in Venice must move within the territory of the Ghetto Nuovo. After the defeat of the Republic of Venice at the hands of the League of Cambrai in 1509, Jews had settled permanently throughout Venice, in the parishes of San Cassiano, Sant'Agostin, San Polo, and Santa Maria Mater Domini. Jews had previously only been allowed to visit Venice for a maximum of 15 days annually. The 1516 senate decree stipulated:

that all the Jews who are at present living in different parishes within our city, and all others who may come here … shall be obliged to go at once to dwell together in the houses in the court within the Geto at San Hieronimo, where there is plenty of room for them to live… . The Jews may not keep an inn in any part of the city, save the Geto

According to the Venetian Senate, this was necessary to avoid what it described as "misdemeanours and detestable and abominable acts":

Given the urgent needs of the present times, the said Jews have been permitted to come and live in Venice, and the main purpose of this concession was to preserve the property of Christians which was in their hands. But no godfearing subject of our state would have wished them, after their arrival, to disperse throughout the city, sharing houses with Christians and going wherever they choose by day and night, perpetrating all those misdemeanours and detestable and abominable acts which are generally known and shameful to describe, with grave offence to the Majesty of God and uncommon notoriety on the part of this well-ordered Republic.

The decree ordered that the Jews would be locked into the ghetto overnight and be subject to Christian surveillance. The decree also stipulated that "the Jews must pay a rent which will be higher by one third than that received at present by the landlords of the aforesaid houses." Jews were legally forbidden from owning real estate, but could obtain—through a socially and ecclesiastically sanctioned legal arrangement called the jus gazaka—a contract similar to a permanent lease that could be bought and sold as well as inherited; Jews had to pay the high rent of their apartments in the ghetto in perpetuity.

== Location and geography ==
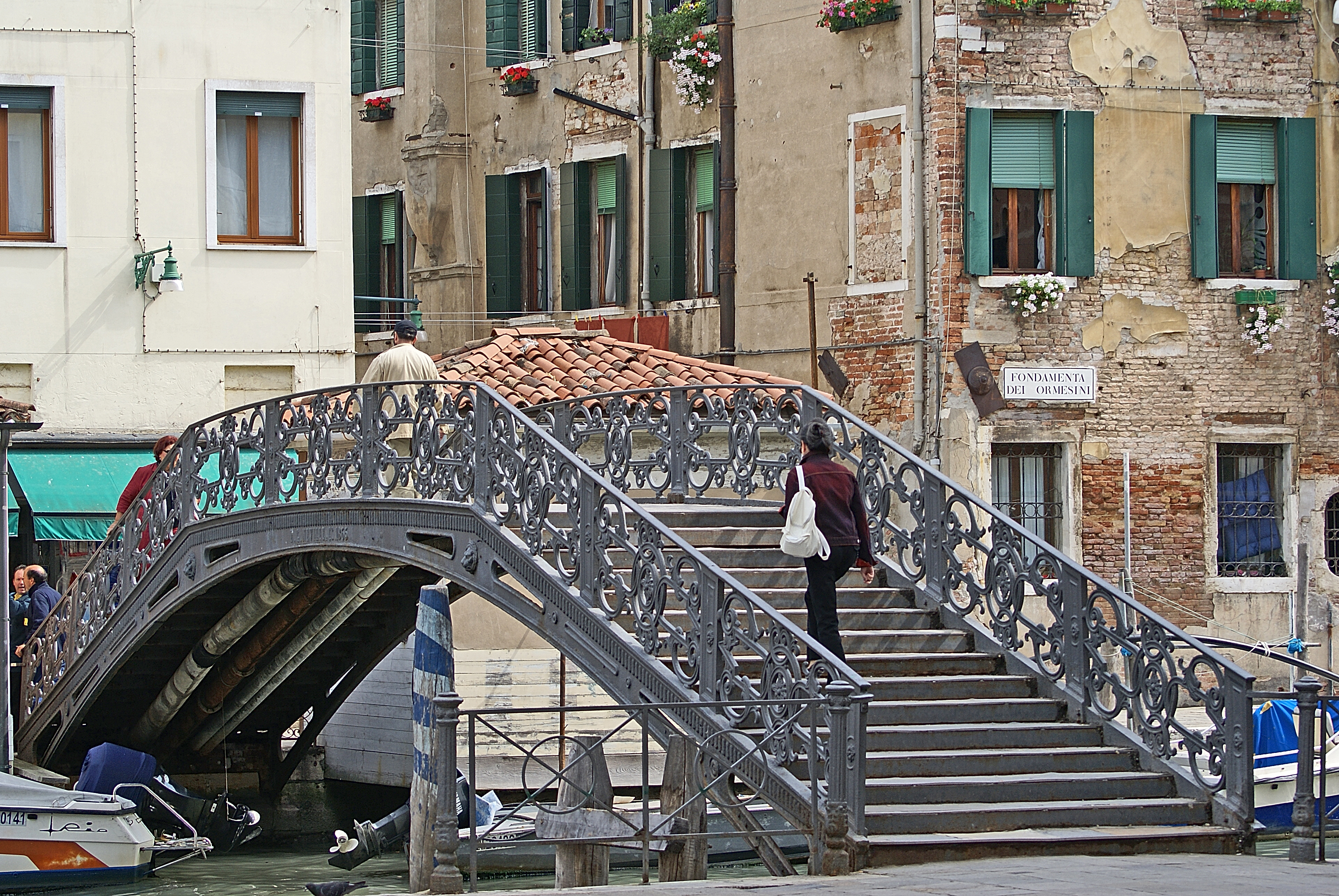
Ponte de Gheto Novo

The Ghetto is an area of the Cannaregio sestiere of Venice, divided into the Ghetto Nuovo ("New Ghetto"), and the adjacent Ghetto Vecchio ("Old Ghetto"). These names refer to older and newer foundries sites in these locations which fell out of use before the ghetto was created: in terms of Jewish residence, the Ghetto Nuovo is actually older than the Ghetto Vecchio. The ghetto was connected to the rest of the city by two bridges that were only open during the day. Gates were opened in the morning at the ringing of the marangona, the largest bell in St. Mark's Campanile (belfry), and locked in the evening. Permanent, round-the-clock surveillance of the gates occurred at the Jewish residents' expense. Strict penalties were to be imposed on any Jewish resident caught outside after curfew. Areas of Ghetto Nuovo that were open to the canal were to be sealed off with walls, while outward facing quays were to be bricked over in order to make it impossible for unauthorized entry or exit. The area that was considered to be Ghetto Vecchio later on, was once an area where Christians lived and once the Christians relocated, the area became available for non-Venetian Jewish merchants to stay while working in the city temporarily.

== Culture ==
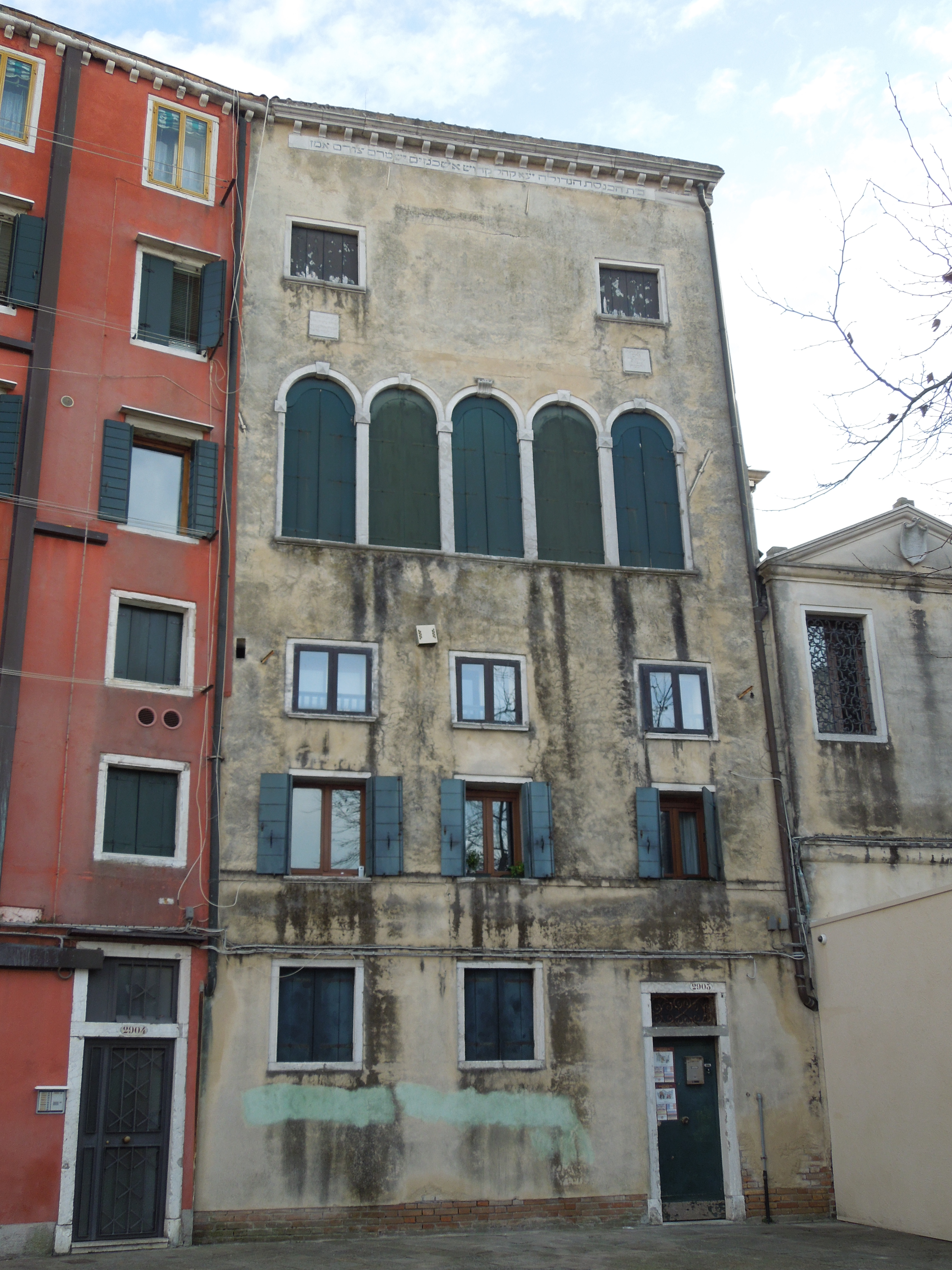
Scuola Grande Tedesca (Great German Synagogue)

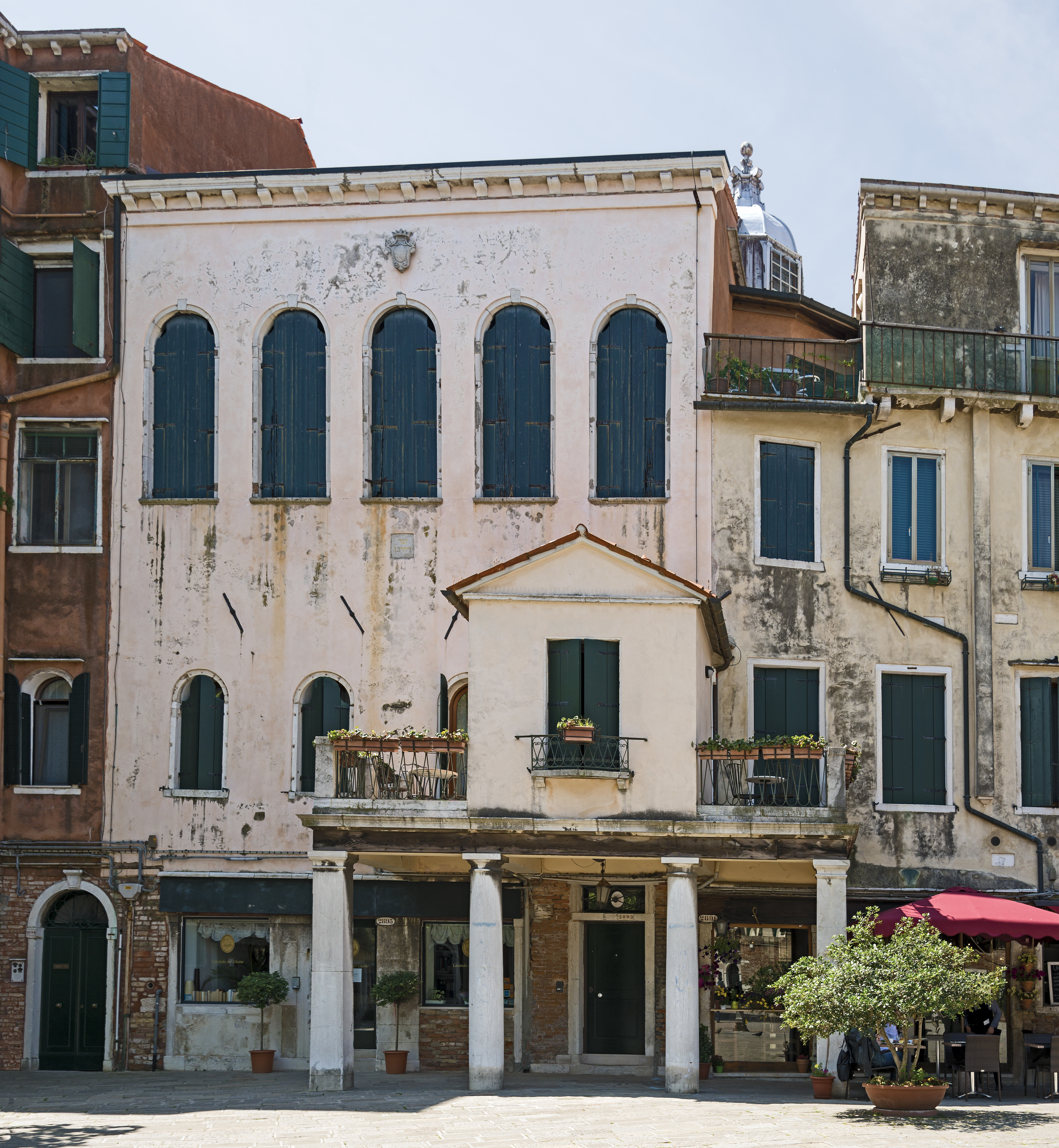
Scuola Italiana (Italian Synagogue)

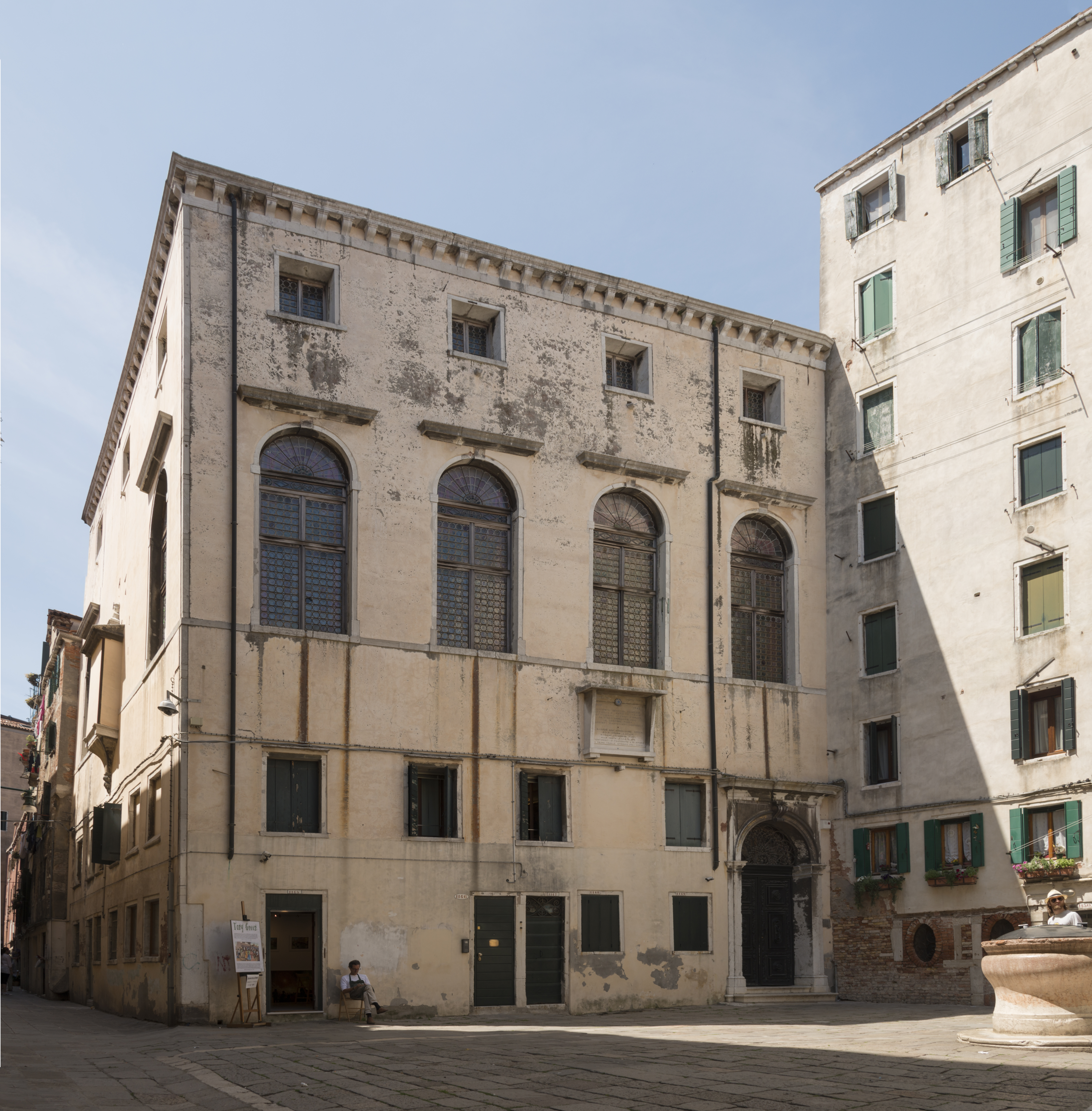
Scuola Spagnola (Spanish Synagogue)

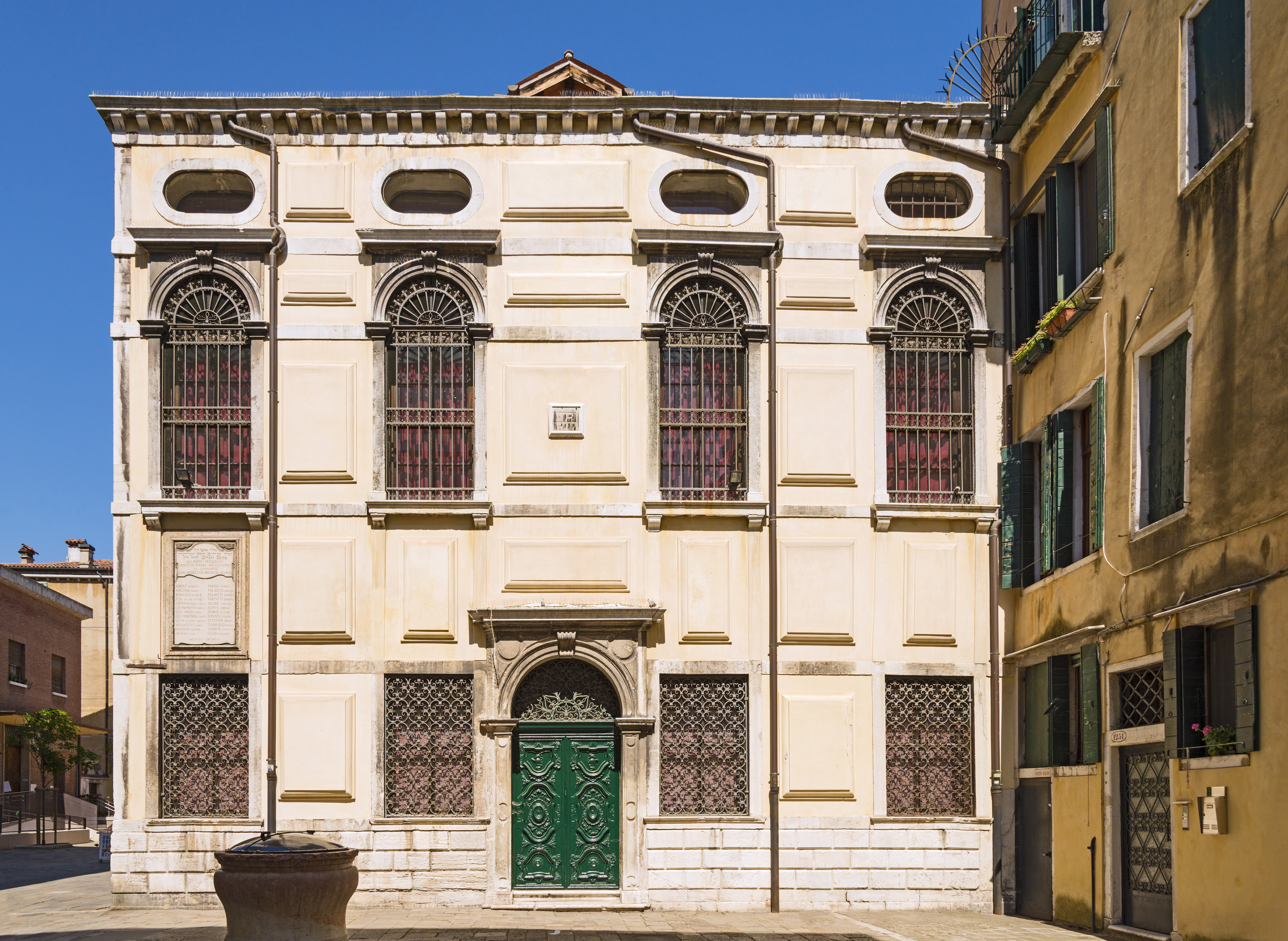
Scuola Levantina (Levantine Synagogue)

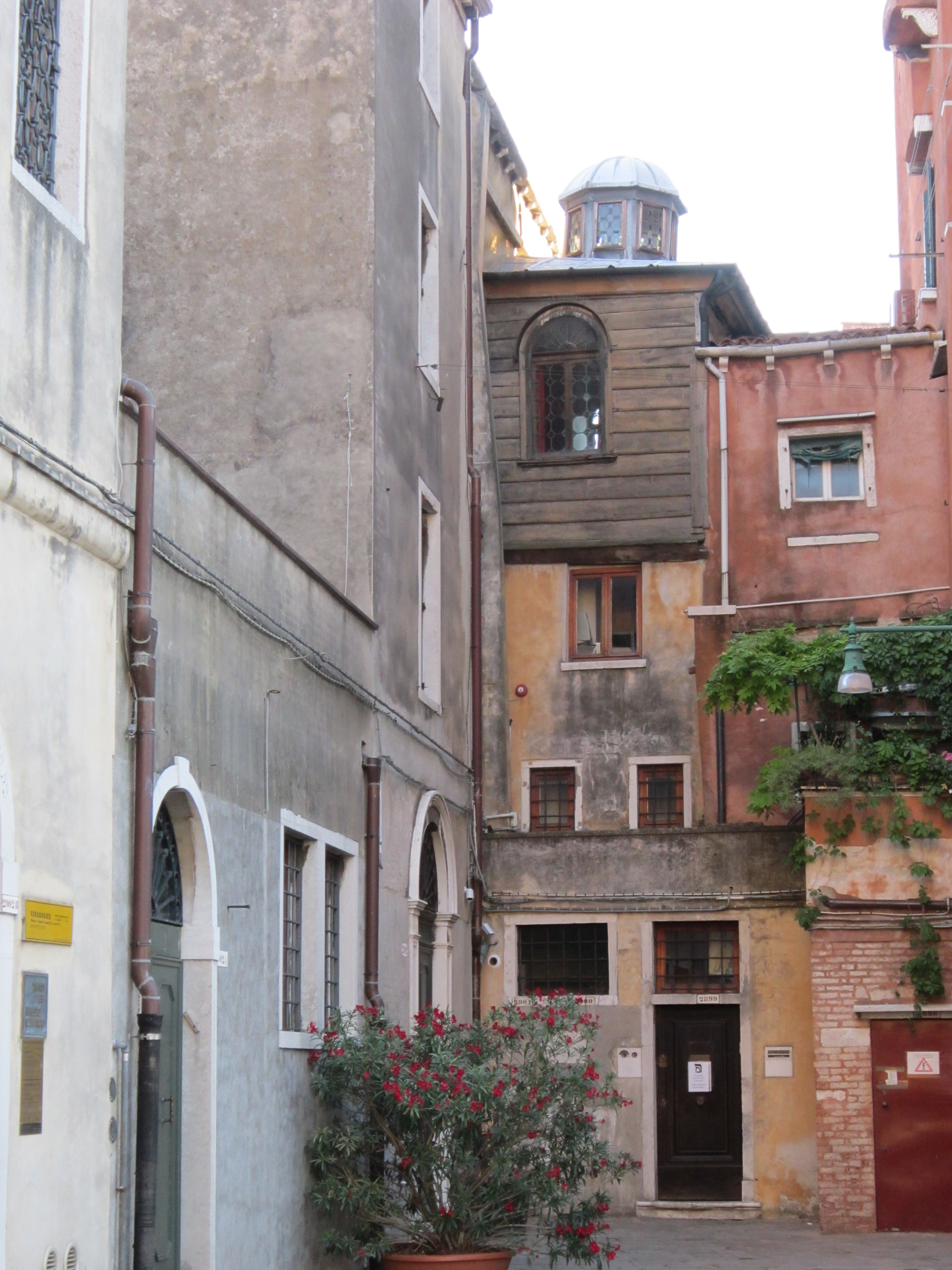
Scuola Canton (Canton Synagogue)

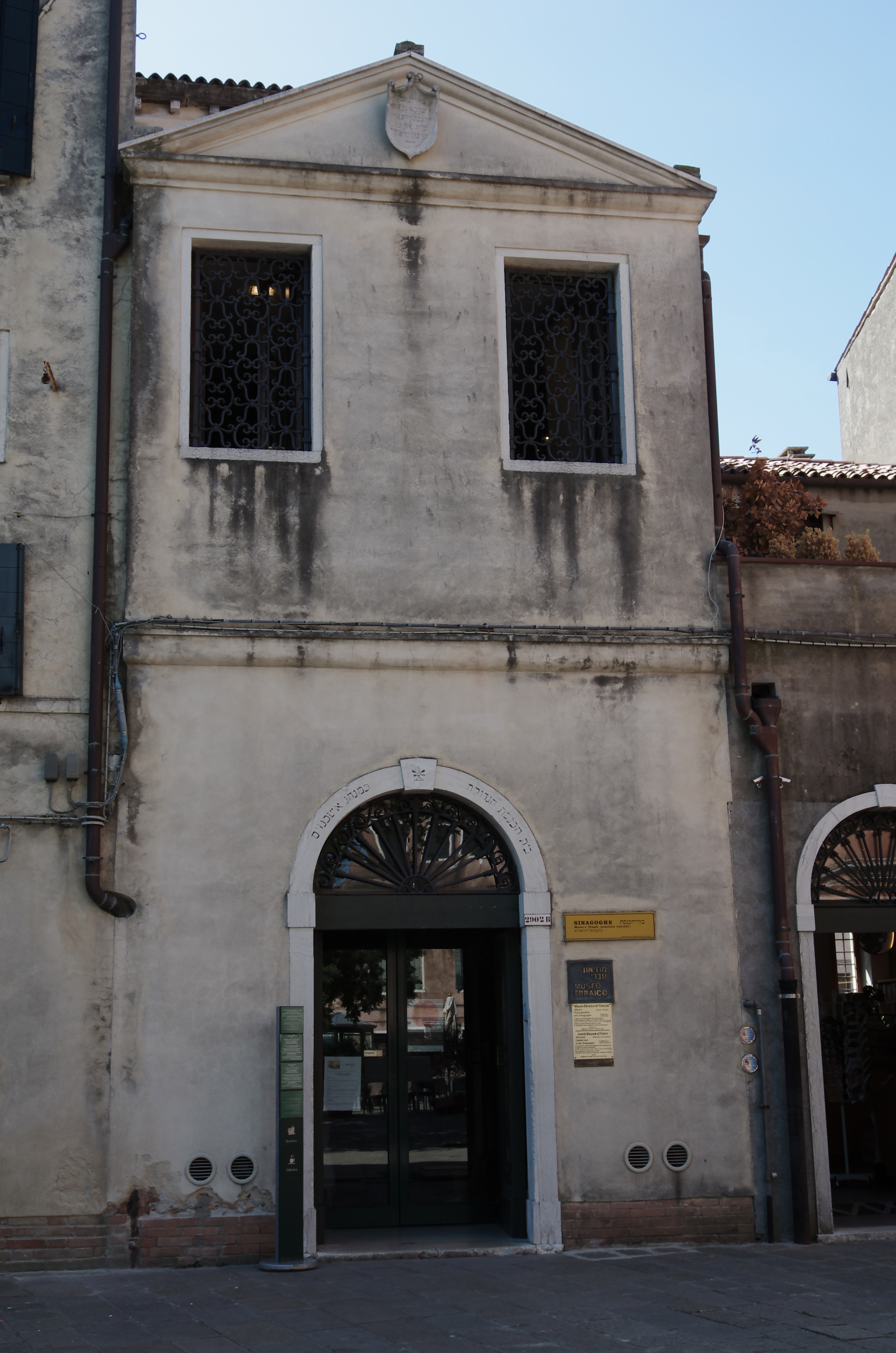
Jewish Museum of Venice

Though it was home to a large number of Jews, the population living in the Venetian Ghetto never assimilated to form a distinct, "Venetian Jewish" ethnicity. Four of the five synagogues were clearly divided according to ethnic identity: separate synagogues existed for the German (the Scuola Grande Tedesca), Italian (the Scuola Italiana), Spanish and Portuguese (the Scuola Spagnola), and Levantine Sephardi communities (the Scuola Levantina). The fifth, the Scuola Canton, was possibly built as a private synagogue and also served the Venetian Ashkenazi community. Today, there are also other populations of Ashkenazic Jews in Venice, mainly Lubavitchers who operate a kosher food store, a yeshiva, and a Chabad synagogue.

Languages historically spoken in the confines of the Ghetto include Venetian, Judeo-Italian, Judeo-Spanish, French, and Yiddish. In addition, Hebrew is used on signage, inscriptions, and for official purposes such as wedding contracts and religious services. Today, English is widely used in the shops and the Museum because of the large number of English-speaking tourists.

A large part of Venetian Jewish culture at this time was shaped by navigating restrictions on their freedoms. Life in the Venetian Ghetto was restrictive, and movement of Jews outside of the ghetto was difficult. Inspired by lives of Jewish merchants outside of Venice, Rodriga, a prominent Jewish Spanish merchant, took on the role of advocating for Venetian Jews to have rights similar to others in different locations. Rodriga cited that Jews played a part in the Italian economy which could not be ignored. In return for the changing of Jewish restrictions, Rodriga promised that the Venetian economy and commerce would increase.

== Ghetto today ==
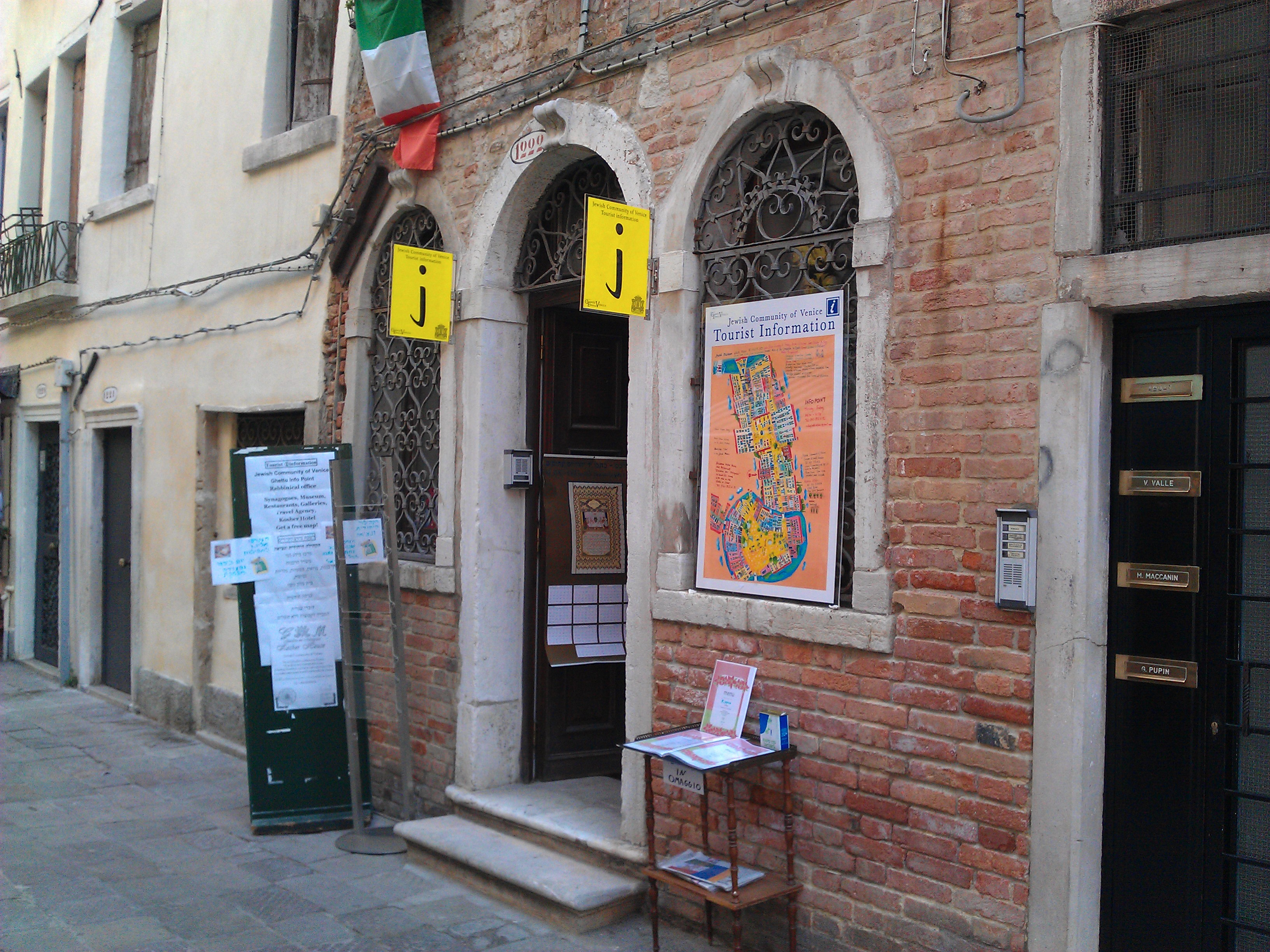
The Info Point of the Jewish Community of Venice in the Old Ghetto

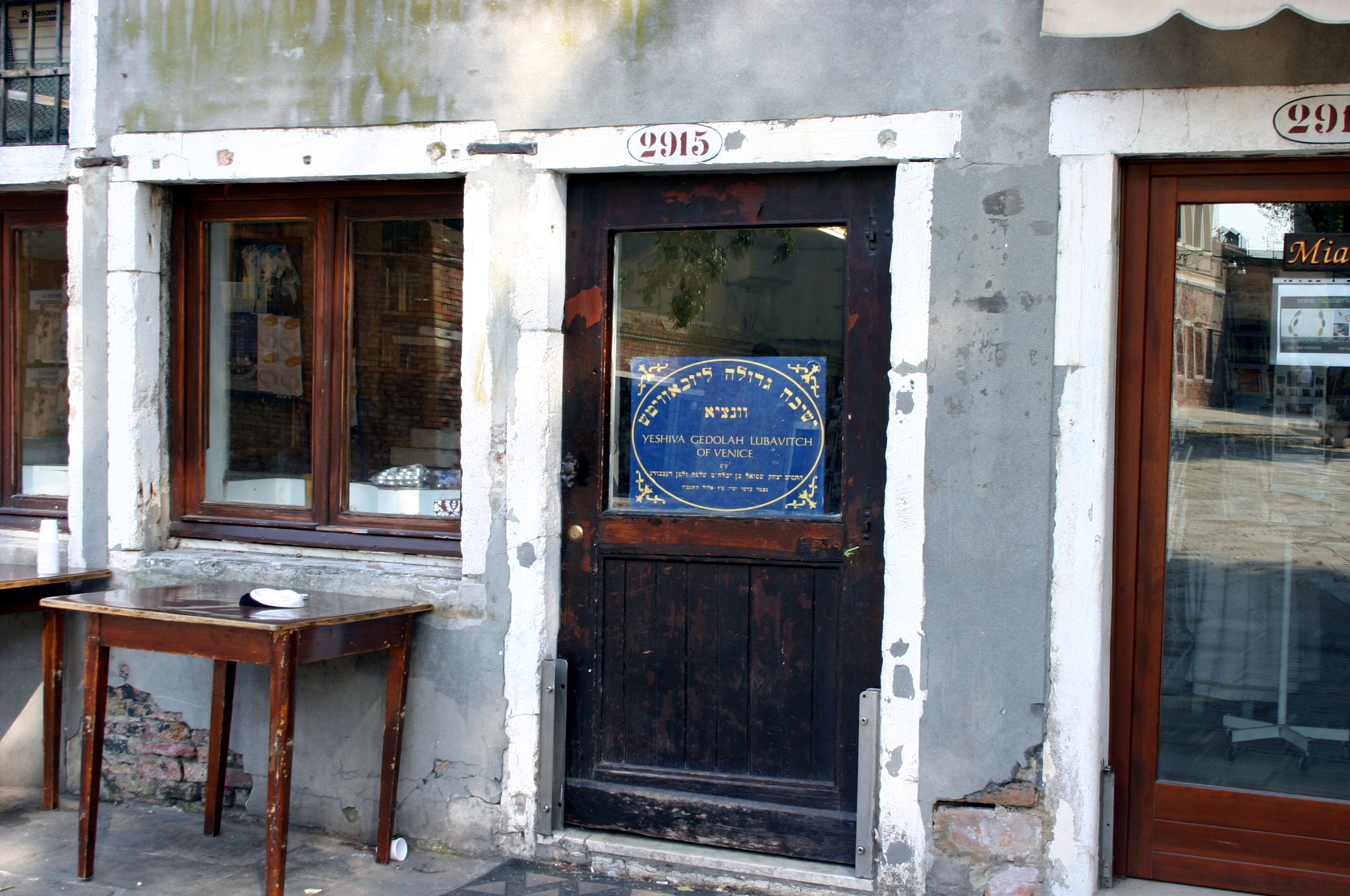
A Lubavitch Yeshiva in the former Ghetto of Venice

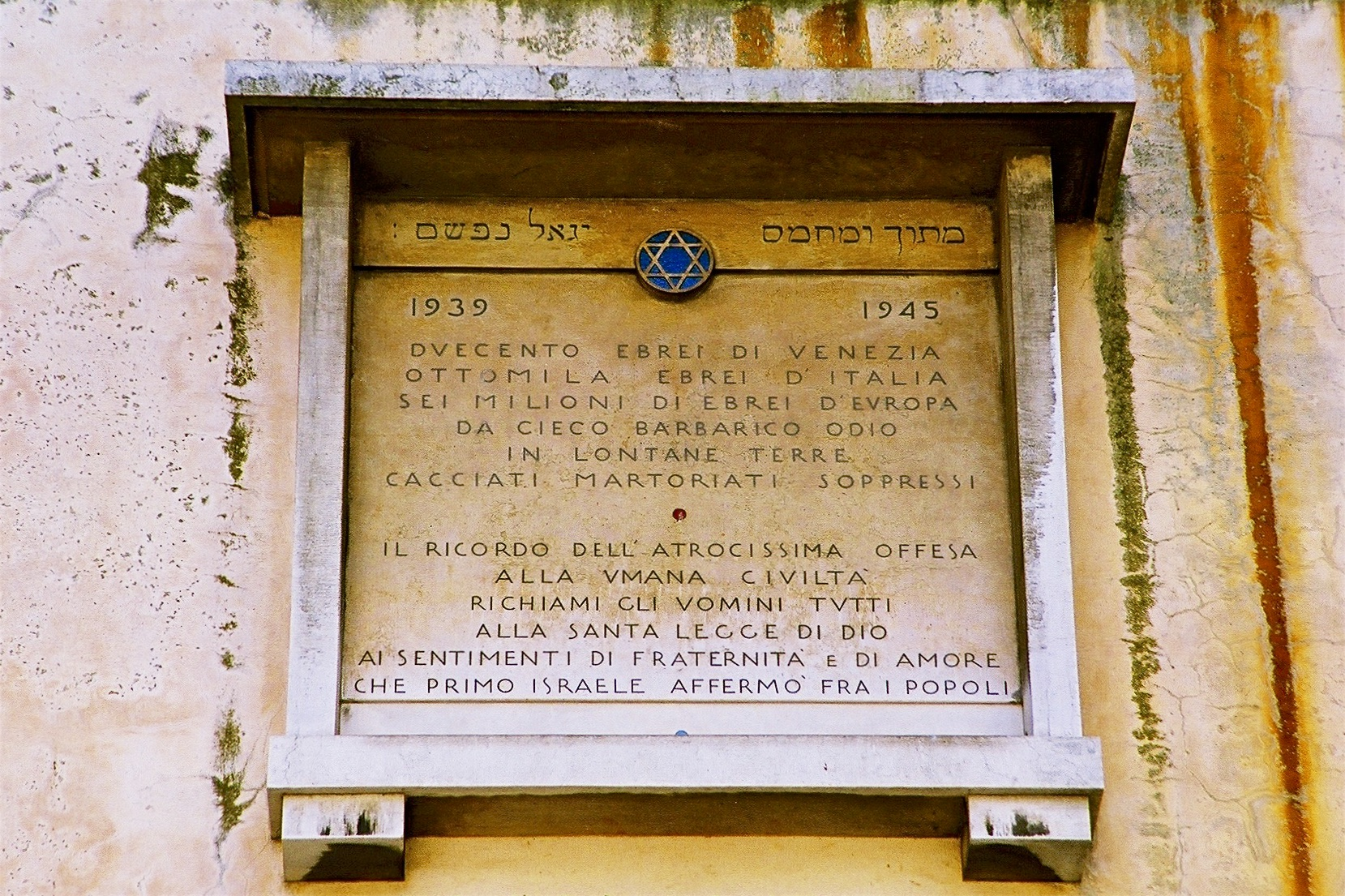
A memorial plaque to Venice's Holocaust victims in Campo del Ghetto Nuovo, Venice

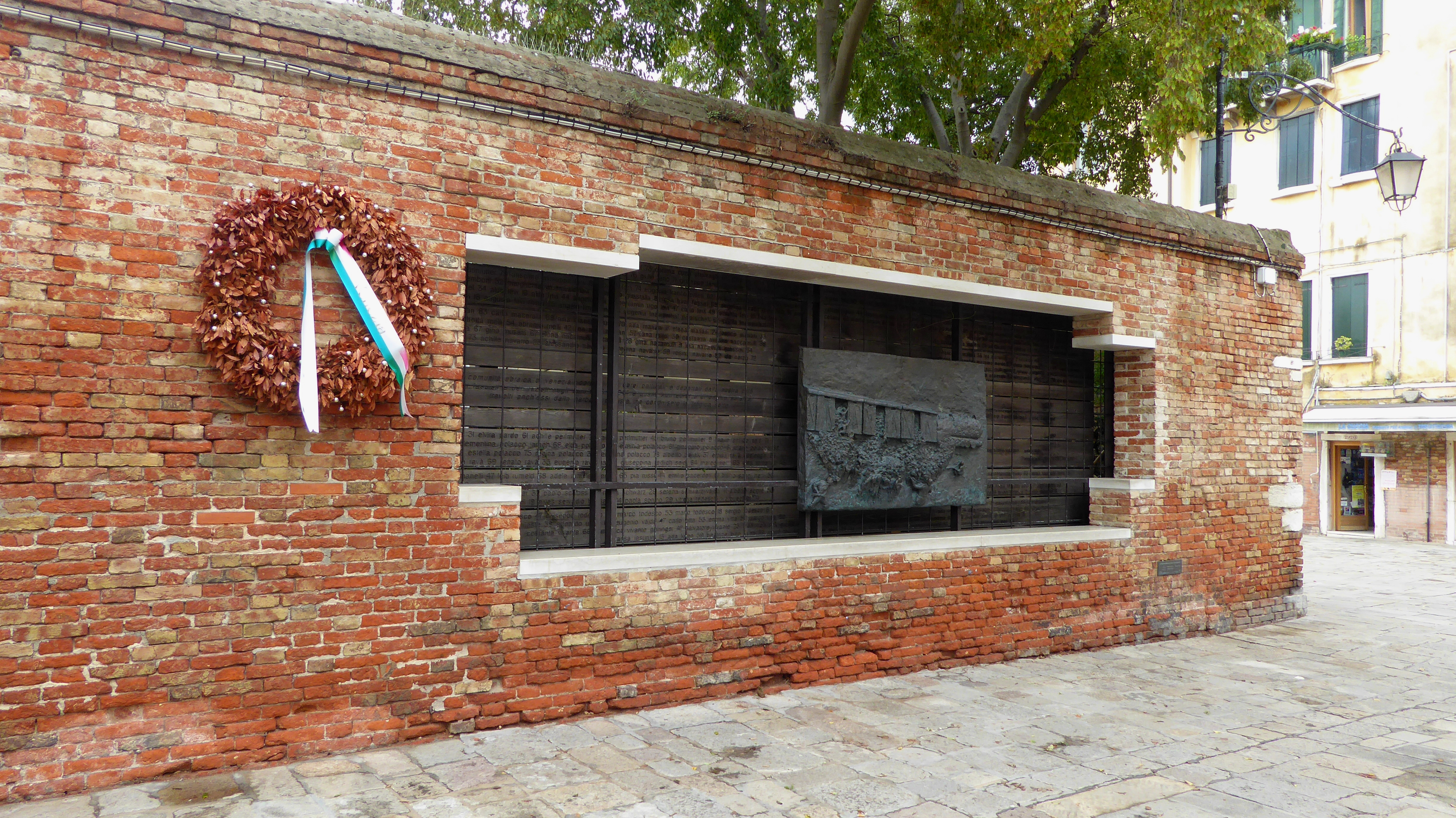
The memorial to victims of the Holocaust in the Venetian Ghetto

Today, the Ghetto is still a center of Jewish life in the city. The Jewish community of Venice, which numbers around 450 people, is culturally active. However, only a few Jews actually live in the Ghetto because the area has become expensive.

Every year, there is an international conference on Hebrew Studies, with particular reference to the history and culture of the Veneto. Other conferences, exhibitions and seminars are held throughout the year.

The temples not only serve as places of worship but also provide lessons on the sacred texts and the Talmud for both children and adults, along with courses in Modern Hebrew, while other social facilities include a kindergarten, an old people's home, the kosher guest house Rimon Place, the kosher restaurant Ba Ghetto Venezia, and the bakery Volpe. Along with its architectural and artistic monuments, the community also boasts a Museum of Jewish Art, the Renato Maestro Library and Archive and the new Info Point inside the Midrash Leon da Modena.

In the Ghetto area there is also a yeshiva, several Judaica shops, and a Chabad synagogue run by Chabad of Venice. Although few Venetian Jews still live in the Ghetto, many return there during the day for religious services at the two synagogues still actively used for worship (the other three are only used for guided tours, offered by the Jewish Community Museum).

Chabad of Venice also runs a pastry shop and a restaurant named "Gam Gam" in the Ghetto. Sabbath meals are served at the restaurant's outdoor tables along the Cannaregio Canal with views of the Guglie Bridge near the Grand Canal. In the novel Much Ado About Jesse Kaplan, the restaurant is the site of a historical mystery. Canal boats carrying a sukkah and a menorah tour the city annually during the festivals of Sukkot and Hanukkah, respectively.

== Notable residents ==
Notable residents of the Ghetto have included Leon of Modena, whose family originated in France, as well as his disciple Sara Copia Sullam. She was an accomplished writer, debater (through letters), and even hosted her own salon. Meir Magino, the famous glassmaker also came from the ghetto.

=== In fiction ===
- Amitav Ghosh's 2019 novel Gun Island links the Sundarbans to Venice and the Ghetto.
- Geraldine Brooks' 2008 novel People of the Book, which traces the history of the Sarajevo Haggadah, includes a chapter with action taking place in 1609 in the Venetian Ghetto.
- Sarah Dunant's novel In the Company of the Courtesan, written in 2006, features some scenes which take place at a Jewish pawnshop in the Ghetto.
- Susanna Clarke's 2004 novel Jonathan Strange & Mr Norrell features a scene in the Ghetto.
- Hugo Pratt's Fable of Venice. Corto Maltese, Book 8. Graphic Novel. IDW Publishing. ISBN 978-1631409264
- Roberta Rich: The Midwife of Venice. Ebury Publishing, UK 2011. ISBN 9780091944902.
- Rainer Maria Rilke: Eine Szene aus dem Ghetto. in: Rilke: Geschichten von lieben Gott. Insel, Leipzig 1931, Argon, Berlin 2006. (div. weitere Ausg.) ISBN 3-86610-045-0
- William Shakespeare's Shylock in The Merchant of Venice, including in adaptations and related work such as Arnold Wesker's play The Merchant (1978) and Mirjam Pressler's novel Shylocks Tochter.
- The Rabbi and the Painter, by Shoshana Weiss, (published by Kalaniot Books, 2021). The book is historical fiction for kids about Renaissance Rabbi, Leon of Modena and a young artist who lived near Jewish ghetto (Tintoretto) that find spiritual meaning through conversations together.
- The trilogy by Israel Zangwill:
  - Kinder des Ghetto. 1897. Cronbach, Berlin 1897, 1913 (German)
  - Träumer des Ghetto. 1898. Cronbach, Berlin 1908, 1922 (German)
  - Komödien des Ghetto. 1907. Cronbach, Berlin 1910 (German)
- Daniel Silva: A Death in Vienna. 2004. Novel (features scenes in Cannaregio). ISBN 0399151435
- Noah Gordon: The Jerusalem Diamond (1979) includes several chapters based in the ghetto of the 1500s.

== See also ==
- Moses Soave
- History of the Jews in Venice
- Fondaco dei Turchi
- Fondaco dei Tedeschi
